= Pinzón brothers =

15th-century Spanish sailors

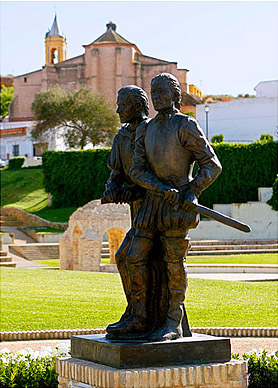
- Statue of the Pinzón brothers in Palos de la Frontera
- Names: Martín Alonso Pinzón; Francisco Martín Pinzón; Vicente Yáñez Pinzón
- Origin: Palos de la Frontera, Huelva, Spain
- Occupation: Sailors, explorers, fishermen
- Era: 15th–16th century

The Pinzón brothers – Martín Alonso, Francisco Martín and Vicente Yáñez Pinzón – were Spanish sailors, pirates, explorers, and fishermen who participated in Christopher Columbus's first expedition to the New World and other voyages of discovery and exploration in the late 15th and early 16th centuries. Natives of Palos de la Frontera, Huelva, Spain, (Note: A document in the Archivo de Simancas in the Registro general del Sello, dated March 1505, gives the terms of the inheritance of the estate of the Pinzón brothers' mother. This document is the source for the parents of the brothers being Martín Alonso Pinzón (father) and Mayor Vicente (mother), who left them some houses in the Barrero neighborhood of Palos, indicating that the family had been in Palos for at least one generation before the brothers. Cited in: Gould 1984, p. 496-497; Manzano Manzano & Manzano Fernández-Heredia 1988, Vol. I. p. 5-6.) (Note: Dentro del proceso de apelación de la sentencia de Dueñas -pleito iniciado por Diego Colón y que continuó Luis Colón- en probanza realizada en 1532 por Juan Martín Pinzón, hijo de Martín Alonso Pinzón, la primera pregunta del interrogatorio dice lo siguiente: Within the appeal trial against of the Dueñas lawsuit filed by Columbus's son Diego Colón continued by Diego's son Luis Colón in testimony made in 1532 by John Martin Pinzon, son of Martin Alonso Pinzon, the first question reads: First, if they knew Martin Alonso Pinçon, now deceased, resident of and born in the town of Palos, and Maria Alvares, his legitimage wife, who dies in the street of Nuestra Señora de la Rabida, and if they knew said Martin Alonso Pinçon and said Maria Alvares, his wife, were husband and wife under the order of the Church of the Santa Madre, and in the course of their marriage procreated and produced their legitimate and natural son Juan Martin Pinçon who now lives in the town of Huelva, and in having had him they were taken and commonly reputed, and that is the said Juan Martin. Lo primero, si conosçieron a Martin Alonso Pinçon, ya difunto, vezino e natural que fue desta villa de Palos, e a Maria Alvares, su legitima muger, los quales moravan en la calle de Nuestra Señora de la Rabida, e si saben que el dicho Martin Alonso Pinçon e la dicha Maria Alvares, su muger, fueron casados y velados segund horden de la Santa Madre Yglesia, e constante su matrymonio ovieron e procrearon por su hijo legitimo e natural a Juan Martin Pinçon que agora vive en la villa de Huelva, e en tal posesion fueron habidos e tenidos e comunmente reputados, e lo es el tal dicho Juan Martin. To all of this. the response was affirmative. The testimony is reproduced in: Muro Orejón, Antonio; Pérez-Ebid, Florentino; Morales Padrón, Francisco (1964). Pleitos colombinos: rollo del proceso sobre la apelación de la sentencia de Dueñas, 1534-1536. Sevilla: Escuela de Estudios Hispanoamericanos de Sevilla. Cited in: Fernández Duro, Cesáreo (1883). Colón y Pinzón: informe relativo a los pormenores de descubrimiento del Nuevo Mundo presentado a la Real Academia de la Historia. Madrid: Imprenta y Fundación de Manuel Tello. p. 230.; Ortega 1980, Tomo III, p. 152-153; Manzano Manzano & Manzano Fernández-Heredia 1988, Vol. I, p. 6) the brothers worked as sailors from an early age and became well-known for their many commercial voyages and piracy along the coast of Huelva. The strategic position offered by the historic Atlantic port of Palos made it a natural embarkation point from which expeditions set forth to the African coast as well as to the war against Portugal, which on many occasions were organized by the Pinzón family.

The eldest of the three brothers, Martín Alonso, and the youngest, Vicente Yáñez, served as captains of the caravels La Pinta and La Niña, respectively, on Columbus's first voyage from 1492 to 1493. The third brother, the lesser-known Francisco Martín, was aboard the Pinta as its master.

It was thanks to Martín Alonso that the seamen of the Tinto-Odiel were motivated to participate in Columbus's undertaking. He also supported the project economically, supplying money from his personal fortune. Francisco, master of the Pinta, appears to have participated in Columbus's third and fourth voyages of discovery as well as the first, but because his name was a common one, the facts of his life cannot be easily sorted out from those of contemporaries with the same name. Vicente Yáñez, besides participating in Columbus's first voyage, made several voyages to the Americas on his own account after Columbus's monopoly on transatlantic trade ended and is generally credited with the discovery of Brazil.

Although they sometimes quarreled with Columbus, on several occasions the Pinzón brothers were instrumental in preventing mutiny against him, particularly during the first voyage. On 6 October, Martín intervened in a dispute between Columbus and the crew by proposing an altered course (which Columbus eventually accepted) and thus calmed simmering unrest. A few days later, on the night of 9 October 1492, the brothers were forced to intercede once again, and this time they proposed the compromise that if no land was sighted during the next three days, the expedition would return to Spain. On the morning of the 12th, land (there has long been debate about the exact location; see Guanahani) was in fact sighted by Juan Rodriguez Bermejo (also known as Rodrigo de Triana).

== The port of Palos at the end of the 15th century ==
The Pinzón brothers lived in the era of the greatest splendor of the port town of Palos de la Frontera, participating in the majority of the activities undertaken by that port.

The historic port of Palos was a river port, protected from winds and from pirate attacks, both major hazards to the ports of the time. It was located on the lower portion of the Río Tinto known then as the Canal de Palos, about 4 kilometres (2.5 mi) from its mouth at the Atlantic and its confluence with the Odiel. The port probably grew simultaneously with the town, first as an anchorage for small vessels engaged almost exclusively in fishing on the beaches and estuaries and occasional commercial transactions to supply the small population.

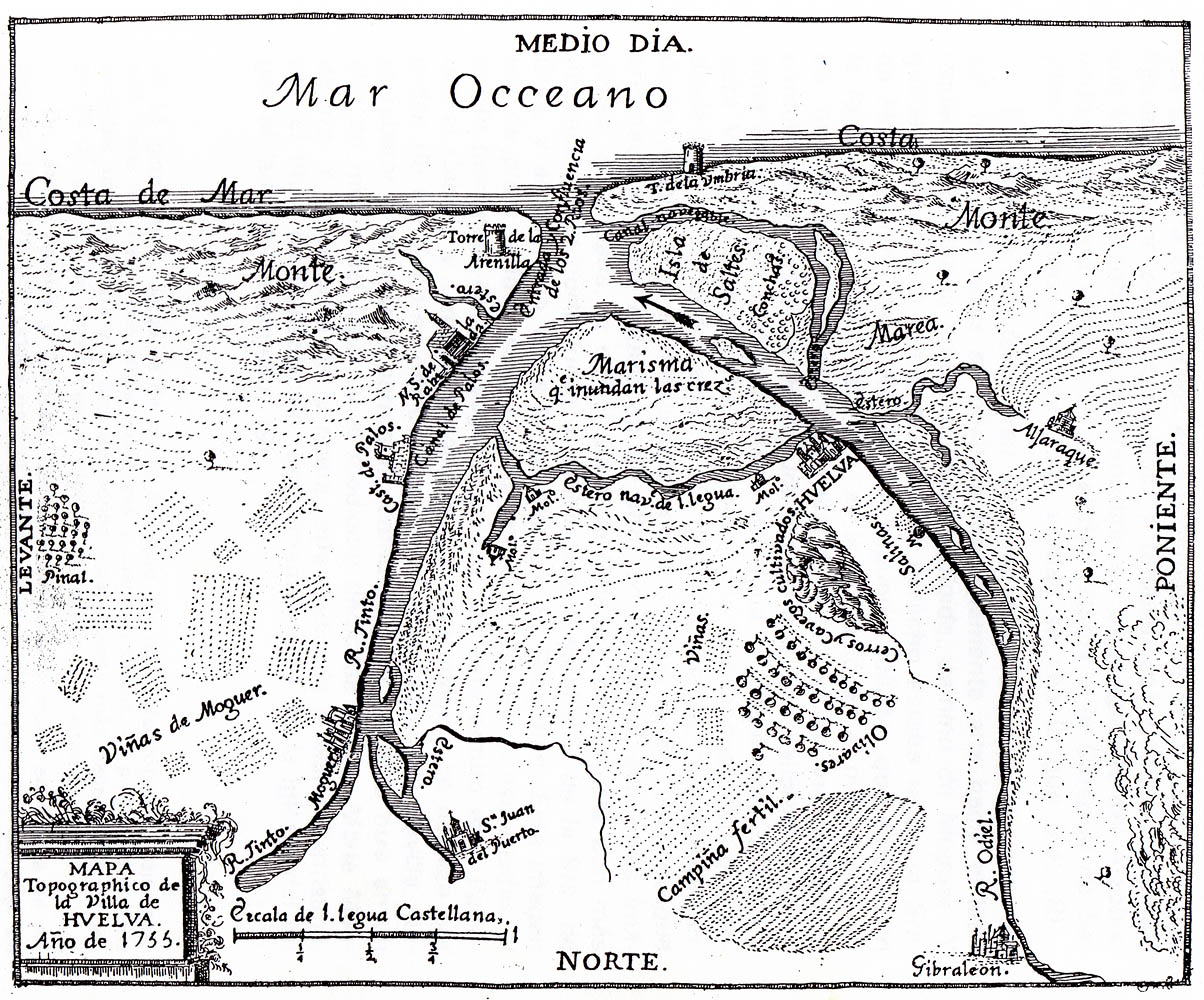
18th-century topographic map, showing the location of the old port of Palos.

For many, the expression port of Palos brings to mind the present-day port with its old wharf, the muelle de la Calzadilla from which the Plus Ultra flying boat departed in 1926 to cross the Atlantic. This is not the 15th century port. The municipal ordinances of the era (Ordenanzas Municipales de Palos (1484–1521)), focused mainly on regulating the town's maritime activities never use the terms puerto (port) or muelle (wharf). The caravels of Palos "arrived at the riverbank" ("aportaban a la ribera"), where they discharged their goods and auctioned their fish. That is to say, the activities of the port were not conducted in any single place, but along the length of the bank of the Río Tinto, because of the large number of ships and relatively high volume of merchandise they had to handle.

Progressively, the river became Palos's principal means of connection to the outside world and the port the axis of its relation to the surrounding towns. This maritime orientation modified the shape of the town, previously a conical area centered around the church and castle. The Calle de la Ribera ("Riverbank Street") connecting the town center to the port became the town's principal artery, and the port the authentic heart of the local economy.

On the eve of Columbus's first voyage, the entire riverbank between the present-day wharfs near the center of Palos and 3 kilometres (1.9 mi) away at La Rábida Monastery was an active port. The caravels anchored in the center of the river, where the depth was sufficient for their drafts, and paid for the rights to anchor there. From the caravels, boats and dinghies loaded or unloaded the goods "tying up to the shore" ("amarrando en la ribera"). The port had a population density similar to that to the town proper, from what we can deduce from the Ordenanza Municipal, which prohibited weapons on the riverbank because the people there were as tightly packed as in the town proper (the expression used is "tan aparejadas como en la Villa": aparejadas is nautical Spanish for something that has been furnished or supplied). Beginning in the first third of the 15th century, the port of Palos experienced continual economic growth, obtaining an importance well beyond the local area and achieving even international dimensions, as is testified by the frequent presence of English, Breton, Flemish, and Italian ships.

Following in the wake of the Portuguese, the ships of Palos traveled to the Canary Islands and Guinea, with their rich fisheries and the commercial possibility of trade in gold, spices, and slaves. In the second half of the 15th century, Palos reaches a population of three thousand. The alota of Palos, a type of customs warehouse, paid the largest tribute of any such facility to the Duke of Medina Sidonia, its primacy being such that it fishermen were recruited from other towns along the coast and two residents of Palos. Juan Venegas and Pedro Alonso Cansino, were placed in charge of giving licenses to fish in the Afro-Atlantic waters from Cabo Bojador to the Río de Oro, which they leased from the Catholic Monarchs Isabella and Ferdinand.

== The Pinzón family of Palos ==
The Pinzón family were one of the leading families of 14th-century Palos. The family may have come originally from the Kingdom of Aragón, but arrived in Andalusia either from la Montaña (now Cantabria) or from Asturias. According to some historians, this surname could have been a corruption of Espinzas or Pinzas ("tweezers"). Others say that the true family name was Martín, a widespread name with a long tradition in the area, the name of their grandfather, a sailor and diver in Palos, who was dubbed Pinzón when he went blind; that, combined with his hobby of singing gave him the nickname Pinzón, the Spanish word for chaffinch, because owners of chaffinches sometimes blinded them, supposedly making them sing more beautifully. His son, also a sailor named Martín Pinzón, was the father of the three Pinzón brothers. Their mother was named Mayor Vicente, so the three were full brothers and bore the surnames Pinzón and Vicente (Note: Often, their middle names—Alonso, Yáñez, and Martín, which they would have taken from their godfathers at their baptism—have been confused with surnames leading to the misconception that they were half-brothers.) (see Spanish naming customs).

=== Martín Alonso Pinzón ===
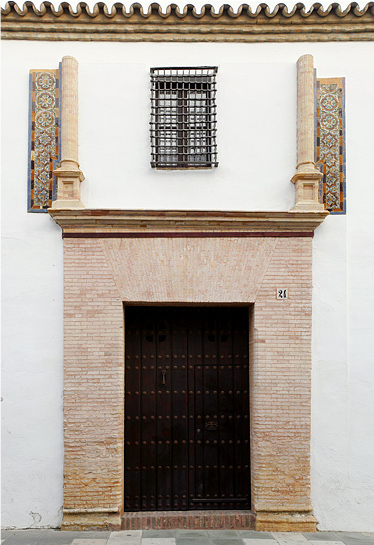
Pinzón family house in Palos, now Casa Museo de Martín Alonso Pinzón.

Martín Alonso Pinzón (c. 1441 – c. 31 March 1493) was the oldest of the brothers, and captain of the Pinta on Columbus's first voyage.

It appears that at quite a young age he shipped out on a locally based caravel as a grumete (cabin boy). His home, now the Casa Museo de Martín Alonso Pinzón, was on the old royal road to the Monastery of La Rábida. Martín's family contracted a marriage with a resident of the locality named María Álvarez. They had five children: two sons—Arias Pérez and Juan Pinzón, who participated in several expeditions to the Americas—and three daughters—Mayor, Catalina, and Leonor. Leonor, the youngest, suffered frequent attacks of what was then called "gota coral" and would now be called epilepsy.

His nautical experience and his leadership remained patent in the 1508–1536 lawsuits known as the pleitos colombinos, where the witnesses indicated him as the leader of the comarca (a region comparable to a shire). He was also famous for his battles against the Portuguese in the War of the Castilian Succession. (Note: Testimony in the pleitos colombinos: Gonzalo Martín, vecino of Huelva.... [M. A. Pinzón] ... was famous during his lifetime, and neither on sea nor land the King had no other man so valiant nor brave as him, and in the time that there was a war with Portugal all the Portuguese feared him because every day he took them and he lit them [set their boats on fire] and he made much war upon them .... Gonzalo Martín, vecino de Huelva.... [M. A. Pinzón] ... tenía fama en el tiempo que era vivo, y que por la mar ni por la tierra no tenía el Rey otro hombre tan valiente ni tan esforzado como el, e que en el tiempo que había guerra con Portugal todos los portugueses lo temían porque cada día los tomaba e los prendía e les facia mucha guerra .... Francisco Medel.... He was very knowledgeable in the art of navigation on all the seas, and no other man in all the Kingdom was so ardent for the things of war as he, nor as determined nor whose person had so much credit to do whatever thing ... Francisco Medel.... era hombre muy sabido en el arte de navegar por todos os mares, e era hombre que en todo el Reyno no había otro tan ardido para las cosas de la guerra como el, ni tan determinado ni que tanto crédito tuviese su persona para facer cualquiera cosa ... Cited in: Ortega 1980, Tomo III, p. 47.) It is probable that even while in Portugal before coming to Spain, Columbus was aware of Martín Alonso, because he was known for his participation in the war, as well as for his incursions into the Canary Islands and Guinea.

He was captain of the Pinta on Columbus's first voyage and supplied half a million ("medio cuento") maravedís in coin toward the cost of the voyage. Thanks to his prestige as a shipowner and expert sailor and his fame throughout the Tinto-Odiel region, he was able to enlist the crew required for Columbus's first voyage.

On 23 May 1492, the royal provision was read out to the residents of Palos, by which the Catholic Monarchs ordered that certain residents deliver two caravels to Columbus and travel with him on his voyage that he was making "by command of Their Highnesses" ("por mandado de Sus Altezas") and that the town should respect the royal decision. However, the locals did not comply. The sailors of Palos had no confidence in embarking on this adventure with Columbus, who was largely unknown to them. Independent of their greater or lesser credence in his ideas, the men of Palos found it difficult to support the Genovese sailor if he was not accompanied by a mariner known and respected in the town. The venture—risky and, above all, of uncertain profit—did not present great attractions. Opposition or indifference to Columbus's project was general.

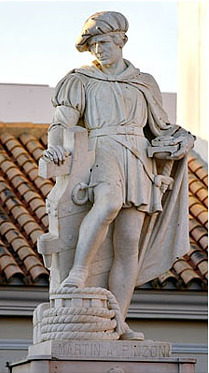
Statue of Martín Alonso Pinzón in Palos de la Frontera.

The Franciscans of the Monastery of La Rábida put Columbus in touch with Martín Alonso Pinzón. Pero Vázquez de la Frontera, an old mariner in the town—very respected for his experience, and a friend of Martín Alonso—also had an important influence on the oldest Pinzón brother deciding to support the undertaking, not only morally but also economically. Martín Alonso dismissed the vessels that Columbus had already seized based on the royal order and also dismissed the men he had enrolled, supplying the enterprise with two caravels of his own, the Pinta and the Niña, which he knew from his own experience would be better and more suitable boats. Furthermore, he traveled through Palos, Moguer and Huelva, convincing his relatives and friends to enlist, composing of them the best crew possible. He captained the caravel Pinta, from which Rodrigo de Triana was to be the first person to sight American soil.

Columbus, in his diary, spoke favorably of Pinzón on several occasions. Nonetheless, after they had discovered the West Indies, the relationship between the two changed radically from 21 November 1492, when Martín Alonso separated from Columbus. Admiral Columbus launched a series of accusations of desertion against Pinzón (Note: Ship's Diary: Wednesday, 21 November [1492]...This day Martín Alonso Pinzón departed with the caravel Pinta, without the obedience and will of the Admiral, out of greed, he says that an Indian that the Admiral had ordered to be put in that caravel had told him where to get much gold [the Spanish here, le había de dar mucho oro, is a bit obscure, but this seems to be the sense], and so he went away without waiting, without cause of bad weather, just because he wanted to. And here the Admiral says: «He did and said many other [things] to me». Miércoles, 21 de noviembre... Este día se apartó Martín Alonso Pinzón con la carabela Pinta, sin obediencia y voluntad del Almirante, por codicia, dice que pensando que un indio que el Almirante había mandado poner en aquella carabela le había de dar mucho oro, y así se fue sin esperar, sin causa de mal tiempo, sino porque quiso. Y dice aquí el Almirante: «otras muchas me tiene hecho y dicho». — Diario de la primera navegación, Narrative assembled by Fray Bartolomé de las Casas.) and his brothers, including Vicente who had saved him when the Santa María was shipwrecked. (Note: Ship's Diary: Tuesday, 8 January [1493] With such strong winds from the east and southeast he did not leave that day, because of which he ordered that that caravel be supplied with water and firewood and all that was necessary for the entire voyage, because although he intended to travel by ship along that whole Hispaniola coast as far as he could, but, because those he put in the caravels for commanders were brothers, to wit Martín Alonso Pinzón and Vicente Yáñez, and others who followed him with arrogance and greed estimating that everything was already theirs, not looking at the honor the Admiral had given them, they had not obeyed and did not obey his commands, before they had said and done many unmerited things against him, and this Martín Alonso left him from 21 November until 6 January without any cause or reason except disobedience, all of which the Admiral had suffered and been silent to bring a good end to his voyage, so that, to leave behind such bad company, with whom he says that it was necessary to dissimulate, although they were lawless people, and though he had to say while with them that they were good men*, because it was not the time to speak of punishment, he agreed to return and stop no more, as quickly as was possible ... * An effort to make sense of a rather obscure phrase, "y aunque tenía dice que consigo muchos hombres de bien"; possibly alternatively "and though he had to say that they had many good men with them". Martes, 8 de enero Por el viento Este y Sudeste mucho que ventaba no partió este día, por lo cual mandó que se guarneciese la carabela de agua y leña y de todo lo necesario para todo el viaje, porque, aunque tenía voluntad de costear toda la costa de aquella Española que andando el camino pudiese, pero, porque los que puso en las carabelas por capitanes eran hermanos, conviene a saber Martín Alonso Pinzón y Vicente Yáñez, y otros que le seguían con soberbia y codicia estimando que todo era ya suyo, no mirando la honra que el Almirante les había hecho y dado, no habían obedecido ni obedecían sus mandamientos, antes hacían y decían muchas cosas no debidas contra él, y el Martín Alonso lo dejó desde el 21 de noviembre hasta el 6 de enero sin causa alguna ni razón sino por su desobediencia, todo lo cual el Almirante había sufrido y callado por dar buen fin a su viaje, así que, por salir de tan mala compañía, con los cuales dice que cumplía disimular, aunque eran gente desmandada, y aunque tenía dice que consigo muchos hombres de bien, pero no era tiempo de entender en castigo, acordó volverse y no parar más, con la mayor prisa que le fue posible ... — Diario de la primera navegación, Narrative assembled by Bartolomé de las Casas.) Nonetheless, much of the testimony in the pleitos colombinos, as well as part of the specialized historiography and investigators, does not agree that these things happened in this manner, nor is there any accusation against Pinzón in Columbus's Letter on the First Voyage, which Columbus wrote on his return.

For Martín Alonso the return voyage was lethal, as the ships suffered from a great storm, which resulted in great fatigue and exhaustion, accumulated over many days of sailing. Because of this, Martín's recurrent fevers from which he suffered reactivated and he died a few days after returning from the New World. In fact, he was taken from his ship in a stretcher and, as Columbus arrived, his friends took him to a farm that was on the boundary between Palos and Moguer. It is possible that Martín's son, Arias Pérez Pinzón, did not bring him directly to his house in Palos in order to protect him, given that Columbus had threatened him earlier. Another possibility is that this was because Martín did not get along well with Catalina Alonso, the woman who had been living with his father since he became a widower, and with whom the father would have two illegitimate children: Francisco and Inés Pinzón. According to testimony, he was brought to the La Rábida Monastery, where he died; he was entombed there, as was his wish.

=== Francisco Martín Pinzón ===
Francisco Martín Pinzón (c. 1445 – c. 1502) (Note: Fernández-Carrión says Francisco Martín Pinzón was born entre 1445 y 1450 and that Rodrigo Álvarez testified in 1514 in the Pleitos Colombinos that he had died in 1502.) was the second of the brothers. On Columbus's first voyage he was the master (second only to the captain) of the Pinta, the first ship to sight land in the Americas. Although he was less known than his two brothers, he played a major role both in voyages of discovery and in service to the Crown.

His personal and family story is confused, because several relatives shared this same name, frequently leading historians to confuse them. Nonetheless, he seems to have been married to Juana Martín and to have had at least one daughter, who we find documented as "an orphan" and "poor" ("huérfana y pobre").

With his brother Vicente, he made several voyages to Italy and Africa in service to the Crown. In November 1493, together with Juan de Sevilla, Rodrigo de Quexo, and Fernando Quintero, he led an assault on the Algerian coast. In 1496 he brought money and supplies to the Spanish troops fighting in Naples. Later, he participated in Columbus's third and fourth voyages, on the last of which, according to his companion on many voyages, Rodrigo Álvarez, he died by drowning.

=== Vicente Yáñez Pinzón ===
Vicente Yáñez Pinzón (c. 1462 – c. September 1514) was the youngest brother. He was captain of the Niña on the first voyage of discovery. He later made other discoveries on his own account; historians consider him the discoverer of Brazil along with his cousin Diego de Lepe.

Considerably younger than his brothers, it is likely that his name Yáñez came from Rodrigo Yáñez, a bailiff (alguacil) of Palos who would then have been his godfather, according to the custom of the place. Tradition in Palos indicates that he lived on the Calle de la Ribera. From a young age, he learned the art of navigation from his oldest brother, and from adolescence he participated in combat and in military assaults, as he happened to reach this age during the War of the Castilian Succession.

He married twice, first to Teresa Rodríguez, with whom he had two daughters, Ana Rodríguez and Juana González. After his final return from the Yucatán in 1509 he married Ana Núñez de Trujillo, with whom he lived in Triana (across the river from Seville), probably until his death.

The first we hear of Vicente Yáñez is when he is denounced for assaults on Aragonese boats, some with his oldest brother, (Note: PARES.: Comisión al asistente de Sevilla a petición de Bernaldo Galamo y consortes, vecinos de Ibiza, sobre la presa de un ballener que les fué tomado por Martín Alonso y Vicente Yáñez Pinzón, vecinos de Palos. Archivo General de Simancas. Unidad: Cancillería. Registro del Sello de Corte. RGS,148001,54.) when he was only 15 years old. This was between 1477 and 1479, during the War of the Castilian Succession (with Portugal) in which Palos participated actively and through which its habitual shortage of grain was aggravated: its residents complained of hunger. Royal orders to various places that were supposed to supply Palos with cereals (Note: PARES.: 1477: "Letter to the councils and residents of the cities of Seville and Jerez de la Frontera, at the petition of the council and residents of the town of Palos, ordering them to allow them to take from said cities all the bread they need for their." "Carta a los concejos y vecinos de las ciudades de Sevilla y de Jerez de la Frontera, a petición del concejo y vecinos de la villa de Palos, ordenándoles que dejen a éstos sacar de dichas ciudades todo el pan que necesitaren para su provision." Archivo General de Simancas. Unidad: Cancillería. Registro del Sello de Corte. Signatura: RGS,147705,194.; 1478: "Provision to the petition of the town of Palos to be given a letter allowing it to take bread from certain cities in Andalusia, given in virtue of laws by the court of Burgos of 1453 and Córdoba of 1455 that are inserted." "Provisión a petición de la villa de Palos para que le sea guardada una carta facultándole la saca de pan de ciertas ciudades de Andalucía, dada en virtud de leyes de cortes de Burgos de 1453 y Córdoba de 1455 que se insertan." Archivo General de Simancas. Unidad: Cancillería. Registro del Sello de Corte. Signatura: RGS,147808,95.) were disobeyed. The Pinzón brothers, taking on their responsibilities as natural leaders of the district, attacked caravels that were transporting mainly grain.

Vicente immediately supported his brother, Martín Alonso, when Martin decided to back Columbus's undertaking. The two worked together to enlist men from the Tinto-Odiel for the risky voyage. He was chosen as captain of the Niña and distinguished himself during the voyage. This involved, among other accomplishments, helping to put down several attempts at mutiny together with his older brother. He provided support, both to Columbus and the rest of the crew, after the Santa María was wrecked. With his flagship gone, the admiral made his return voyage in the Niña, captained by Vicente, who provided all the help necessary for a successful return voyage.

He made several more expeditions to the Americas, the most important being the voyage to the mouth of the Amazon which constituted the discovery of Brazil, in early 1500. That expedition was an economic failure. In 1505 he was made the governor of Puerto Rico. Later, in 1506, he returned to the Caribbean to search for a passage to the Pacific Ocean. He explored all of the Caribbean coast of Central America and the Yucatan Peninsula.

According to the chronicler Gonzalo Fernández de Oviedo y Valdés, Vicente Yáñez died in 1514, probably at the end of September. It is not known precisely where he is buried, but Oviedo states that it is somewhere in the cemetery of Triana.

== The Pinzón brothers and the discovery of America ==
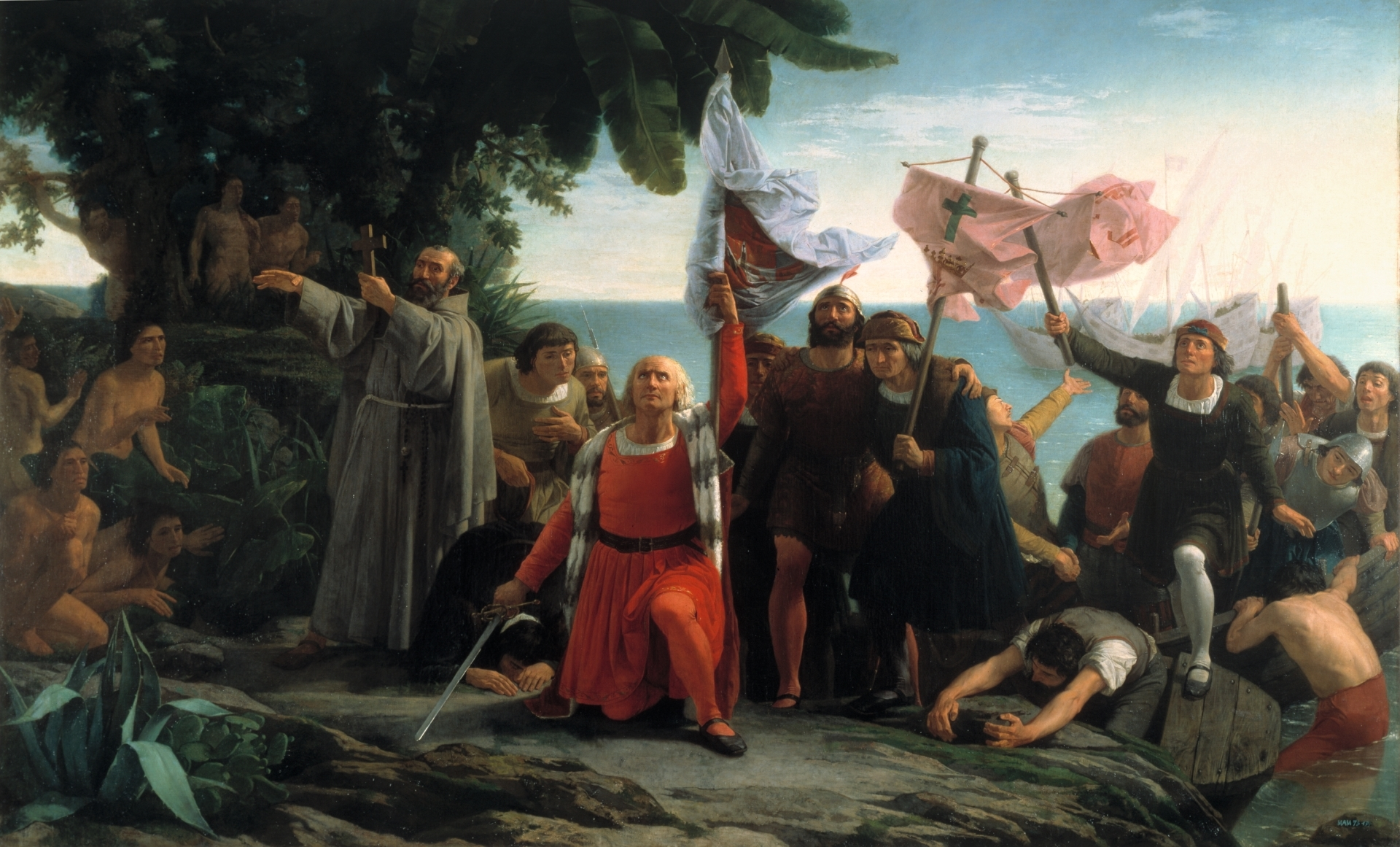
Columbus and the Pinzón brothers arrive in America. Painting by Dióscoro Puebla (1862)

The participation of the Pinzón brothers was crucial to Columbus's first voyage, especially in that few were disposed to enlist with Columbus until Martín Alonso, a wealthy and famous shipbuilder in the Tinto-Odiel region, gave his support to the enterprise. Once Martín Alonso gave his support, he undertook a veritable campaign on behalf of the undertaking. His support and that of his brothers and of other distinguished families of mariners in the region served to recruit the necessary crew: sailors from Palos, Huelva, and even from beyond Andalusia. The testimony in the pleitos colombinos indicates that the Pinzón brothers, above all Martín:

... brought such diligence to secure and animate the people as if what were discovered were for him and his sons.

Among these other families, the Niño brothers of Moguer stand out: their prestige and influence brought the men of Moguer to unite around the enterprise.

During the voyage of discovery, they demonstrated on several occasions their gifts as expert mariners and as leaders, in that they knew how to master the most diverse and difficult situations. For example, they were able to continue sailing, even after the damage that occurred to the Pinta when the tiller broke, before they reached the Canary Islands, (Note: Ship's Diary: Monday, 6 August [1492] The tiller of the caravel Pinta, [the caravel] where Martín Alonso Pinzón was, snapped or was put out of joint, of which the work of one Gómez Rascón and Cristóbal Quintero, who owned the caravel, was believed and suspected, because they regretted going on this voyage and the Admiral said that before leaving there had been a certain amount of hesitation and hubbub about them. Seeing it there, the Admiral was quite perturbed not to be able to help that caravel without danger to his own, but that he was a bit less worried knowing that Martín Alonso Pinzón was a vigorous and ingenious person. Finally, they went between day and night twenty-nine leagues. During the crossing, he showed his abilities as a sailor when he resolved the problem of the broken tiller of the Pinta and was able to continue sailing. Lunes, 6 de agosto Saltó o desencajóse el gobernario a la carabela Pinta, donde iba Martín Alonso Pinzón, a lo que se creyó y sospechó por industria de un Gómez Rascón y Cristóbal Quintero, cuya era la carabela, porque le pesaba ir en aquel viaje; y dice el Almirante que antes de que partiese habían hallado en ciertos reveses y grisquetas como dicen, a los dichos. Viose allí el Almirante en gran turbación por no poder ayudar a la dicha carabela sin su peligro, y dice que alguna pena perdía con saber que Martín Alonso Pinzón era persona esforzada y de buen ingenio. En fin, anduvieron entre día y noche veintinueve leguas. Durante la travesía, demostró sus habilidades de marinero cuando resolvió el problema de la rotura del timón de La Pinta y pudo seguir navegando. — Diario de la primera navegación. Narrative assembled by Bartolomé de las Casas.) and when, between 6 and 7 October 1492 Columbus was unable to reestablish discipline among the tired and discouraged crew of the Santa María, Martín Alonso with his gift of command managed to resolve the situation. (Note: Testimony in the pleitos colombinos by Hernán Pérez Mateos, former pilot of Palos, age 80, given in Santo Domingo 26 January 1536. Archivo General de Indias. Sección: Patronato. Signatura: PATRONATO, 12, N.2, R.14.... as they did not discover land, those who went with the said Columbus wanted to mutiny and rise against him, saying they were lost, and then the said Columbus had said to Martín Alonso what was going on among these people, and what it seemed to him they ought to do; and that the said Martín Alonso Pinzón had responded to him; «Sir; hang half a dozen of them and throw them into the sea, and if you dare not, I and my brothers will get up close to them and do it, that an armada that left with the mandate of such high princes not have to return without good news.» And that he knew that with that they would regain their spirits; and the said Columbus had said; «Martin Alonso; lets make things good with these gentlemen and travel another eight days, and if in that time we don't find land, we will give another order on what we ought to do.» ...... como no descubrían tierra, los que venían con el dicho Colón se querían amotinar y alzar contra el, diciendo que iban perdidos, y entonces el dicho Colón había dicho a Martín Alonso lo que pasaba con aquella gente, y que qué le parescía que debían hacer; e que el dicho Martín Alonso Pinzón le había respondido; «Señor; ahorque vuesa merced a media docena dellos e échelos al mar, y si no se atreve, yo e mis hermanos barloaremos sobre ellos y lo haremos, que armada que salio con mandato de tan altos principes no ha de volver atras sin buenas nuevas.» Y que sabe que con esto se animaron; y el dicho Colón había dicho; «Martin Alonso; con estos hidalgos hayamonos bien y andemos otros ocho días, e si en estos no hayamos tierra, daremos otra orden en lo que debemos hacer.» ... Cited in: Ortega 1980, Tomo II, p. 213) Martín Alonso suggested to Columbus the change of course on 6 October 1492; (Note: Ship's Diary: Saturday, 6 October [1492]. He navigated his way to the west. Then went forty leagues between day and night; he told the people thirty-three leagues. That night Martín Alonso said it would be set course southwest by west; and to the Admiral it seemed that this Martín Alonso said this because of the island of Cipango (Japan), and the Admiral saw that if they missed it they could not soon find land quickly and that it would be better off to go first to the mainland and later to the islands. Sábado, 6 de octubre. Navegó su camino al Oeste o Güeste, que es lo mismo. Anduvieron cuarenta leguas entre día y noche; contó a la gente treinta y tres leguas. Esta noche dijo Martín Alonso que sería bien navegar a la cuarta del Oeste, a la parte del Sudoeste; y al Almirante pareció que no decía esto Martín Alonso por la isla de Cipango, y el Almirante veía que si la erraban que no pudieran tan presto tomar tierra y que era mejor una vez ir a la tierra firme y después a las islas. — Diario de la primera navegación. Narrative assembled by Bartolomé de las Casas.) A few days later, on 9 October he proposed a compromise that won a few more days from the restless crew. The course he urged brought the expedition to landfall on Guanahani on 12 October 1492. When the Santa María wrecked on 25 December, Vicente Yáñez in command of the Niña went to the rescue of those left in this difficult situation. (Note: Ship's Diary. Tuesday 25 December, Christmas Day. ... When he saw that it was his people who were fleeing [they had been put in a boat to assist the grounded Santa María, but instead tried to run away], and that the waters were dwindling and that the ship was already crosswise to the sea, not seeing any other way, he ordered that the mast be cut and to lighten the ship by getting rid of everything they could to see if they could get her out; and as the waters [over the bank on which they were grounded] were still dwindling there was no remedy, and she was listing toward the cross sea, given that there was little or no sea [under them], and then the planking opened up, but not the ship [that is, the ship did not yet break up]. The Admiral went to the caravel that is, the ''Niña'' to put in safety the men from the ship in the caravel and, as there was now a light breeze from the land and also much of the night remained, and they did not know how far the banks extended, he kept getting on and off until daytime, and later went to the ship from within the shoal of the bank... Martes 25 de diciembre, día de Navidad.... Cuando el Almirante vio que se huían y que era su gente, y las aguas menguaban y estaba ya la nao la mar de través, no viendo otro medio, mandó cortar el mástil y alijar de la nao todo cuanto pudieron para ver si podían sacarla; y como todavía las aguas menguasen no se pudo remediar, y tomó lado hacia la mar traviesa, puesto que la mar era poco o nada, y entonces se abrieron los conventos y no la nao. El Almirante fue a la carabela para poner en cobro la gente de la nao en la carabela y, como ventase ya vientecillo de la tierra y también aún quedaba mucho de la noche, ni supiesen cuánto duraban los bancos, temporejó a la corda hasta que fue de día, y luego fue a la nao por de dentro de la restinga del banco... — Diario de la primera navegación. Narrative assembled by Bartolomé de las Casas.)

For these and other acts, the Pinzón brothers have a very notable place in the history of the discovery of America, and are considered by historians as "co-discoverers of America", in that without their help, support, and courage, Columbus probably could not have achieved his enterprise of discovery, at least not in that time and place.

== Other voyages ==
Although the oldest of the Pinzón brothers, Martín Alonso, died a few days after returning from Columbus's first voyage, that was by no means the end of the participation of the Pinzóns in voyages of discovery and other sea journeys.

Francisco and Vicente made various voyages to Italy and Africa in service to the Crown. As mentioned above, in November 1493, Francisco, along with Juan de Sevilla, Rodrigo de Quexo, and Fernando Quintero, led an assault on the Algerian coast. In 1496 they brought money and supplies to the Spanish troops fighting in Naples. In 1498 he participated in Columbus's third voyage, in which for the first time the Admiral arrived on the continent of South America.

Later in 1498, the Crown decided to end Columbus's monopoly on voyages of discovery. The series of voyages by other mariners are generally known as the "minor voyages" or the "Andalusian voyages" of discovery. After contracting with the crown, on 19 November 1499 Vicente left the port of Palos with four small caravels, crewed largely by his relatives and friends, among them his brother Francisco and also the famous physician of Palos Garcí Fernández, an early supporter of Columbus's first voyage. On this voyage, they discovered Brazil and the Amazon River.

On 5 September 1501, the Crown signed an agreement with Vicente in which, among other things, he was named Captain and Governor of the Cabo de Santa María de la Consolación, later Cabo de Santo Agostinho.

In 1502, Francisco traveled with Columbus on his fourth and final voyage; it is on this voyage he is believed to have died by drowning.

Vicente continued to travel back and forth across the Atlantic to fulfill his obligations as Captain General and Governor. He also participated as one of the experts brought together by the Crown in the Junta de Navegantes in Burgos in 1508 to take up anew the subject of the search for a passage to the Spice Islands. On his final voyage, along with captain Juan Díaz de Solís, he followed the coasts of Darién, Veragua and the Gulf of Paria, now Venezuela, Colombia, Panama, Costa Rica, Nicaragua, Honduras, and Guatemala. Not finding the desired passage, he rounded the Yucatan Peninsula and entered into the Gulf of Mexico to the extent of 23.5º north latitude, bringing about one of the first European contacts with the Aztec civilization.

The Pinzón coat of arms.

Upon returning from this voyage, Vicente Yáñez married for the second time and settled in Triana. In 1513 he testified against Columbus in the pleitos colombinos. In 1514, he was ordered to accompany Pedrarias Dávila to Darién, but he was not well enough and begged to be excused. That was on 14 March 1514, and it is the last primary source document in which he is mentioned.

== Coat of arms granted by Charles I of Spain ==
In 1519, a petition to Charles I of Spain, headed by Juan Rodríguez Mafra, requested the grant of a coat of arms to the Pinzóns and other mariners of Palos, exposing the lamentable situation of the descendants of those mariners who had offered such service to the Crown. The king finally conceded to the Pinzóns, their descendants and family members a coat of arms consisting of a shield with three caravels, natural, on the sea; from each a hand points to an island representing the first land discovered in the New World. Around that, a border with anchors and crowns. (Note: Archivo General de Indias Sección Indiferente General. Signatura: INDIFERENTE, 420, L.8, F.146R-147V. Royal Provision of King Don Carlos conceded to Juan Rodríguez Mafra, pilot, Gómez Muñoz, chaplain, Diego Martín Pinzón, Alvaro Alonso, notaries, Juan Pinzón and Alonso González, residents and naturals of the town of Palos, the mercy of the power to use a coat of arms with three caravels, from each of them a hand reaches out, and on the border, some anchors and some crowns, doing to them said mercy in reward for the services performed in the discovery of the Indies by their respective ancestors: Martín Alonso Pinzón, Vicente Yáñez Pinzón, Andrés González Pinzón, Diego de Lepe, and Miguel Alonso. Real Provisión del Rey D. Carlos concediendo a Juan Rodríguez Mafra, piloto, Gómez Muñoz, capellán, Diego Martín Pinzón, Alvaro Alonso, notarios, Juan Pinzón y Alonso González, vecinos y naturales de la villa de Palos, la merced de poder usar un escudo de armas con tres carabelas, de cada una de las cuales salga una mano, y por orlas, unas áncoras y unos corazones, haciéndoles dicha merced en premio a los servicios que en el descubrimiento de las Indias hicieron sus antepasados respectivos: Martín Alonso Pinzón, Vicente Yáñez Pinzón, Andrés González Pinzón, Diego de Lepe y Miguel Alonso.: Íñiguez Sánchez-Arjona 1991, p. 105-106)

== See also ==
- Lugares colombinos
- List of explorers
- Juan de la Cosa
- Columbian exchange
