= Felipa Colón de Toledo, 2nd Duchess of Veragua =

Spanish noblewoman (c.1550–1577)

Felipa Colón de Toledo

2nd Duchess of Veragua
- In office 3 February 1572 – 25 November 1577
- Monarch: Philip II
- Preceded by: Luis Colón de Toledo, 1st Duke
- Succeeded by: Cristóbal Colón de Toledo y Cardona, 3rd Duke

2nd Marchioness of Jamaica
- In office 3 February 1572 – 25 November 1577
- Monarch: Philip II
- Preceded by: Luis Colon de Toledo, 1st Marquess
- Succeeded by: Cristóbal Colón de Toledo y Cardona, 3rd Marquess

2nd Duchess of La Vega
- In office 3 February 1572 – 25 November 1577
- Monarch: Philip II
- Preceded by: Luis Colon de Toledo, 1st Duke
- Succeeded by: Cristóbal Colón de Toledo y Cardona, 3rd Duke

Personal details
- Born: c. 1550 Santo Domingo, Captaincy General of Santo Domingo
- Died: November 25, 1577 (aged 27) Spain
- Spouse: Diego Colón de Toledo
- Parent(s): Luis Colón de Toledo; María de Mosquera y Pasamonte

Felipa Colón de Toledo y Mosquera, 2nd Duchess of Veragua, 2nd Duchess of la Vega, 2nd Marchioness of Jamaica (c. 1550 – 25 November 1577), was the second daughter and heiress of Luis Colón de Toledo, 1st Duke of Veragua and of la Vega, and his first wife María de Mosquera y Pasamonte. She was a great-granddaughter of famous explorer Christopher Columbus and his Portuguese wife Filipa Moniz Perestrelo.

She married her first cousin Diego Colón de Toledo, 4th Admiral of the Indies; they had no children. Her husband held that office, which she had inherited, in her place. She was succeeded by her paternal cousin Cristóbal Colón de Toledo y Cardona (around 1545-1583).

== See also ==
- Dukedom of Veragua
- Veragua
- Pleitos colombinos
