= María de Toledo =

Spanish noblewoman

María de Toledo or María Álvarez de Toledo or María Álvarez de Toledo y Rojas (1490 – 11 May 1549) was a Spanish noblewoman and the first woman in the Americas with the title of Vicereine and regent of the Spanish Captaincy General of Santo Domingo, present day Dominican Republic. She was the most powerful and highest-ranking noble in America in the 16th century and a defender of the liberties of the Indigenous people in the Hispaniola.

== Life ==
Maria de Toledo was granddaughter of García Álvarez de Toledo, 1st Duke of Alba and niece of Fadrique Álvarez de Toledo, 2nd Duke of Alba, cousin of King Ferdinand II of Aragon "The Catholic".

She was married to Diego Columbus, the son of Christopher Columbus. Her spouse was viceroy of the Hispaniola. They resided in the Alcázar de Colón in Santo Domingo.

During the absence of her husband from 1514 until 1520, she was left in charge of the settlement along with Jerónimo de Agüero. In 1523, when Diego was recalled a second time, she was named virreina. She was then expecting their eighth child.

== Issue ==
- María Colón de Toledo (c. 1510 –), married to Sancho Folch de Cardona, 1st Marquess of Guadalest. They were parents of Cristóbal Colón de Toledo y Cardona (1535–1583), 3rd Duke of Veragua, 3rd Duke of La Vega and 3rd Marquess of Jamaica.
- Luis Colón, 1st Duke of Veragua, Grandee, 1st Duke of La Vega and 1st Marquess of Jamaica.
- Cristóbal Colón de Toledo (c. 1510 – 1571), married firstly to María Leonor Lerma de Zuazo, without issue; married secondly to Ana de Pravia, and had one son (Diego Colon y Pravia [c. 1551 - Jan 27, 1578]) and one daughter (Francisca Colon y Pravia, [c. 1552 - April 1616]; and married thirdly to María Magadalena de Guzmán y Anaya, and had:
  - Diego Colón de Toledo, 4th Admiral of the Indies iure uxoris
  - Francisca Colón de Toledo y Pravia (c. 1550 – April, 1616), married Diego de Ortegón (c. 1550 –), and had four children: Guiomar de Ortegon y Colon [d. 1621]; Jacoba de Oretgon y Colon [d. 1618]; Ana de Ortegon y Colon; and Josefa de Ortegon y Colon
  - María Colón de Toledo y Guzmán (c. 1550 –), married to Luis de Avila, and had:
    - Cristóbal de Avila y Colón (1579 –), unmarried and without issue
    - Luis de Avila y Colón (1582–1633), married Maria de Rojas-Guzman Grajeda, without issue; married secondly to Francisca de Sandoval and had one son Cristobal
    - Juan Colón Dávila (-1622)
    - Bernardino Dávila y Colón (-1633)
    - Maria de Avila y Colón (1592-), married Alonso de Guzman Grajeda and had one daughter (Mayor de Grajeda y Avila [c.1611-]
- Juana Colón de Toledo (died c. 1592), married her cousin Luis de La Cueva y Toledo; their only child was María Colón de la Cueva (c. 1548-c.1600) who claimed the duchy of Veragua and died in New Spain (México).
- Isabel Colón de Toledo (c. 1515 –), married Don Jorge Alberto de Portugal y Melo (1470 –), 1st Count of Gelves (who married secondly; his 1st marriage to Dona Guiomar de Ataíde remained childless), son of Don Álvaro de Bragança, Lord of Tentúgal, Póvoa, Buarcos and Cadaval and Chancellor-Major of the Realm of Portugal. Their grandson, Nuño Colón de Portugal, was the 4th Duke of Veragua and Admiral of the Indies, and became regent of the Kingdom of Portugal from 1621 until his death the following year.
