= Columbian Viceroyalty =

Name that designates the number of titles and rights granted to Christopher Columbus

Viceroyalty of the Indies Virreinato de las Indias (Spanish)
- 1492–1535
- Flag Coat of arms

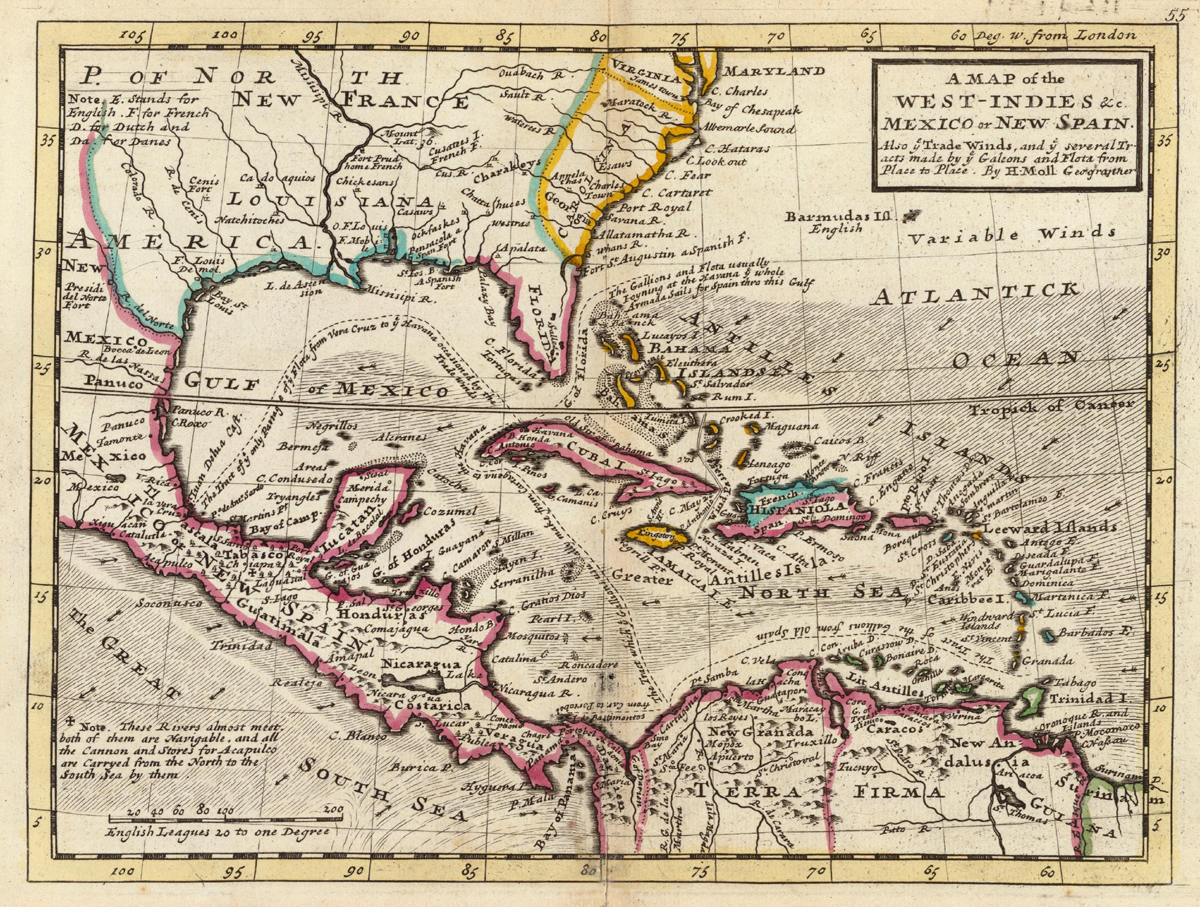
- Status: Viceroyalty of the Spanish Empire
- Capital: La Isabela (1494-1496); Santo Domingo (1496-1535)
- Official languages: Spanish
- Government: Monarchy
- Monarch
  - 1492–1504: Isabella I & Ferdinand V (first)
  - 1504–1535: Joanna I co-monarchs: Philip I (1506); Charles I (1516-)
- Governor
  - 1492–1499: Christopher Columbus (Viceroy)
  - 1499–1502: Francisco de Bobadilla
  - 1502–1509: Nicolás de Ovando
  - 1509–1526: Diego Columbus (Viceroy)
- History
  - Discovery of the Americas: 1492
  - Foundation of La Isabela: 1494
  - Battle of La Vega Real: 1495
  - Foundation of Santo Domingo: 1502
  - Conquest of Puerto Rico: 1508
  - Conquest of Jamaica: 1509
  - Conquest of Cuba: 1511
  - Became the Viceroyalty of New Spain: 1535
- Currency: Santo Domingo real
| Preceded by | Succeeded by |
| Chiefdoms of Hispaniola | New Spain; Captaincy General of Santo Domingo |
- Today part of: Dominican Republic

The Columbian Viceroyalty, Viceroyalty of the Indies or First Viceroyalty in the Indies is the name that designates the number of titles and rights granted to Christopher Columbus by the Catholic Monarchs in 1492 on the lands discovered and undiscovered, before embarking on his first trip that culminated in the colonization of the Americas.

== Origins ==
The titles and powers over discovered lands granted to Christopher Columbus were entered in the capitulations of Santa Fe agreed on April 17 of 1492. Under them, the Catholic Monarchs, Isabella and Ferdinand, awarded for the period of his life, and after his death, to be conferred on his heirs or Successors one after the other perpetually:

- The title of Admiral of the Ocean Sea over all the islands and the mainland that discovered or won in this sea.
- The titles, always referred to together, of "Viceroy and Governor General".

In addition, other powers and economic prerogatives.

[...]
Firstly, that Your Highnesses, Masters as you are of the said Oceans, hereby and henceforth make Don Christopher Columbus your admiral in all those islands and all that land which, by his hand or industry, may be discovered or won in the said Oceans for the period of his life, and after his death, to be conferred on his heirs or Successors one after the other perpetually with all the privileges and prerogatives attendant thereto, and his successors in the said rank enjoyed them in their districts. ...

Furthermore, that Your Highnesses make the said Don Christopher Columbus your Viceroy and Governor General in all the said islands and land which as said herein he should discover or win in the said Oceans, and that for the government of each and every of them, he should elect three persons for each rank, and that Your Highnesses should take and choose the one who is most suited to your service, so that in this way the lands which Our Lord permits him to find or win in Your Highnesses service may be better ruled.
[...]

These titles would be confirmed by the monarchs on his return from his first voyage in May 1493. Of these, the best known in Castile, which paid the most attention both Columbus and the monarchs, was the Admiral.

== History ==
According to the capitulations of Santa Fe, all lands discovered by Christopher Columbus were part of his viceroyalty.

On his first voyage to the Americas in 1492-1493, Columbus discovered the Bahamas, Cuba, and Hispaniola, and acted as viceroy and governor there. Before returning to Spain, he founded La Navidad in Hispaniola on 25 December 1492. This was a fort held by 39 men. The Indians of the island soon destroyed the fort, killing all its occupants.

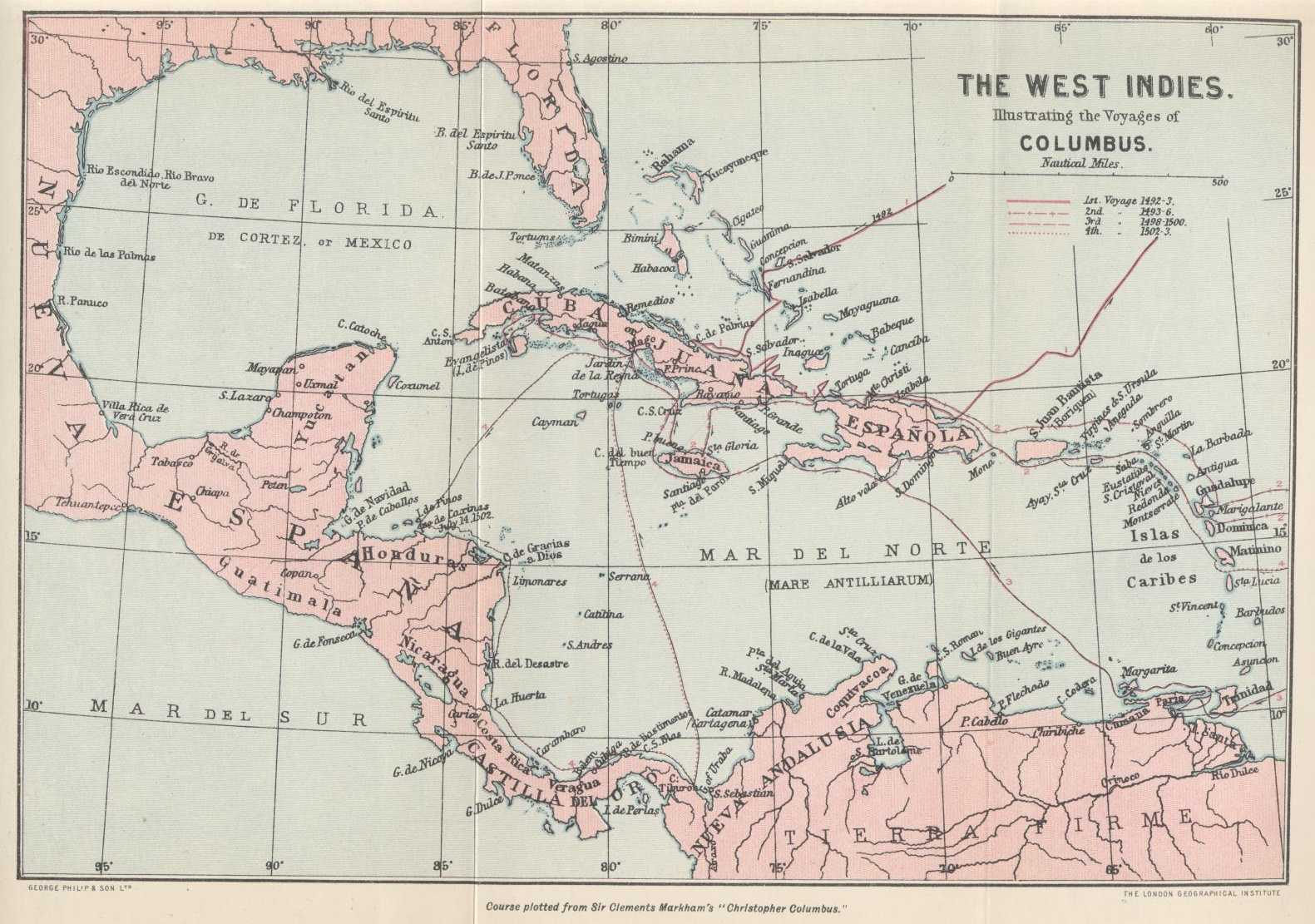
Christopher Columbus Travels

On his second voyage in 1493-1496, Columbus discovered Dominica, Guadeloupe, the Leeward Islands, and Puerto Rico, where he arrived on 19 November 1493. Later he found Jamaica and explored Cuba.

On his third voyage in 1498–1500, he discovered the Paria Peninsula, Trinidad, and Margarita Island. He remained until 1500 in Hispaniola.

Columbus established Spanish rule over the Indians of the islands he discovered, demanding tribute in the form of gold, food, and labor. He appointed his brothers as his deputies, and quarreled with the colonists sent from Spain, provoking mutinies and rebellions.

Many complaints about Columbus as viceroy reached King Ferdinand and Queen Isabella. In 1499, they appointed Francisco de Bobadilla as pesquisador (judge with government functions) to investigate. Bobadilla arrived in Hispaniola 23 August 1500. He arrested Columbus and his brothers, whom he sent to Spain, and assumed the governorship. In Spain, Columbus regained his freedom and viceroyalty, but Nicolas de Ovando was appointed governor in 1501.

Ferdinand and Isabella funded his fourth voyage in 1502. Columbus found Martinique, then explored the Central American coast from the Bay Islands to the Gulf of Urabá. He remained in Jamaica until 1504 and then returned to Spain, where he died in 1506.

Meanwhile, Ovando went with his own fleet to Hispaniola, where he deposed and replaced Bobadilla. Ovando brought 2,500 colonists as well. He ruled as governor until 1509.

Starting in 1499, Ferdinand and Isabella authorized voyages of discovery to the New World by other explorers. These explorers became governors of the territories they discovered, which were exempted from the Viceroyalty of the Indies. Alonso de Ojeda explored the coast of Venezuela, and was appointed governor of Coquivacoa and later of Nueva Andalucia; Vicente Yanez Pinzon explored northeastern Brazil.

== The Viceroyalty after the death of Columbus ==
On Christopher Columbus's death his eldest son Diego Columbus inherited his father's rights in the Americas, including the viceroyalty. However, King Ferdinand refused at first to transfer all rights of his father and appointed him governor of Hispaniola in 1508. Diego began a series of lawsuits against the crown known as the Columbian Lawsuits, and in 1511 his rights as viceroy were recognized, but with limited jurisdiction over those territories that had been officially discovered by his father. Consequently, Diego Columbus became the second Viceroy of the Indies. He died in 1526 bequeathing his rights to the viceroyalty to his son Luis Colón.

In 1536, during Luis Colón's age minority, the transaction and arbitration that ended the Columbian Lawsuits with the Spanish Crown took place. In 1537, he received from the Crown the noble title of Duke of Veragua and a territorial lordship of 625 square leagues, comprising lands of the former Veragua and Castilla del Oro. He was also granted the hereditary dignity of Marquess of Jamaica and the lordship of that island, thus ending the Viceroyalty of the Indies, which was merged into the newly-created Viceroyalty of New Spain in 1535.

== Bibliography ==
- Dougnac Rodriguez, Antonio (1994). "Capítulo 5: Gobierno, justicia, guerra, y hacienda. Autoridades radicadas en indias" [Chapter 5. Government, justice, war and finance. Authorities resident in the Indies. I. Government of Christopher Columbus (1492-1500) and IV. Government of Diego Columbus (1509-1523)]. Manual de historia del derecho indiano [Manual of History of the Law of the Indies] (in Spanish). National Autonomous University of Mexico. ISBN 968-36-4147-4.
- Ortuño Sánchez-Pedroza, José María (1990). "The first viceroy of the Indies: Christopher Columbus (1492-1506)". Annals of Law, University of Murcia (10). p. 235-250.
- Sánchez Bella, Ismael (1990). "The political organization of Spanish America". Chilena Magazine of History of Law (15). p. 205-217.
