= Diego Gutiérrez =

Diego Gutiérrez may refer to:

== Politicians ==
- Diego Gutiérrez y Toledo (1510–1544), Spanish governor in Costa Rica
- Diego Gutiérrez de Humanes (1607–1660s), Spanish governor in Argentina

== Sportspeople ==
- Diego Gutiérrez (soccer, born 1972), American soccer midfielder
- Diego Gutiérrez (volleyball) (born 1976), Argentine volleyball player
- Diego Gutiérrez (soccer, born 1997), Canadian soccer midfielder
- Diego Gutierrez (soccer, born 1999), American soccer forward
- Diego Gutiérrez (footballer, born 2000), Spanish footballer

== Others ==
- Diego Gutiérrez (cartographer) (fl. 16th century), Spanish map maker
- Diego Gutiérrez (singer-songwriter) (born 1974), Cuban singer-songwriter
