= Diego Colón de Toledo, 4th Admiral of the Indies =

Diego Colón de Toledo y Pravia, 4th Admiral of the Indies (died 28 January 1578) was a paternal grandson of Diego Colón and his wife María de Toledo y Rojas, making him a great-grandson of Christopher Columbus.

He married his first cousin Felipa Colón de Toledo, 2nd Duchess of Veragua, the second daughter and heiress of Luis Colón de Toledo, 1st Duke of Veragua, and his first wife María de Mosquera y Pasamonte, without issue. He held the Almirante de las Índias office in her place, which she had inherited.

== See also ==
- Dukedom of Veragua
- Pleitos colombinos

Military offices
| Preceded by Luis Colón de Toledo | Admiral of the Indies; 1572–1578 | Succeeded by / |
