= New Carthage =

New Carthage may refer to:

- Nuevo Cartago y Costa Rica Province
- Qart-Hadast (Spain), now Cartagena (which may be the same as Mastia)
- Carthago Nova, the name of today's Cartagena after the Roman conquest
- New Carthage, Louisiana
