= Alcázar de Colón =

Fortified castle in the Dominican Republic

UNESCO World Heritage Site
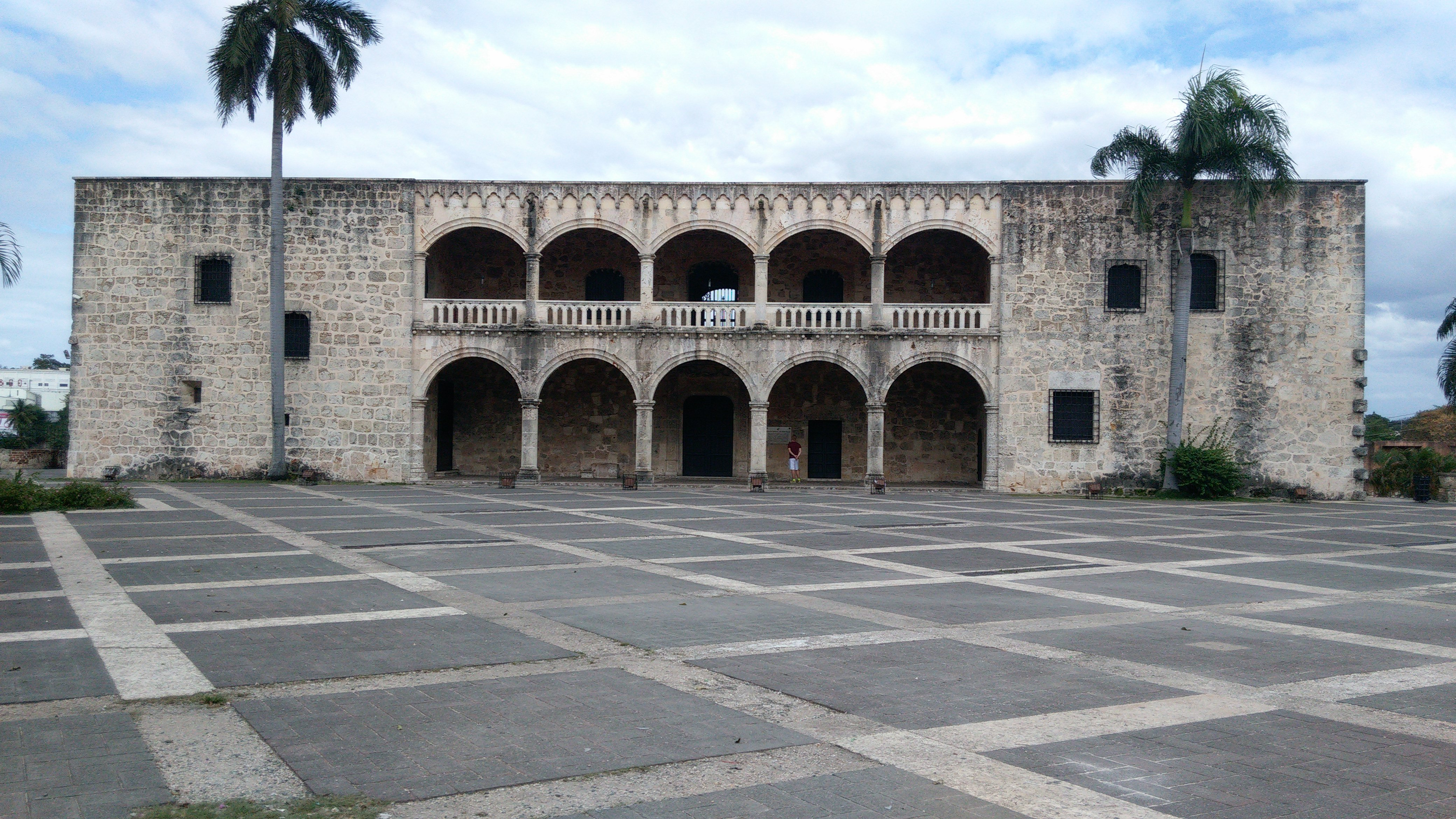
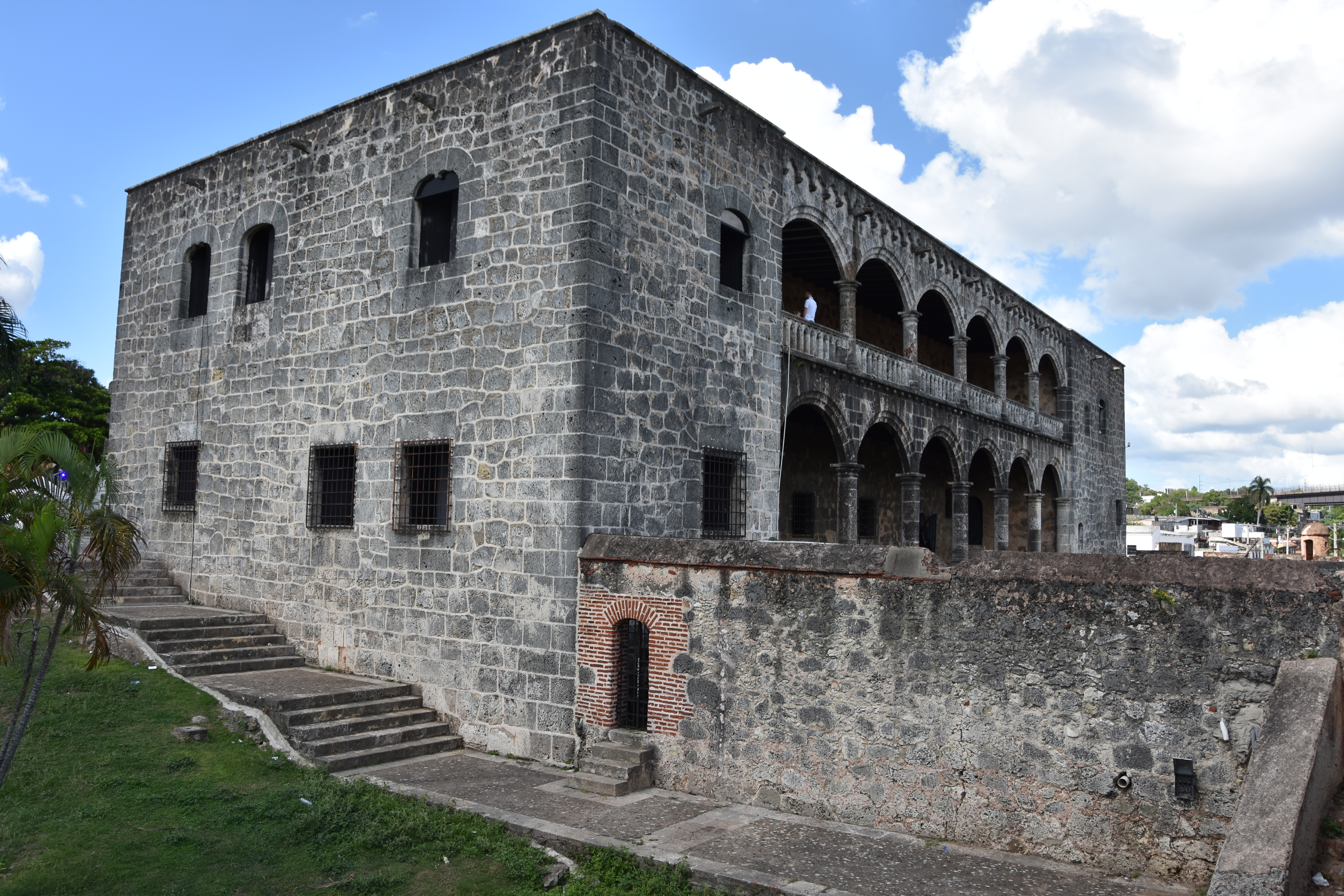
- Front and rear façades of Alcázar de Colón

- Location within the Dominican Republic
- Location: Santo Domingo, Dominican Republic
- Part of: Colonial City of Santo Domingo
- Criteria: Cultural: (ii), (iv), (vi)
- Reference: 526
- Inscription: 1990 (14th Session)
- Coordinates: 18°28′39″N 69°52′58″W

The Alcázar de Colón (Spanish pronunciation: [alˈkasaɾ ðe koˈlon]; lit. 'Columbus Alcazar') is the first fortified European palace built in the Americas. Located in the colonial area of Santo Domingo, Dominican Republic, it forms part of the Ciudad Colonial, a UNESCO World Heritage Site. Predominantly Gothic with Renaissance influences, the palace was constructed between 1511 and 1514, but fell into ruin by the mid-18th century. It remained abandoned until 1957, when it was restored into a museum.

It is the only known residence of a member of the Christopher Columbus family in the New World. The palace was inhabited by Columbus's first-born son, Diego Columbus, whose children Juana, Isabel, Luis, and Christopher were born there. Diego Columbus died in Spain in 1526, but his widow, María Álvarez de Toledo, remained at the palace until her death in 1549. Three generations of the Columbus family inhabited the residence, possibly until the late 16th century.

The palace's Tapestry collection, spanning from the 15th to 17th centuries, is particularly significant and unique in the Caribbean, featuring pieces produced by the Flemish Van Den Hecke family from cartouches created by Charles Le Brun. The Alcázar is the most visited museum in Santo Domingo.

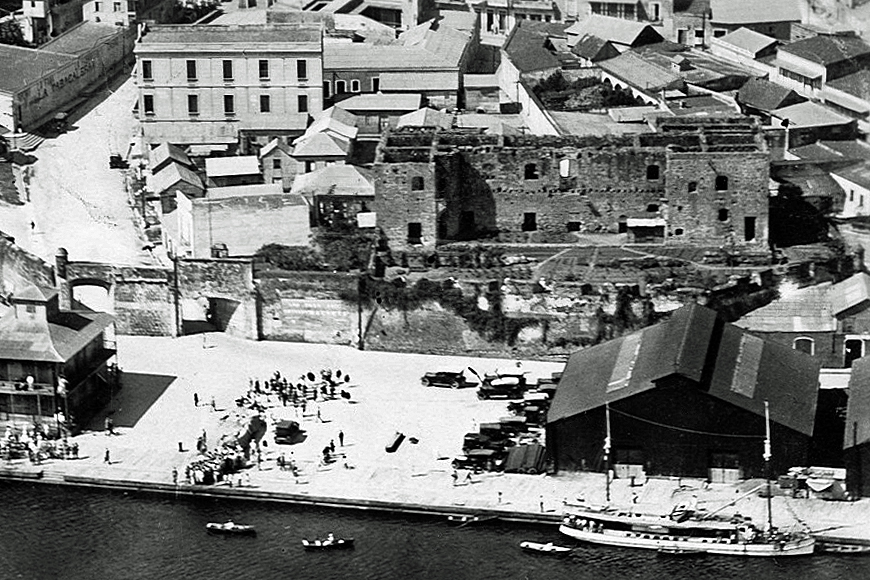
Alcázar de Colón (center-right) in ruins, 1922

== History ==
The Alcázar de Colón was built between 1511 and 1514. In 1509, Columbus himself became governor and viceroy of the colony. The palace was constructed following the design of an existing structure in Mancera de Abajo, in Salamanca, Spain, of which ruins are still preserved. The name of the architect responsible for the construction of this fortified palace is unknown. While primarily Gothic in style, it also features some Renaissance elements, particularly in its arcades.

Some of the most famous Spanish conquistadors, such as Hernán Cortés and Pedro de Alvarado, visited the residence. During the early Spanish colonial period, the mansion played a significant role in history, serving as the base for planning many expeditions of conquest and exploration. In 1586, the palace was captured and looted by the British pirate Sir Francis Drake and his forces, who took many valuables. The ownership of the palace was the subject of litigation for nearly two centuries from that year.

It is the only known residence of a Columbus family member, apart from Christopher's birthplace in Genoa and Ferdinand Columbus's Casa de Colón in Seville. Juana, Isabel, Luis, and Cristóbal Columbus de Toledo, children of Don Diego Columbus and his wife Doña María Álvarez de Toledo, were born in the palace. Diego Columbus died in Spain in 1526, but María Álvarez de Toledo, his widow, remained there until her death in 1549. Three generations of the Columbus de Toledo family lived there, possibly until 1577.

As the influence of the Captaincy General of Santo Domingo declined, the house deteriorated, and by the mid-18th century, it was abandoned and at risk of decay. Originally, the residence had 55 rooms, of which only 22 remain. By 1776, the building had fallen into disrepair and was nearly converted into a prison, a project that was never realized.

Almost a century later, in 1870, it was declared a National Monument, and the Dominican government eventually restored the palace. Restoration took place between 1955 and 1957, transforming it into a museum with 22 rooms filled with period furniture, artwork, and other accessories. A self-guided tour using a portable audio speaker that discusses each room's function is available in various languages.

== Architecture ==
The building was constructed using masonry made of coral rock. It was built on a plot close to the rock islet overlooking the Ozama River, granted to Diego Columbus, the firstborn son of Christopher Columbus, by King Ferdinand II of Aragon, to build a dwelling for him and his descendants on the island of Hispaniola. Diego Columbus arrived in 1509 as governor. The building now houses the Museo Alcázar de Diego Colón, which exhibits the Caribbean's most important collection of European late medieval and Renaissance art, acquired in the 1950s.

The palace is a large structure built from coralline blocks that once housed some fifty rooms, along with gardens and courtyards. What remains today is about half the size it once was. It was built under Diego Colón, the son of Christopher Columbus, who ordered its construction as a family home and governor's mansion between 1510 and 1512, when he became the 4th Governor of the Indies. The architectural style is Gothic, typical of the early 16th century.

The palace was built largely from coral stone and combines Renaissance, Gothic and Mudéjar elements.

The palace was built largely from coral stone and combines Renaissance, Gothic and Mudéjar elements.

== Gallery ==
=== Exterior ===
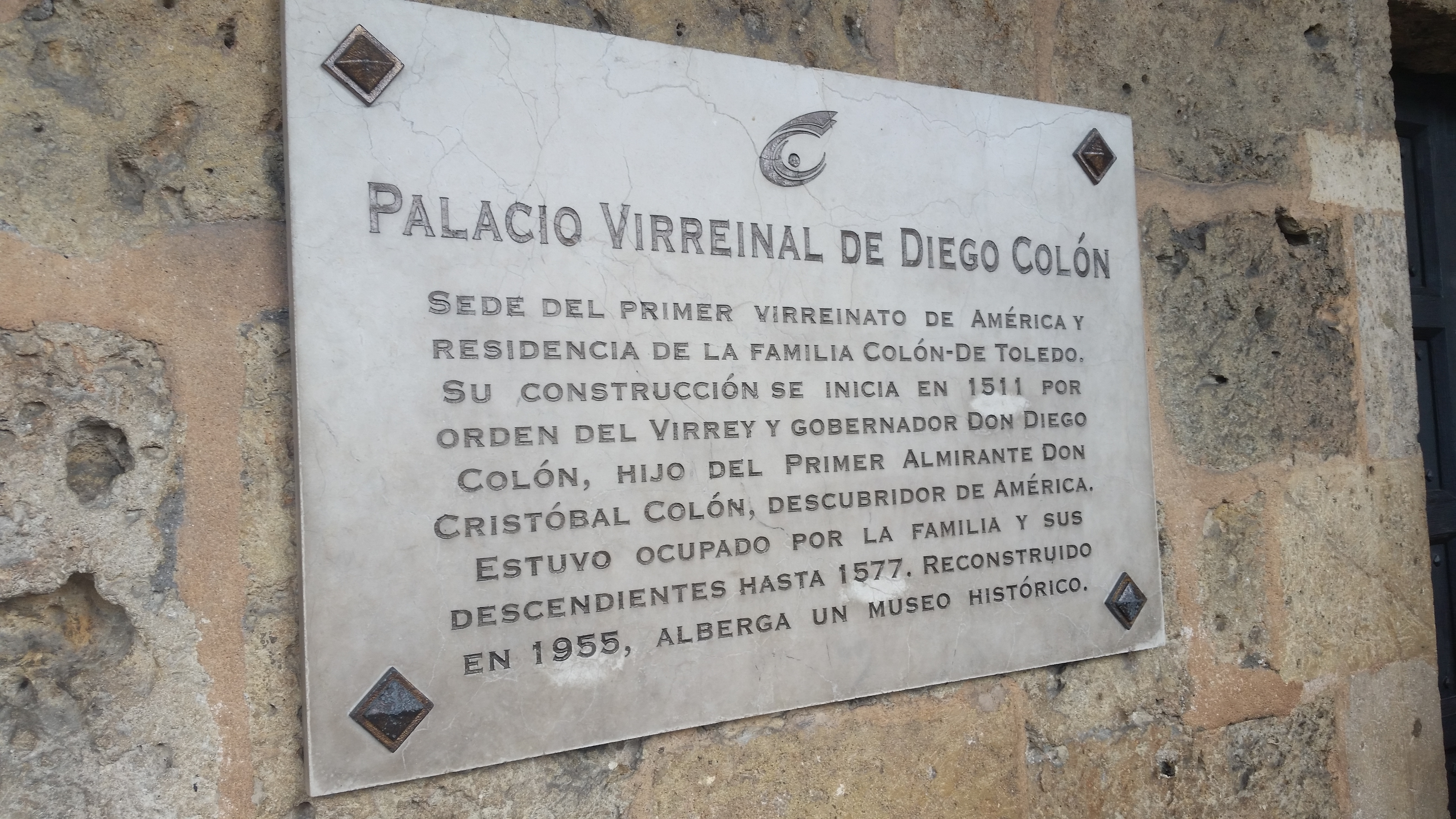
Alcazar de Colon historical marker

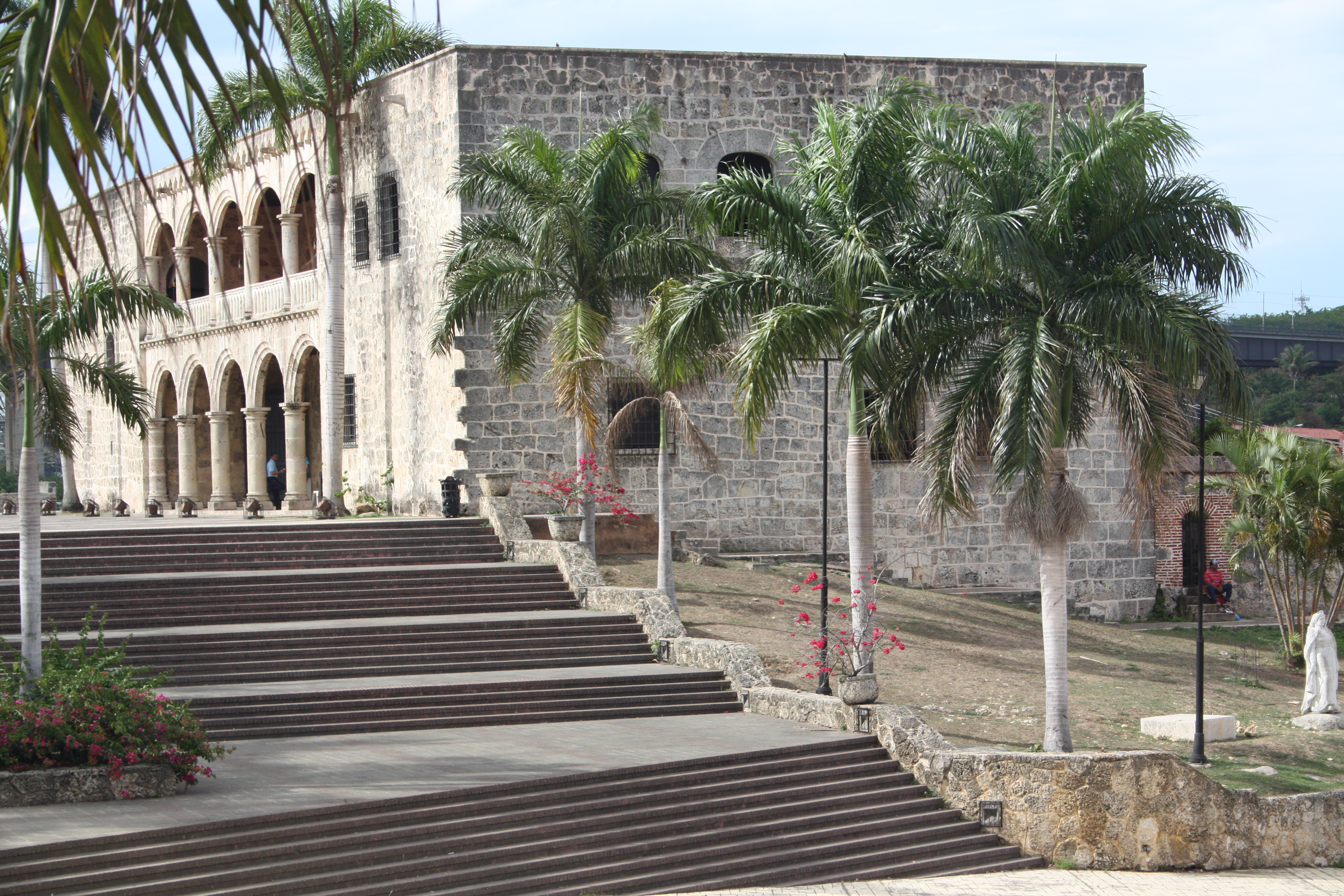

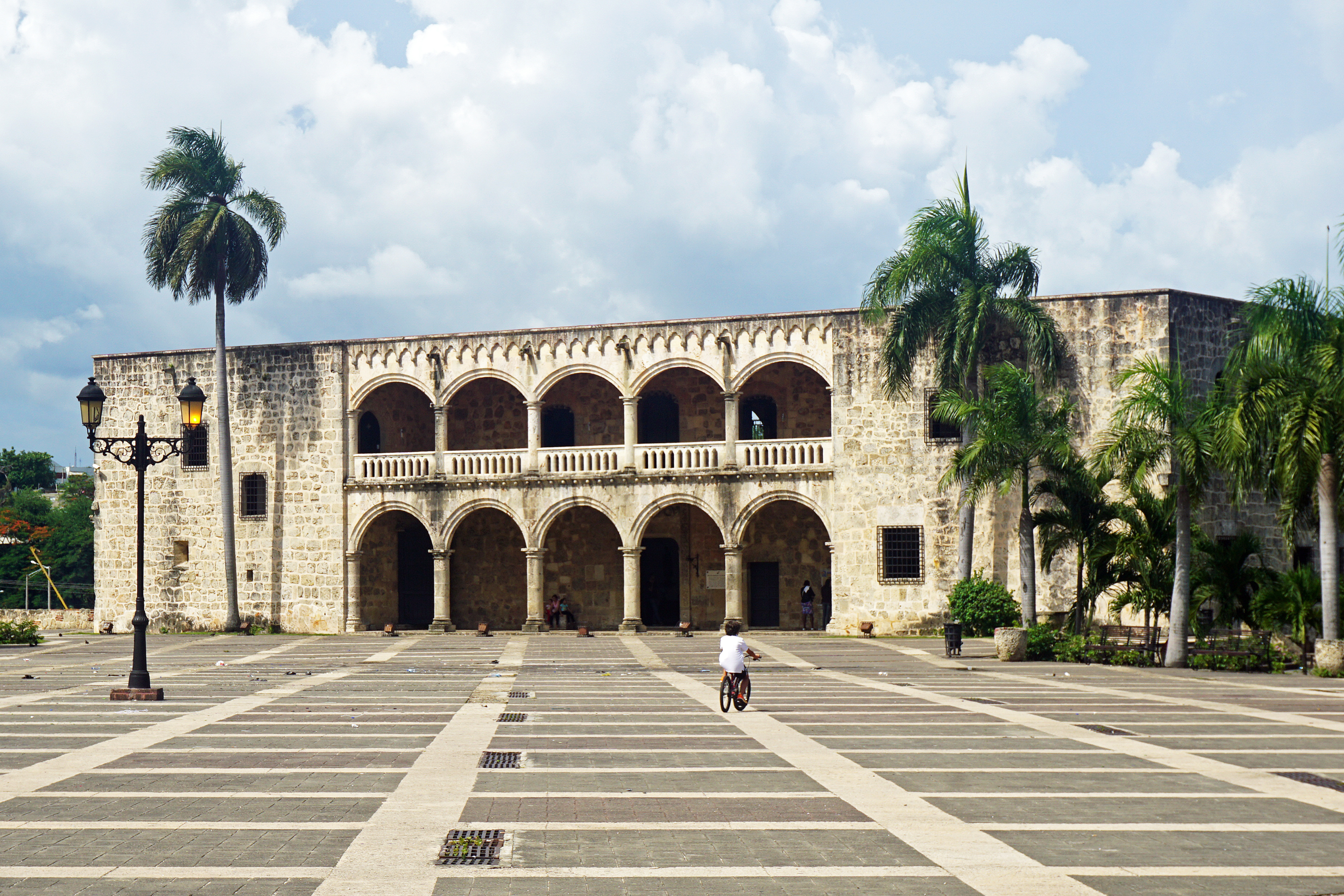

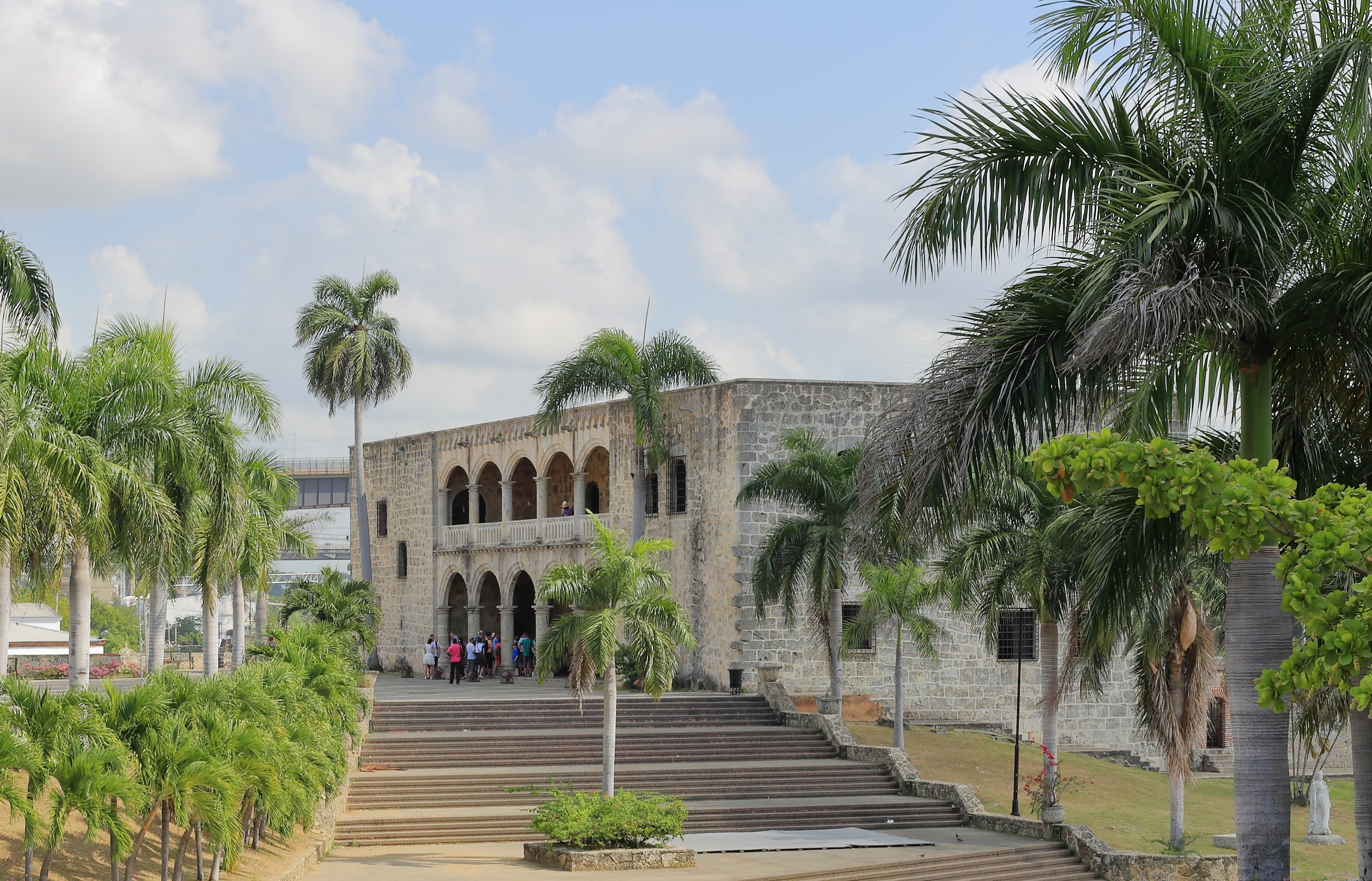
As seen from the south

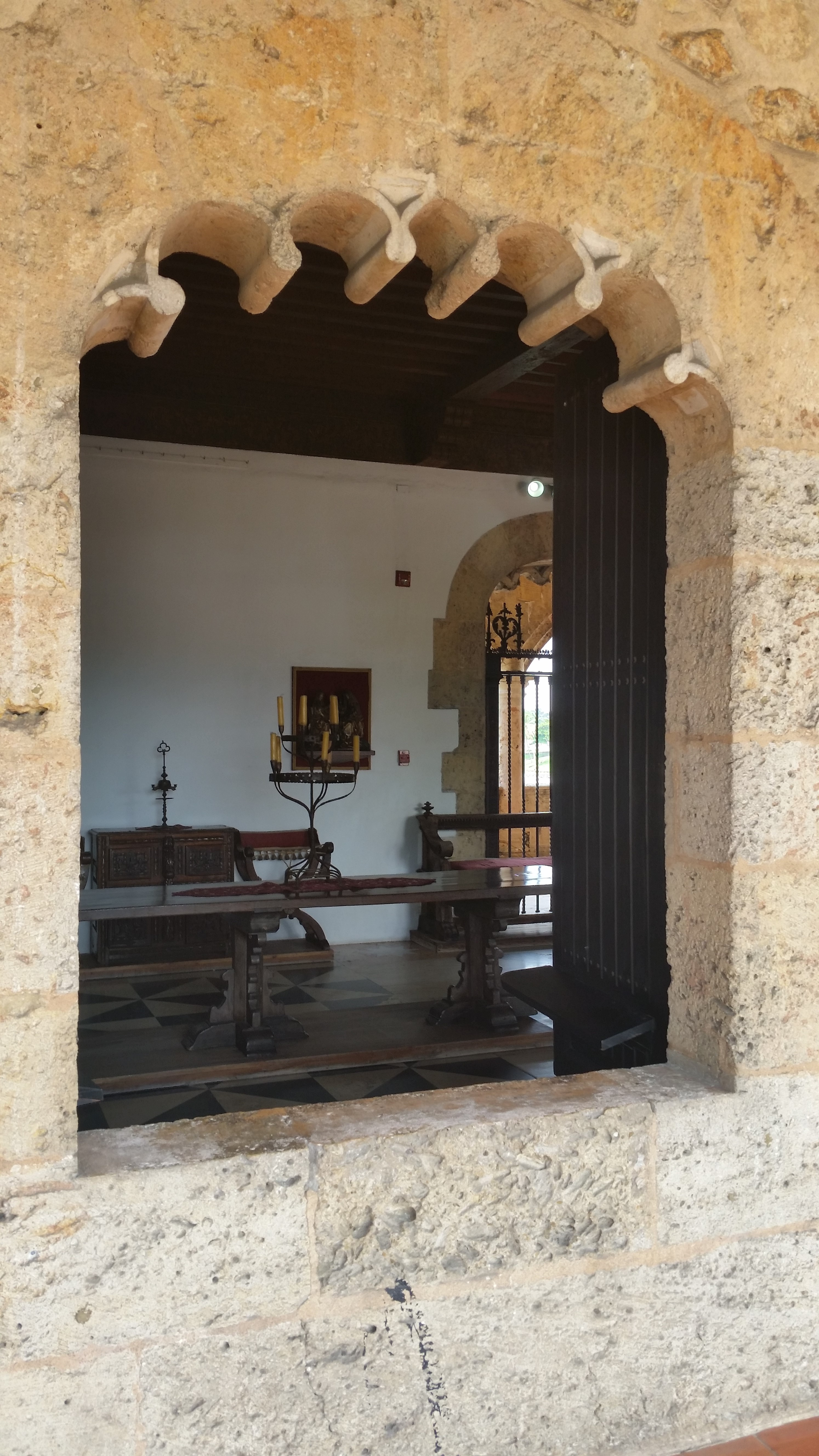
Alcazar de Colon window

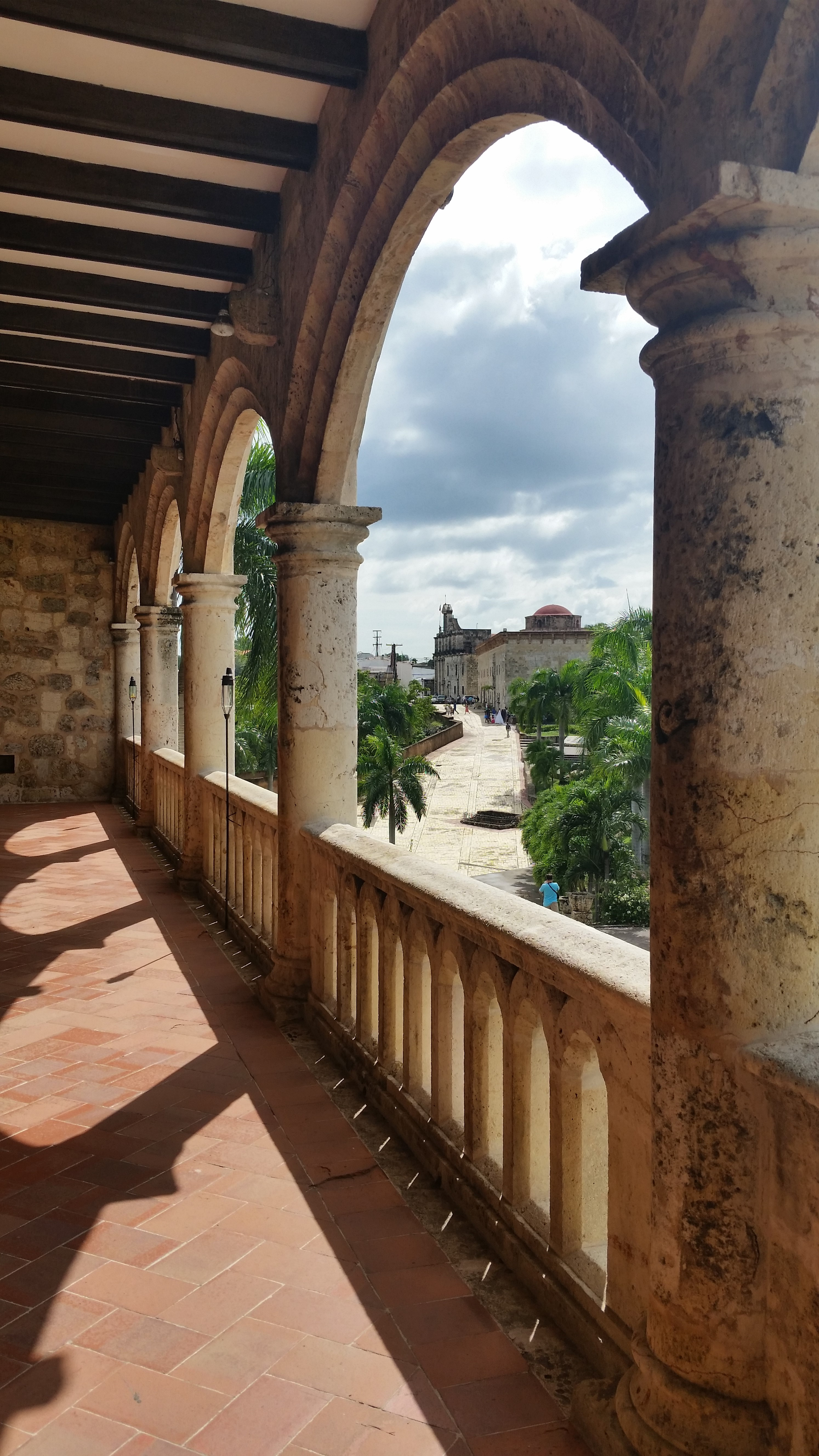
Alcazar de Colon balcony

=== Interior ===
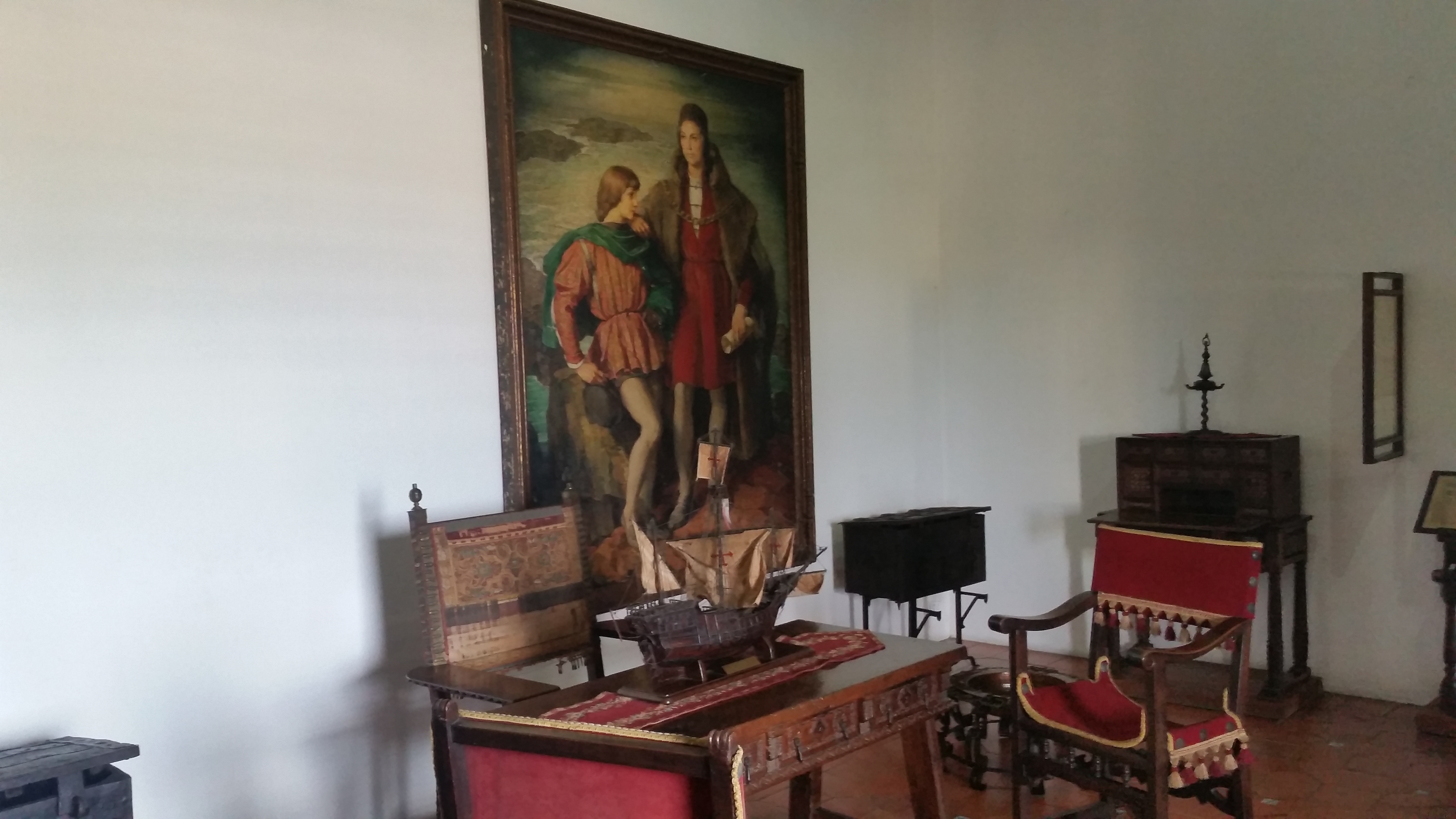
Alcazar de Colon interior

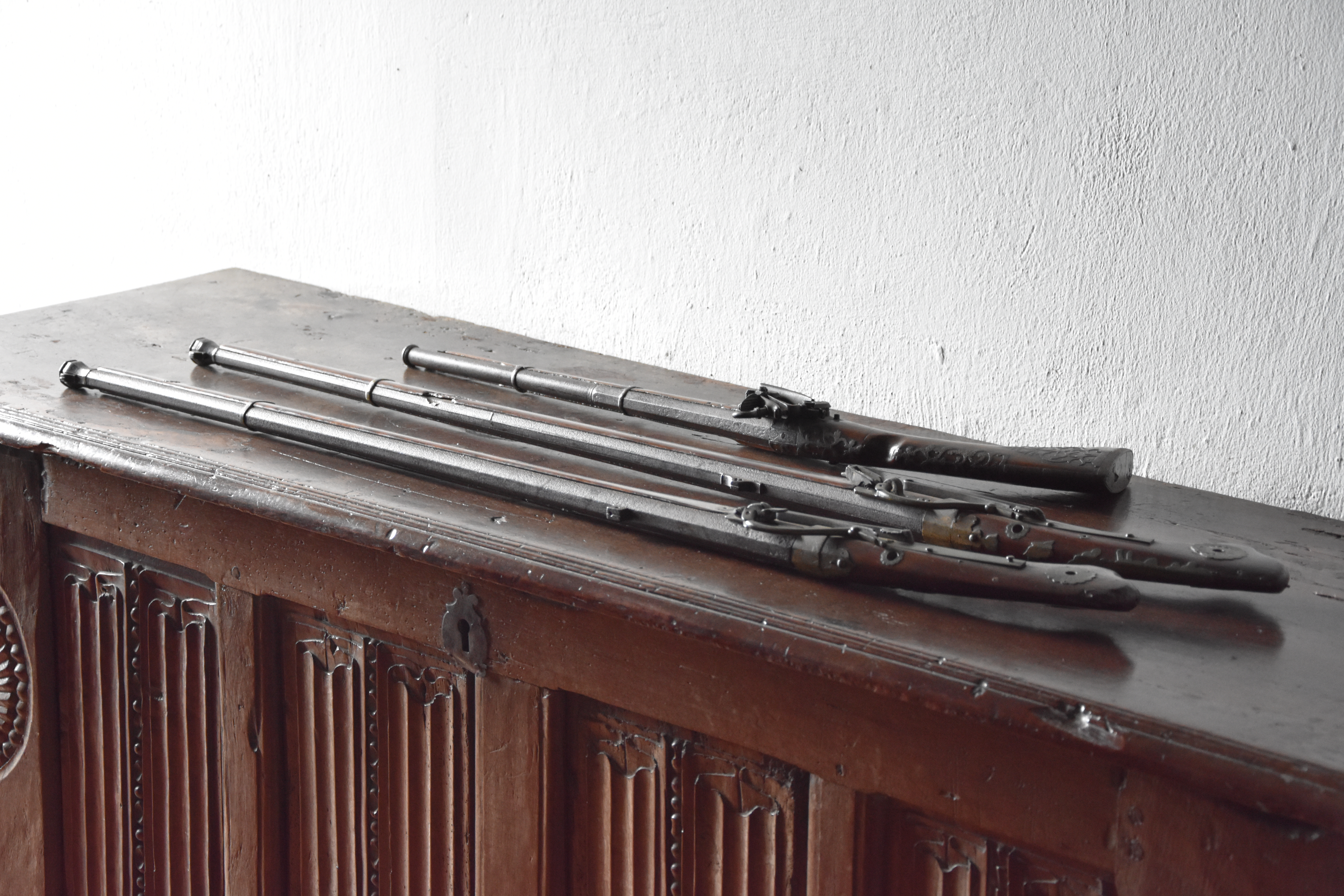

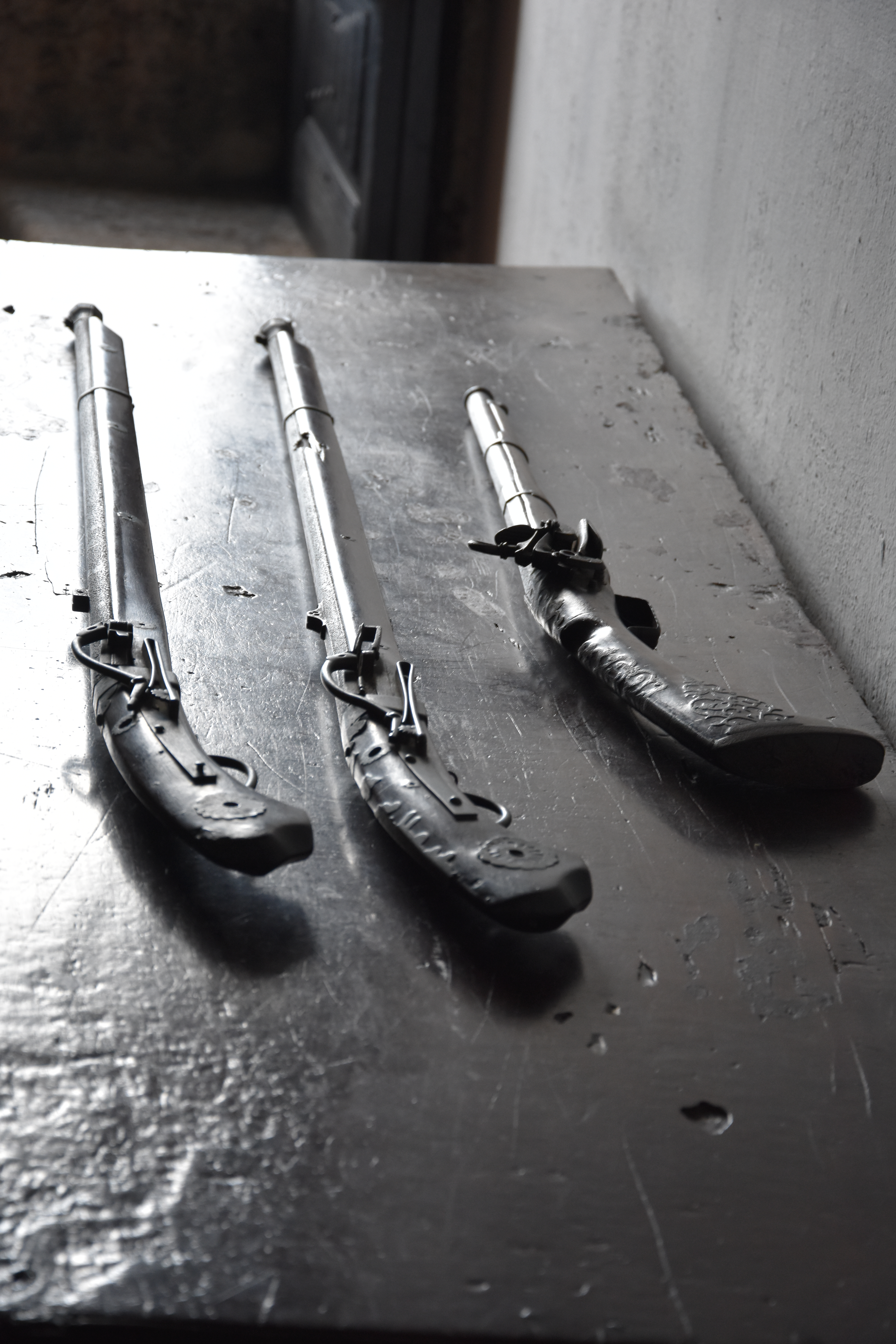

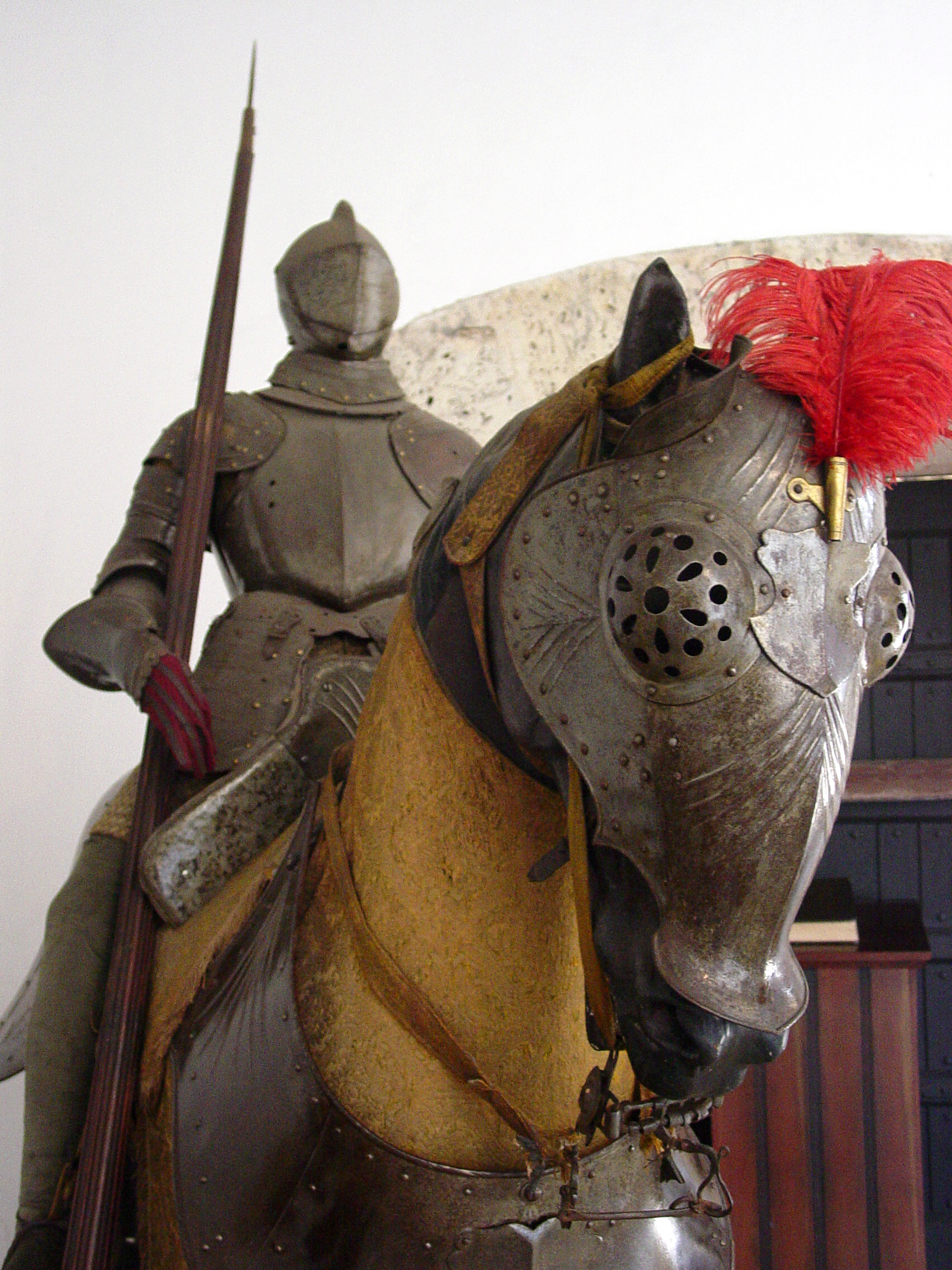

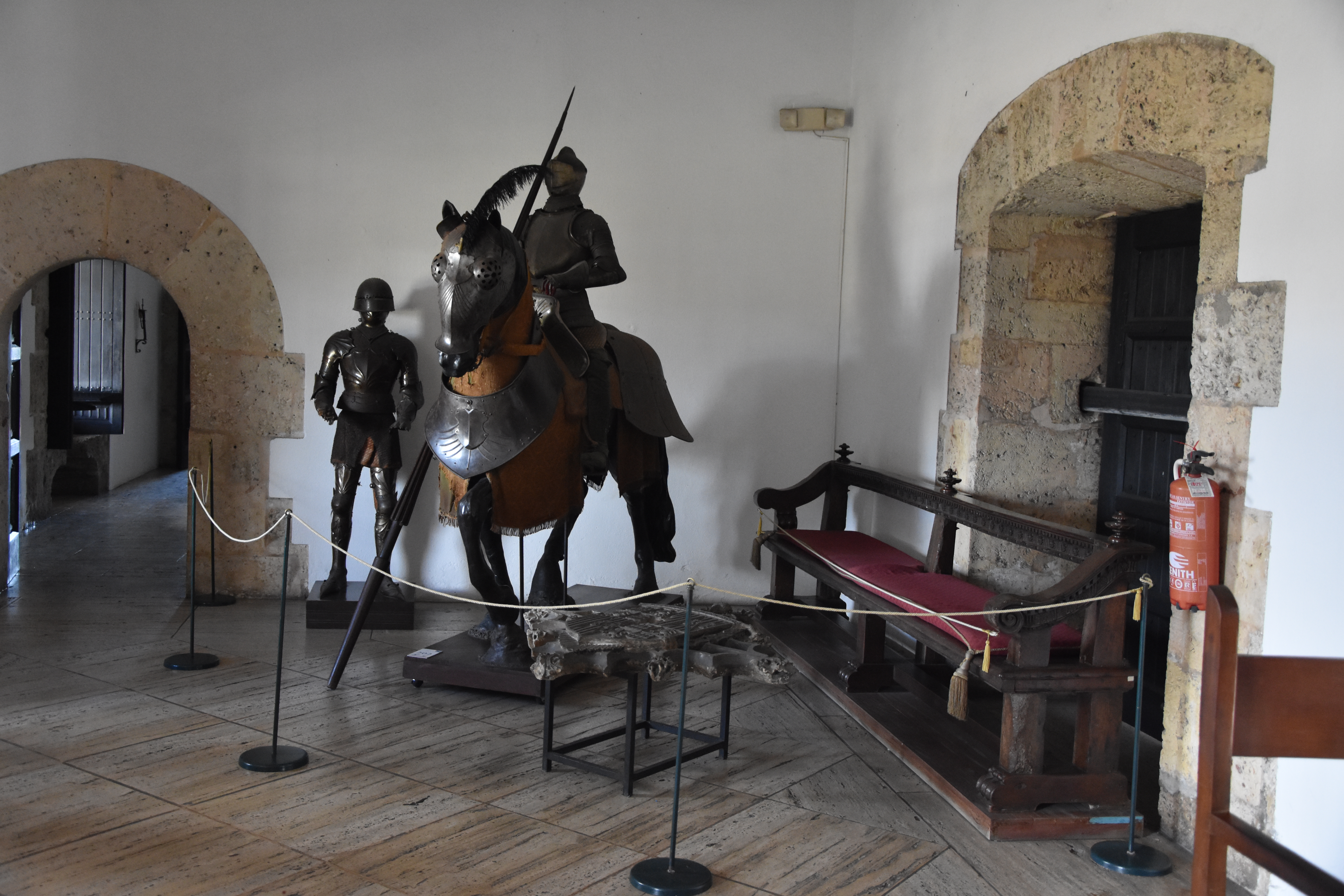

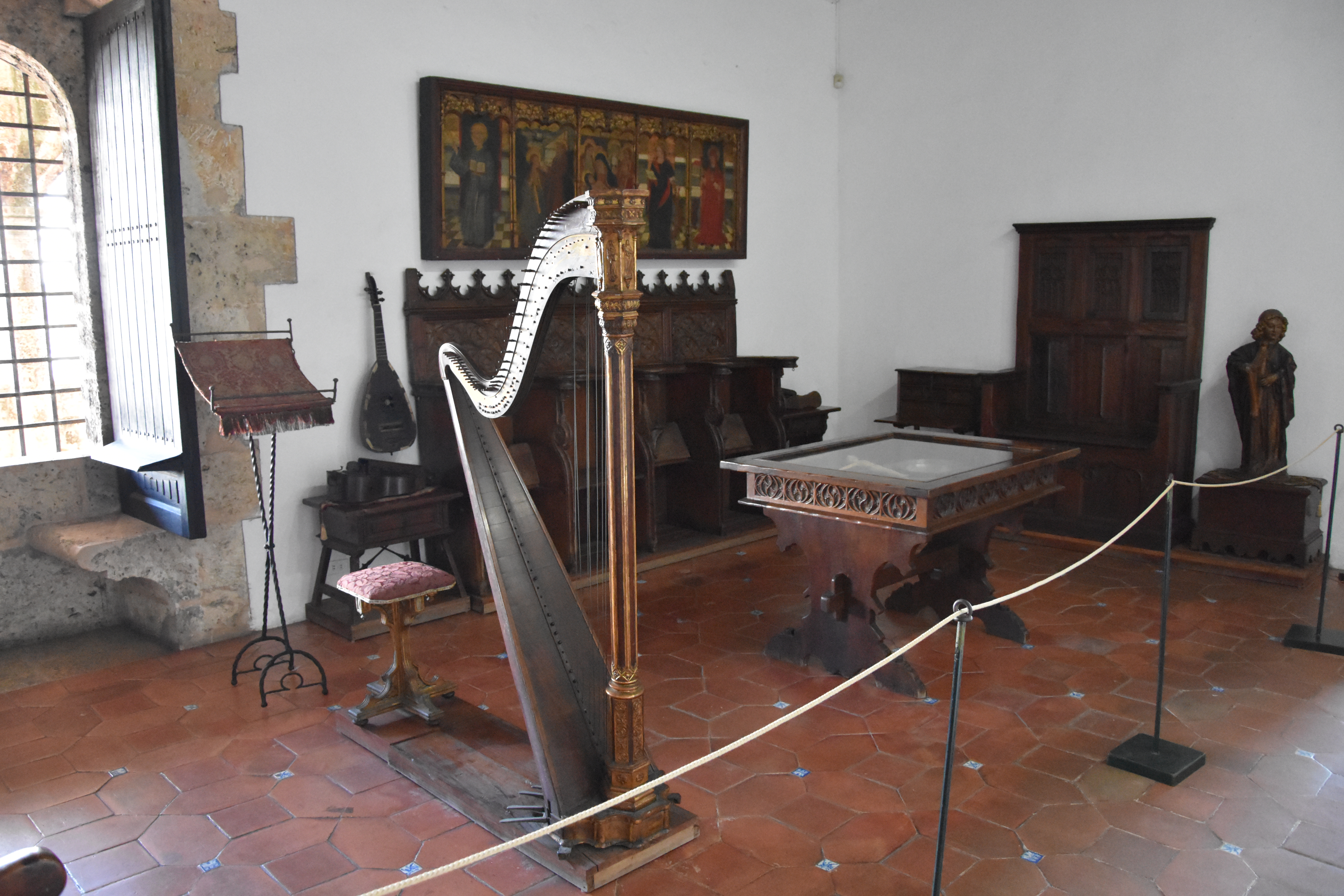

== See also ==
- List of colonial buildings in Santo Domingo
- Captaincy General of Santo Domingo
- Ciudad Colonial (Santo Domingo)
- History of the Dominican Republic
