= Royal Veragua =

Royal Veragua (Spanish: Veragua Real) was a Central American territory of the Crown of Castile established in 1537. It encompassed the western part of the former Gobernación de Veragua (1508–1537), from the Caribbean slopes from the Río Sixaola (the present boundary with Costa Rica) to the island Escudo de Veraguas, in what is now Panama. The eastern part was named the Duchy of Veragua and controlled by the heirs of Christopher Columbus. Royal Veragua lasted for only three years before being incorporated into the new Province of Nuevo Cartago y Costa Rica in November 1540, while the Duchy was sold back by Columbus' heirs in 1556 to the Crown and became Veraguas Province in 1560.

== History ==
Both territories had earlier formed part of the Gobernación de Veragua, also known as Veragua colombina (Columbian Veragua). In 1537, at the conclusion of the long-running lawsuits between Columbus and his heirs and the Crown of Castille, the Duchy of Veragua was created, with Columbus's grandson Admiral Luis Colón as the first Duke. The remaining territory of the Gobernación—which had also been claimed by Columbus' heirs—, extending along the Caribbean coast from Escudo de Veraguas to Cabo Gracias a Dios, remained under royal jurisdiction and was renamed Royal Veragua. It began to be populated in 1540 under the direction of its first and only Governor, Hernán Sánchez de Badajoz. He founded the town of Badajoz in April 1540, and named it after his hometown of Badajoz, Spain. Both Badajoz and Royal Veragua had an ephemeral existence. In 1540, it was combined with other territories on the Pacific slope belonging to Castilla de Oro to create the Province of Nuevo Cartago y Costa Rica.
