= Diego Gutiérrez y Toledo =

Spanish colonial administrator (1510–1544)

Alcalde mayor of Nuevo Cartago y Costa Rica
- In office 29 November 1540 – December 1544
- Monarch: Charles I
- Preceded by: Hernán Sánchez de Badajoz
- Succeeded by: Juan de Cavallón y Arboleda

Personal details
- Born: Diego Gutiérrez y Toledo; 1510 Madrid, Crown of Castile
- Died: 1544 (aged 33–34) Tayutic, Nuevo Cartago y Costa Rica

Diego Gutiérrez y Toledo (c. 1510 – December 1544) was a Spanish colonial administrator and conquistador who served as the first governor of the Province of Nuevo Cartago y Costa Rica, a Spanish territorial jurisdiction established by the Crown of Castile within the Viceroyalty of New Spain. Appointed by King Charles I in 1540, he led the first sustained attempt to establish Spanish rule over the Caribbean region of present-day Costa Rica. His expedition ended in failure when he and most of his companions were killed by indigenous inhabitants in 1544.

Nominally, Gutiérrez y Toledo was named the first governor of Nueva Cartago and Costa Rica, but upon arriving in the territory he administered it as alcalde mayor from that date until his death at the end of 1544, due to the suppression of the governorship by the Royal Audiencia of Guatemala, from November 1542 to 1568.

== Biography ==
Gutiérrez y Toledo was born in Madrid, Crown of Castile, around 1510. He was the son of Alonso Gutiérrez de Madrid, royal treasurer of Castile, and María Rodríguez de Pisa, both members of converso families of Jewish origin. His brother, Felipe Gutiérrez y Toledo (1500–1544), served as governor of Veragua.

The first official reference to a Province of Costa Rica dates to 1539, when the Royal Audiencia of Panama appointed Hernán Sánchez de Badajoz as governor and adelantado of Costa Rica. The Spanish Crown subsequently annulled both the appointment and the jurisdiction. On 29 November 1540, Charles I issued a Real Cédula creating the Governorship of Nuevo Cartago y Costa Rica and appointing Diego Gutiérrez y Toledo as its governor and captain-general. The new jurisdiction comprised the former royal territories of Veragua that remained under direct Crown authority after the creation of the Duchy of Veragua, together with adjacent territories on the Pacific slope that had previously belonged to Castilla de Oro. Although the royal decree referred to the jurisdiction as the Governorship of Cartago, Gutiérrez consistently used the designation Cartago y Costa Rica, a name that was subsequently adopted in official usage.

Although appointed in 1540, Gutiérrez did not assume office until late 1543 because of delays in organizing and financing the expedition. By then, the administrative reforms introduced by the New Laws of 1542 had placed the province under the jurisdiction of the newly established Audiencia de los Confines, headquartered in Guatemala.

On 22 November 1543, Gutiérrez founded the settlement of Santiago on the Caribbean coast of present-day Costa Rica, on the banks of the Reventazón River. Less than a year later, on 4 October 1544, he abandoned Santiago and established the settlement of San Francisco, where Gutiérrez detained several indigenous leaders in an attempt to obtain ransom. After one chief escaped and another declared that he possessed no valuables, Gutiérrez subjected the latter to forced servitude. The incident provoked a coordinated indigenous attack that destroyed the settlement. Gutiérrez and the surviving colonists fled into the interior, where they were killed by indigenous warriors in December 1544, bringing the expedition to an end.
