= Rodrigo de Triana =

Spanish explorer (born 1469)

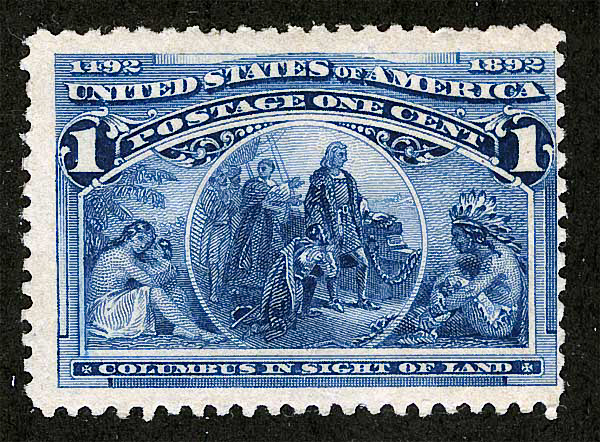
"Columbus in Sight of Land", depicted in the 1¢ Columbian postage stamp

Rodrigo de Triana (1469 in Lepe, Huelva, Spain – 1535 in Maluku Islands) was a Spanish sailor, believed to be the first European from the Age of Exploration to have seen the Americas. Born as Juan Rodríguez Bermejo, Triana was the son of hidalgo and potter Vicente Bermejo and Sereni Betancour. Triana was a Marrano.

On October 12, 1492, while on Christopher Columbus' ship La Pinta, he sighted a land that was called Guanahani by the natives."Esta tierra vidó primero un marinero que se decía Rodrigo de Triana, puesto que el Almirante a las diez de la noche, estando en el castillo de popa, vidó lumbre aunque fue cosa tan cerrada que no quiso afirmar que fuese tierra." — The Diary of Christopher Columbus After spotting the Bahamian island at approximately two o'clock in the morning, he is reported to have shouted "¡Tierra! ¡Tierra!" (Land! Land!). Columbus claims in his journal that he saw a light "like a little wax candle rising and falling" four hours earlier, "but it was so indistinct that he did not dare to affirm it was land." Rodrigo had spotted a small island in the Lucayas archipelago (known today as the Bahamas), in the Caribbean Sea. The island was named by Christopher Columbus as San Salvador, in honour of Jesus Christ and the salvation that finding land implied after that long journey.

Columbus found questionable witnesses to support his claim and reward for being the first to see America. Triana was disgusted by that dishonesty. After his return to Spain, Triana sailed to Africa.

Triana was a Catholic.

NASA's Deep Space Climate Observatory, a satellite originally intended to provide a near-continuous view of the entire Earth, was initially named Triana, after Rodrigo de Triana.

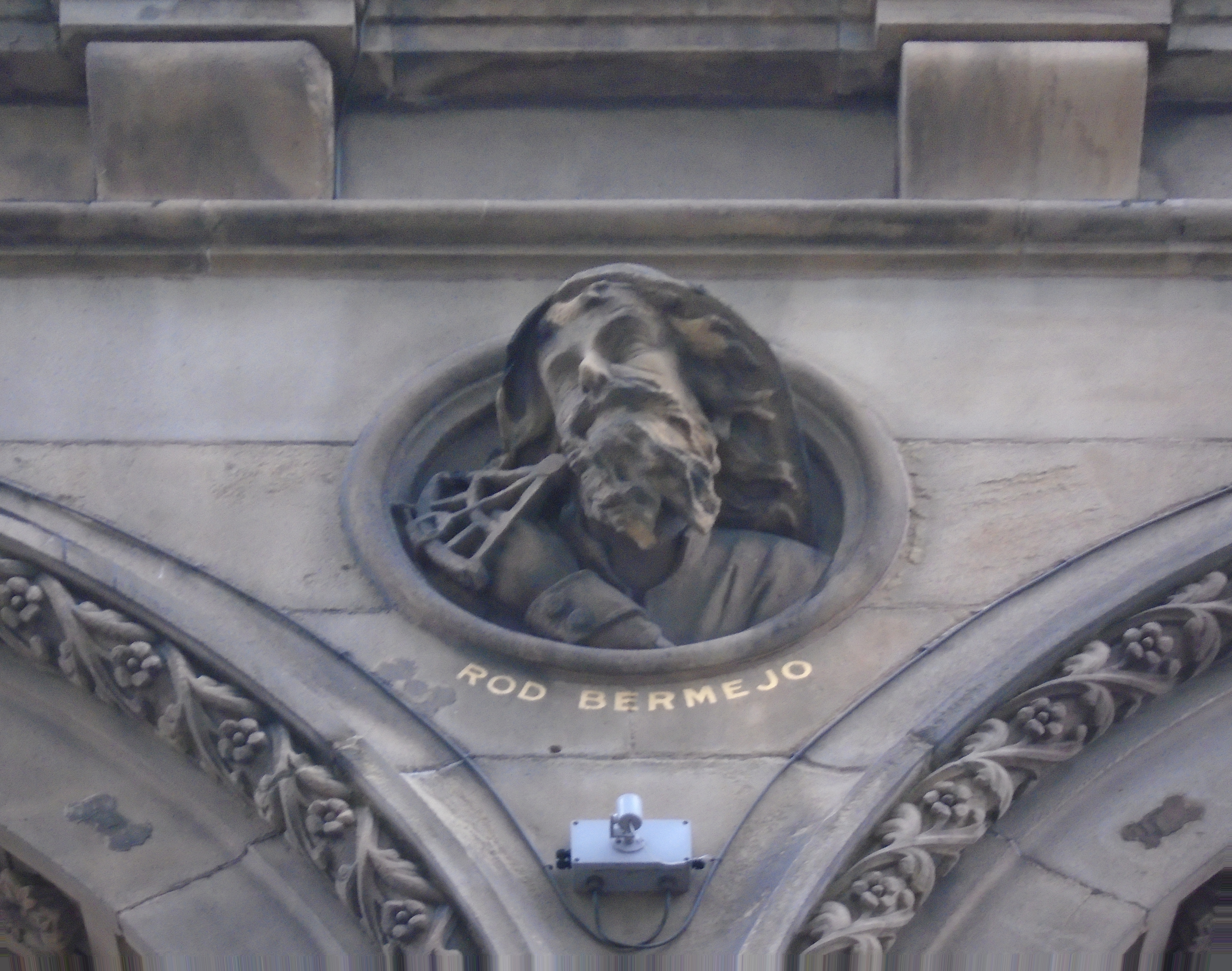
Relief of de Triana on the front of the Hargreaves Building, Liverpool
