= Nuevo Cartago y Costa Rica Province =

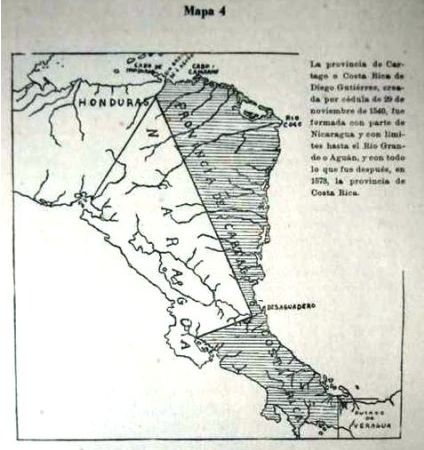
New Cartago or Costa Rica

Nuevo Cartago y Costa Rica was a province of the Kingdom of Guatemala, created in 1540 during the reign of Charles V, Holy Roman Emperor (King Charles I of Spain). It was formed from two earlier Spanish territories. The first of these was Royal Veragua, the territories on the Caribbean coast that had been part of Columbian Veragua before the creation of the Duchy of Veragua in 1537 for Admiral Luis Colón y Toledo, namely present-day Nicaragua, Costa Rica and part of Panama. The second was the Pacific coast that had constituted Castilla de Oro, namely from the Gulf of Nicoya on the west to the borders of the Duchy of Veragua.

Under a new decree on November 29, 1540, the King appointed Diego Gutiérrez y Toledo as governor and captain to explore and populate the portion of Veragua that lay outside the Duchy. By this time, the entity known as Veragua Real had officially ceased to exist as an administrative division due to the creation of the Duchy of Veragua. As a result, the vast Veragua was divided into two parts: the Duchy of Veragua and another region that was unified with territories on the Pacific slope previously belonging to Castilla de Oro. This territory was renamed the Gobernación de Cartago by the King. He arrived in the territory in 1543 and founded the town of Santiago and the city of San Francisco. He was killed by the indigenous inhabitants in 1544.

In 1549 Juan Pérez de Cabrera was named to succeed Gutiérrez y Toledo, but the Crown revoked the nomination. In 1561 Juan de Cavallón y Arboleda was named alcalde mayor of the province. His assistant, Fray Juan de Estrade Rávago y Añez succeeded him in 1562. In the same year, Juan Vázquez de Coronado was named the new alcalde mayor.

In 1565 the territory became Costa Rica Province.
