= Veragua =

Spanish colonial territories

The name Veragua or Veraguas was used for five Spanish colonial territorial entities in Central America, beginning in the 16th century during the Spanish colonization of the Americas.

The term comes from the name given to the region by Central American indigenous peoples and was used to designate colonial territories in what is now Costa Rica, Nicaragua, and Panama.

Originally, the name was written without an "s" (Veragua). However, the form Veraguas began to be officially used following two royal documents: the Royal Decree of August 20, 1739, and the Royal Mandate of June 20, 1751.

== Indigenous people of Veragua ==
Chronicles narrate stories of the indigenous groups encountered by the explorers, as they did not come across a solitary territory. On the contrary, these ethnicities posed challenges for the conquistadors because many of these groups were strong and resilient, as in the case of the Doraces, also known as Dorás, Dorces, Dorados, or Dorasques.

The Doraces, also known as dorados, dorás, dorasques or dorces, were not a single homogeneous ethnic group. Rather, they represented a small nation that included multiple ethnicities, languages and allied tribes. Among these were the Aburema, Aoyaques, Barú, Borasi, Boquerón, Bugabas, Bulabá, Buricas, Caizanes, Calderas, Carabaro, Cébaco, Chalivas, Chiracona, Chiriluos, Chumulos, Dolegas, Duraria, dures, dururua, espalaba, guabalá, gualaca, guaniaga, iribolos, mariato, montijo, musá, nusa, saribas, querébalos, raquegua, suasimis, suríes, tabasará, tabor, vareclas, veragua, among others.

== Territorial entities ==
The Spanish colonial territorial entities with the name Veragua include:

=== Governorate of Veragua — 1502–1537 ===
- The Governorate of Veragua (Gobernación de Veragua) (1502–1537) included the Caribbean coast of present-day Nicaragua (Mosquito Coast) and Costa Rica and the coast of Panama as far as the Río Belén, namely, the coastline explored by Christopher Columbus on his fourth voyage, in 1502. It was this area that Columbus (and his heirs) claimed as his private domain, but which the Crown did not recognize. Spanish governors of this territory were Diego de Nicuesa and Felipe Gutiérrez y Toledo.

=== Duchy of Veragua — 1537–1560 ===
- The Duchy of Veragua, created in 1537 from the Gobernación de Veragua in territory now belonging to Panama. The first duke was Luis Colón y Toledo, grandson and heir of Columbus, who received the title after a long lawsuit with the Crown of Castile. In 1556 he returned the territory to the Crown but retained the ducal title.

=== Royal Veragua — 1537–1540 ===
- Royal Veragua (Veragua Real) (1537–1540) included those territories of the Governorate of Veragua not included in the Duchy of Veragua. These territories were in two parts, with the duchy separating them. In 1540 the western part, together with territories from Castilla de Oro, became the Province of Nuevo Cartago y Costa Rica within the Spanish Captaincy General of Guatemala (Kingdom of Guatemala).

=== Province of Veragua — 1560–1821 ===
- The Province of Veragua, formed in 1560 from territories formerly in the Duchy of Veragua. Its first governor was Francisco Vázquez. This territory, slightly expanded to the west and the south, became a dependency of the Intendencia of Panama, and in 1821, of the Republic of Colombia.

=== Province of Veragua — 1821–1903 ===
- In the year 1849, on May 26, the Senate and House of Representatives of New Granada, convened in Congress, issued a decree to divide the Province of Veraguas into two provinces. The first province would be composed of the canton of Santiago and would be named the Province of Veraguas, with its capital in the city of Santiago. The second province, composed of the canton of Alanje, would be named Chiriquí, with its capital in the town of David.

== Present day ==
=== Veraguas Province ===
- Veraguas Province is a present-day Province of the Republic of Panama.

== See also ==
- Indigenous peoples of Costa Rica
- Indigenous peoples of Panama
- Subdivisions of the Spanish Empire
