= Pleitos colombinos =

Lawsuits of heirs of Christopher Columbus against Spain

The Pleitos colombinos ("Columbian lawsuits") were a long series of lawsuits that the heirs of Christopher Columbus brought against the Crown of Castile and León in defense of the privileges obtained by Columbus for his discoveries in the New World. Most of the lawsuits took place between 1508 and 1536.

== Background ==
The Capitulations of Santa Fe, between Christopher Columbus and the Catholic Monarchs Queen Isabella I of Castile and King Ferdinand II of Aragon, signed in Santa Fe, Granada on April 17, 1492, granted Columbus, among other things, the tenth part of all riches to be obtained from his intended voyage. Although not a formal agreement, the capitulations resulted from negotiation.

During Columbus's third voyage, he encountered hostility from other Spaniards in Hispaniola, who felt deceived by Columbus's promises of riches. On several occasions, Columbus attempted to ally with the rebellious Taínos and Caribs against other Spaniards. Others, returning separately from America, accused him before the royal court of poor governance. The king and queen sent royal administrator Francisco de Bobadilla to Hispaniola in 1500, and upon his arrival (23 August), Columbus and his brothers were arrested and sent back to Spain in chains. Upon arriving in Spain, he regained his liberty but lost a great deal of his prestige and power.

Upon Columbus's death in 1506, he was succeeded as Admiral of the Indies by his oldest son, Diego. In 1508, King Ferdinand in his capacity as regent of Castile, gave Diego Colón the additional office of Governor of the Indies "for the time my grace and will would have it" (el tiempo que mi merced e voluntad fuere). Diego Colón held that it was "in perpetuity" and initiated a lawsuit against the Crown.

== Lawsuit ==
In 1511 the first verdict was given, in Seville. The judges recognized for the line of Columbus the position of viceroys in perpetuity and the right to a tenth of the benefits obtained from the Indies. The Crown received, among other things, the right to name appellate judges. Neither party was satisfied, and both sides appealed.

In 1512, the suit was combined with the pleito del Darién, a suit over whether the jurisdiction of Columbus's heirs extended to the mainland of America (the tierra firme). The name Darién, still used for the Darién Gap in Panama near Colombia, then referred to a far larger and somewhat indefinite region extending further into Central America.

In 1520 was a new verdict, known as the "Declaration of La Coruña" (after the Galician city, now A Coruña).

In 1524, Diego Colón was deposed from his position as governor and instituted a new suit against the Crown. He died two years later, but his widow continued the suit in the name of their son, Luis, a minor at the time. The primary representative of the family at this time, if not the one with the standing for the suit, was Diego's brother, Fernando Colón. A verdict in Valladolid on 25 June 1527 declared the previous verdicts annulled and ordered a new trial.

The new royal prosecutor attempted to demonstrate that the discovery of the West Indies had principally been achieved thanks to Martín Alonso Pinzón, not Columbus. He called as witnesses surviving members of the crew of the first voyage to America. Two verdicts were given: in Dueñas (1534) and in Madrid (1535), but both were appealed.

== Arbitration ==
Both parties finally submitted to arbitration. On 28 June 1536 the president of the Council of the Indies, Bishop García de Loaysa, and the president of the Council of Castile, Gaspar de Montoya, delivered the following arbitration award:

- They confirmed the title of Admiral of the Indies in perpetuity to the line of Columbus, with privileges analogous to those of the Admiral of Castile.
- They removed the titles of Viceroy and Governor General of the Indies.
- They established a seigneury for Columbus's heirs consisting mainly of the island of Jamaica (with the title of Marquess of Jamaica), a territory of 25 leagues square in Veragua (with the title of Duke of Veragua).
- They confirmed the heirs' possession of their lands in the Hispaniola and the perpetuity of the titles of alguacil mayor ("high sheriff") of Santo Domingo and of the Audiencia (tribunal) of the island.
- They ordered a payment of 10,000 ducats annually to the heirs of Columbus as well as 500,000 maravedíes per year to each of the sisters of Luis Colón.

== Minor lawsuits ==
After the arbitration of 1536, minor lawsuits between the Columbus family and the Crown continued, but they were not of comparable importance. Lawsuits occurred between 1537 and 1541, between 1555 and 1563, and sporadically until the end of the 18th century.

== Historical interest ==
Both the Columbus family and the Crown took testimony from witnesses to the various Castilian voyages of discovery to America. It has been a fundamental source of information for historians who study the era, but the accuracy of some of the testimonies is open to doubt.
