= Duke of Veragua =

Dukedom of Spain

Coats of arms of the Duchy of Veragua

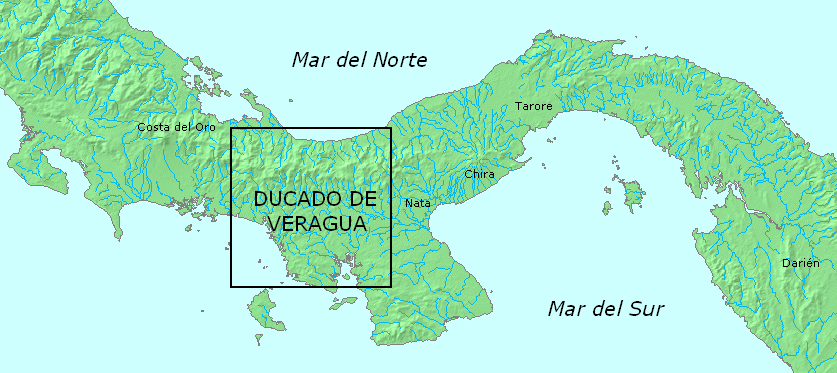
Duchy of Veragua

The Duchy of Veragua (Spanish: Ducado de Veragua) is a hereditary title in the Peerage of Spain, accompanied by the dignity of Grandee. It was also a Spanish hereditary domain created in 1537 in the reign of King Charles I in a small section of the territory of Veragua (Gobernación de Veragua, which had been created in 1502 and extended along the Caribbean coasts of present-day Nicaragua, Costa Rica, and Panama as far to the east as the Río Belén). This new lordship was granted by the Crown to Don Luis Colón y Toledo, grandson of the discoverer Christopher Columbus, along with the title of Duke of Veragua and Marquess of Jamaica. These are the only Spanish noble titles that did not originate from a royal concession but rather from a definitive settlement after a fierce legal dispute with the Crown. The case was arbitrated by Don Fray García de Loayza, Cardinal of Santa Susana, Bishop of Sigüenza, and confessor to the King.

The Dukedom was a perfect square of twenty-five leagues on a side, extending towards the west from the mouth of the Río Belén in the Caribbean, in what is today Panamanian territory. As Panama is less than twenty-five leagues in width at this point, the Duchy extended into the Pacific. By this circumstance, the area of the previous territorial division, Castilla de Oro, was split into two separated parts. The western part, from the Gulf of Nicoya to the border of the duchy, was united with Veragua Real (Royal Veragua) in 1540 to create the province of Nuevo Cartago y Costa Rica.

The first Duke of Veragua sent out various expeditions to try to enforce his authority throughout the territory, but they all resulted in disasters due to the resistance of the Indigenous peoples in their homeland and the difficulties of the topography and climate. In one of these expeditions the brother of the Duke, Francisco Colón, died at the hands of the natives.

In 1556 the Duke decided to return the domain to the Crown in exchange for an increased annual rent of 17,000 ducats (which was paid to his heirs up to 1898) and the retention of the title (which is still used in Spain). The current Duke of Veragua bears the same name as his ancestor, Cristóbal Colón.

In 1560, King Philip II created the Province of Veragua from the territory of the duchy, which was placed under the jurisdiction of the Royal Audiencia of Panama. This province corresponds approximately to the present-day Panamanian Veraguas Province.

== List of dukes of Veragua ==
From	To	Duke of Veragua
1537	1572	Luis Colón de Toledo, 1st Duke of Veragua
1572	1577	Felipa Colón de Toledo, 2nd Duchess of Veragua
1577	1583	Cristóbal Colón de Cardona, 3rd Duke of Veragua
1583	1626	Nuño Álvares Pereira Colón, 4th Duke of Veragua
1626	1636	Álvaro Colón, 5th Duke of Veragua
1636	1673	Pedro Nuño Colón de Portugal, 6th Duke of Veragua
1673	1710	Pedro Manuel Colón de Portugal, 7th Duke of Veragua
1710	1733	Pedro Manuel Nuño Colón de Portugal, 8th Duke of Veragua
1733	1739	Catalina Ventura Colón de Portugal, 9th Duchess of Veragua
1739	1785	James Fitz-James Stuart, 10th Duke of Veragua
1785	1787	Carlos Fitz-James Stuart, 11th Duke of Veragua
1787	1821	Mariano Colón de Larreátegui y Ximénez de Embún, 12th Duke of Veragua
1821	1866	Pedro Colón y Ramirez de Baquedano, 13th Duke of Veragua
1866	1910	Cristobal Colón y de La Cerda, 14th Duke of Veragua
1910	1936	Cristóbal Colón y Aguilera, 15th Duke of Veragua
1936	1941	Ramon Colón de Carvajal, 16th Duke of Veragua
1941	1986	Cristóbal Colón de Carvajal, 17th Duke of Veragua
1986	Present	Cristóbal Colón de Carvajal, 18th Duke of Veragua

== See also ==
- Veragua
- Pleitos colombinos
