= Luis Colón, 1st Duke of Veragua =

Grandson of Christopher Columbus

Admiral of the Ocean Sea Luis Colón de Toledo

3rd Admiral of the Ocean Sea
- In office 23 February 1526 – 3 February 1572
- Monarchs: Joanna (until 1555); Charles I (until 1556); Philip II (after 1556)
- Preceded by: Diego Columbus, 2nd Admiral
- Succeeded by: Diego Colón de Toledo y Pravia, 4th Admiral

1st Duke of Veragua
- In office June 28, 1536 – 3 February 1572
- Monarchs: Joanna (until 1555); Charles I (until 1556); Philip II (after 1556)
- Succeeded by: Felipa Colón de Toledo, 2nd Duchess

1st Marquess of Jamaica
- In office June 28, 1536 – 3 February 1572
- Monarchs: Joanna (until 1555); Charles I (until 1556); Philip II (after 1556)
- Succeeded by: Felipa Colón de Toledo, 2nd Marchioness

1st Duke of La Vega
- In office 17 March 1557 – 3 February 1572
- Monarch: Philip II
- Succeeded by: Felipa Colón de Toledo, 2nd Duchess

Personal details
- Born: c. 1521 Santo Domingo, Hispaniola, Viceroyalty of the Indies
- Died: February 3, 1572 (aged 52) Oran, Algeria
- Spouse(s): María de Orozco (m. 1542, annul. 1552/1558); María de Mosquera y Pasamonte (m. 1546, annul.1563/1571); Ana de Castro Osorio (m. 1554/1563-)
- Domestic partner: Luisa de Carvajal (1564)
- Children: 4, Maria, Felipa, Cristobal (illeg.), and Isabel
- Parent(s): Diego Columbus; Maria de Toledo

Luis Colón y Álvarez de Toledo, 3rd Admiral of the Ocean Sea, 1st Duke of Veragua, 1st Duke of la Vega, 1st Marquess of Jamaica (c. 1519/1520/1522 – 3 February 1572), was the first son of Diego Colón and María Álvarez de Toledo y Rojas, and grandson of Christopher Columbus.

After his father's death, a compromise was reached in the pleitos colombinos in 1536 in which he was named 3rd Admiral of the Indies and renounced all other rights for a perpetual annuity of 10,000 ducats, the island of Jamaica as a fief, the Dukedom of Veragua estate of 25 square leagues in the province of Veragua on the Isthmus of Panama, and the titles of 1st Duke of Veragua and 1st Marquess of Jamaica and 1st Duke of La Vega.

He married firstly in 1546 to María de Mosquera y Pasamonte, daughter of Juan de Mosquera and his wife Ofrasina de Pasamonte, and had:

- María Colón de Toledo y Mosquera, a nun in Valladolid
- Felipa Colón de Toledo, 2nd Duchess of Veragua

He married secondly in Valladolid, on 19 October 1555, to Ana de Castro Osorio, daughter of Beatriz de Castro Osório, 6th Countess of Lemos and Sárria, and her second husband Alvaro Osorio, without issue.

== See also ==
- Pleitos colombinos

Military offices
Preceded by Diego Colón	Admiral of the Indies; 1526–1572	Succeeded by Diego Colón de Toledo
Spanish nobility
Preceded by Diego Colón	Duke of Veragua; 1537–1572	Succeeded by Felipa Colón de Toledo
Preceded by Diego Colón	Marquess of Jamaica; 1537–1572	Succeeded by Felipa Colón de Toledo
New title	Duke of la Vega; 1557–1572	Succeeded by Felipa Colón de Toledo
