= Gaspar de Espinosa =

Spanish conquistador

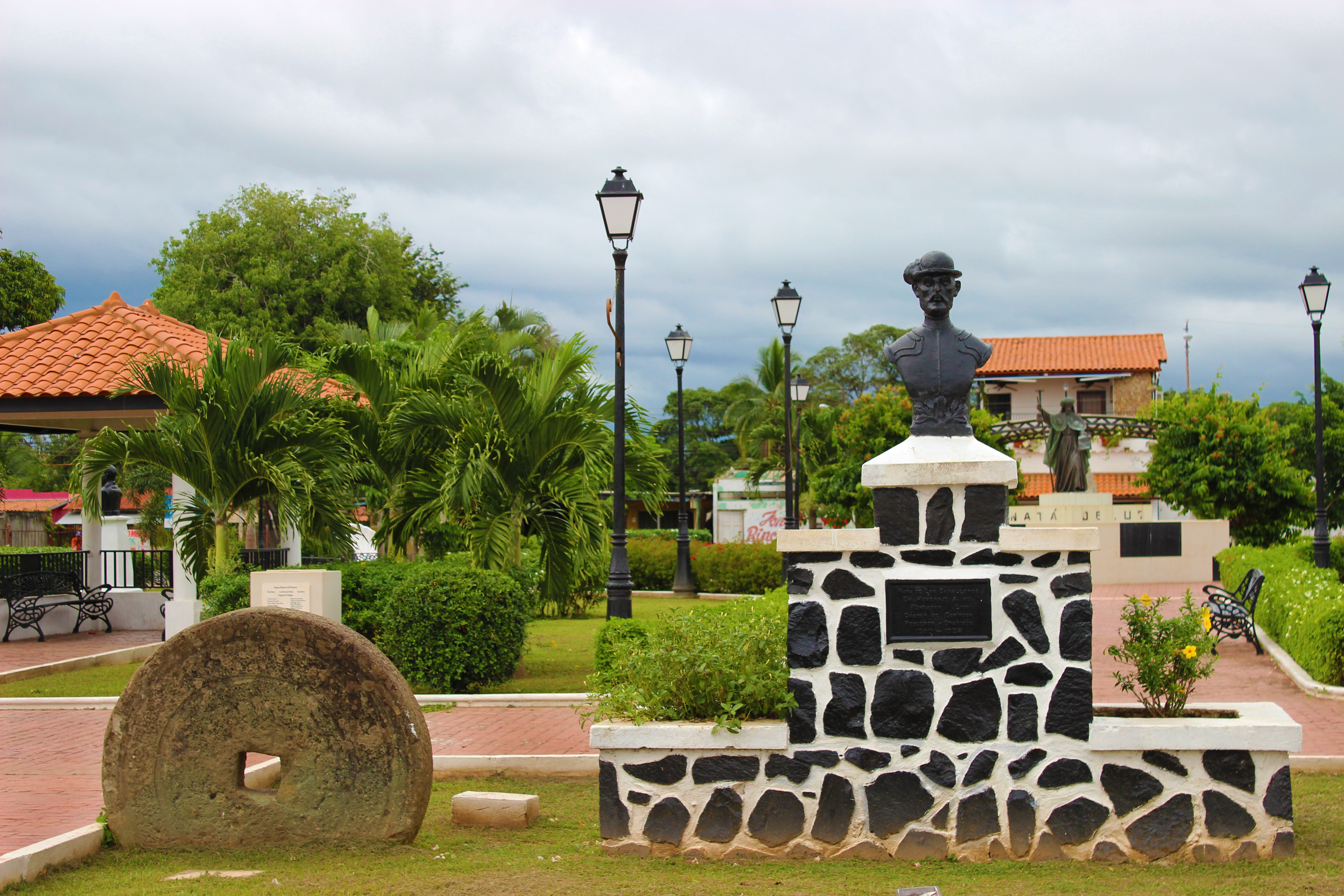
- Bust of Gaspar de Espinosa in Natá de los Caballeros.

Acting Governor of Santo Domingo and oidor of the Real Audiencia of Santo Domingo
- In office 1524–1527
- Monarch: Charles I
- Preceded by: Diego Colón
- Succeeded by: Sebastián Ramírez de Fuenleal

Lieutenant Governor General of Panamá
- In office October 1533 – January 1534
- Monarch: Charles I
- Preceded by: Diego Gutiérrez de los Ríos y Aguayo
- Succeeded by: Pedro Ramírez de Quiñones

Personal details
- Born: c. 1484 Medina de Rioseco, Crown of Castile
- Died: 14 February 1537 Cusco, New Toledo
- Profession: Oidor, explorer, conquistador, military, and governor
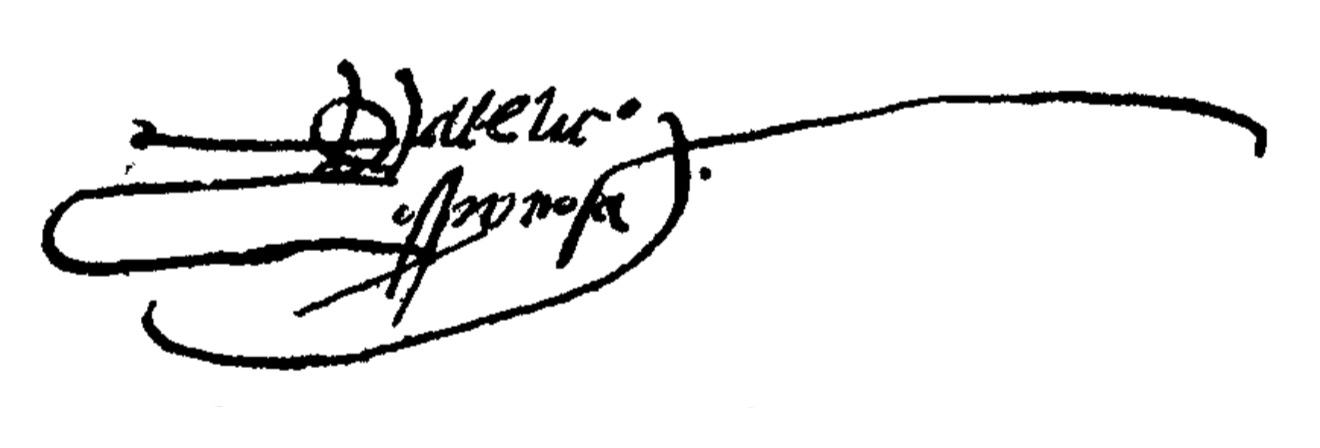
- Signature

Military service
- Allegiance: Spanish Empire
- Rank: Lieutenant

Gaspar de Espinosa y Luna (Medina de Rioseco, Spain, c. 1484 - Cuzco, Peru, 14 February 1537) was a Spanish explorer, conquistador and politician. He participated in the expedition of Pedro Arias Dávila to Darién and was appointed mayor of Santa María la Antigua del Darién. He initiated proceedings against Vasco Núñez de Balboa and conquered part of current Costa Rica. After living some time in Spain, he returned to America to join Francisco Pizarro and Diego de Almagro in the conquest of the Inca Empire.

== First years ==
He was born into a family of merchants and bankers, whose business was to direct trade between Flanders and Castilla from Medina de Rioseco. Later settled in Seville, where trade with the Indies were allowed to increase his fortune. Later, his family founded a bank that soon became the benchmark for commercial activity that took place in the rest of Europe and also in the New World.

== Travel to the Indies ==
Already in middle age, he sailed for the Spanish and in 1513 was elected mayor of Castilla del Oro. A year later he formed part of the issuance of Pedrarias Dávila to Darién. Participated in the founding of the city of Panama (1519) and was appointed mayor of Santa María la Antigua del Darién. He led the expedition to the Pacific coast of Central America and was one of the architects of the discovery of the Gulf of Nicoya.

He led an expedition to Veragua with Hernando de Soto in 1520.

He returned to Spain, but soon became ruler of Santo Domingo and Panama, and returned to sail to America.

Finally, he went to Peru where he financed with the help of his family, the expedition of Francisco Pizarro and Diego de Almagro, and tried, unsuccessfully, reconciliation between the two.

Espinosa's family was closely related to the court during the first half of the sixteenth century, it came as much of the funding for the expedition to the Moluccas conducted in 1525, and had previously provided funding for the conquest of Peru sufragrar.
