= Santa María de la Barca =

Spanish ship, wrecked 1511 or 1512

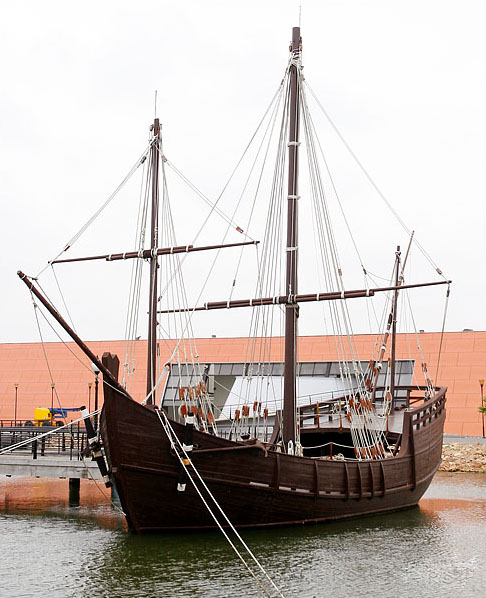
- Contemporary replica of a small, 1500s Spanish caravel

History

Castile
- Name: Santa María de la Barca (Note: Varies: La Santa María de la Barca in; Santa María de la Barca in; unnamed in.)
- Owner: A Nicuesa–Ojeda expeditionary leader (Note: De jure (to April 1511 latest): Nicuesa, Ojeda, Olano, Colmenares, Pizarro, Enciso, Juan de la Cosa. De facto (from December 1510 earliest): alcaldes of La Antigua (Balboa, Palazuelos, Zamudio) or other cabildo members. Nicuesa in.)
- Acquired: Unknown
- Maiden voyage: Unknown
- In service: At least in 1511 or 1512
- Fate: Sank on collision or in tempest in 1511 or 1512; 19°N 83°W

General characteristics
- Type: Caravel, brig, (Note: Bergantin: "A two-masted vessel, consisting of the mainmast and the foremast, with its bowsprit; with square sails, with their corresponding stays, jibs, etc., and a large gaff sail for the mainsail; although some, to take advantage of beam winds, carry an additional square-rigged mainsail. This type of lightweight craft came to be known in the 14th century". Also bregantin, carabelon. Not to be confused with bergantina ("vessel typical or characteristic of the Mediterranean, a hydrid of the xebec and bergantin").) or larger ship type (Note: Varies: navío in; carabela or caravel in; bergantín in; barco in; nave in. Where: navio was a vessel, large vessel, or ship of the line; carabela was a caravel; bergantin was a brig; barco was a vessel or small vessel; nave was a vessel or vessel larger than a quarter-galley.)

The Santa María de la Barca was a Spanish caravel, brig, or larger type of ship which sank in the northwestern Caribbean Sea in 1511 or 1512, during a series of Spanish colonisation efforts in the Gulf of Darien dating to 1509 and led by Diego de Nicuesa, Alonso de Ojeda, and Vasco Núñez de Balboa. The Santa María embarked on her final voyage in late 1511 or early 1512 from Santa María de la Antigua, despatched by Balboa to Santo Domingo to procure men, arms, and provisions for the Spanish discovery of the South Sea. She foundered and sank off the Yucatan Peninsula, upon running aground or hitting a storm. She is most notable today for two of her survivors, Jerónimo de Aguilar and Gonzalo Guerrero, who were stranded in the pre-conquest Maya Lowlands for years, and thereafter aided (in the former's case) in the Spanish conquest of the Aztec Empire, or helped to hinder (latter's case) that of the Mayas.

== Background ==
Virtually nothing is known of the Santa María's characteristics and history prior to entering service. She is thought to have been a caravel, brig, or some other, larger type of vessel, and thought to have entered service before or during the Spanish expeditions to colonise Veragua (Note: Also Darién, Veraguas, Castilla de Oro, Castilla del Oro. From Cape Gracias a Dios south to Rio Grande del Darien (modern Rio Atrato) or to median line of Gulf of Uraba. Southern portion (from Rio Belen to Rio Grande or Uraba median) split off and renamed Castilla de Oro in mid-1513.) and New Andalusia, (Note: Also Darién, Nueva Andalucía, Urabá. From Rio Grande del Darien (modern Rio Atrato) or from median line of Gulf of Uraba east to Cabo de la Vela.) in the Gulf of Darien, by Diego de Nicuesa and Alonso de Ojeda (authorised or commissioned on 9 June 1508 in Burgos).

=== Nicuesa–Ojeda expeditions ===
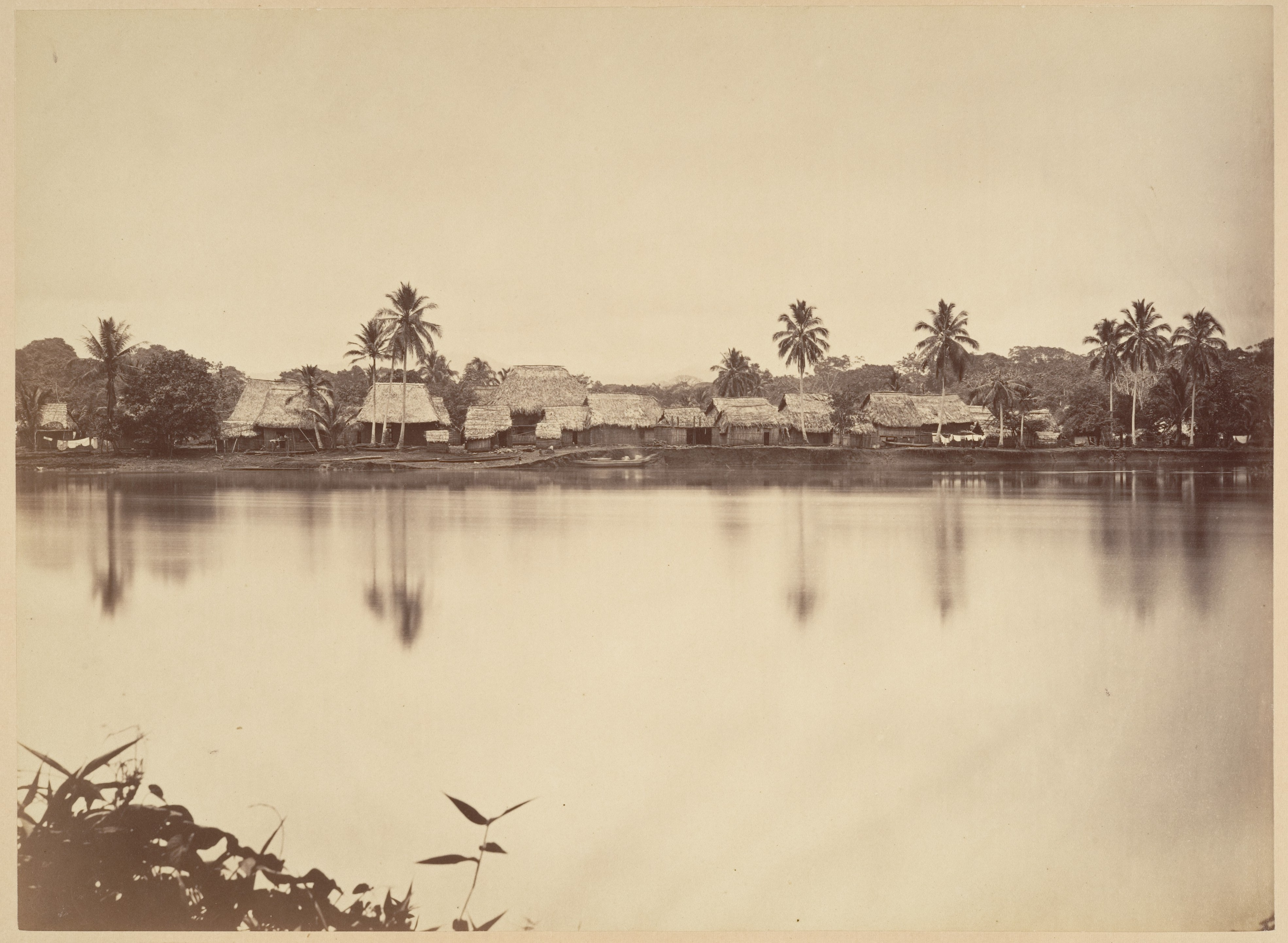
19th century village in modern Darien Gap (historical south Veragua)

Nicuesa (with Lope de Olano) set sail from Santo Domingo in November 1509 (in three or four vessels), and made port sometime later in Veragua (vessels wrecked or scuttled). Rodrigo de Colmenares (his lieutenant or second-in-command) reached him in northern Veragua sometime in late 1510 (in a brig), having anchored in southern Veragua from November (in at least two craft). Ojeda (with Francisco Pizarro) likewise put to sea from Santo Domingo in November 1509 (in three or four vessels), and reached Cartagena at some later point. Martín Fernández de Enciso (his lieutenant) followed in September 1510 (in a large ship and a brig, with Vasco Núñez de Balboa), and subsequently found Pizarro in Cartagena (sans Ojeda, sans fleet). Enciso and Pizarro then ran to New Andalusia (and lost Enciso's larger craft), after which they crossed the Gulf of Uraba (and so entered southern Veragua), and founded La Guardia in November 1510. The cabildo (Balboa and Juan de Valdivia (Note: Forename varies: Pedro in; Juan in. Surname varies: Valdivia in; de Valdivia in; de Valdisievo in; de Valdenia in; Valdibia in. Not to be confused with the Chilean conquistador Pedro de Valdivia.) members) soon rechristened the villa Santa María de la Antigua (Note: Also Dariena, La Antigua, Santa María la Antigua, Santa María la Antigua del Darién, Santa María de la Antigua del Darién.) and seized all craft at port, after which Colmenares arrived (November 1510).

By April 1511, both the Nicuesa and Ojeda expeditions had come under the de facto control of Balboa, as Nicuesa (but not his men) had been barred from the villa (left port on 1 March 1511 in Colmenares's brig), whilst Enciso (but not his nor Pizarro's men) willingly or forcibly left the same (on 4 April 1511 in one of Colmenares's vessels). The brig (with Nicuesa) was lost at sea, but the second craft (which had disembarked Enciso in Santo Domingo) returned with Valdivia (who had been on the outbound trip) in August or September 1511.

== Career ==
The only trip by Santa María known with certainty is the one which wrecked her. By the time of Valdivia's return, La Antigua was in some duress (having not been provisioned since its founding), whilst Balboa had learnt of the existence of the South Sea (from Panquiaco, son of Comogra, a cacique who resided nearby). Consequently, Balboa instructed Valdivia to make the trip again, to relay Panquiaco's intelligence to Diego Columbus, request men (1,000), arms, and provisions, and pay the royal fifth they owed (10 or 15,000 pesos).

Valdivia thus loaded the cargo, rigged his ship, weighed anchor and put to sea in late 1511 or early 1512. The Santa María set off due north from La Antigua to Santo Domingo, captained by Valdivia, and carrying at least Jerónimo de Aguilar and Gonzalo Guerrero. Some while into her voyage, though, disaster struck, as the Santa María either ran aground on some reefs or banks (Los Alacranes or Las Viboras), or else was struck by a storm or hurricane, sinking some distance east of Yucatan (and south of Cuba) in either case.

Some 20 or 30 souls are thought to have survived, including Valdivia, Aguilar, and Guerrero. As the Santa María went under, they reportedly scrambled on to one of her rowing skiffs, (Note: Batel: a skiff or smaller craft, carried by larger vessels.) hoping the currents would suffice to reach dry land. They may have naturally sought to drift to the Greater Antilles (Spanish territory), but were rather circuitously (in about a fortnight, with at least some fatalities) carried to Yucatan (Maya territory then).

=== Aftermath ===
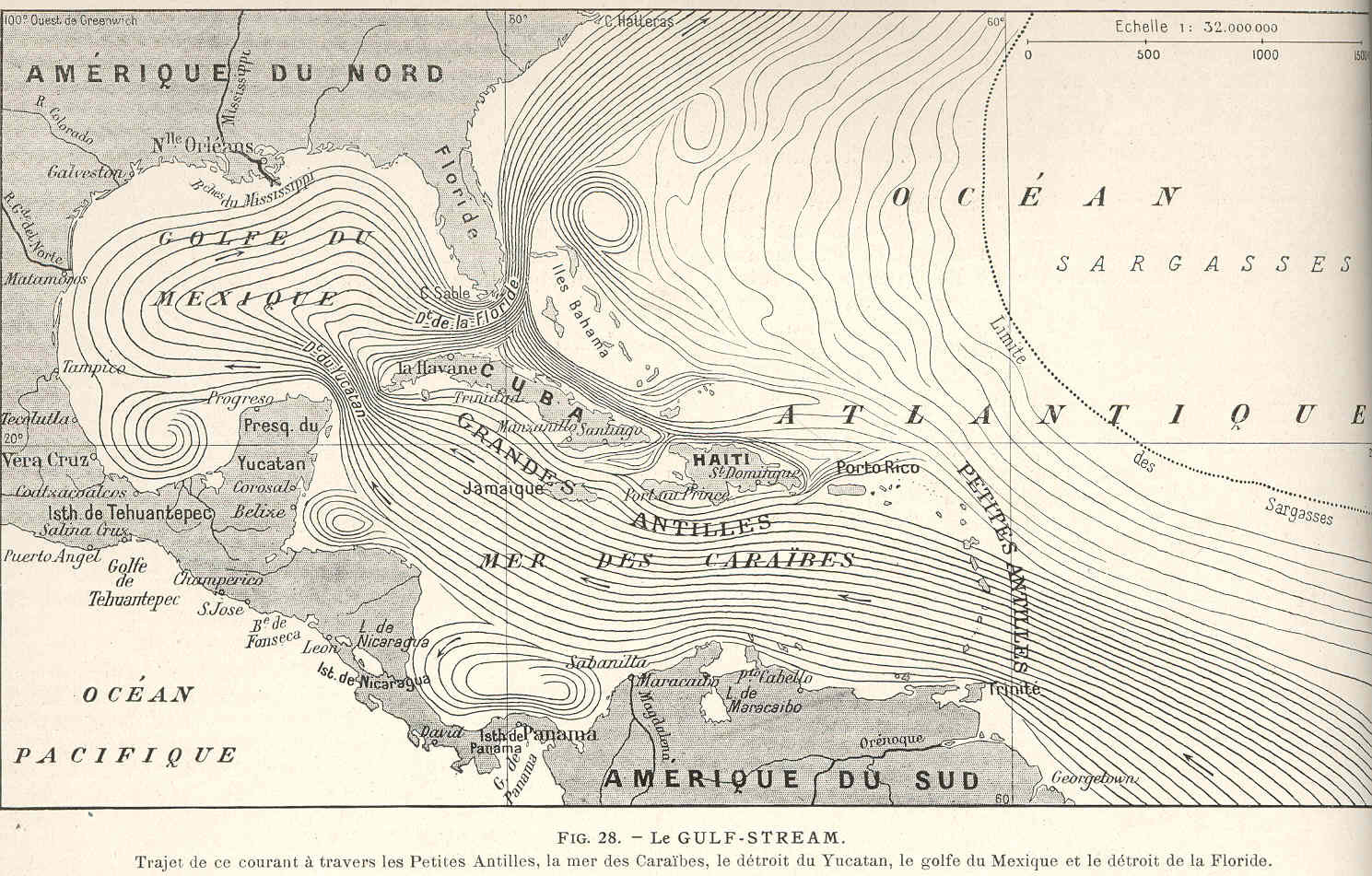
Caribbean currents, including northwesterly one towards Yucatan

On washing ashore, the shipwreck survivors were reputedly soon spotted by locals, apprehended, and taken before the batab (mayor) or halach uinic (governor). The lord, by some accounts, had the captain and four others ritually sacrificed (and their flesh feasted upon in banquets), whilst Aguilar, Guerrero, and five or six others were held captive and well-fed (presumably to fill them out a bit for a later repeat of the festivities). Sooner or later, though, a lapse in security apparently allowed at least Aguilar and Guerrero to escape, whereupon they were taken in (or discovered) by a second batab or halach uinic, presumably an enemy of the former, who spared their lives but made them slaves for said mercy.

By the time Hernán Cortés landed in Cozumel in early 1519, of the circa 20 or 30 initial Santa María survivors, only Aguilar and Guerrero seemingly remained (alive and in the Lowlands). Aguilar is thought to have spent the intervening years in northern Yucatan, in slavery, until Cortes bought (or his master granted) his freedom. Guerrero, on the other hand, is thought to have been gifted (a slave) to Nachan Can, (Note: Also Na Chan Can.) the halach uinic of Chetumal (in southern Yucatan), in or prior to 1514. He seemingly adopted the Postclassic province as his new home (becoming a nacom or war captain, and marrying into the Can family), as unlike Aguilar, he is said to have rejected Cortes's offer of rescue in 1519.

Having had no news of the Santa María, and anxious for men and arms to embark on their isthmian crossing to the South Sea, Balboa and the cabildo of La Antigua next despatched Colmenares and Juan de Caicedo to Columbus. They set sail sometime during September to November 1512, and arrived three or four months later. Balboa's report (from Panquiaco) was much welcomed in Santo Domingo, such that La Antigua soon started receiving a steady stream of merchants and conquistadors, thereby facilitating the conquistador's march to the Bay of San Miguel on 1 September 1513.

Meanwhile, in the Castilian court, having not received the royal fifth (amongst other reasons), Ferdinand the Catholic stripped Balboa of his interim governorship by appointing Pedro Arias Dávila governor of Castilla de Oro (as southern Veragua was now to be known) by mid-1513. Notice of the impending arrival of Davila and the (now widely presumed) loss of the Santa María was conveyed to La Antigua by Pedro de Arbolancha by late 1513 or early 1514.

== Legacy ==
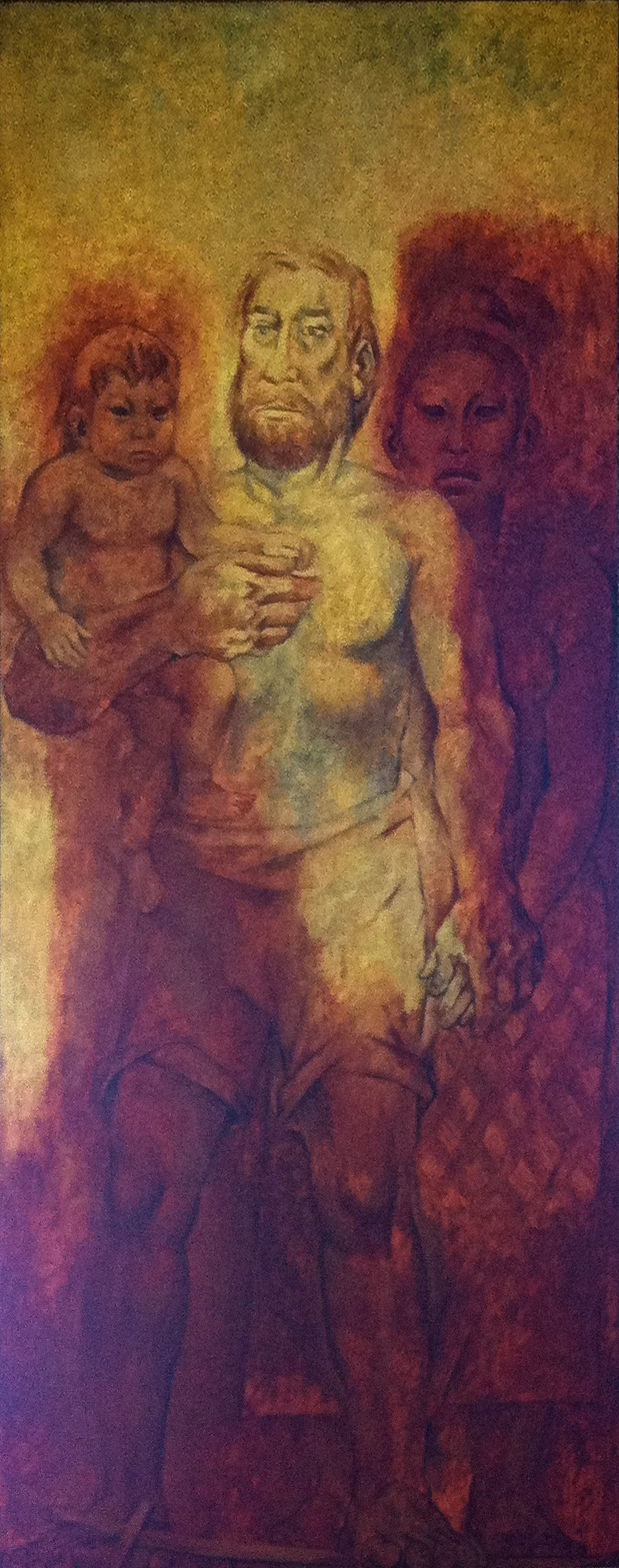
Contemporary Mexican mural depicting a Santa María survivor with his Maya wife and Mestizo child

Three brief, second-hand accounts of the Santa María's last voyage survive, namely: by Cortes, Bernal Díaz del Castillo, and Andrés de Tapia, all of whom met Aguilar upon his rescue in 1519. A number of similarly short, third-hand accounts (by cronistas de Indias (Note: Early chroniclers of Spanish exploration, conquest, and colonisation of the New World.) who may not have met the survivors) are likewise extant, namely (in chronological order): by Peter Martyr, Francisco López de Gómara, Bartolomé de las Casas, Francisco Cervantes de Salazar, Diego de Landa, Antonio de Herrera y Tordesillas, and Antonio de Solís y Ribadeneyra.

Some scholars regard the survivors' stranding as the first meeting of the Lowland Maya and an Old World people, and therefore tentatively credit it with introducing new diseases to Yucatan. Some further credit their stay as transforming Postclassic Lowland society, though some Mayanists dispute this.

The Santa María is most notable in popular culture for her sinking and known survivors, Aguilar and Guerrero. The incident and aftermath have been depicted in Hispanic works since the sixteenth century, and Guerrero, especially, has been mythicised to some extent in Mexico.

== See also ==
- List of shipwrecks in the 16th century

== Notes and references ==
=== References ===
- Demarest A (2007) [first published 2004]. Ancient Maya (4th reprint of 1st ed.). Cambridge: CUP. ISBN 978-0-521-59224-6.
- "Diccionario biográfico electrónico". Historia hispánica. 2018. OCLC 1076520403.
- Diccionario marítimo español. Madrid: Imprenta Real. 1831. OCLC 1025248273.
- de Dios Gonzalez J (2008). "Gonzalo Guerrero". Inventio. 4 (7): 25–28. ISSN 2448-9026.
- McLellan A (2020). From Lamanai to Ka'kabish (PhD). London: University College London. OCLC 1197758147.
- Medina JT (1914). Nunez de Balboa. El descubrimiento del Océano Pacífico. Vol. 1. Santiago, Chile: Imprenta Universitaria. OCLC 21360826. OL 1271236W.
- Moreno Amador C (2020). "La batalla de Centla". In de Pazzis Pi Corrales M, de Bremond Mayans AS, Diaz-Sanchez C (eds.). La batalla. Madrid: Ministerio de Defensa. pp. 639–674. hdl:20.500.14352/117326. ISBN 978-84-09-24076-0.
