= Acla =

Human settlement in Panama

Coordinates: 8°50′02.47″N 77°37′54.47″W

Acla was a Spanish colonial town founded by order of the Governor of Castilla de Oro, Pedrarias Dávila, in 1515. It was located on the central coastline of the modern-day Guna Yala, to the northeast of Panama. The town's name means bones of men in the indigenous language. The name comes from the large number of bones strewn about the nearby plains, which supposedly came from the conflicts between two indigenous brothers who fought to become chiefs of the region.

The town was established principally to be the Caribbean anchor of a trail that was planned to lead to a future town on the Gulf of San Miguel on the Pacific Ocean, which had recently been discovered by Vasco Núñez de Balboa. This town is mostly famous because it was the site of the judgement and decapitation of Núñez de Balboa in 1519 at the hands of Governor Dávila.

Due to the unhealthy nature of the climate and terrain surrounding the town, and especially after the founding of Panama City and Nombre de Dios a few months later, it was slowly abandoned until it was left totally deserted in 1532. However, a document from the General Archive of Indies (Archivo General de Indias) documenting an Assault to the town of Acla dates back to May 31st, 1535.
