= Vasco Núñez de Balboa =

Spanish explorer, governor, and conquistador (c. 1475–1519)

Adelantado Vasco Núñez de Balboa
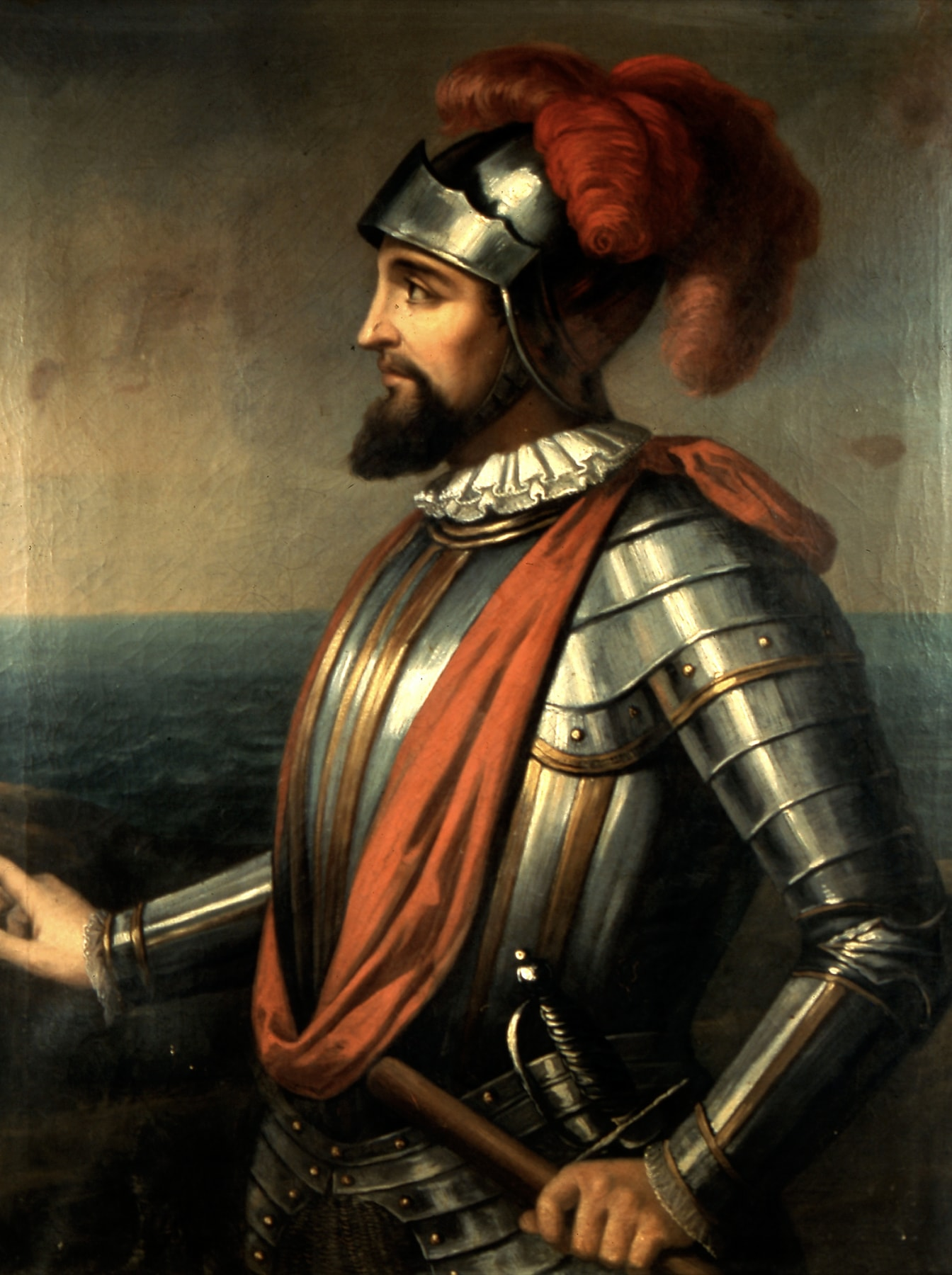
- Vasco Núñez de Balboa
- Born: c. 1475; Jerez de los Caballeros, Crown of Castile (today Spain)
- Died: January 1519 (aged c. 43–44); Acla, Spanish Empire (today Panama)
- Cause of death: Execution by decapitation
- Occupations: Maritime explorer for the Crown of Castile
- Spouse: María de Peñalosa

Signature
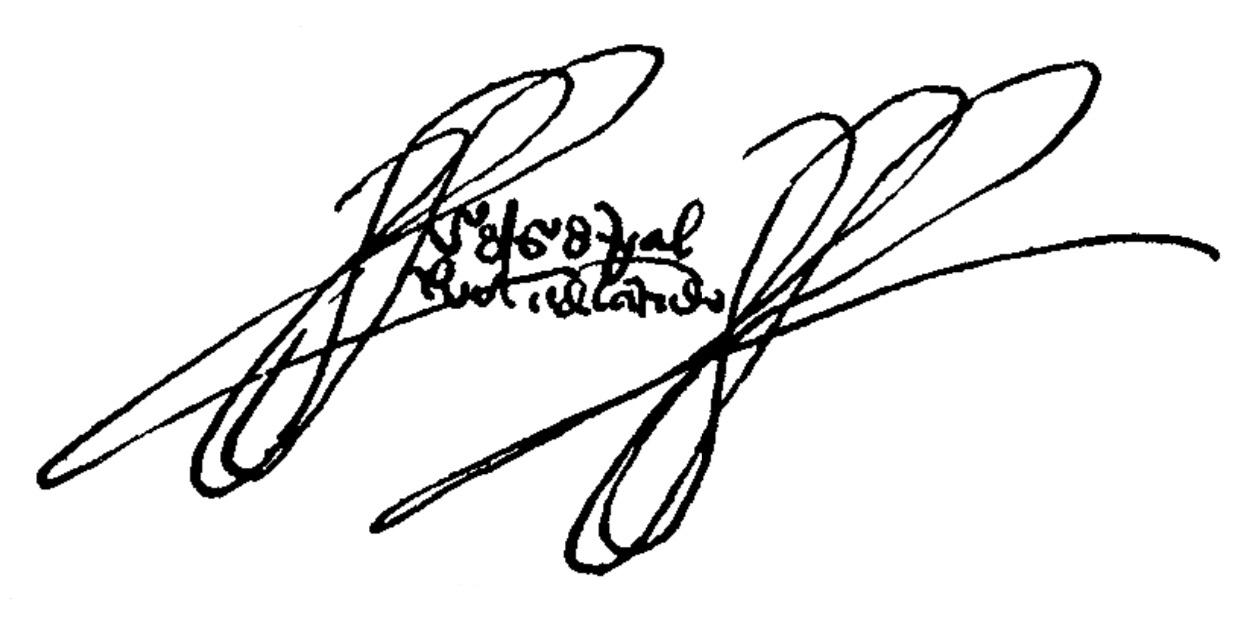

Vasco Núñez de Balboa (Spanish pronunciation: [ˈbasko ˈnuɲeθ ðe βalˈβo.a]; c. 1475 – around January 12–21, 1519) (Note: The dates 12 January, 15 January and 21 January appear in sources.) was a Spanish explorer, governor, conquistador, adelantado, and a pirate. He is best known for being the first European to discover the Pacific Ocean while crossing the Isthmus of Panama in 1513.

He traveled to the New World in 1500 and, after some exploration, settled on the island of Hispaniola. He founded the settlement of Santa María la Antigua del Darién in present-day Colombia in 1510, which was the first permanent European settlement on the mainland of the Americas (a settlement by Alonso de Ojeda the previous year at San Sebastián de Urabá had already been abandoned).

== Early life ==
Balboa was born in Jerez de los Caballeros, Spain. He was a descendant of the Lord mason of the castle of Balboa, on the borders of León and Galicia. His mother was the Lady de Badajoz, and his father was the hidalgo (nobleman) Nuño Arias de Balboa. Little is known of Vasco's early childhood except that he was the third of four boys in his family. During his adolescence, he served as a page and squire to Don Pedro de Portocarrero, lord of Moguer.

== Early career ==
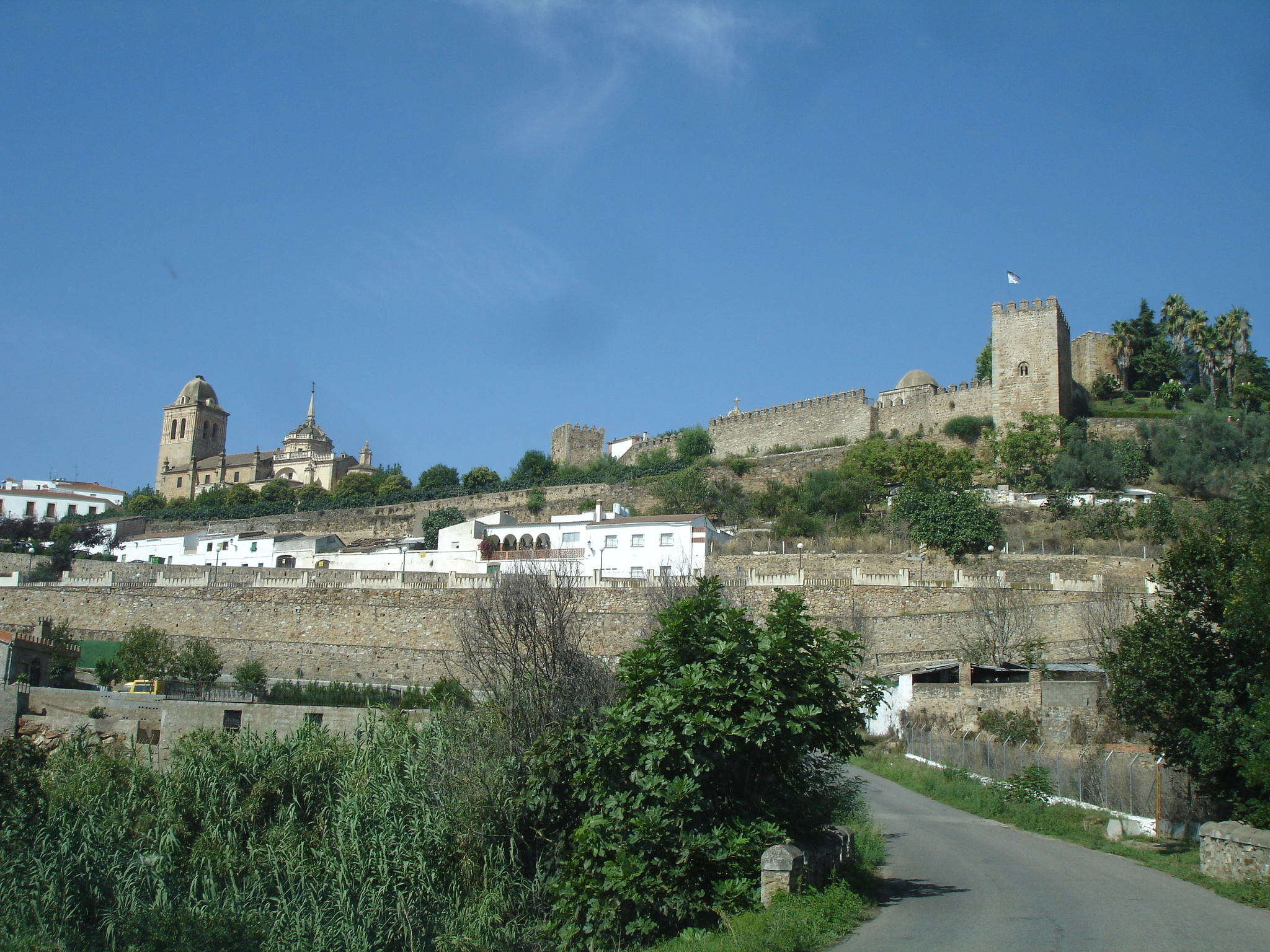
View of Jerez de los Caballeros

In 1500, motivated by his master after the news of Christopher Columbus's voyages to the New World became known, he decided to embark on his first voyage to the Americas, along with Juan de la Cosa, on Rodrigo de Bastidas' expedition. Bastidas had a license to bring back treasure for the king and queen, while keeping four-fifths for himself, under a policy known as the quinto real, or "royal fifth". In 1501, he crossed the Caribbean coasts from the east of Panama, along the Colombian coast, through the Gulf of Urabá toward Cabo de la Vela. The expedition continued to explore the northeast of South America, until they realized they did not have enough men and sailed to Hispaniola.

With his share of the earnings from this campaign, Balboa settled in Hispaniola in 1505, where he resided for several years as a planter and pig farmer. He was not successful in this enterprise, and ended up in debt, and was forced to abandon life on the island.

In 1508, the king of Spain, Ferdinand II "The Catholic", launched the conquest of Tierra Firme (the area roughly corresponding to the Isthmus of Panama). He created two new territories in the region between El Cabo de la Vela (near the eastern border of Colombia) and El Cabo de Gracias a Dios (the border between Honduras and Nicaragua). The Gulf of Urabá became the border between the two territories: Nueva Andalucía to the east, governed by Alonso de Ojeda, and Veragua to the west, governed by Diego de Nicuesa.

In 1509, wishing to escape his creditors in Santo Domingo, Balboa set sail as a stowaway, hiding inside a barrel together with his dog Leoncico, in the expedition commanded by the Alcalde Mayor (Note: Alcalde Mayor: may be translated as mayor or chief judge—a position combining judicial, military, civil, and police powers, that may or may not be held by a person with legal training.) of Nueva Andalucía, Martín Fernández de Enciso, whose mission it was to aid Alonso de Ojeda, his superior.

Ojeda, together with 70 men, had founded the settlement of San Sebastián de Urabá in Nueva Andalucía, on the location where the city of Cartagena de Indias was later built. The settlers encountered resistance from natives living in the area, who used poisoned weapons, and Ojeda was injured in the leg. A short time later, Ojeda sailed for Hispaniola, leaving the colony under the supervision of Francisco Pizarro, who, at that time, was only a soldier waiting for Enciso's expedition to arrive. Ojeda asked Pizarro to leave some men in the settlement for 50 days and, if no help arrived at the end of that time, to use all possible means to get back to Hispaniola.

Before the expedition arrived at San Sebastián de Urabá, Fernández de Enciso discovered Balboa aboard the ship, and threatened to leave him at the first uninhabited island they encountered. He later reconsidered this and decided that Balboa's knowledge of that region, which he had explored eight years before, would be of great utility. This, in addition to the crew's pleas for his life, left Fernández de Enciso with no choice but to spare Balboa and keep him aboard. Moreover, both agreed on removing Nicuesa as governor of Veragua.

After the 50 days had passed, Pizarro started preparations for the return to Hispaniola, when Enciso's ship arrived. Balboa had gained popularity among the crew because of his charisma and his knowledge of the region. By contrast Fernández de Enciso was not well liked by the men. Many disapproved of his order to return to San Sebastián, especially after discovering, once they had arrived, that the settlement had been completely destroyed and that the natives were already waiting for them, leading to a series of relentless attacks.

== The founding of Santa María ==
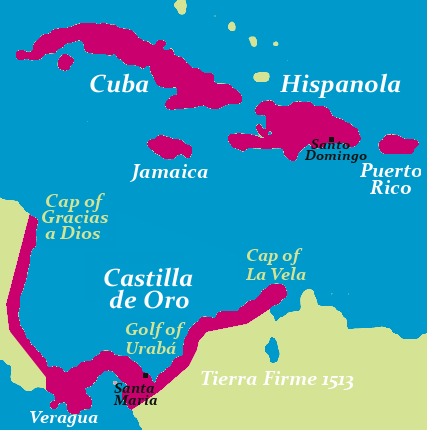
Tierra Firme 1513 – Castilla de Oro

Balboa suggested that the settlement of San Sebastián be moved to the region of Darién, to the west of the Gulf of Urabá, where the soil was more fertile and the natives presented less resistance. Fernández de Enciso gave serious consideration to this suggestion, and the regiment later went to Darién, where the native cacique (chieftain) Cémaco had 500 warriors waiting, ready for battle. The Spanish, fearing the large number of enemy combatants, made a vow to the Virgen de la Antigua, venerated in Seville, that they would name a settlement in the region after her should they prevail. It was a difficult battle for both sides, but the Spanish were victorious.

Cémaco, with his warriors, abandoned the town and headed for the jungle. It is believed at this point in Balboa's life that he and his army first broke from Spanish rule and turned to piracy. He and his army plundered the homes of local villagers, gathering a treasure trove of golden ornaments. Balboa kept his vow. In September 1510, he founded the first permanent settlement on mainland American soil, and called it Santa María la Antigua del Darién.

== Mayor of Santa María ==
The victory of Balboa and his army over the natives and the founding of Santa María la Antigua del Darién, now located in a relatively calm region, earned Balboa authority and respect among his companions. They were increasingly hostile toward Alcalde Mayor Fernández de Enciso, whom they considered a greedy despot because of the restrictions he imposed on their appropriation of the natives' gold.

Balboa took advantage of the situation, acting as the spokesman for the disgruntled settlers. He removed Fernández de Enciso from the position of alcalde mayor, using the following legal manoeuvre: Fernández de Enciso was now controlling an area in Veragua, to the west of the Gulf of Urabá; since he was substituting for Alonso de Ojeda, his mandate was illegitimate, because the governor of Veragua was Diego de Nicuesa, not Ojeda; therefore, Fernández de Enciso should be deposed and arrested. After Fernández de Enciso's ouster, a more open government was established and a municipal council was elected (the first in the Americas). Two alcaldes were appointed: Martín Samudio and Vasco Núñez de Balboa.

Shortly after this, a flotilla led by Rodrigo Enrique de Colmenares arrived in Santa María. His objective was to find Nicuesa, who was also facing some difficulties in the north of Panamá. When de Colmenares learned about the recent events, he convinced the town's settlers that they should submit to the authority of Nicuesa, since their land was under his jurisdiction. Enrique de Colmenares invited two representatives, to be named by the local government, to travel with his flotilla and offer Nicuesa authority over the city. The two representatives were Diego de Albites and Diego del Corral.

== Governor of Veragua ==
Enrique de Colmenares found Nicuesa near the town of Nombre de Dios, badly wounded and with few men remaining, on account of a skirmish with local natives. After his rescue, Governor Nicuesa heard about Balboa's exploits, the chieftain Cémaco's bounty, and Santa María's prosperity. He vowed that he would punish Balboa as soon as he gained control of the city, since he regarded his actions as a challenge to his authority in Veragua.

A certain Lope de Olano, who was jailed together with other malcontents, persuaded Santa María's representatives that they would make a serious error in handing control over to Nicuesa, whom he described as cruel, greedy, and able to singlehandedly destroy the city's prosperity. With this evidence, Albites and del Corral fled to Darién ahead of Nicuesa, and informed Balboa and the municipal authorities of the governor's intentions.

When Nicuesa arrived at the city's port, a mob appeared, and the ensuing disturbance prevented the governor from disembarking into the city. Nicuesa insisted on being received, no longer as governor, but as a simple soldier, but still the colonists did not allow him to disembark. He and 17 others were forced to board an unseaworthy boat with few supplies, and were put out to sea on March 1, 1511. The ship disappeared, leaving no trace of Nicuesa and his men. In this way, Balboa became governor (gobernador) of Veragua.

== Conquistador ==
With the title of governor came absolute authority in Santa María and all of Veragua. One of Balboa's first acts as governor was the trial of Fernández de Enciso, accused of usurping the governor's authority. Fernández de Enciso was sentenced to prison and his possessions were confiscated. He was to remain imprisoned only for a short time. Balboa set him free under the condition that he return immediately to Hispaniola and from there to Spain. With him on the same ship were two representatives from Balboa, who were to inform the colonial authorities of the situation, and request more men and supplies to continue the conquest of Veragua.

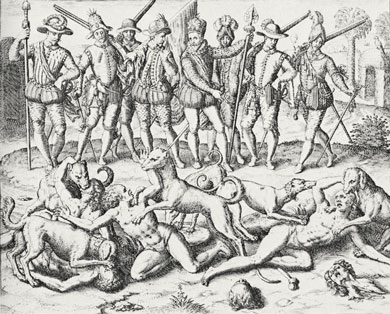
Balboa setting his dogs upon native practitioners of homosexuality (1594); engraving from the New York Public Library. The rendering was by the Flemish Protestant artist Theodor de Bry.

Balboa continued defeating various tribes and befriending others, exploring rivers, mountains, and sickly swamps, while always searching for gold and slaves and enlarging his territory. He was able to quell revolts among his men who challenged this authority, and through force, diplomacy, and negotiation, he earned a certain respect and fear among the natives. In a letter addressed to the King of Spain, he expressed, somewhat ironically, that he had to act as a conciliatory force during the course of his expeditions.

He succeeded in planting corn, received fresh supplies from Hispaniola and Spain, and got his men accustomed to life as explorers in the new territories. Balboa managed to collect a great deal of gold, much of it from the ornaments worn by native women, and the rest obtained by violence.

The Italian historian Peter Martyr d'Anghiera in his De orbe novo decades describes Balboa unleashing his dogs to kill 40 natives for their apparent sodomy. The writer Genny Beeman believes that this was a persecution of the natives for breaking the gender binary, since the natives had been assigned male at birth but were taking on female gender roles.

At the end of 1512 and the first months of 1513, he arrived in a region dominated by the cacique Careta, whom he easily defeated and then befriended. Careta was baptized and became one of Balboa's chief allies. He ensured the survival of the settlers by promising to supply the Spaniards with food. Balboa then proceeded on his journey, arriving in the lands of Careta's neighbour and rival, cacique Ponca, who fled to the mountains with his people, leaving his village open to plundering by the Spaniards and Careta's men. Days later, the expedition arrived in the lands of cacique Comogre, fertile but reportedly dangerous terrain. Balboa was received peacefully, and even invited to a feast in his honor; Comogre, like Careta, was then baptized.

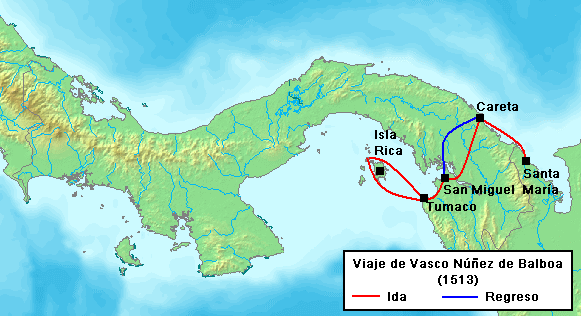
Balboa's travel route to the South Sea, 1513

In 1513, Balboa wrote a lengthy letter to the King of Spain, requesting more men (who were already acclimatized) from Hispaniola, weapons, supplies, carpenters versed in shipbuilding, and all the necessary materials for the building of a shipyard. In a subsequent letter, from 1515, he said the "Indians who had been like sheep had become like lions." He would refer to his humanitarian policies regarding the natives, while at the same time recommending extreme severity in dealing with cannibals and violent tribes.

It was in Comogre's lands that Balboa first heard of "the other sea". It started with a squabble among the Spaniards, unsatisfied by the meager amounts of gold they were being allotted. Comogre's eldest son, Panquiaco, angered by the Spaniards' avarice, knocked over the scales used to measure gold and exclaimed: "If you are so hungry for gold that you leave your lands to cause strife in those of others, I shall show you a province where you can quell this hunger." Panquiaco told them of a kingdom to the south, where people were so rich that they ate and drank from plates and goblets made of gold, but that the conquerors would need at least a thousand men to defeat the tribes living inland and those on the coast of "the other sea".

== European discovery of the Pacific Ocean ==
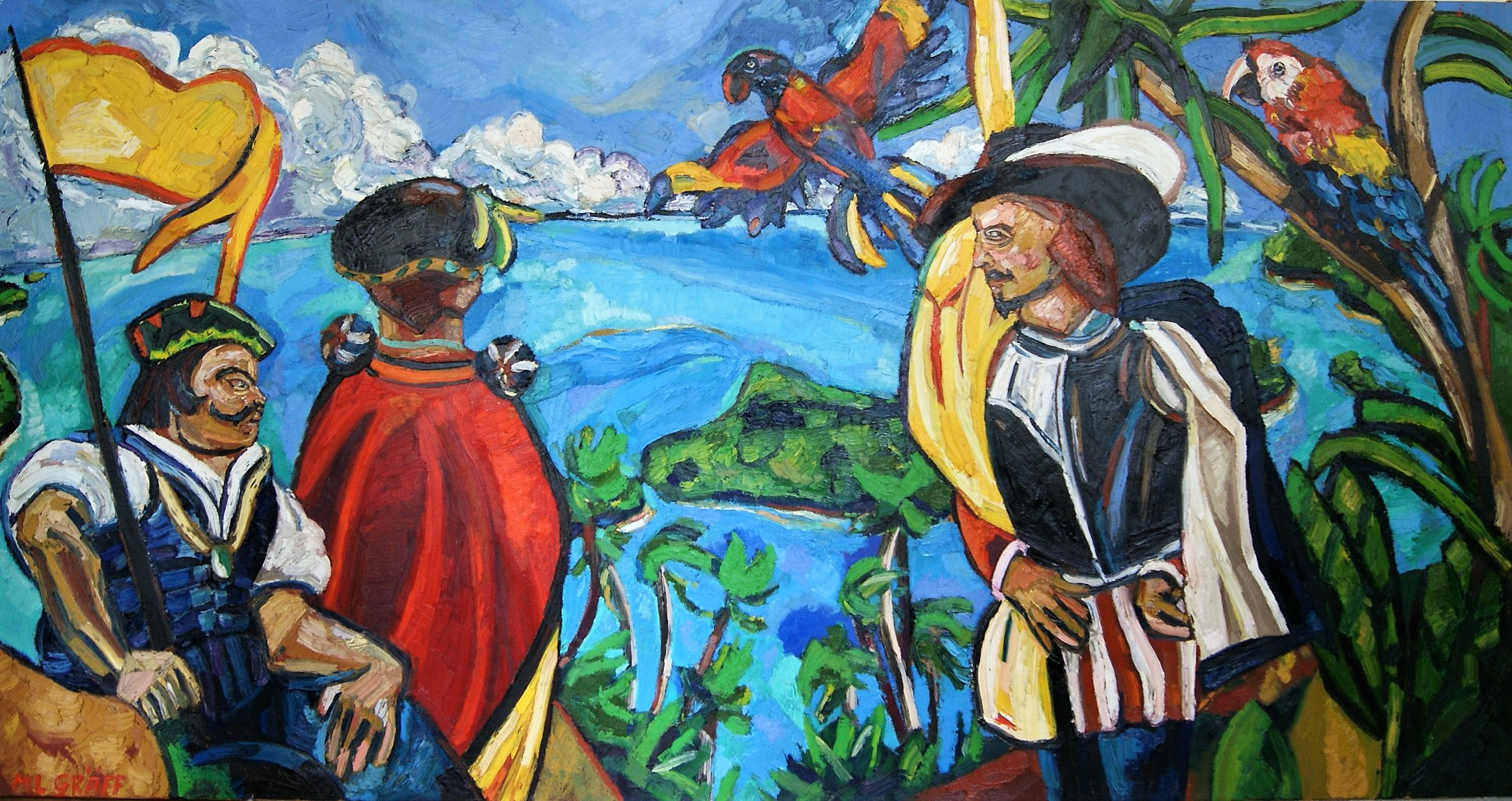
The discovery of the Pacific by Vasco Núñez de Balboa, Panama – 9/25/1513, painting by Matthias Laurenz Gräff (2009/10)

Balboa received the unexpected news of a new kingdom – rich in gold – with great interest. He returned to Santa María at the beginning of 1513 to recruit more men from Hispaniola. There he learned that Fernández de Enciso had told the colonial authorities what had happened at Santa María. After seeing that there would be no assistance from Hispaniola, Balboa sent Enrique de Colmenares directly to Spain to seek help.

While the expedition to the South Sea (the name at the time of the Pacific Ocean) was being organized in Santa María, some explorers travelled ten leagues (around 50 km or 30 miles) up the Atrato River toward the interior, but returned empty handed. Balboa's request for men and supplies had been denied: Enciso's case was by then widely known in the Spanish court. Therefore, Balboa had no choice but to carry out his expedition with the few resources that he had on hand in Santa María.

Using information given by various friendly caciques, Balboa started his journey across the Isthmus of Panama on September 1, 1513, together with 190 Spaniards, a few native guides, and a pack of dogs. Using a small brigantine and ten native canoes, they sailed along the coast and made landfall in cacique Careta's territory. On September 6, the expedition continued, now reinforced with 1,000 of Careta's men, and entered cacique Ponca's land. Ponca had reorganized and attacked, but he was defeated and forced to ally himself with Balboa. After a few days, and with several of Ponca's men, the expedition entered the dense jungle on September 20, and, with some difficulty, arrived four days later in the lands of cacique Torecha, who ruled in the village of Cuarecuá. In this village, a fierce battle took place, during which Balboa's forces defeated Torecha, who was killed by one of Balboa's dogs. Torecha's followers decided to join the expedition. The group was by then exhausted and several men were badly wounded, so many decided to stay in Cuarecuá to regain their strength.

The few men who continued the journey with Balboa entered the mountain range along the Chucunaque River the next day. According to information from the natives, one could see the South Sea from the summit of this range. Balboa went ahead and, before noon that day, September 25, he reached the summit and saw, far in the horizon, the waters of the undiscovered sea. The emotions were such that the others eagerly joined in to show their joy at Balboa's discovery. Andrés de Vera, the expedition's chaplain, intoned the Te Deum, while the men erected stone pyramids, and engraved crosses on the barks of trees with their swords, to mark the place where the discovery of the South Sea was made.

== Possession and conquest of the South Sea ==
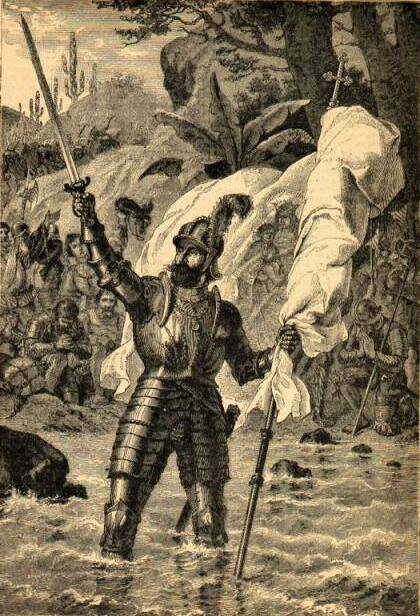
Balboa claiming possession of the South Sea (19th century engraving by unknown artist)

After the moment of discovery, the expedition descended from the mountain range towards the sea, arriving in the lands of cacique Chiapes, who was defeated after a brief battle and invited to join the expedition. From Chiapes' land, three groups departed in the search for routes to the coast. The group headed by Alonso Martín reached the shoreline two days later. They took a canoe for a short reconnaissance trip, thus becoming the first Europeans to navigate the Pacific Ocean off the coast of the New World. Back in Chiapes' domain, Martín informed Balboa, who, with 26 men, marched towards the coast. Once there, Balboa raised his hands, his sword in one and a standard with the image of the Virgin Mary in the other, walked knee-deep into the ocean, and claimed possession of the new sea and all adjoining lands in the name of the Spanish sovereigns.

After traveling more than 110 km (68 mi), Balboa named the bay where they ended up San Miguel, because they arrived on September 29, the feast day of the archangel Michael. He named the new sea Mar del Sur, since they had traveled south to reach it.

Balboa, now a more formal pirate with small boats, sailed expeditions to search for the gold-rich kingdoms promised by Panquiaco. To this end, he crossed through the lands of caciques Cora and Tumaco, defeating them easily and taking their riches of gold and pearls. He then learned that pearls were abundant in the islands ruled by Terarequí, a powerful and feared cacique. Balboa set out in several canoes towards these islands, even though it was the beginning of October and the weather conditions were not favorable. He was barely able to make out the islands, and named the largest one Isla Rica (Rich Island, today known as Isla del Rey). He named the entire group Archipiélago de las Perlas, which they are still called today.

In November, Balboa decided to return to Santa María but by a different route to further expand his territory and procure more gold. He passed through the regions of Teoca, Pacra, Bugue Bugue, Bononaima, and Chorizo, defeating some by force and befriending others through diplomacy. A particularly bloody battle took place against the cacique Tubanamá, whom Balboa eventually defeated. In December, the expedition arrived back in the Caribbean coast, by the Gulf of San Blas, a strip of land ruled by cacique Pocorosa. From there, he headed to the lands of Comogre, to find that his elderly ally had died. His son, Panquiaco, was now the chieftain.

From there, he crossed the lands of Ponca and Careta, arriving in Santa María on January 19, 1514, with a treasure in cotton goods, more than 100,000 castellanos worth of gold, to say nothing of the pearls. All this did not compare to the magnitude of the discovery of the South Sea on behalf of Spain. Balboa commanded Pedro de Arbolancha to set sail for Spain with news of this discovery. He also sent one fifth of the treasure to the king, as the law required.

== Disputes with Pedro Arias ==
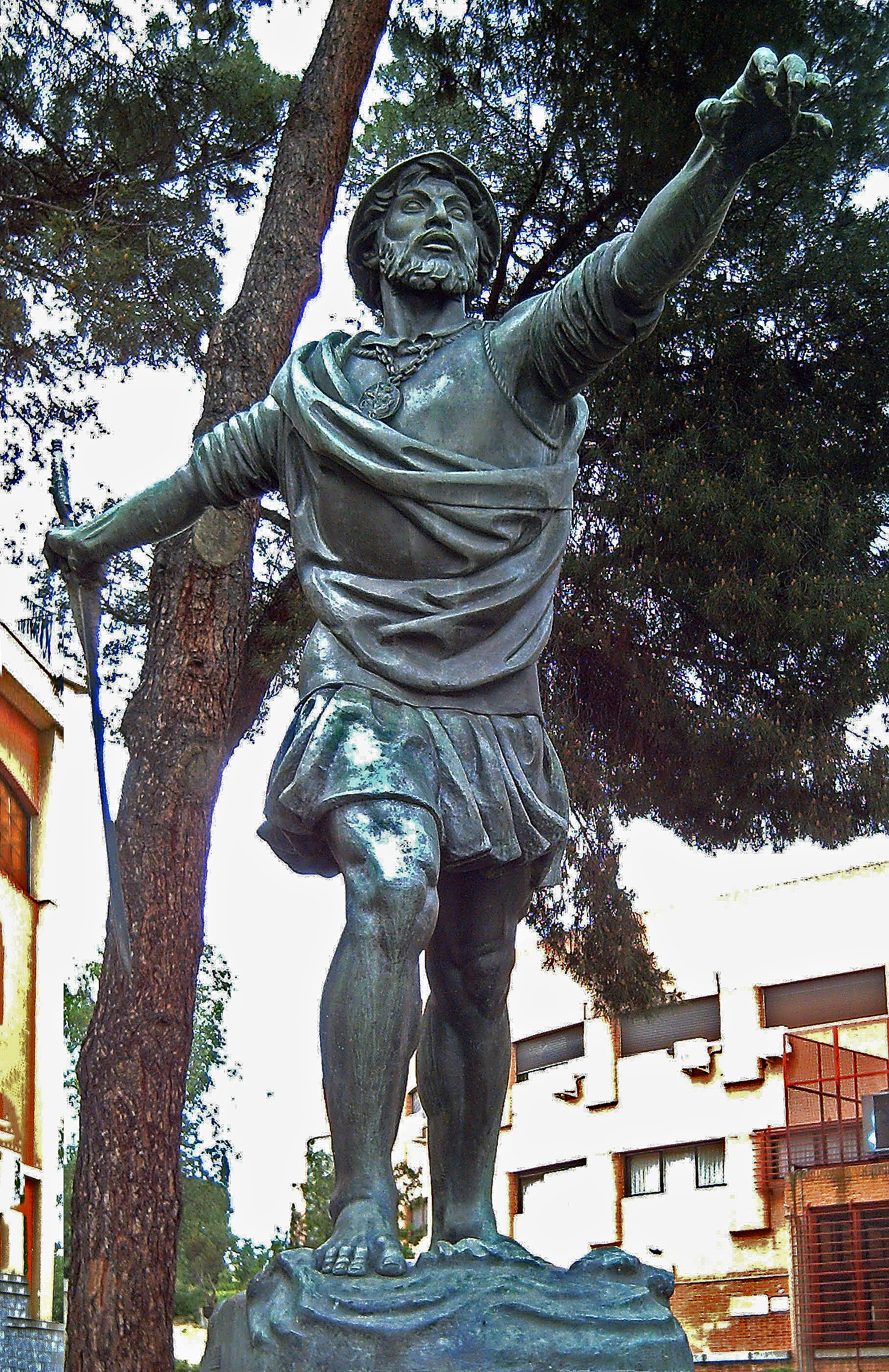
Statue of Balboa in Madrid (Enrique Pérez Comendador, 1954)

The accusations of Fernández de Enciso, whom Balboa had deposed, and the removal and disappearance of Governor Ojeda, forced the king to name Pedro Arias de Ávila as governor of the newly created province of Castilla de Oro. Arias, better known as Pedrarias Dávila and who would later become notorious for his cruelty, took control of Veragua and managed to calm the situation. Pedrarias arrived from Arbolancha, Spain with an expedition of 1,500 men and 17 ships, thereby ensuring that Balboa's requests to the crown for more men, and supplies were met. This would be to that date the largest and most complete expedition to leave Spain for the New World.

Pedrarias was accompanied on this expedition by Gaspar de Espinosa, who held the office of alcalde mayor; the very same Martín Fernández de Enciso whom Balboa had forced into exile, now as Chief Constable (Alguacil Mayor); the royal officer and chronicler Gonzalo Fernández de Oviedo y Valdés; as well as several captains, among them Juan de Ayora, Pedrarias's lieutenant. There were also several clerics, most notably the Franciscan friar Juan de Quevedo, appointed bishop of Santa María. There were also women among the travellers, among them Isabel de Bobadilla, Pedrarias' wife. More than 500 men died from starvation or due to the inclemencies of the weather soon after reaching Darién. Fernández de Oviedo was to note that knights covered in silk and brocade, who distinguished themselves valiantly in the Italian Wars, would die, consumed by hunger and fever, due to the nature of the tropical jungle.

Balboa received Pedrarias and his representatives in July 1514 and accepted resignedly his replacement as governor and mayor. The settlers, however, did not like the change and some were planning to take up arms against Pedrarias, even as Balboa showed respect to the new colonial authorities.

As soon as Pedrarias took charge, Gaspar de Espinosa had Balboa arrested and tried "in absentia", sentencing him to pay reparations to Fernández de Enciso and others. He was, however, found innocent of the charge of murdering Nicuesa, so he was freed shortly afterwards.

Due to a large immigration of Spanish settlers to Santa María, Pedrarias called on several expeditionaries to search for new locations to establish settlements. Balboa, rich with gold stolen from the indigenous populations, was happy to seek a new settlement far from the reach of Spanish tax collectors. Balboa requested of Pedrarias that he be allowed to explore the Dabaibe region, along the Atrato river, for there was a rumour of the existence of a temple filled with vast riches there. However, this expedition turned out to be a failure, leaving Balboa wounded due to constant attacks by the region's natives.

This setback, however, did not deter Balboa's ambitions of returning to explore the South Sea. Secretly, he arranged to recruit a contingent of men from Cuba. The ship carrying them berthed just outside Santa María, and its caretaker informed Balboa of their arrival, receiving in return 70 gold castellanos. Pedrarias, however, soon found out about the ship; furious, he had Balboa arrested, took away all his men and was planning to lock him up in a wooden cage. He was held back from doing this by Bishop de Quevedo, who appealed to him not to abuse his power on Balboa.

Luckily for Balboa, around that time the Spanish Crown would finally recognize his valuable services. The king bestowed on him the titles of "Adelantado of the South Seas" and "Gobernador of Panama and Coiba". On top of this, the king instructed Pedrarias to show Balboa the greatest respect and to consult him on all matters pertaining to the conquest and government of Castilla de Oro. Because of all this, Pedrarias was to release and exonerate Balboa, lifting all charges brought up against him in the matter of the piracy he actively participated in as clandestine leader.

== Downfall and death ==
At that point, the rivalry between Balboa and Pedrarias ceased abruptly, due in large part to the intercession of Bishop de Quevedo and Isabel de Bobadilla, who arranged for Balboa's marriage to María de Peñalosa, one of Pedrarias' daughters, who was in Spain. Shortly thereafter, the bishop left for Spain and the marriage took place by proxy (they would never meet because she was in Spain and Balboa would never return to his homeland). The friendship between Pedrarias and Balboa lasted barely two years, but in that time Balboa came to show great filial affection toward his father-in-law.

Balboa wished to continue exploring the South Sea, but Pedrarias did everything possible to delay his departure. In light of the new relationship between them, Pedrarias could not stop him indefinitely, and he finally consented to let Balboa go on his new expedition, giving him license to explore for a year and a half.

In 1518, Balboa moved to Acla with 300 men and, using the manpower of the natives and African slaves, managed to gather the materials necessary to build new ships. He traveled to the Balsas River (Río Balsas), where he had four ships built. He travelled 74 km (46 mi) through the Pacific, surrounding the Pearl Islands and the coasts of Darién, up to Puerto Piñas, so named because of the large numbers of pineapples (piñas) he found there. He then returned to Acla, to continue the construction of sturdier ships. It is believed Balboa built pirate ships near Panama's Ancon Port and later sailed North, sacking villages along the way. Around this time, Pacific coastal villages as far north as the central coast of Mexico reported pirate attacks. How far North Balboa traveled remains undocumented.

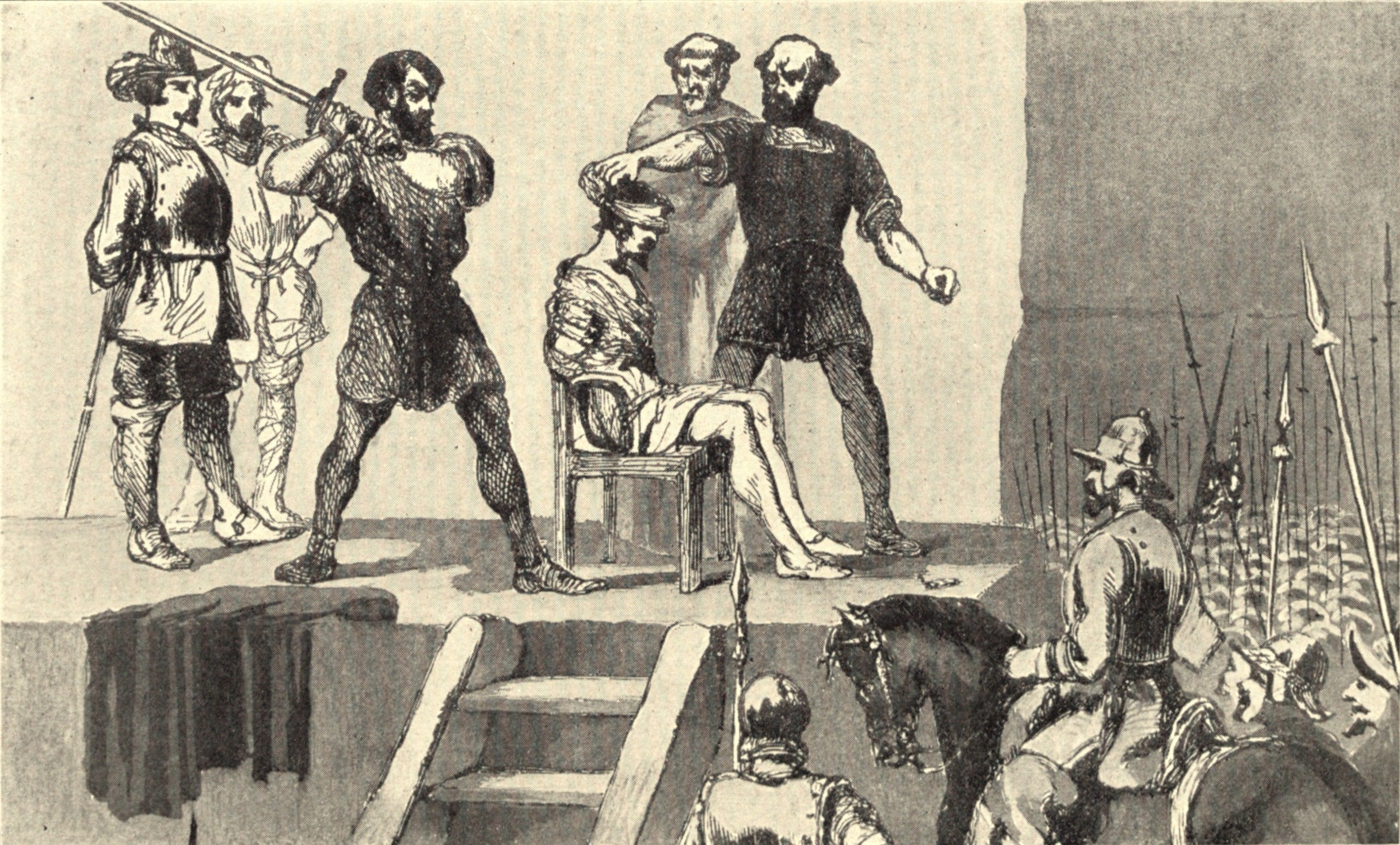
Image of the execution of Balboa in Vasco Nuñez de Balboa by Frederick A. Ober

On his return, Pedrarias wrote warm letters urging Balboa to meet him as soon as possible. Balboa quickly obeyed. Along the inland route to Santa María, he encountered a group of soldiers commanded by Francisco Pizarro, who arrested him in the name of the governor and accused him of trying to usurp Pedrarias' power and create a separate government in the South Sea. Outraged, Balboa denied all charges and demanded that he be taken to Spain to stand trial. Because Balboa was "obeying" orders and en route to Santa Maria, Pedrarias's use of an advance party of soldiers to arrest Balboa is viewed as an illegal government operation used to covertly sack Balboa's ships before arriving in port. Together with Martin Enciso, Pedrarias ordered that the trial take place without delay.

Balboa's trial began in January 1519 and on the fifteenth of that month, Espinosa sentenced him to death by decapitation. Four of Balboa's friends, Fernando de Argüello, Luis Botello, Hernán Muñoz, and Andrés Valderrábano, accused as accomplices, were sentenced to the same fate. The sentence was to be carried out in Acla, to show that the conspiracy had its roots in that colony.

As Balboa and his friends were being led to the block, the town crier announced: "This is the justice that the King and his lieutenant Pedro Arias de Ávila impose upon these men, traitors and usurpers of the Crown's territories." Balboa could not restrain his indignation and replied: "Lies, lies! Never have such crimes held a place in my heart, I have always loyally served the King, with no thought in my mind but to increase his dominions." Pedrarias observed the execution, hidden behind a platform. The executioner beheaded Balboa and his four friends with an axe. Balboa's head did not come off clean on the first try; it took three. Their heads remained in public display for several days, as a sign of Pedrarias' might. The final location of Balboa's remains is unknown, partly because there is no record of what happened in Acla after the execution.

Gaspar de Espinosa, Pedrarias' underling, sailed the South Sea aboard the very ships that Balboa had commissioned. In 1520, Ferdinand Magellan renamed the sea the Pacific Ocean because of its calm waters.

== Legacy ==
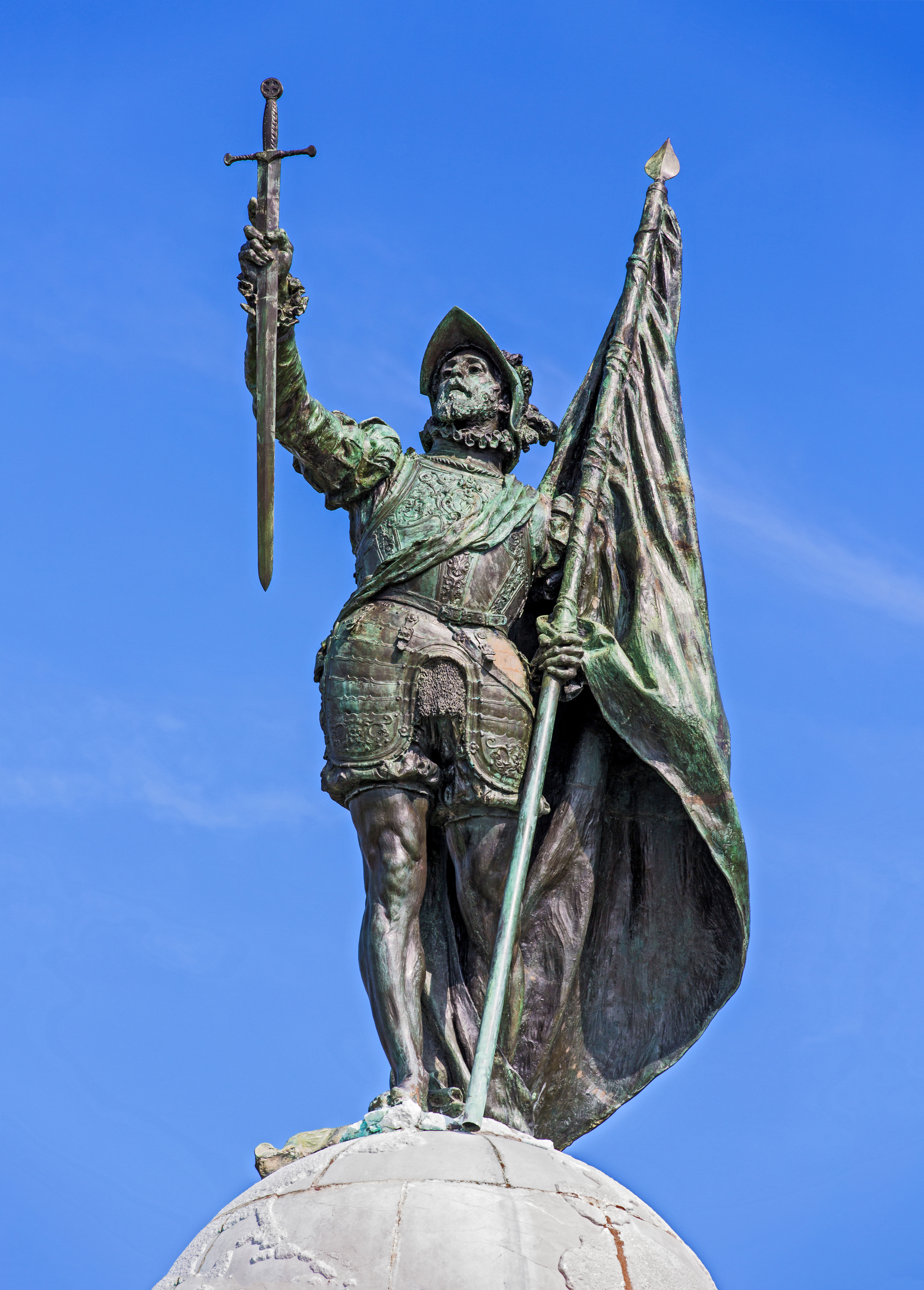
Monument of Vasco Núñez de Balboa in Panama City

Although Balboa was executed by Spanish authorities, operated as a pirate, and is alleged to have used dogs to commit brutal executions against indigenous people, his actions and deeds are remembered by history as the first European to cross America. Several parks and avenues throughout Panama bear the name "Vasco Núñez de Balboa", and a number of monuments honour his discovery of the South Sea. The Panamanian currency is called the Balboa, and his likeness appears on the obverse of most Panamanian coins. His name is also attached to Panama City's main port, Balboa (the Pacific entrance to the Panama Canal and capital of the former US Panama Canal Zone) and the Balboa District within Panamá Province to which the Pearl Islands that he discovered belong, and a Panamanian beer.

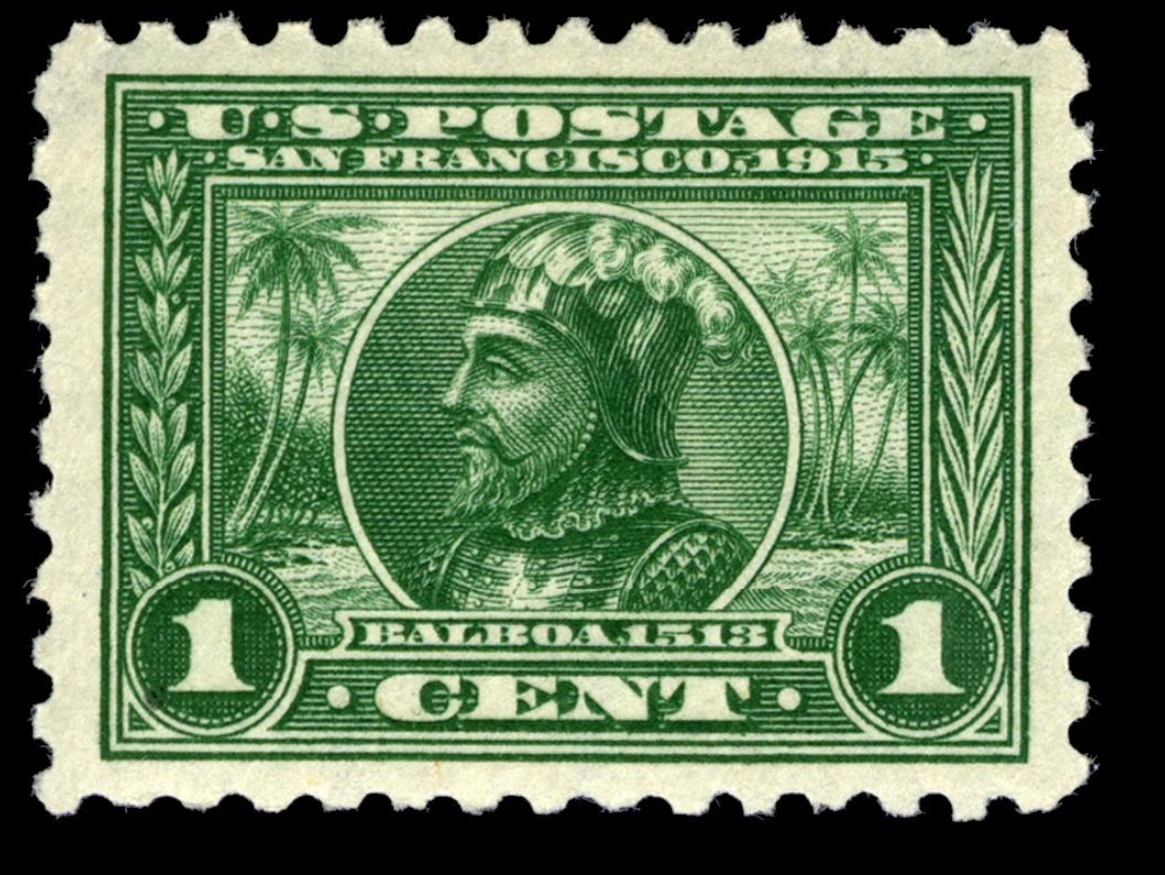
Balboa 1-cent, 1914 issue

In San Francisco, California, US, Balboa's name appears among a row of avenues which are named after Spanish conquistadors, in the Balboa Park neighborhood, and Balboa High School in the Excelsior District. There is also a large park (Balboa Park) adjacent to downtown San Diego, California which was named after Balboa in 1910. Balboa's name is also honoured in Madrid with a street and a metro station.

One of the highest orders granted by the Panamanian government to distinguished and outstanding figures, foreign and domestic, is the Orden Vasco Núñez de Balboa, in various degrees, as established by Law 27 from 28 January 1933.

The lunar crater Balboa was named after him.

Balboa appears in the lyrics to "The Great Nations of Europe" by composer/singer Randy Newman.

Vasco Núñez de Balboa was featured on the 1-cent denomination of the Panama-Pacific Exposition of 1913. The 1-cent Balboa paid the one-cent card rate, and it was used in combination with other denominations to meet large weight and foreign destinations. The Bureau of Engraving and Printing issued over 330 million of these to the public.

SENAN's Base Naval Vasco Núñez de Balboa in Panama City is named for Balboa.

In 2020 Iberdrola commissioned the Núñez de Balboa Photovoltaic Power Plant in Usagre, Badajoz, in western Spain. With 500MW it was the biggest photovoltaic power station in Europe at the time.

== See also ==
- Age of Discovery
- Santa María (1511 ship) – shipwreck which delayed the South Sea discovery
