= Gerónimo de Aguilar =

Friar enslaved by Mayans

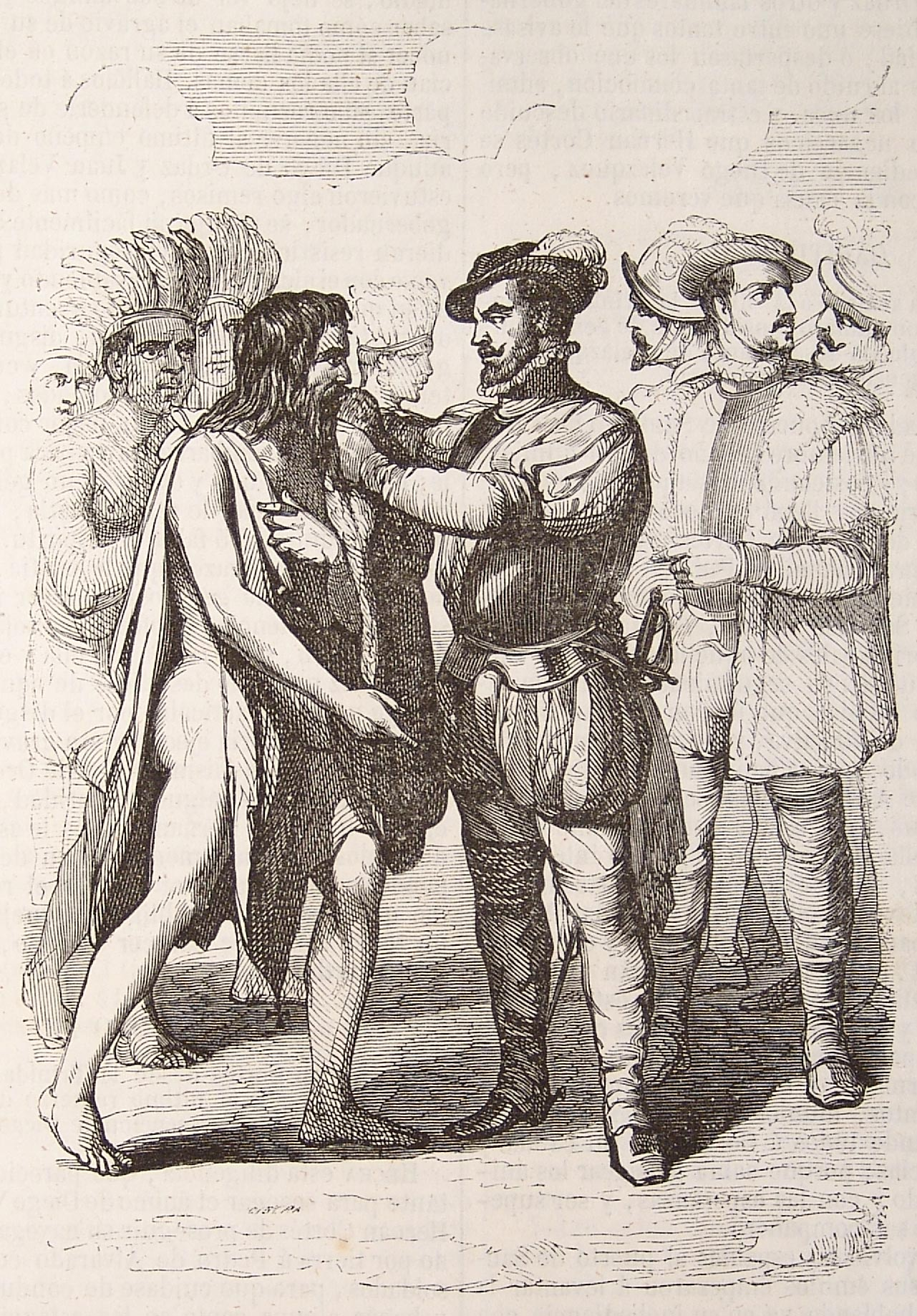
- "Gerónimo de Aguilar is presented to Cortés" from the "History of the Conquest of Mexico" (1851)
- Born: 1489; Écija, Spain
- Died: 1531 (aged 41–42); Pánuco, New Spain
- Occupation: Translator

Gerónimo de Aguilar O.F.M. (1489–1531) was a Franciscan friar born in Écija, Spain. Aguilar was sent to Panama to serve as a missionary. He was later shipwrecked on the Yucatán Peninsula in 1511 and captured by the Maya, who enslaved him and the other survivors of the shipwreck. In 1519 Hernán Cortés rescued Aguilar and engaged him as a translator during the Spanish conquest of the Aztec Empire.

== Life and career ==
Aguilar wound up at the colony of Santa María la Antigua del Darién, founded in Panama in 1510. Because of ongoing disputes and divisions among the leaders of the colony, in 1511 Aguilar left Panama on the caravel Santa María de la Barca sailing to Santo Domingo. He took with him legal documents for a case against the other faction of the Panamanian colony, as well as a large sum of gold for the proceedings. The ship sailed with a complement of sixteen men and two women. They were shipwrecked near the Yucatán Peninsula after hitting a sandbar. The crew and passengers got into a small boat, hoping to reach Cuba or Jamaica, but strong currents brought them in their ship's boat to the coast of the modern-day Mexican state of Quintana Roo.

Aguilar and 11 or 12 other survivors were captured by the local Maya and scheduled to be sacrificed to Maya gods. Valdivia and four others met this fate. Others died of disease and, in the case of the women, overwork as slaves. Aguilar and Gonzalo Guerrero (a sailor from Palos de la Frontera in Spain) managed to escape, later to be taken as slaves by another Maya chief named Xamanzana who was hostile to the first tribe. Here he and Guerrero were able to learn the language of their captors. Aguilar lived as a slave during his eight years with the Maya. His continued fidelity to his religious vows led him to refuse the offers of women made to him by the chief. Guerrero became a war chief for Nachan Kaan, Lord of Chektumal, married a rich Maya woman and fathered the first mestizo children of Mexico.

Hernán Cortés landed on Yucatán in 1519. He heard word of bearded men among a neighboring tribe. Suspecting that they were fellow Spaniards, he sent word to them. Eventually Aguilar reached them and joined the expedition. He demonstrated his fidelity to his faith by correctly identifying the day of week, from a steadfast following of his breviary, which he had been able to keep through all the years of his captivity. Speaking both Maya and Spanish, he and La Malinche, who could speak Maya and Nahuatl, translated for Cortés during the conquest of the Aztec Empire. His usefulness in that capacity ended once La Malinche had learned Spanish and was able to translate directly from Nahuatl. At this point, La Malinche became the primary interpreter for Hernán Cortés.

After the conquest, Aguilar became a vecino (resident) of Mexico City. For his contributions, he was awarded two encomiendas by Alonso de Estrada in 1526. He died in 1531 without heirs and his encomiendas reverted to the Crown. His house in Mexico City later became the site of the first printing press to operate in the New World.

== See also ==
- Hernán Cortés
- Franciscans
- Gonzalo Guerrero
- La Malinche
- Spanish conquest of the Aztec Empire
- Spanish conquest of Yucatán#First encounters: 1502 and 1511
