= Santa María la Antigua del Darién =

Former Spanish colonial settlement in present-day Colombia

- Former subdivision of the Spanish Empire
- 1510–1524
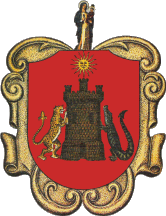
- Flag Coat of arms

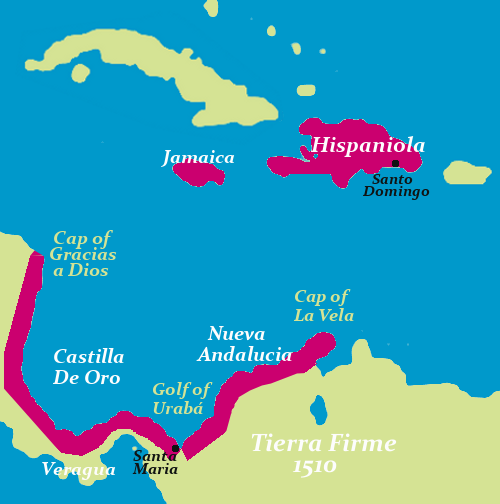
- Santa María was on the Isthmus of Panama
- Capital: Santa María la Antigua del Darién
- Area
  - Coordinates: 8°12′31″N 77°02′14″W
  - Type: Colonial administration
- History
  - Established: 1510
  - Disestablished: 1524
- Today part of: Colombia

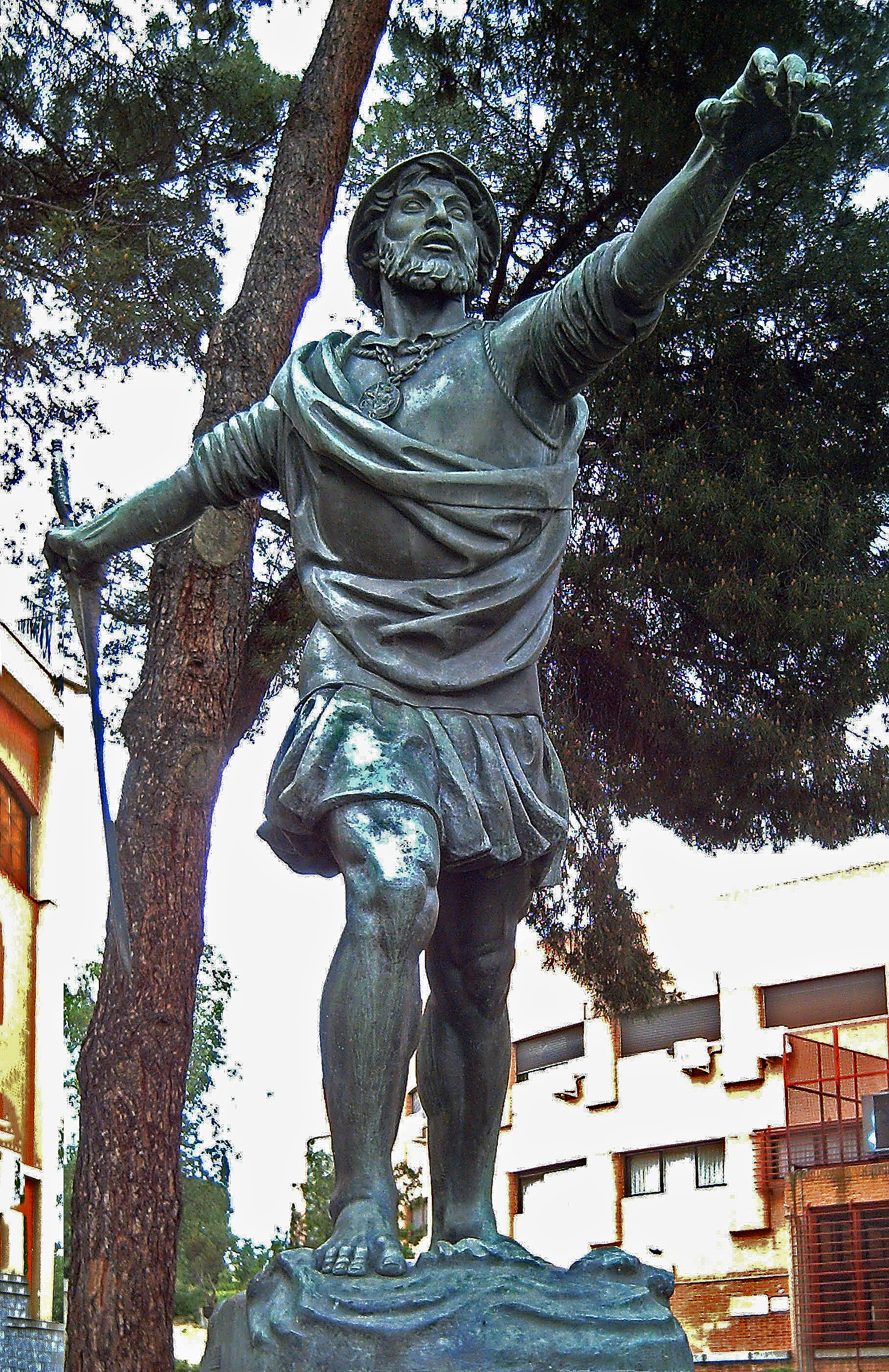
Monument to Vasco Núñez de Balboa in Madrid, founder of Santa María la Antigua del Darién

Santa María la Antigua del Darién—rendered as Dariena in the Latin of De Orbe Novo—was a Spanish colonial town founded in 1510 by Vasco Núñez de Balboa. Located in present-day Colombia approximately 40 miles (64 km) south of Acandí, within the municipality of Unguía in the Chocó Department, it was the first permanent European settlement on the mainland of the Americas and served as the first capital of Castilla del Oro. The settlement was abandoned in 1524 after the capital was transferred to the newly founded Panama City and was subsequently attacked and burned by indigenous peoples.

== Background ==
=== Earlier colonization attempts ===
In 1508, the Spanish Crown decided to colonize the mainland of the Americas, designating the region extending from Cabo Gracias a Dios in Central America to Cabo de la Vela in present-day Venezuela. This territory was divided into two provinces: Nueva Andalucía and Castilla del Oro.

The first attempt at colonization on the mainland came when Alonso de Ojeda, together with approximately 70 men, founded the settlement of San Sebastián de Urabá in Nueva Andalucía in 1509, near the location where Cartagena de Indias would later be built. The settlers encountered fierce resistance from the local indigenous peoples, who used poisoned arrows, and Ojeda himself was wounded. After Ojeda departed for Hispaniola, he left the colony under the supervision of Francisco Pizarro, who would later conquer the Inca Empire.

=== Founding expedition ===
In 1510, Martín Fernández de Enciso organized an expedition to bring reinforcements to the beleaguered settlement of San Sebastián. Vasco Núñez de Balboa, seeking to escape his creditors in Santo Domingo, stowed away on one of Enciso's ships, reportedly hiding inside a barrel with his dog Leoncico. When discovered, Balboa was initially threatened with abandonment on an uninhabited island, but Enciso reconsidered after recognizing that Balboa's previous experience in the region during the 1500–1501 Rodrigo de Bastidas expedition could prove valuable.

Upon arriving at San Sebastián, the expedition found the settlement largely destroyed and abandoned, with hostile indigenous groups still controlling the area. Balboa suggested relocating across the Gulf of Urabá to the Darién region, which he remembered from his earlier voyage as having more fertile soil and less warlike inhabitants who did not use poisoned arrows.

== Foundation ==
=== Battle against the Cueva ===
The expedition crossed to the western shore of the Gulf of Urabá and arrived at a Cueva village located approximately 6 kilometers upriver from the coast along what the Spanish called the Río Darién (modern Tanela River). The village was ruled by a cacique named Cémaco, who commanded approximately 500 warriors.

Facing this substantial force, the Spanish made a vow to the Virgen de la Antigua, a greatly venerated image in the Seville Cathedral, promising to name their settlement after her if they prevailed in battle. The ensuing conflict proved difficult for both sides, but the Spanish ultimately emerged victorious. Cémaco and his warriors fled into the jungle, and the Spanish plundered the village, gathering a substantial quantity of gold ornaments.

=== Establishment of the settlement ===
In September 1510, Balboa fulfilled his vow by founding the settlement and naming it Santa María la Antigua del Darién after the Virgin of Seville. This made it the first permanent European settlement on the mainland of the Americas—a settlement established by Alonso de Ojeda the previous year at San Sebastián de Urabá having already been abandoned.

The victory and the founding of Santa María earned Balboa considerable respect among his companions. The colonists soon deposed Enciso, whom many found difficult and unpopular, and elected a town council (cabildo) with Balboa as one of its two magistrates (alcaldes). When Diego de Nicuesa, the appointed governor of Castilla de Oro, arrived to assert his authority, the settlers rejected him and reportedly cast him adrift in an unseaworthy vessel, after which he disappeared at sea.

== Administration ==
=== Under Balboa (1510–1514) ===
In December 1511, King Ferdinand II of Aragon sent orders naming Balboa interim governor and captain general of Darién, legitimizing his de facto leadership. During this period, Balboa organized a series of expeditions into the surrounding indigenous territories in search of gold and slaves. His policy toward the indigenous peoples combined barter, the strategic use of force (including torture to extract information), and a divide-and-conquer strategy of forming alliances with certain groups against others.

Balboa established working relationships with several indigenous leaders, including the caciques Careta and Comogre. Through these alliances, he learned of the existence of a great sea to the south and a kingdom rich in gold. In 1511, Balboa dispatched the first shipment of gold from mainland America to Spain, comprising the royal quinto (one-fifth share) alongside additional tribute.

=== Arrival of Pedrarias (1514) ===
The Spanish Crown, impressed by reports of the region's potential but concerned about Balboa's unauthorized assumption of power, dispatched a large expedition under Pedro Arias Dávila (known as Pedrarias). This fleet of 22 vessels carrying approximately 1,500 to 2,000 colonists—including soldiers, artisans, doctors, and some women—arrived at Santa María in June 1514. It was one of the largest Spanish expeditions to the mainland at that time.

The sudden influx of settlers overwhelmed Santa María's resources. The town, which had been home to approximately 500 Spaniards and 1,500 indigenous servants (naborías) before Pedrarias's arrival, could not adequately accommodate the newcomers. Food shortages and disease quickly took hold, and many of the new arrivals died within weeks.

=== Conflict between Balboa and Pedrarias ===
Relations between Balboa and Pedrarias were initially cordial, though the new governor harbored suspicions about his popular predecessor. Juan de Quevedo, the newly appointed bishop, attempted to ease tensions by arranging a betrothal between Balboa and Pedrarias's daughter María, who remained in a convent in Seville.

Despite this arrangement, the rivalry between the two men intensified. Pedrarias's lieutenants conducted brutal expeditions (entradas) that undid much of the goodwill Balboa had established with indigenous communities. Meanwhile, Balboa continued to plan ambitious ventures, including the construction of ships to explore the Pacific coast.

== Discovery of the Pacific Ocean ==
On September 1, 1513, Balboa departed from Santa María with 190 Spaniards, including Francisco Pizarro as his second-in-command, along with indigenous guides and war dogs. The expedition crossed the Isthmus of Panama, traversing territories inhabited by Cueva-speaking peoples. On September 25 (or possibly September 27), 1513, Balboa became the first European to sight the Pacific Ocean from the Americas, viewing it from a mountain peak.

Four days later, on September 29, the expedition reached the shores of the ocean, which Balboa named the "South Sea" (Mar del Sur). He waded into the water and formally claimed the ocean and all adjoining lands for the Spanish Crown. This discovery validated the strategic importance of the isthmus as a transit corridor and laid the groundwork for subsequent Spanish ventures linking Atlantic and Pacific commerce.

== Ecclesiastical significance ==
=== First mainland diocese ===
On August 28, 1513, Pope Leo X, at the request of King Ferdinand, established the Diocese of Santa María de La Antigua del Darién, making it the first Roman Catholic diocese on the mainland of the Americas. The diocese was a suffragan see of the Archdiocese of Seville.

=== Bishop Juan de Quevedo ===
Juan de Quevedo (c. 1450–1519), a Franciscan friar from Cantabria, was appointed as the first bishop on September 9, 1513, and was consecrated in January 1514 by Diego de Deza, Archbishop of Seville. Quevedo arrived at Santa María with Pedrarias's expedition later that year.

Quevedo frequently clashed with Pedrarias over the treatment of indigenous peoples and the governor's harsh administration. He strongly protested against the cruelties committed by Spanish officers and opposed the execution of Balboa. In 1518, Quevedo returned to Spain and presented two memorials to King Charles V—one criticizing Pedrarias and another advocating for restrictions on governors' powers to better protect indigenous peoples. Quevedo died in Barcelona on December 24, 1519.

The diocese was renamed the Diocese of Panamá on December 7, 1520, after the episcopal see was transferred to Panama City, and was eventually elevated to an archdiocese in 1925. The modern Metropolitan Cathedral of Panama considers itself the heir to the cathedral originally established at Santa María.

== Urban development ==
=== Layout and infrastructure ===
At its height around 1515, Santa María la Antigua del Darién officially received city status, including a coat of arms. According to the chronicler Gonzalo Fernández de Oviedo y Valdés, who served as mayor of the city, the settlement had more than 100 houses when Pedrarias arrived in 1514. Another chronicler, Pascual de Andagoya, described approximately 200 houses of indigenous style inhabited by the original Spanish settlers and their indigenous servants.

The city eventually grew to include a cathedral church, a second church, a hospital, a main plaza (Plaza Mayor), a provisions market (plaza de abastos), a trading house (Casa de la Contratación), a Franciscan monastery, a prison, a foundry (herrería), and residential buildings for officials. Archaeological evidence suggests the city reached a population of approximately 5,000 inhabitants, including both Spaniards and indigenous peoples.

=== Two distinct settlements ===
Archaeological investigations have revealed that Santa María was actually composed of two distinct sections: the original Cueva village called Darién, which was occupied by the Spanish in 1510, and a new Spanish settlement founded by Pedrarias in 1514 following European urban planning principles. The two settlements were separated by a branch of the Darién River. The total area of dispersal of archaeological material covers approximately 18 hectares.

== Indigenous peoples ==
=== The Cueva ===
The indigenous inhabitants of the Darién region encountered by the Spanish were the Cueva people, who spoke the Cueva language, which may have belonged to either the Chibchan or Chocoan language family. The Cueva lived in small villages along river terraces and the coast, practicing slash-and-burn agriculture with crops including maize, manioc, and beans. They also engaged in fishing, hunting, and long-distance trade.

The Cueva were organized into cacicazgos (chiefdoms) under rulers known as caciques. Notable caciques mentioned in Spanish chronicles include Cémaco (whose village became the site of Santa María), Careta, Comogre, and Ponca. Some caciques initially allied with the Spanish, providing food and intelligence in exchange for protection against rival groups, while others remained hostile.

=== Decline of the Cueva ===
The Cueva population suffered catastrophic decline following Spanish contact due to violence, enslavement, epidemic diseases, and displacement. By the mid-16th century, the Cueva had largely disappeared as a distinct people. Surviving groups either assimilated with other indigenous peoples, such as the Guna (Kuna), or perished. The Emberá and Wounaan peoples subsequently migrated into parts of the former Cueva territory from the Chocó region to the south.

== Decline and abandonment ==
=== Factors contributing to decline ===
Several factors contributed to Santa María's decline. The unhealthy tropical environment of the Gulf of Urabá, with its swamps and endemic fevers, took a heavy toll on the colonists. Governor Pedrarias's aggressive policies toward indigenous peoples undermined the alliances Balboa had cultivated, leading to increased hostility and attacks on Spanish supply lines. The diminishing returns from gold panning and coerced indigenous labor caused settler unrest.

Following Balboa's execution in January 1519—ordered by Pedrarias on charges of treason—indigenous resistance in the region intensified. Groups such as the Cueva, who had previously maintained uneasy coexistence with the Spanish under Balboa, now turned openly hostile under Pedrarias's brutal administration.

=== Transfer of capital ===
On August 15, 1519, Pedrarias founded Panama City on the Pacific coast, which offered a more favorable climate and strategic access to both oceans. The governor then began actively encouraging settlers to relocate from Santa María to the new capital and other settlements such as Acla and Nombre de Dios.

Gonzalo Fernández de Oviedo recorded the final years of Santa María, describing how the population gradually diminished between 1521 and 1523 as settlers departed: "every day the vecinos left, because the governor promised and gave them indios de repartimiento [indigenous laborers] and other advantages to those that left the city."

=== Destruction ===
Santa María la Antigua del Darién was formally abandoned in 1524. That same year, indigenous peoples attacked the nearly deserted settlement and burned it. Archaeological investigations have confirmed evidence of this fire in the form of burned remains at the site.

== Legacy ==
=== Historical significance ===
Santa María la Antigua del Darién holds a unique place in history as the first permanent European settlement on the mainland of the Americas and the launching point for major expeditions of exploration and conquest. From this base, Balboa crossed the isthmus to discover the Pacific Ocean. Francisco Pizarro, who served under Balboa at Santa María, later used knowledge gained during his time in Darién to organize his conquest of the Inca Empire.

The settlement also established important precedents for Spanish colonial administration, including the creation of the first mainland diocese and the development of urban planning approaches that would be refined in subsequent colonial cities.

=== Name and devotion ===
The town's naming after the Virgen de la Antigua of Seville Cathedral reflects the important role of Marian devotion among Spanish explorers and colonists. The Virgin of the Antigua, a 14th-century mural painting in the cathedral, was particularly venerated by seafarers departing from Seville for the Americas. The chapel housing the image in Seville Cathedral is today decorated with the flags of South American nations to commemorate this shared devotion.

== Archaeological investigations ==
=== Early expeditions ===
The precise location of Santa María remained uncertain for centuries. Early archaeological work included an expedition sponsored by King Leopold III of Belgium in 1956, which produced limited scientific documentation; an expedition by the Universidad Santa María la Antigua of Panama in 1966; and important foundational research by Graciliano Arcila Vélez published in 1986.

A project by the Universidad Nacional de Colombia between 2006 and 2008 opened relationships with local communities and advanced understanding of the site, though the precise city limits remained unidentified.

=== ICANH project (2013–present) ===
In 2013, the Colombian Institute of Anthropology and History (ICANH) initiated a comprehensive Management and Protection Plan for the site under the direction of archaeologist Alberto Sarcina. This multidisciplinary project has employed systematic test-pit surveys, satellite imagery analysis, soil studies, geophysical prospection using ground-penetrating radar, and underwater surveys.

The investigations have definitively established the city's location and boundaries, identified the adjacent Cueva village, and distinguished the two settlement phases (the original indigenous village occupied in 1510 and the new settlement founded by Pedrarias in 1514). Excavations have uncovered artifacts including lead projectiles, cannon balls, shackles, coins, indigenous figurines, nose ornaments, grinding stones, fishing weights, textile stamps, and coral pieces.

=== Archaeological park and museum ===
An archaeological park and community museum have been established at the site in the village of Santuario, corregimiento of Tanela, municipality of Unguía. The museum, housed in a traditional thatched-roof building constructed by students from Bogotá's School Workshop (Escuela Taller), displays artifacts from the excavations and provides educational programming for local residents and visitors. The project has been notable for its community-based approach, involving indigenous, Afro-Colombian, and peasant women from the region in excavation work.

== Primary sources ==
The principal historical sources for Santa María la Antigua del Darién include:

- Gonzalo Fernández de Oviedo y Valdés – Historia general y natural de las Indias (1535 and later volumes): Oviedo arrived at Santa María with Pedrarias's expedition in 1514 and later served as the city's mayor. His chronicle provides detailed eyewitness accounts of the settlement's layout, population, and final years.
- Peter Martyr d'Anghiera – De Orbe Novo (Decades of the New World, 1511–1530): Written in Latin, this work provides contemporary accounts of Spanish exploration, including the founding and events at Darién.
- Pascual de Andagoya – Relación y Documentos: Andagoya arrived with Pedrarias's expedition and later explored southward toward Peru. His account provides descriptions of the settlement and its indigenous inhabitants.

== See also ==
- Vasco Núñez de Balboa
- Pedro Arias Dávila
- Castilla del Oro
- Spanish colonization of the Americas
- Cueva people
- Darién Province
- Panama City
- Darién scheme – Later Scottish colonial attempt in the region (1698–1700)
