= Diego de Nicuesa =

Spanish conquistador and royal governor of Panama

- Died: 1511; Santa María la Antigua del Darién, Panama (present-day Colombia)
- Occupations: Conquistador and explorer
- Known for: Mysterious disappearance

Diego de Nicuesa (Spanish: [ˈdjeɣo ðe niˈkwesa]; died 1511) was a Spanish conquistador and explorer. He was the first governor of Veragua, a region stretching from Panama to northern Nicaragua, during the Spanish colonial period.

== Background ==
Diego arrived at Santo Domingo in April 1502, with Nicolás de Ovando's flotilla.

In 1506, Nicuesa was given the job of governing Costa Rica, but ran aground off the coast of Panama. He made his way north overland, against resistance from the native population. The combination of guerrilla warfare and tropical disease killed half his expedition before he gave up.

In 1508, Diego de Nicuesa received a land grant at Veragua from Ferdinand II of Aragon, the Spanish monarch. He became founder and governor of Castilla de Oro, in what is now Panama, one of the first two Spanish settlements on the American mainland.

== Final events and disappearance ==
In 1510 he founded the colony of Nombre de Dios. The colony suffered from hunger, hostile natives, and illness, and was ultimately saved by the arrival of Colmenares, a companion who was coming after with supplies. The party abandoned the colony to sail to the more prosperous colony of Santa María la Antigua del Darién, which had been established by the conquistador Vasco Núñez de Balboa without the knowledge of Nicuesa. Informed by Colmenares of the new colony established within the borders of his territory, he headed to the colony to punish the colonists and take possession of it. But the colonists of Santa Maria were warned of the governor's intent and denied him entry. While most of Nicuesa's men were granted the right to stay in Balboa's colony, Nicuesa and 17 loyal followers were put out to sea. Nicuesa headed for the Santo Domingo, but the ship disappeared and he was never seen again.

== See also ==
- List of people who disappeared mysteriously at sea
- Santa María de la Barca – ship from Balboa's colony that was similarly lost
