= Beer in Panama =

Panama produces three brands of rum and a similar liquor known as Seco Herrerano, but beer is also quite popular. There are multiple brands produced by six companies.

== List of beers of Panama ==
=== Animal Brew ===
Small independent brewpub in El Cangrejo neighborhood

- Skaters - IPA network of mango and raspberries
- Quimera - Mocha Mint Stout
- Summer Time - Pineapple Blonde Ale
- Bloodshed - Hardcore Red Ale
- SPV - Golden IPA
- Villalobos - Brown Ale
- THC - Black IPA
- Punto Rojo - Belgian Red IPA
- Tia Yeya - Session IPA
- Night & Fun - Strawberry Blonde Ale
- Anarquia - Stout Red Fruits
- La Blanca - White IPA
- Santa Catalina Piñas - Wheat Beer
- Antisociales - Pale Ale
- Villalovers - Brown Ale

=== Casa Bruja ===
Independent craft brewery established in Costa Del Este Industrial Park, Panama City, in December 2013, with a second taproom in the old city (Casa Bruja Casco Antiguo).

- Chivoperro
- Talingo
- Sandokan
- Fula
- Sir Francis
- Talias
- Tulivieja
- Tres Tristes Tigres

– Source:

=== Cervecería Barú-Panama ===
- Cristal
- Panama

A popular beer, the Panama brand is also the strongest marketer, with T-shirts and other merchandise bearing its name seen around the Americas. It is distributed in some parts of the world by Royal Imports, LLC.

- Soberana
- other brands

on a contract basis, including Heineken, Guinness, Warsteiner, Tecate, and as of recently, Budweiser.

– Source:

=== Cervecería Clandestina ===
- Doppelbock

a traditional German style, a Lager with a very Panamanian touch: organic cacao from the tropical islands of Bocas del Toro, and coffee from the mountains of Chiriquí. With a brilliant chocolate color, it has an aroma with malted notes, caramel fruit, cacao and coffee. Has a malty flavor with suite coffee, coco and dried fruit, and a well-balanced bitterness. It is silky with a strong body and a dry finish.

- Intriga

a refreshing Witbier. It has a light golden color and a creamy, persistent foam. it has aromas of banana and citrus, and in its flavors predominate citrus notes and a subtle sweetness, with an easy ending. 5.2% ABV, 13 IBU

- Ley Seca

a Pale Ale, with hints of the Strong Bitter English style. It has a deep amber color and a dense and persistent white foam. Its aroma and flavor are enhanced by its malt character and caramel and toffee notes, and a light bitterness with citric and floral hints. A very drinkable beer with intense flavor. 5.6% ABV, 28 IBU

- Nomada

A craft Pilsner. With a brilliant golden color and lightly turbid as it is not filtered, nor do they use additives to clarify the beer. It has an intense satisfying flavor. 5.0% ABV, 18 IBU.

– Source:

=== Cervecería Central ===
- Guachiman
- Lager Tija
- River Down
- Veranera
- Bocas Town

– Source:

=== Cervecería Nacional ===
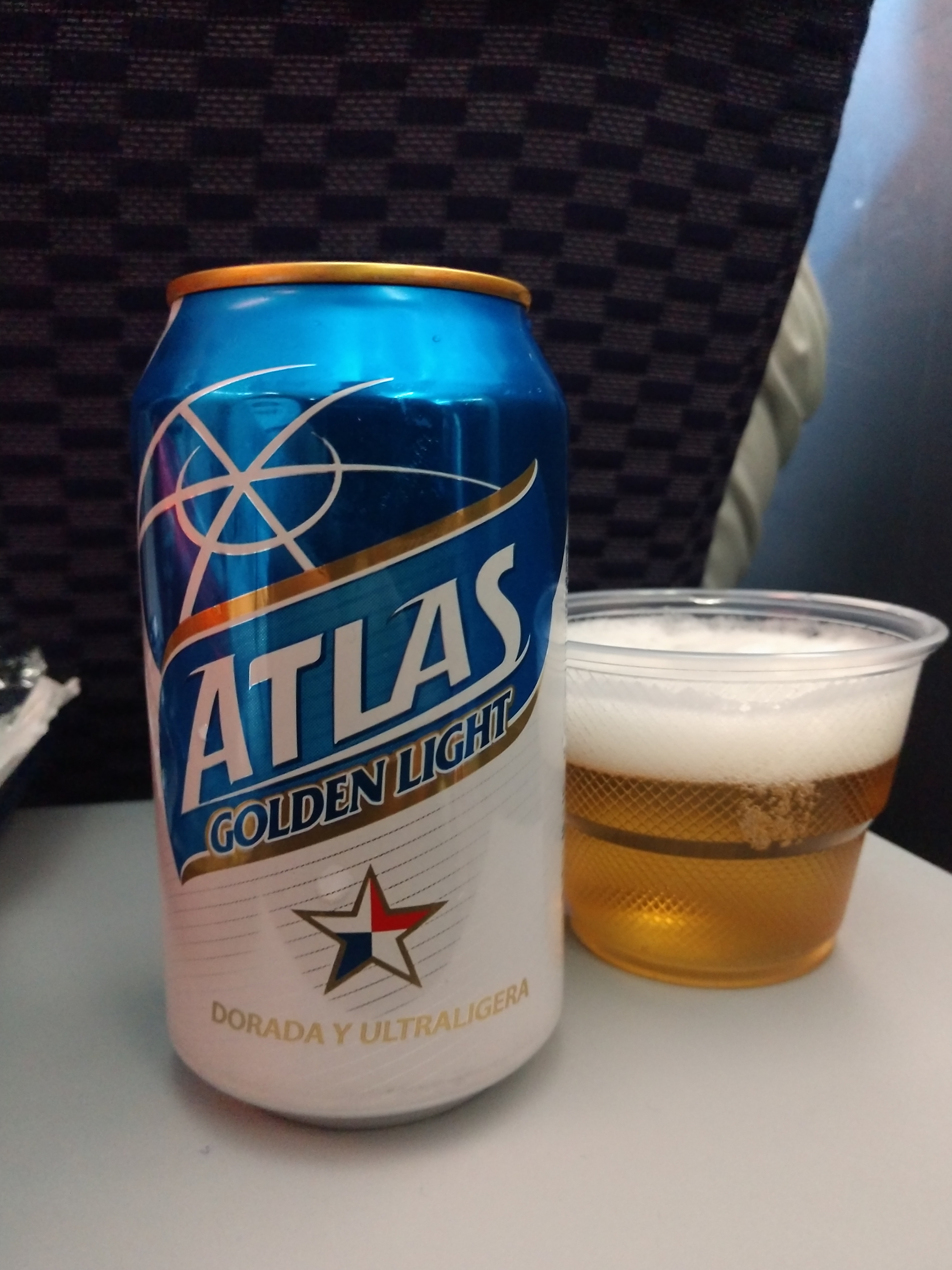
A can of Atlas beer.

Owned by Grupo Bavaria of Colombia, which is in turn now owned by SABMiller.

- Atlas

A light beer, this is one of the two most popular, and is considered very similar to beers in the United States, often compared to Bud Light or Miller Light in reviews. It is the most popular beer in Panama.

- Atlas Golden Light

It's the same beer as Atlas, but lighter.

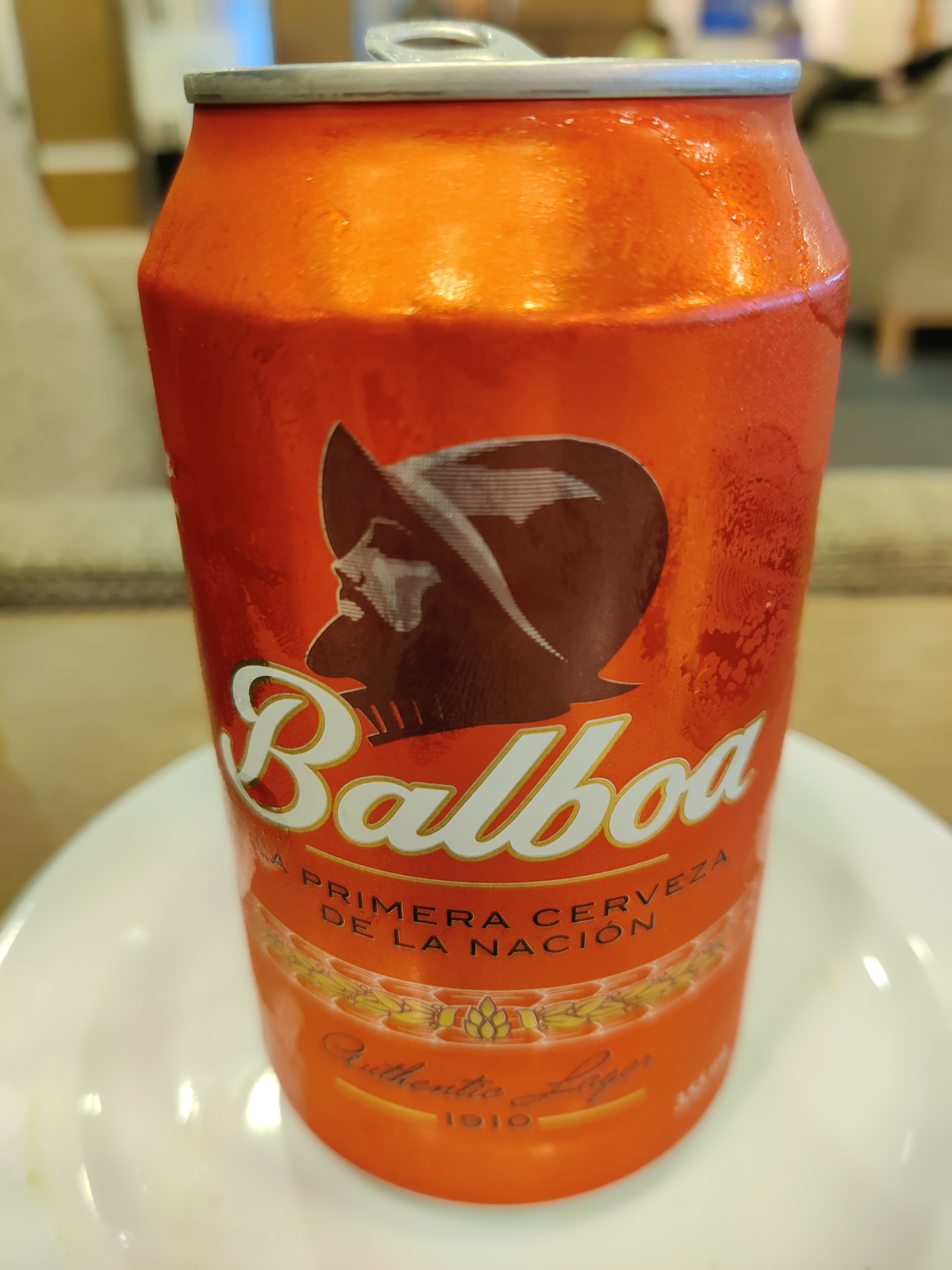
Balboa beer, named after Vasco Núñez de Balboa, the Spanish explorer of Panama.

- Balboa

Compared both to darker North American brands, and to stout European varieties. Like many things in Panama, it is named after conquistador Vasco Núñez de Balboa.

- Balboa Ice

– Source:

=== La Rana Dorada ===
Small independent brewery

- Blanche/Belga
- Pale Ale
- Porte
- Premium Pils

– Source:

=== 2 Oceans Brewing ===
Independent craft brewery from Panama City, Panama.

- Tropty

India Pale Ale (5.15% ABV, 75 IBU) - a dry-hopped IPA made with various citric hops. It is a refreshing and juicy IPA inspired from the New England IPA style.

- Switch

Blonde Ale (5.00% ABV, 20 IBU) - Switch is a light-bodied aromatic ale inspired from the refreshing Pilsner style and fermented with ale yeast.

- Invasion

American Pale Ale (5.00% ABV, 33 IBU) - Invasion is a traditional American Pale Ale focused on heavy notes of caramel with a dry finish.

- Witnic

Belgian Witbier (5.00% ABV, 17 IBU) - Witnic is a traditional Belgian wit, a traditional style that combines wheat, orange peel and coriander.

== Controversies ==
In one of many corporate scandals of businesses financing Colombian paramilitaries, allegations surround Cervecería Nacional for having union workers killed by the armed right-wing groups Parent of Panama's biggest beer company alleged to have financed paramilitaries that attacked Panama.

== See also ==
- Beer and breweries by region
