= Pedro de los Ríos y Gutiérrez de Aguayo =

Spanish governor of Castilla del Oro and Nicaragua

Pedro de los Ríos y Gutiérrez de Aguayo (c. 1496 - November 1549) was a Spanish colonial administrator who succeeded Pedrarias Dávila as governor of Castilla del Oro (1526–1529) and of Nicaragua (1526–1527). Born in Córdoba, Spain, his parents were Diego Gutiérrez de los Ríos y González de Hoces and Elvira Gutiérrez de Aguayo y López de Montemayor.

Pedro de los Ríos was named governor of Castilla del Oro in May 1526 and took charge of the post in July of the same year. He later moved to Nicaragua and earned the trust of its administrators who also bestowed him the governorship. However, the governor of Honduras Diego López de Salcedo y Rodríguez soon arrived in León, Nicaragua, and obliged Ríos to abandon the post and return to Castilla del Oro.

After several years of mishandling the governorship of Castilla del Oro, he was removed from the post and succeeded by Antonio de la Gama in August 1529. His duties done in Central America, he decided to join Francisco Pizarro in the newly discovered territory of Peru. Once there, he arrived in the Incan capital of Cuzco and was registered among its first Spanish settlers. Ríos sided with Pizarro's forces against initial unsuccessful attempts by the Spanish Crown to regain Peru. He participated in the Battle of Chupas (1542) and several years later died in the Battle of Huarina, near Lake Titicaca on October 27, 1547.
