= Pedro Arias Dávila =

Royal Governor of Panama

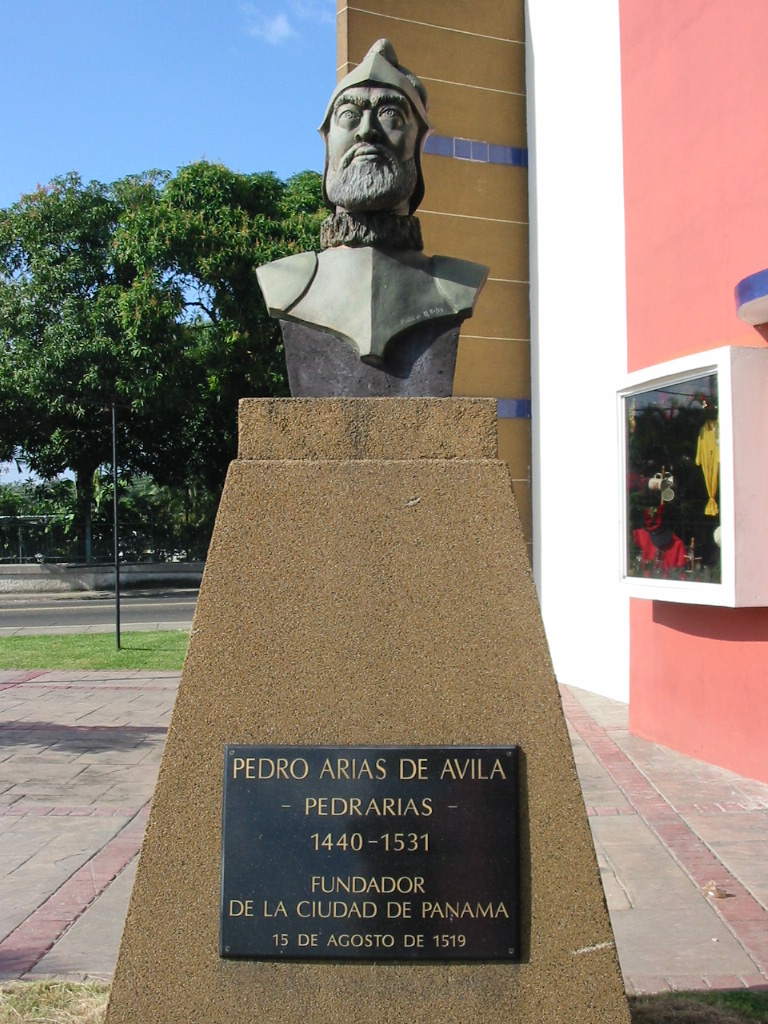

1st Governor of Castilla del Oro
- In office 1513 / July 1514 – 1526
- Monarchs: Joanna I / Charles I
- Preceded by: Vasco Nuñez de Balboa
- Succeeded by: Pedro de los Ríos y Gutiérrez de Aguayo

Royal Governor of Nicaragua
- In office 1528–1531
- Monarch: Charles I
- Preceded by: Diego Gutiérrez de los Ríos y Aguayo
- Succeeded by: Pedro Ramírez de Quiñones

Personal details
- Born: c. 1440 Segovia, Crown of Castile
- Died: 6 March 1531 León Viejo, Nicaragua Province, Spanish Empire
- Spouse: María de Peñalosa y Bobadilla
- Children: Diego Arias Dávila y Bobadilla; Pedro Arias Dávila y Bobadilla; Elvira de Bobadilla; María Arias de Peñalosa; Isabel Arias Dávila y Bobadilla
- Profession: Military, explorer, conquistador, and governor
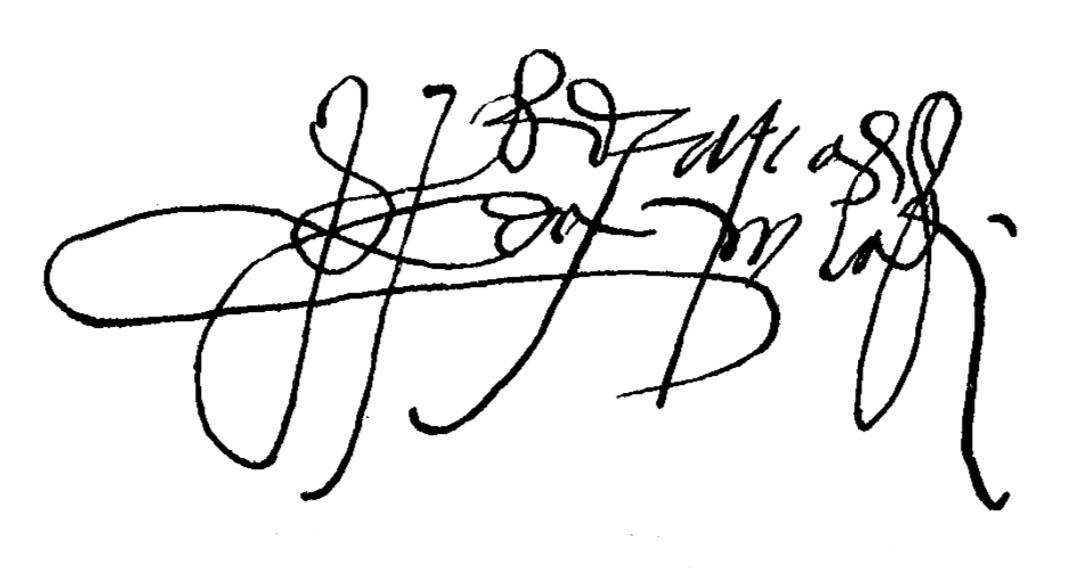
- Signature
- Nickname(s): Pedrarias, el Galán, el Justador

Military service
- Allegiance: Spanish Empire
- Branch/service: Infantry
- Rank: General
- Battles/wars: Conquest of Granada (1492); Capture of Oran (1509); Capture of Béjaïa (1510)

Pedro Arias de Ávila (c. 1440 – 6 March 1531; often Pedro Arias Dávila or Pedrarias Dávila) was a Spanish soldier and colonial administrator. He led the first great Spanish expedition to the mainland of the Americas. There, he served as governor of Panama (1514–1526) and Nicaragua (1527–1531), and founded Panama City (1519). He died in 1531 aged around 90 or 91.

== Family ==
Pedrarias was the son of Pedro Arias and María Ortiz de Cota. He was born into a prominent and well-connected Spanish family. His grandfather, Diego Arias de Ávila, was chief comptroller and a key adviser to King Enrique IV; his older brother was the Count of Puñonrostro; and his uncle was the Bishop of Segovia, a wealthy man who left Pedrarias a fortune.

== Early life ==
As a boy, he was a page in the court of King Juan II of Castile. Physically imposing and athletic, he was nicknamed "the jouster" for his skill in tournaments and "the gallant" in reference to his extravagant wardrobe and spendthrift habits. In later life, he served in the war against the Moors in Granada (1482–1492) and distinguished himself as a colonel of infantry fighting in North Africa (1508–1511). When he returned to Spain, he received a promotion, a citation for valor, and another nickname: "the lion of Bugia".

Towards the end of 1485, he married an intimate friend of queen Isabella I of Spain, Isabel de Bobadilla y Peñalosa, the daughter of Francisco de Bobadilla who was appointed to succeed Christopher Columbus as the second governor of the Indies in 1499.

A few years before 1513, he collapsed of some unrecorded illness. As he was about to be lowered to his grave, a tearful servant who was embracing the casket was astonished to hear movement inside. Incredibly, Arias was breathing and very much alive. Thereafter, he ordered an annual Requiem Mass sung for him in the cathedral at Torrejón, and stood in his own unused grave to listen to it. He took his coffin everywhere he went, even to the New World.

In 1514, at the age of nearly seventy, he was made commander by King Ferdinand II of Aragon of the largest Spanish expedition (19 vessels and 1,500 men) hitherto sent to America.

== America ==
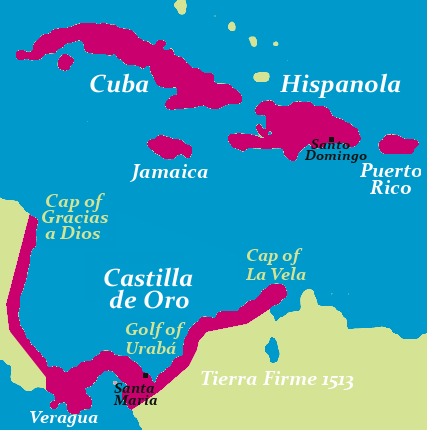
Tierra Firme 1513 - Castilla de Oro

They reached Santa Marta in Colombia in July 1514. They then proceeded to Darién, where Vasco Núñez de Balboa ruled as governor.

Arias Dávila superseded him and promised him his daughter in wedlock but he had Balboa judicially murdered at age 44 on 15 January 1519. Arias Dávila's daughter was known as "María de Peñalosa" to honor her female ancestors, something by no means uncommon among the high Spanish nobility at the time. In 1524, she married Rodrigo de Contreras, (Segovia, 1502 – 1558). They had 11 children. María died at Ciudad de los Reyes on 25 May 1573.

Another of Arias Dávila's daughters, who was born when he was elderly, Isabel Arias or Isabel de Bobadilla (to mark the female ancestors of the family), was married in Valladolid, Spain, 1537, to his loyal lieutenant Hernando de Soto, the successful conquistador and explorer of Florida and Mississippi and Governor of Cuba.

In 1519, Arias Dávila founded Panama City and moved his capital there in 1524, abandoning Darién. Dávila sent Gil González Dávila to explore to the north. In 1524, he sent another expedition under Francisco Hernández de Córdoba, who was executed there in 1526 by order of Dávila, by then aged over 85.

María Ortiz Cota, the mother of Dávila, was the daughter of Toledo family member and Royal Treasurer Alonso Cota (died 1468) who was married to one Teresa Ortiz, their children being known however as "Ortiz Cota" under the Portuguese family style, whereas, following the Spanish succession style, they would have been known as "Cota Ortiz".

Moreover, he was a party to the original agreement with Francisco Pizarro and Diego de Almagro which brought about the discovery of Peru, but he withdrew (1526) for a small compensation, having lost confidence in the outcome. In the same year, he was superseded as Governor of Panama by Pedro de los Ríos and retired to León, Nicaragua, where he was named its new governor on 1 July 1527. Here he lived for the rest of his life until his death on 6 March 1531. He left an unenviable record, as a man of unreliable character, and who was cruel and unscrupulous.

Through his foundation of Panama, however, he laid the basis for the discovery of South America's west coast and the subsequent conquest of Peru.

== Spanish references ==
- Alvarez Rubiano, Pablo: Pedrarias Dávila. Contribución a la figura del "Gran Justador", Gobernador de Castilla del Oro y Nicaragua. Madrid, 1944.
- Cantera Burgos, Francisco: Pedrarias Dávila y Cota, capitán general y gobernador de Castilla del Oro y Nicaragua: sus antecedentes judíos. Universidad de Madrid, Cátedra de Lengua Hebrea e Historia de los judíos. Madrid, 1971.
- Gitlitz, David M., Los Arias Dávila de Segovia: entre la iglesia y la sinagoga (Baltimore: International Scholars Publications, 1996.
- Mena García, Carmen: Pedrarias Dávila o la Ira de Dios: una historia olvidada. Publicaciones de la Universidad de Sevilla, Sevilla, 1992; ISBN 84-7405-834-1
- Mena García, Carmen: Sevilla y las flotas de Indias. La gran armada de Castilla del Oro, 1513-1514. Universidad de Sevilla, Fundación cultural El Monte, Sevilla, 1998, 2ª edición Sevilla, 1999; ISBN 84-472-0459-6
- Mena García, Carmen: Un linaje de conversos en tierras americanas. Los testamentos de Pedrarias Dávila, gobernador de Castilla del Oro y Nicaragua. León, 2004; ISBN 84-9773-137-9
