= Royal fifth =

Historic royal tax

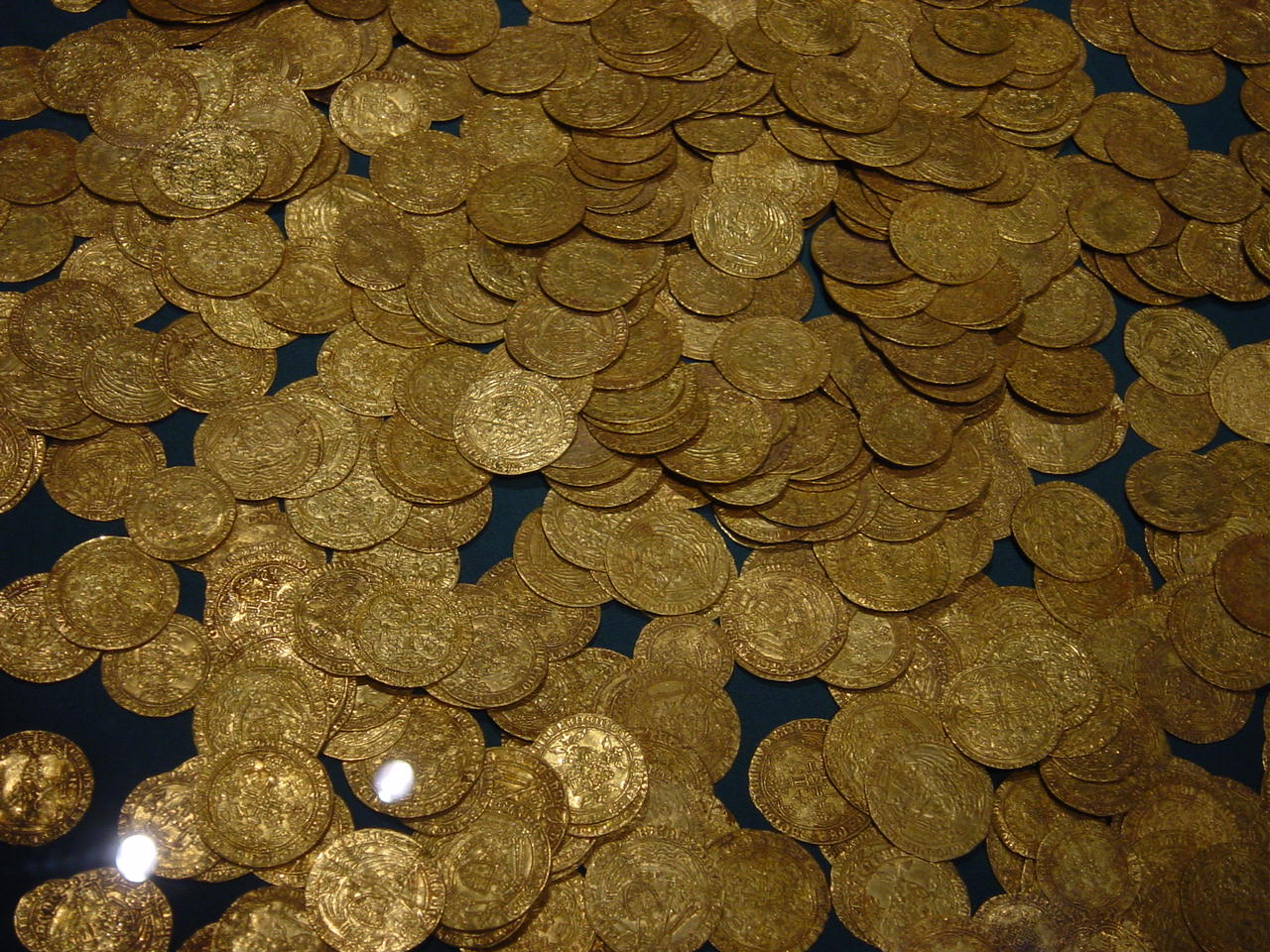
Hoard of ancient gold coins.

The royal fifth (Spanish: quinto del rey; Portuguese: quinto real) is a historical royal tax which reserves to the monarch 20% of all precious metals and other commodities (including slaves) acquired by his subjects as war loot, found as treasure or extracted by mining. The 'royal fifth' was first instituted in medieval Muslim states from interpretations of Qur'an, though the extent to which it applied was debated between schools of Islam. During the Age of Exploration, Christian Iberian kingdoms and their overseas colonial empires also instituted the tax, though to encourage exploration, some monarchs allowed colonists to keep some or all of the fifth.

== In Muslim kingdoms ==
The 20% tax rate on war booty stems from the practice of khums (Arabic: خُمْس, lit. 'fifth') in Islamic states. It was institutionalized from the start of the Islamic conquest, with the rate set down in Qur'an 8:41:

Know that whatever spoils you take, one-fifth is for Allah and the Messenger, his close relatives, orphans, the poor, and ˹needy˺ travellers, if you ˹truly˺ believe in Allah and what We revealed to Our servant on that decisive day when the two armies met ˹at Badr˺. And Allah is Most Capable of everything.

— Surah Al-Anfal 8:41

In practice, the share of the fifth reserved to the Prophet's family lapsed after Muhammad's death. The early Rashidun Caliphs, notably Caliph Omar, set down regulatory guidelines for what could and could not be regarded as war spoils, and assigned the fifth for welfare distribution. The 'fifth' eventually became an important source of financing for the Caliphal administration and army. Schools of Islamic law were divided on whether the fifth extended to treasure troves and mining. Some schools (notably, the Hanafite), regarded treasure and mines as 'spoils' and thus subject to the fifth, while others (notably, the Shafi'ite and Hanbalite) regarded them as subject only to the conventional rates, e.g. zakat.

The medieval Taifa kingdoms of al-Andalus embraced the Hanafi argument and institutionalized the fifth on war spoils, treasure troves and mining.

== In Christian kingdoms ==
In Christian kingdoms, the royal fifth partly comes from the medieval legal conception of seigneural or regalian rights over the natural patrimony, which assigned to the monarch or feudal overlord original property rights over all unclaimed, undiscovered and undeveloped natural resources (e.g. precious metals in the subsoil, salt in the rock, virgin forests, fish in the sea, etc.) within his jurisdiction. Consequently, private individuals who extracted these natural resources owed compensation to their original 'owner', the monarch. It was adopted by the Christian states of the Iberian Peninsula (Castile, Portugal, etc.) during the reconquista and extended to their overseas colonies in the Americas, Africa and Asia. They became an important part of crown finance.

During the age of exploration, Spanish and Portuguese captains and conquistadores were careful to always set aside the royal fifth from any spoils they captured, and accusations of embezzling the 'royal fifth' ended the careers of a few of them (e.g. Alonso de Ojeda, Pedro Alonso Niño). Nonetheless, to encourage exploration and colonization, Iberian monarchs often allowed explorers and colonial developers to retain part or all of the royal fifth, for at least some period of time. The conditions were usually spelled out in captaincy contracts or royal grants; e.g. in 1402, Jean de Béthencourt was allowed to keep the royal fifth as a condition for the conquest of the Canary Islands for Castile; in 1443, the Portuguese Prince Henry the Navigator was granted the royal fifth on all enterprise in the Madeira islands and sub-Saharan Africa; in 1492, Christopher Columbus was allowed to retain 10% of the royal fifth of the West Indies (although he famously argued he was promised more); the 1532 contracts of the captains-donatary of colonial Brazil allowed them to retain 5% of the royal fifth.

=== Spain ===
In Spain, the quinto real on mining of precious metals was codified by the edict of February 1504 and (with occasional exceptional grants) remained in force through all the Spanish empire until the 18th century. In 1723, it was reduced to a diezmo (10%) and in 1777 it was reduced further to 3%, with an additional duty of 2% if shipped to Spain.

Rather than levy the tax on the basis of the amount of silver or gold produced, the Spanish government tracked the amount of mercury used. Mercury was essential for the refinement of silver and gold in the patio process (see also amalgamation). The Spanish government had a monopoly of mercury production, through its mines at Almadén in Spain and at Huancavelica in Peru. In 1648, the Viceroy of Peru declared that Potosí and Huancavelica were "the two pillars that support this kingdom and that of Spain". Moreover, the viceroy thought that Spain could, if necessary, dispense with the silver from Potosí, but it could not dispense with the mercury from Huancavelica.
