= List of Liberty ships (P) =

This is a List of Liberty ships with names beginning with P.

== Description ==
The standard Liberty ship (EC-2-S-C1 type) was a cargo ship 441 feet 6 inches (134.57 m) long overall, with a beam of 56 feet 10 3/4 inches (17.34 m). It had a depth of 37 feet 4 inches (11.38 m) and a draft of 26 feet 10 inches (8.18 m). It was powered by a triple expansion steam engine, which had cylinders of 24 1/2 inches (62 cm), 37 inches (94 cm) and 70 inches (180 cm) diameter by 48 inches (120 cm) stroke. The engine produced 2,500ihp at 76rpm. Driving a four-blade propeller 18 feet 6 inches (5.64 m) in diameter, could propel the ship at 11 knots (20 km/h).

Cargo was carried in five holds, numbered 1–5 from bow to stern. Grain capacity was 84,183 cubic feet (2,383.8 m^{3}), 145,604 cubic feet (4,123.0 m^{3}), 96,429 cubic feet (2,730.6 m^{3}), 93,190 cubic feet (2,639 m^{3}) and 93,190 cubic feet (2,639 m^{3}), with a further 49,086 cubic feet (1,390.0 m^{3}) in the deep tanks. Bale capacity was 75,405 cubic feet (2,135.2 m^{3}), 134,638 cubic feet (3,812.5 m^{3}), 83,697 cubic feet (2,370.0 m^{3}), 82,263 cubic feet (2,329.4 m^{3}) and 82,435 cubic feet (2,334.3 m^{3}), with a further 41,135 cubic feet (1,164.8 m^{3}) in the deep tanks.

It carried a crew of 45, plus 36 United States Navy Armed Guard gunners. Later in the war, this was altered to a crew of 52, plus 29 gunners. Accommodation was in a three deck superstructure placed midships. The galley was equipped with a range, a 25 US gallons (95 L) stock kettle and other appliances. Messrooms were equipped with an electric hot plate and an electric toaster.

== Paine Wingate ==
Paine Wingate was built by was built by California Shipbuilding Corporation, Terminal Island, Los Angeles, California. Her keel was laid on 31 January 1942. She was launched on 21 April and delivered on 27 May. Laid up in the James River post-war, she was sold to shipbreakers in Cleveland, Ohio in January 1973.

== Palawan ==
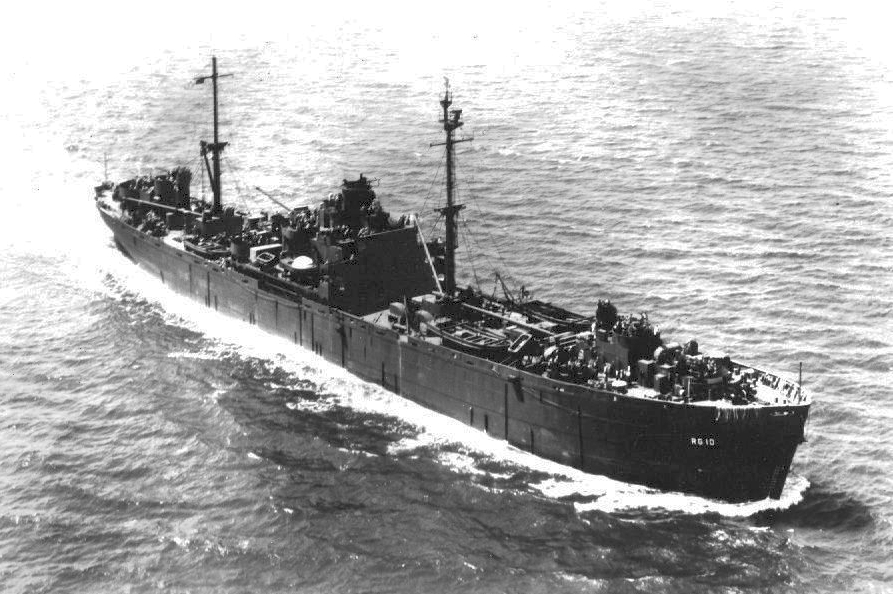
USS Palawan

Palawan was built by Bethlehem Fairfield Shipyard, Baltimore, Maryland. Her keel was laid on 10 July 1944. She was launched on 12 August and delivered on 29 August. To the United States Navy. Laid up in reserve at San Diego, California in January 1947. To the United States Maritime Administration in February 1962 and laid up in Suisun Bay. She was scuttled off Redondo Beach, California on 13 September 1977.

== Park Benjamin ==
Park Benjamin was built by New England Shipbuilding Corporation, South Portland, Maine. Her keel was laid on 29 January 1944. She was launched on 19 March and delivered on 31 March. She was scrapped at Seattle, Washington in July 1959.

== Park Holland ==
Park Holland was built by New England Shipbuilding Corporation. Her keel was laid on 30 July 1943. She was launched on 14 September and delivered on 28 September. Built for the War Shipping Administration (WSA), she was operated under the management of W. J. Rountree & Co. She was laid up in the James River on 3 June 1946 and transferred to the United States Maritime Commission (USMC) on 25 January 1947. Sold on 5 February 1947 to Norge av D/S Sjøfart, Lillesand, Norway and renamed Ocean Liberty. Operated under the management of T. S. Bendixen A/S. She caught fire and exploded at Brest, France on 28 July 1947; attempts by a French Navy gunboat to scuttle her having failed. She was destroyed apart from the stern section. Twenty people were killed and 400 were injured.

== Pat Harrison ==
Pat Harrison was built by Delta Shipbuilding Company, New Orleans, Louisiana. Her keel was laid on 8 November 1942. She was launched on 24 December and delivered on 15 January 1943. Built for the WSA, she was operated under the management of Standard Fruit & Steamship Co. Damaged by an Italian limpet mine at Gibraltar on 8 May 1943 whilst on a voyage from Oran, Algeria to an American port. She was beached and declared a constructive total loss. She was cut in two in 1949. Both sections were towed to Cádiz, Spain in 1950. They were scrapped in May 1951.

== Patrick B. Whalen ==
Patrick B. Whalen was built by J. A. Jones Construction Company, Brunswick, Georgia. Her keel was laid on 29 January 1945. She was launched on 15 March and delivered on 30 March. Built for the WSA, she was operated under the management of Isbrandtsen Co. Sold in 1949 to Atlantic Marine Transport Co., New York and renamed Christam. Sold in 1950 to Prudential Steamship Corporation, New York and renamed Bostonian. Sold in 1951 to Atlantic Marine Transport Co. and renamed Christam. Renamed Manhattan in 1952. Sold later that year to National Transocean Carriers. Operated under the management of Orion Shipping & Trading Co. Sold in 1953 to Phoenix Steamship Corp. and renamed Seadragon, remaining under the same management. Sold later that year to Navigator Steamship Corp. and renamed Charles C. Dunaif. Operated under the management of Polarus Steamship Corp. Sold in 1958 to Cargo Ships & Tankers Inc., New York. Sold in 1961 to Seatramp Inc. and renamed Wilderness. Reflagged to Liberia, remaining under the same management. Lengthened at Cadíz in 1962. Now 511 feet 6 inches (155.91 m) long and 8,457 GRT. Sold later that year to Cargo Ships & Tankers Inc. and reflagged to the United States. Sold in 1967 to Debbie May Shipping Corp. and renamed Debbie May. She was scrapped at Kaohsiung, Taiwan in May 1967.

== Patrick C. Boyle ==
Patrick C. Boyle was built by Bethlehem Fairfield Shipyard. Her keel was laid on 22 August 1943. She was launched on 15 September and delivered on 23 September. She was scrapped at Baltimore in February 1960.

== Patrick H. Morrissey ==
Patrick H. Morrissey was built by J. A. Jones Construction Co., Brunswick. Her keel was laid on 23 October 1943. She was launched as Patrick H. Morrissey on 9 December and delivered as Samdee on 17 December. To the Ministry of War Transport (MoWT) under Lend-Lease. Operated under the management of T. & J. Brocklebank Ltd. Sold in 1947 to J. & C. Harrison Ltd., London and renamed Malabar. Sold in 1961 to Omonia Compania Navigation, Panama and renamed Omonia. Reflagged to Lebanon and operated under the management of Tharros Shipping Co. Management transferred to Pegasus Ocean Services in 1964. She was scrapped at Hirao, Japan in 1967.

== Patrick Henry ==
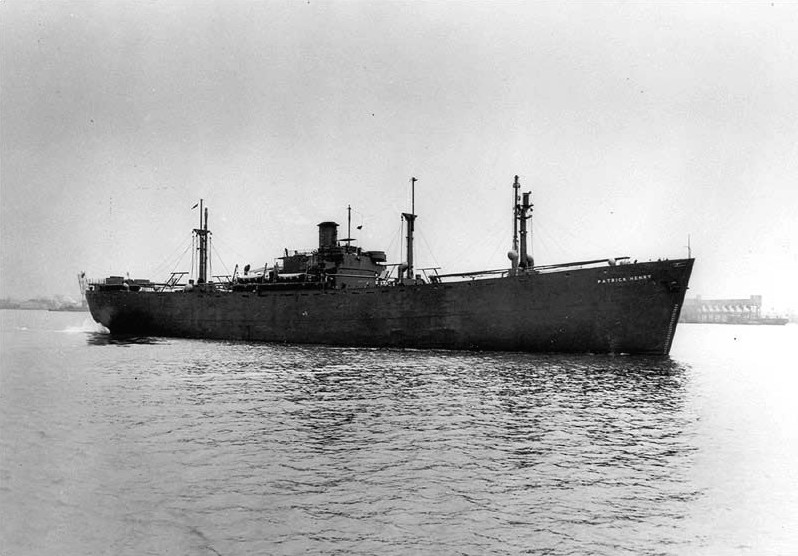
Patrick Henry

Patrick Henry was the first Liberty ship built in the United States. She was built by Bethlehem Fairfield Shipyard. Her keel was laid on 30 April 1941. She was launched on 27 September and delivered on 30 December. She struck a reef off the coast of Florida (25°08′N 80°16′W) in July 1946 whilst on a voyage from Sète, France to New Orleans. She was refloated and completed her voyage, but was consequently laid up at Mobile, Alabama. She was scrapped by Patapsco Scrap Corporation, Baltimore in October 1958.

== Patrick S. Mahoney ==
Patrick S. Mahoney was built by J. A. Jones Construction Co., Brunswick. Her keel was laid on 30 December 1944. She was launched on 10 February 1945 and delivered on 22 February. Built for the WSA, she was operated under the management of Black Diamond Steamship Company. She was scrapped at Baltimore in February 1960.

== Paul Buck ==
Paul Buck was built by New England Shipbuilding Corporation. Her keel was laid on 4 November 1944. She was launched on 17 December and delivered on 31 December. She was scrapped at Mobile in March 1966.

== Paul Bunyan ==
Paul Bunyan was built by Todd Houston Shipbuilding Corporation, Houston, Texas. Her keel was laid on 5 September 1944. She was launched on 17 October and delivered on 24 October. She was sold for scrapping on 23 January 1964, but was still at Philadelphia in 1969, scrapping having been postponed due to the Vietnam War. She was scrapped at Philadelphia in October 1971.

== Paul Chandler ==
Paul Chandler was built by California Shipbuilding Corporation. Her keel was laid on 31 August 1943. She was launched on 24 September and delivered on 7 October. Built for the WSA, she was operated under the management of Stockard Steamship Corp. To the Dutch Government in 1947 and renamed Jeroan Busch. Sold to Vinke & Zonen, Rotterdam later that year and renamed Ootmarsum. Sold in 1949 to Montaan Transport N.V., Den Haag and renamed Joost van den Vondel. Sold in 1950 to Compania Navigation Sparto, Panama and renamed Sparto. Operated under the management of Lemos & Pateras. Sold in 1963 to Olishipo Compania Navigation and renamed Irena. Reflagged to Greece and operated under the management of Franco Shipping Co. Sold in 1969 to Irene Shipping Co., Limassol, Cyprus. She was scrapped at Bilbao, Spain in August 1971.

== Paul David Jones ==
Paul David Jones was built by Todd Houston Shipbuilding Corporation. Her keel was laid on 20 October 1944. She was launched on 24 November and delivered on 6 December. She was scrapped at Panama City, Florida in 1967.

== Paul Dunbar ==
Paul Dunbar was a tanker built by California Shipbuilding Corporation. She was completed in November 1943. Built for the WSA, she was initially operated under the management of Pacific Tankers Corp. Management was transferred to Dichmann, Wright & Pugh before the end of the year. To the Soviet Union in 1944 under Lend-Lease and renamed Byelgorod. Returned to the WSA in 1947 and renamed Paul Dunbar. Laid up in the James River in 1948. Sold in 1951 to Hess Inc., Perth Amboy, New Jersey and renamed Morris Hess. Sold in 1954 to San Rafael Compania Navigation and renamed Palatiani. Reflagged to Panama. Operated under the management of Orion Shipping & Trading Co. Converted to a cargo ship at Greenock, United Kingdom. Lengthened at Sasebo, Japan in 1956, now 511 feet 6 inches (155.91 m) long and 8,371 GRT. Reflagged to Liberia that year. Renamed Andros Pearl in 1957. Sold in 1960 to Seafreight Transport Corp. and renamed Ilissos. Reflagged to Greece, remaining under the same management. Sold in 1962 to Elva Compania Maritima and renamed Elena. Operated under the management of Trans-Ocean Steamship Agency. Sold in 1966 to Astronato Compania Navigation, Panama and renamed Orient Importer. Reflagged to Liberia and operated under the management of Eagle Ocean Transport Inc. She was scrapped at Hirao in January 1969.

== Paul Hamilton ==
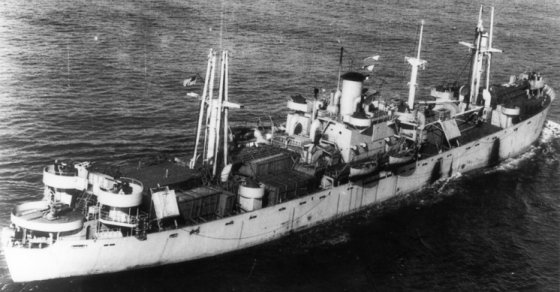
Paul Hamilton

Paul Hamilton was built by North Carolina Shipbuilding Company, Wilmington, North Carolina. Her keel was laid on 30 August 1942. She was launched on 20 October and delivered on 29 October. Built for the WSA, she was operated under the management of Black Diamond Steamship Company. She was torpedoed in the Mediterranean Sea north of Algiers, Algeria (37°02′N 3°20′E) by aircraft on 20 April 1942 whilst on a voyage from Norfolk, Virginia to Bizerte, Tunisia. She caught fire, exploded and sank.

== Paul Hamilton Hayne ==
Paul Hamilton Hayne was built by North Carolina Shipbuilding Company. Her keel was laid on 15 October 1942. She was launched on 24 November and delivered on 4 December. Built for the WSA, she was operated under the management of States Marine Corp. Sold in 1947 to Waterman Steamship Corporation, Mobile and renamed Governor Sparks. Sold in 1949 to Clifton Steamship Corp., New York and renamed Denise. Sold in 1958 to Pier Shipping Corp., New York and renamed Chirjuca. Renamed Isaac Mann in 1960. Sold in 1962 to Earl J. Smith & Co., New York. Sold in 1965 to U.S. Bulk Carriers Inc., New York and renamed U.S. Merrimac. Sold in 1966 to Neptune Maritime Leasing Corp. and renamed Arlene. Operated under the management of Poles Tublin Patestides & Strakis. She was scrapped at Kaohsiung in April 1967.

== Paul Revere ==
Paul Revere was built by California Shipbuilding Company. Her keel was laid on 10 July 1941. She was launched on 21 December and delivered on 8 April 1942. She was scrapped at New Orleans in 1965.

== Paul Tulane ==
Paul Tulane was a tanker built by Delta Shipbuilding Company. Her keel was laid on 28 September 1943. She was launched on 6 November and delivered on 17 December. To the United States Navy and renamed Kangaroo. Returned to the WSA in May 1946 and renamed Paul Tulane. Sold in 1948 to Federal Motorship Corp., New York and renamed Mostank. Sold in 1950 to Seaforth Steamship Corp. and renamed Seabrave. Operated under the management of Orion Shipping & Trading Co. Sold in 1954 to Isla Navarino Compania Navigation and renamed Niborio. Reflagged to Panama, remaining under the same management. Converted to a cargo ship at Schiedam, Netherlands. Now 7,179 GRT. Sold in 1957 to Transmarine Navigation Inc. and renamed Andros Seafarer, remaining under the same flag and management. Management transferred to Maritime Overseas Corporation in 1960. Sold in 1963 to Caroline Navigation Inc. and renamed San Pablo. Operated under the management of Ceres Shipping Ltd. She was scrapped at Kaohsiung in March 1969.

== Pearl Harbor ==
Pearl Harbor was built by Bethlehem Fairfield Shipyard. Her keel was laid on 10 November 1942. She was launched on 10 November 1942. She was launched on 7 December and delivered on 21 December. She was scrapped at New Orleans in 1962.

== Pedro Menendez ==
Pedro Menendez was built by J. A. Jones Construction Company, Panama City, Florida. Her keel was laid on 24 June 1944. She was launched on 31 July and delivered on 18 August. She was scrapped at New Orleans in November 1966.

== Peleg Wadsworth ==
Peleg Wadsworth was built by New England Shipbuilding Corporation. Her keel was laid on 1 November 1943. She was launched as Peleg Wadsworth on 12 December and delivered as Samtampa on 22 December. To the MoWT under Lend-Lease, operated under the management of Houlder Line. She ran aground and was wrecked at Sker Point on 23 April 1947 whilst on a voyage from Middlesbrough to Newport, United Kingdom.

== Penelope Barker ==
Penelope Barker was built by North Carolina Shipbuilding Company. Her keel was laid on 28 October 1942. She was launched on 1 December and delivered on 15 December. Built for the WSA, she was operated under the management of North Atlantic & Gulf Steamship Co. She was torpedoed and sunk in the Barents Sea (73°02′N 23°20′W) by U-271 on 25 January 1944 whilst on a voyage from Loch Ewe to the Kola Inlet.

== Percy D. Haughton ==
Percy D. Haughton was built by New England Shipbuilding Corporation. Her keel was laid on 11 October 1943. She was launched as Percy D. Haughton on 24 November and delivered as Samtrent on 30 November. To the MoWT under Lend-Lease. Operated under the management of Union-Castle Mail Steamship Co. Returned to the USMC in 1947 and laid up at Mobile. She was scrapped there in April 1967.

== Percy E. Foxworth ==
Percy E. Foxworth was built by Permanente Metals Corporation. Her keel was laid on 19 January 1944. She was launched on 8 February and delivered on 15 February. She was scrapped at Panama City, Florida in October 1969.

== Pere Marquette ==
Pere Marquette was built by Permanente Metals Corporation. Her keel was laid on 12 December 1942. She was launched on 15 January 1943 and delivered on 25 January. Laid up at Mobile post-war, she was scrapped at Tampa, Florida in January 1971.

== Peregrine White ==
Peregrine White was built by New England Shipbuilding Corporation. Her keel was laid on 30 July 1943. She was launched on 14 September and delivered on 28 September. Built for the WSA, she was operated under the management of Black Diamond Steamship Company. Sold in 1947 to Compagnia Ligure di Navigazione, Genoa, Italy and renamed Liguria. Renamed Matteo Marsano in 1949 and placed under the management of Andrea Marsano in 1950. Renamed Golfo di Napoli in 1957. Sold in 1962 to Compagnia Generale di Navigazione SpA. Operated under the management of Marsano Gestioni Maritime. Management transferred to Andrea Marsano & Figli in 1965. She was scrapped at La Spezia in December 1970.

== Peter Cartwright ==
Peter Cartwright was built by California Shipbuilding Corporation. Her keel was laid on 3 July 1942. She was launched on 15 August and delivered on 3 September. She was scrapped at Galveston, Texas in 1961.

== Peter Cooper ==
Peter Cooper was built by Bethlehem Fairfield Shipyard. Her keel was laid on 24 July 1943. She was launched as Peter Cooper on 25 August and delivered as Samarkand on 5 September. To the MoWT under Lend-Lease. Operated under the management of Alfred Holt & Co. Sold in 1947 to Ocean Steamship Co. and renamed Talthybias, remaining under the same management. Sold in 1954 to Glen Line Ltd. and renamed Gleniffer. In 1956, she was requisitioned by the Ministry of Transport for use as a storeship during the Suez Crisis. Sold in 1958 to Columbine Shipping Co. and renamed Dove. Reflagged to Liberia and operated under the management of S.A.G.E.D. Sold in 1965 to Partiarch Steamship Co., New York and renamed Patraic Sky., remaining under the Liberian flag. She was scrapped at Split, Yugoslavia in April 1971.

== Peter Cooper Hewitt ==
Peter Cooper Hewitt was built by Permanente Metals Corporation. Her keel was laid on 30 September 1943. She was launched on 22 October and delivered on 29 October. Built for the WSA, she was operated under the management of Matson Navigation Co. Sold in 1947 to Navigazione Viarreggina, Viareggio, Italy and renamed Citta di Viarregio. Sold in 1962 to Seaspray Shipping Co. and renamed Sea Spray. Reflagged to Liberia and operated under the management of Ballestro, Tuena & Canella. She was scrapped at La Spezia in February 1967.

== Peter de Smet ==
Peter de Smet was built by Oregon Shipbuilding Corporation. Her keel was laid on 5 August 1943. She was launched on 24 August and delivered on 1 September. She was scrapped at Philadelphia in September 1968.

== Peter Donahue ==
Peter Donahue was built by Marinship Corporation, Sausalito, California. Her keel was laid on 21 December 1942. She was launched on 12 February 1943 and delivered on 17 March. She was scrapped at Oakland, California in September 1963.

== Peter H. Burnett ==
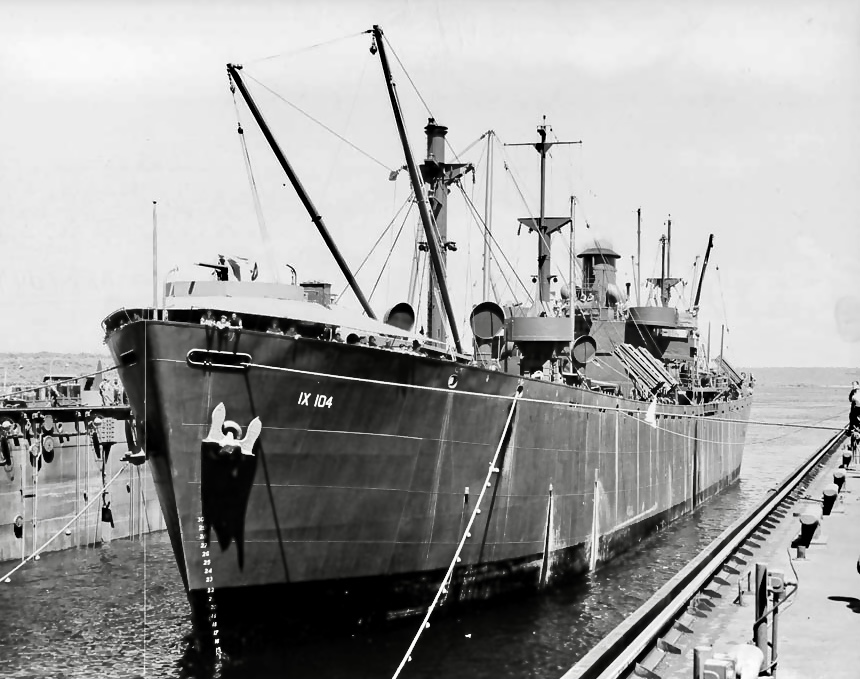
USS P. H. Burnett

Peter H. Burnett was built by California Shipbuilding Corporation. Her keel was laid on 29 June 1942. She was launched on 10 August and delivered on 29 September. Built for the WSA, she was operated under the management of American President Lines. She was torpedoed and damaged south of the Cook Islands (32°54′S 159°32′E by I-21 on 22 January 1943 whilst on a voyage from Newcastle, Australia to San Francisco, California. She was abandoned by her crew, but reboarded on 25 January and taken in tow for Sydney, Australia by USS Zane. Following temporary repairs, she was acquired by the United States Navy in June 1943 and renamed P. H. Burnett. Towed to Seattle in June 1946. Returned to the WSA and renamed Peter H. Burnett. She was scrapped at Terminal Island in 1959.

== Peter J. McGuire ==
Peter J. McGuire was built by Permanente Metals Corporation. Her keel was laid on 22 July 1942. She was launched on 7 September and delivered on 21 September. She was scrapped at Terminal Island in March 1968.

== Peter Lassen ==
Peter Lassen was built by California Shipbuilding Corporation. Her keel was laid on 11 March 1944. She was launched on 7 April and delivered on 24 April. Built for the WSA, she was operated under the management of W. R. Chamberlain & Co. To the United States War Department in 1946. Sold in July 1947 to Henriksens Rederi A/S, Oslo and renamed Bonde. Operated under the management of Dagfin Henriksen. Sold in June 1961 to Supreme Shipping Co. Inc., Panama and renamed Chepo. Sold in 1964 to Eastern Carriers Inc., Panama and renamed Golden Rose. She arrived at Kaohsiung for scrapping in the second quarter of 1968.

== Peter Minuit ==
Peter Minuit was built by Bethlehem Fairfield Shipyard. Her keel was laid on 28 January 1942. She was launched on 23 April and delivered on 27 May. She was scrapped at New Orleans in December 1963.

== Peter Moran ==
Peter Moran was built by Oregon Shipbuilding Corporation. Her keel was laid on 10 January 1944. She was launched on 28 January and delivered on 4 February. She was scrapped at Osaka, Japan in June 1961.

== Peter Silvester ==
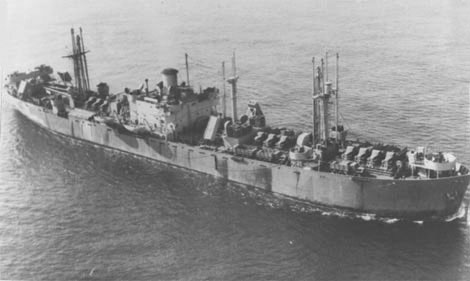
Peter Silvester

Peter Silvester was built by California Shipbuilding Corporation. Her keel was laid on 31 March 1942. She was launched on 27 May and delivered on 22 June. Built for the WSA, she was operated under the management of Pacific Far East Lines. She was torpedoed and sunk in the Indian Ocean 800 nautical miles (1,500 km) off Fremantle, Australia (34°19′S 99°37′E) by U-862 on 6 February 1945.

== Peter Skene Ogden ==
Peter Skene Ogden was built by Oregon Shipbuilding Corporation. Her keel was laid on 18 October 1942. She was launched on 14 November and delivered on 24 November. Built for the WSA, she was operated under the management of W. R. Chamberlin & Co. She was torpedoed and damaged in the Mediterranean Sea north east of Algiers (37°22′N 7°17′E) by U-969 on 22 February 1844 whilst on a voyage from Naples to the Hampton Roads, Virginia. She was beached near Bône, Algeria on 26 February. Declared a constructive total loss, she was subsequently scrapped.

== Peter Stuyvesant ==
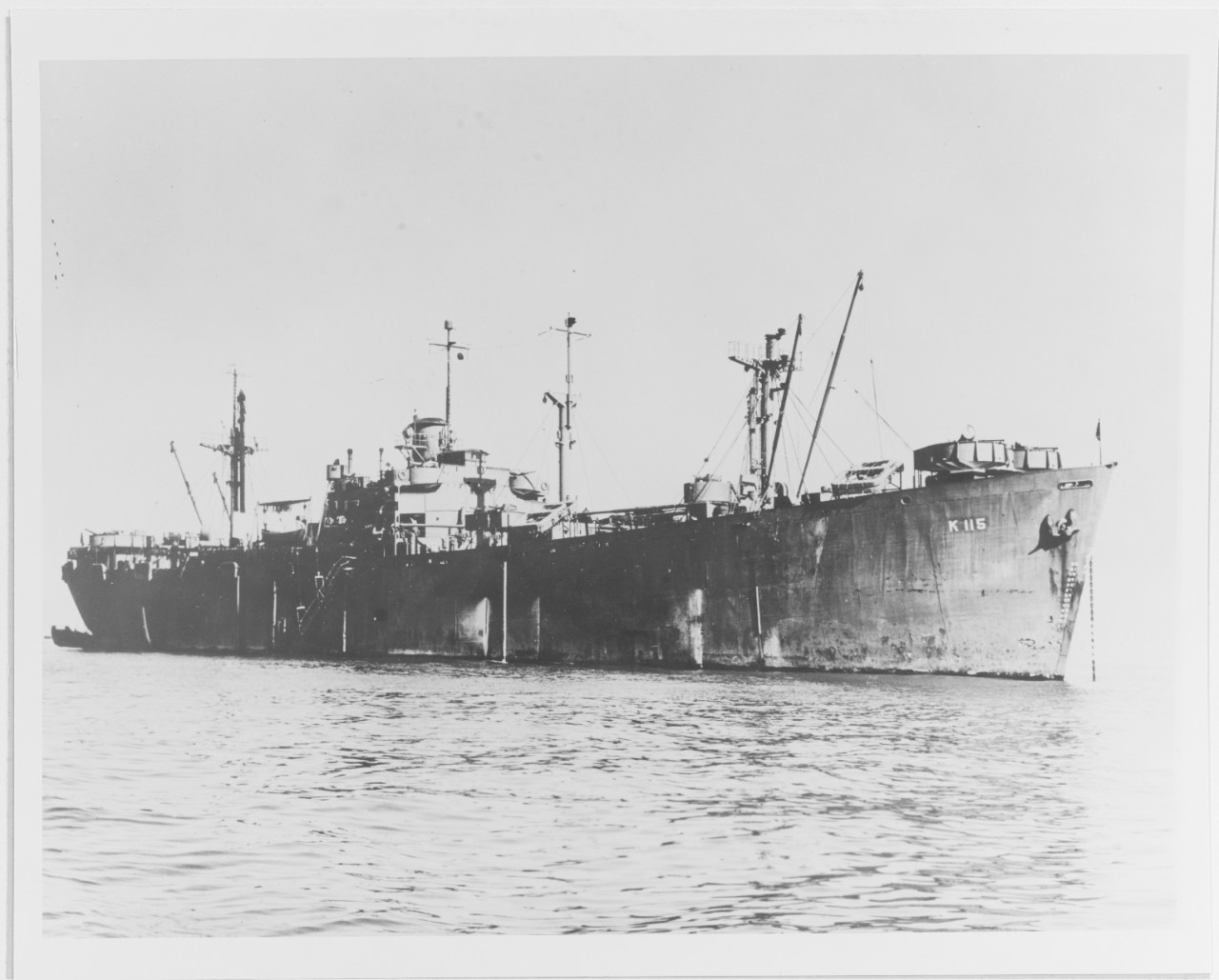
USS Crux

Peter Stuyvesant was built by St. Johns River Shipbuilding Company, Jacksonville, Florida. Her keel was laid on 27 September 1943. She was launched on 16 November and delivered on 27 November. To the United States Navy and renamed Crux. Returned to WSA in June 1946 and renamed Peter Stuyvesant. Laid up in Suisun Bay. She was scrapped at Oakland in March 1962.

== Peter Trimble Rowe ==
Peter Trimble Rowe was built by Permanente Metals Corporation. Her keel was laid on 16 October 1943. She was launched on 4 November and delivered on 12 November. She was scrapped at Baltimore in February 1962.

== Peter V. Daniel ==
Peter V. Daniel was built by California Shipbuilding Corporation. Her keel was laid on 25 September 1942. She was launched on 28 October and delivered on 14 November. She was scrapped at Philadelphia in 1963.

== Peter White ==
Peter White was built by Oregon Shipbuilding Corporation. Her keel was laid on 4 October 1943. She was launched on 23 October and delivered on 31 October. She struck a mine off Leyte, Philippines (14°25′N 123°45′E) in August 1945. Following temporary repairs, she was towed to Portland, Oregon. Declared a constructive total loss, she was scrapped there in June 1949.

== Peter Zenger ==
Peter Zenger was built by J. A. Jones Construction Company, Panama City. Her keel was laid on 31 March 1943. She was launched on 4 July and delivered on 31 July. She was scrapped at Portland, Oregon in August 1966.

== Philander C. Knox ==
Philander C. Knox was built by Delta shipbuilding Company. Her keel was laid on 9 January 1943. She was launched on 24 February and delivered on 31 March. She was scrapped at Hamburg, West Germany in March 1961.

== Philip C. Shera ==
Philip C. Shera was built by California Shipbuilding Corporation. Her keel was laid on 13 November 1943. She was launched on 11 December and delivered on 28 December. Built for the WSA, she was operated under the management of American-Hawaiian Steamship Company. Sold in 1947 to Los Bros. & A. K. Pezas, Chios, Greece and renamed Igor. Operated under the management of S. Livanos & Co. Management transferred to Nomikos Ltd. in 1948. Sold in 1952 to A. K. Pezas, remaining under the same management. Sold in 1960 to Taiwan Chung Hsing Steamship Co., Taipei, Taiwan. Reflagged to China. Reflagged to Taiwan in 1965. She was scrapped at Kaohsiung in February 1969.

== Philip Doddridge ==
Philip Doddridge was built by North Carolina Shipbuilding Company. Her keel was laid on 18 April 1943. She was launched on 13 May and delivered on 19 May. Built for the WSA, she was operated under the management of Marine Transport Line. Sold in August 1947 to Skips A/S Lundegaard, Farsund, Norway and renamed Feggen. Operated under the management of Lundegaard & Sønner. Sold in 1961 to Marviva Compania Navigation S.A., Piraeus and renamed Theodora. Operated under the management of Laimos Bros. Ltd. She was scrapped at Whampoa Dock in March 1969.

== Philip F. Thomas ==
Philip F. Thomas was built by Bethlehem Fairfield Shipyard. Her keel was laid on 13 August 1943. She was launched on 7 September and delivered on 16 September. Built for the WSA, she was operated under the management of Calmar Steamship Company. Management transferred to Sprague Steamship Co. in 1946. Laid up at Wilmington, North Carolina in 1948, she was sold in 1951 to Eastern Seaways Corp. and renamed Mount Vernon. Operated under the management of Orion Shipping & Trading Co. Renamed Seaworld in 1952. Renamed Pelagia in 1953 and placed under the management of Mar-Trade Corp. Management transferred to Tankship Management Corp. in 1954. She broke in two and sank off the Lofoten Islands, Norway (67°15′N 11°35′E) on 15 September 1956 whilst on a voyage from Narvik, Norway to Baltimore.

== Philip H. Sheridan ==
Philip H. Sheridan was built by Permanente Metals Corporation. Her keel was laid on 24 July 1942. She was launched on 9 September and delivered on 29 September. She was scrapped at Portland, Oregon in July 1969.

== Philip Kearny ==
Philip Kearny was built by Marinship Corporation. Her keel was laid on 10 August 1942. She was launched on 7 December and delivered on 29 January 1943. She was scrapped at Tacoma in June 1969.

== Philip Livingston ==
Philip Livingston was built by Oregon Shipbuilding Corporation. Her keel was laid on 18 July 1941. She was launched on 21 December and delivered on 7 March 1942. Built for the WSA, she was operated under the management of American-Hawaiian Steamship Company. Laid up in the James River on 16 October 1945. To USMC on 12 August 1947. Sold on 4 September to Krogstad Shipping Agencies Ltd, Oslo and renamed Nidardal. Sold on 1 March 1949 to Rederiet A/S Nidaros, Oslo. Operated under the management of Gørrissen & Co. Sold in July 1949 to Rederiet Skibs A/S Karabien, Oslo. Operated under the management of Gørrissen & Klaveness. Renamed Tindra in January 1950. Sold in December 1952 to Korea Shipping Corp., Pusan, South Korea and renamed Donghae. She was scrapped at Pusan in January 1969.

== Philip P. Barbour ==
Philip P. Barbour was built by California Shipbuilding Corporation. Her keel was laid on 23 September 1942. She was launched on 26 October and delivered on 12 November. Laid up at Mobile post-war, she was scrapped at Panama City, Florida in June 1971.

== Philip Schuyler ==
Philip Schuyler was built by Oregon Shipbuilding Corporation. Her keel was laid on 19 November 1941. She was launched on 15 February 1942 and delivered on 4 April. She was scrapped at New Orleans in June 1967.

== Phineas Banning ==
Phineas Banning was built by California Shipbuilding Corporation. Her keel was laid on 12 January 1943. She was launched on 9 February and delivered on 27 February. She was scrapped at San Francisco in May 1967.

== Phoebe A. Hearst ==
Phoebe A. Hearst was built by California Shipbuilding Corporation. Her keel was laid on 9 December 1942. She was launched on 7 January 1943 and delivered on 22 January. Built for the WSA, she was operated under the management of American President Lines. Torpedoed and sunk north of the Fiji Islands (20°07′S 177°33′E) by I-19 on 30 April 1943 whilst on a voyage from Noumea, New Caledonia to a port in Western Samoa.

== Pierce Butler ==
Pierce Butler was built by Bethlehem Fairfield Shipyard. Her keel was laid on 27 June 1942. She was launched on 18 August and delivered on 27 August. Built for the WSA, she was operated under the management of Calmar Steamship Co. She was torpedoed and sunk in the Indian Ocean off the east coast of the Union of South Africa (29°40′S 35°35′E) by U-177 on 20 November 1942 whilst on a voyage from Baltimore to Mombasa, Kenya.

== Pierre Gibault ==
Pierre Gibault was built by Oregon Shipbuilding Corporation. Her keel was laid on 22 February 1943. She was launched on 15 March and delivered on 24 March. She struck a mine off Rhodes, Greece (36°08′N 29°30′E) on 22 June 1945 and was beached. She was refloated on 11 July and towed to Piraeus, where she was deemed a constructive total loss. She was towed to Palermo, Sicily, Italy on 8 September. She was towed to Savona in July 1948 and scrapped there in January 1949.

== Pierre La Clede ==
Pierre La Clede was built by Permanente Metals Corporation. Her keel was laid on 29 October 1942. She was launched on 29 November and delivered on 10 December. She was scrapped at Kearny in July 1970.

== Pierre L'Enfant ==
Pierre L'Enfant was a limited troop carrier built by Bethlehem Fairfield Shipyard. Her keel was laid on 17 May 1943. She was launched on 11 June and delivered on 28 June. Built for the WSA, she was operated under the management of Polarus Steamship Co. Sold in 1946 to Atlantic Maritime Co. and renamed Atlantic Wave. Reflagged to Panama and operated under the management of Boyd, Weir & Sewell. Management transferred to Maritime Brokers Inc. in 1952. Sold in 1953 to Atlantic Freighters Ltd. Operated under the management of Livanos Ltd. Sold in 1961 to Atlanska Plovidba, Dubrovnik, Yugoslavia and renamed Miljet. Operated under the management of Anglo-Yugoslav Shipping Corp. Sold in 1965 to Prekoolanska Plovidba, Bar, Yugoslavia and renamed Kolasin, remaining under the same management. She ran aground in the Black Sea 35 nautical miles (65 km) south of Tuapse, Soviet Union on 21 January 1970. Salvage attempts failed and she was abandoned as a total loss.

== Pierre S. Dupont ==
Pierre S. Dupont was built by Oregon Shipbuilding Corporation. Her keel was laid on 1 August 1942. She was launched on 27 August and delivered on 1 September. Laid up at Beaumont, Texas post-war, she was scrapped at Brownsville, Texas in September 1971.

== Pierre Soule ==
Pierre Soule was built by Delta Shipbuilding Company. Her keel was laid on 15 December 1942. She was launched on 30 January 1943 and delivered on 17 February. Built for the WSA, she was operated under the management of Moore-McCormack Lines. She was torpedoed and damaged in the Mediterranean Sea off Palermo, Sicily on 23 August 1943. She was towed in to Bizerta, then to Taranto, Italy, where she was repaired. She was scrapped at Mobile in December 1969.

== Pio Pico ==
Pio Pico was built by California Shipbuilding Corporation. Her keel was laid on 13 December 1942. She was launched on 11 January 1943 and delivered on 26 January. She was scrapped at Hirao in October 1960.

== Pittsburgh Seam ==
Pittsburgh Seam was a collier built by Delta Shipbuilding Company. Her keel was laid on 30 April 1945. She was launched on 11 July and delivered on 12 September. Built for the WSA, she was operated under the management of Eastern Gas & Fuel Association, Boston, Massachusetts. Sold to her managers in 1946. Sold to Mystic Steamship Division in 1947 and renamed Arlington. Operated under the management of her previous ownew. Converted to a non-propelled barge at Houston in 1962.

== Pleasant Armstrong ==
Pleasant Armstrong was built by Oregon Shipbuilding Corporation. Her keel was laid on 10 May 1943. She was launched as Pleasant Armstrong on 30 May and delivered as Vladivostock on 7 June. To the Soviet Union under Lend-Lease. Renamed Uelen in 1962. She was delivered to a shipyard in Vladivostok for scrapping in February 1976.

== Pocahontas ==
Pocahontas was built by North Carolina Shipbuilding Company. Her keel was laid on 11 November 1942. She was launched on 13 December and delivered on 27 December. She was scrapped at Troon, United Kingdom in September 1960.

== Pocahontas Seam ==
Pocahontas Seam was a collier built by Delta Shipbuilding Company. Her keel was laid on 1 March 1945. She was launched on 28 April and delivered on 30 June. Built for the WSA, she was operated under the management of Boland & Cornelius. Sold in 1948 to American Steamship Co. Sold later that year to Mystic Steamship Corp. and renamed Medford. Operated under the management of Eastern Gas & Fuel Association. Sold in 1954 to Atlantic Bulk Trading Corp. and renamed Osprey. Reflagged to Liberia and operated under the management of her previous owner. Sold in 1960 to Maretinia Shipping Co. Operated under the management of Ernesto Audoly Società. Management transferred to Interprogress Import & Export in 1962. Sold in 1964 to Imextracom Establissement Liechtenstein and renamed Andromeda. Reflagged to Bulgaria. Sold in 1967 to Navigation Maritime Bulgare, Varna, Bulgaria. Renamed Slavianka in 1971. She was scrapped at Split in April 1972.

== Ponce De Leon ==
Ponce De Leon was built by St. Johns River Shipbuilding Company. Her keel was laid on 15 August 1942. She was launched on 14 March 1943 and delivered on 30 April. She was scrapped at Mobile in October 1962.

== Pontus H. Ross ==
Pontus H. Ross was built by Todd Houston Shipbuilding Company. Her keel was laid on 29 September 1944. She was launched on 2 November and delivered on 13 November. She was scrapped at Portland, Oregon in May 1969.

== Powelton Seam ==
Powelton Seam wasa collier built by Delta Shipbuilding Company. Her keel was laid on 14 March 1945. She was launched on 8 May and delivered on 9 July. Built for the WSA, she was operated under the management of A. H. Bull & Co., New York. Sold to her managers in 1946 and renamed Evelyn. She was scrapped at Hirao in March 1963.

== Prince L.Campbell ==
Prince L. Campbell was built by Oregon Shipbuilding Corporation. Her keel was laid on 10 September 1943. She was launched on 25 September and delivered on 30 September. Laid up in the James River post-war, she was scrapped at Gandia, Spain in December 1970.

== Priscilla Alden ==
Priscilla Alden was built by Bethlehem Fairfield Shipyard. Her keel was laid on 3 October 1943. She was launched as Priscilla Alden on 25 October and completed as Samlouis on 5 November. To the MoWT, operated under the management of Ellerman's Wilson Line. Sold in 1947 to Alva Steamship Co., London and renamed Coralstone. Operated under the management of Navigation & Coal Trade Co. Sold in 1951 to Alvion Steamship Co and reflagged to Panama. Operated under the joint management of Navent Corp. and Navigation & Coal Trade Co. Sold in 1959 to Compania Argentina de Navigation Ultramar, Buenos Aires, Argentina and renamed Esmeralda. She was scrapped at Kaohsiung in November 1968.

== Propus ==
Propus was built by St. Johns River Shipbuilding Company. Her keel was laid on 31 January 1944. She was launched as Frederick Tresca on 29 March and delivered to the United States Navy as Propus on 10 April. She was completed by Merrill-Stevens Drydock & Repair Co., Jacksonville. Returned to WSA in November 1945 and renamed Frederick Tresca. Laid up in the James River. Sold in 1947 to Nicolas G. Nicolaou, Athens and renamed Nicolaou Giorgios. Caught fire in the Red Sea (21°01′N 38°19′E) on 22 May 1951 whilst on a voyage from Darien to Trieste, Italy and was abandoned by her crew. Towed into Suez, Egypt by the American tanker Montebello Hills. Declared a constructive total loss. Sold to Achille Lauro, Naples and renamed Gabbiano. Second-hand diesel engine fitted at Trieste in 1952. She was scrapped at La Spezia in January 1970.

== Psara ==
Psara

Psara was built by Todd Houston Shipbuilding Corporation. Her keel was laid on 31 January 1945. She was launched as Mark A. Davis on 12 March and delivered as Psara on 24 March. To the Greek Government under Lend-Lease. Sold in 1947 to Demetrios & Stamatios Fafalios, Chios. Sold in 1956 to Naftiki Etaira Nea Tych, Piraeus. Sold in 1957 to Nea Thyi Maritime Co, Piraeus. She was scrapped at Osaka in May 1967.

== Pskov ==
Pskov was built by Oregon Shipbuilding Corporation. Her keel was laid on 9 April 1943. She was launched as George L. Shoup on 28 April and delivered as Pskov on 6 May. Transferred to the Soviet Union. She was scrapped at Faslane, United Kingdom in September 1970.

== P. T. Barnum ==
P. T. Barnum was built by California Shipbuilding Corporation. Her keel was laid on 23 April 1943. She was launched on 14 May and delivered on 27 May. She was scrapped at Osaka in June 1961.
