= Juan Ponce de León =

Spanish explorer and conquistador (1474–1521)

Adelantado Juan Ponce de León
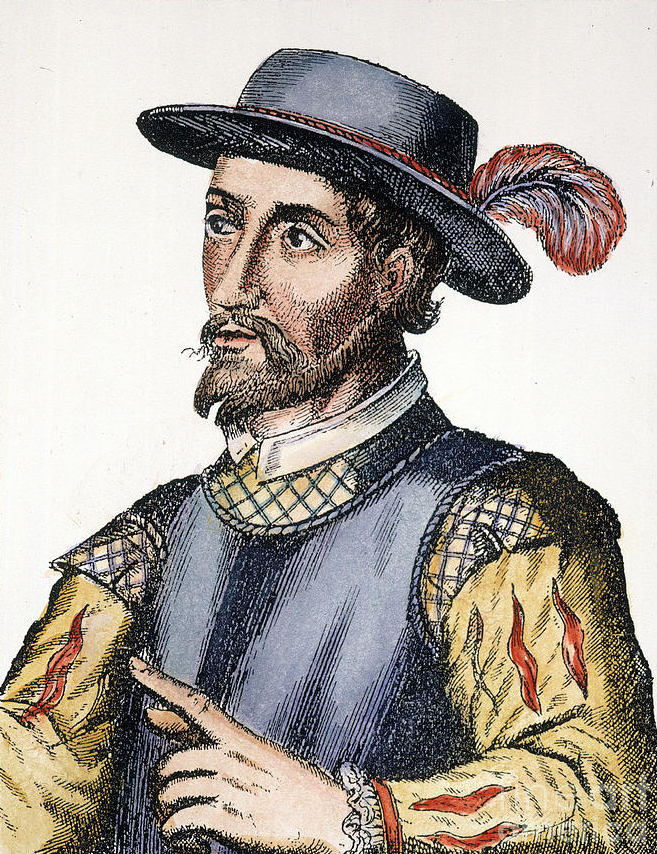
- Engraving depicting Ponce de León, in Torquemada's Monarquía Indiana (1615)

1st, 3rd, and 7th Governor of Puerto Rico
- In office 1508–1509
- Preceded by: Office established
- Succeeded by: Juan Cerón
- In office 1510–1511
- Preceded by: Juan Cerón
- Succeeded by: Juan Cerón
- In office 1515–1519
- Preceded by: Cristóbal de Mendoza
- Succeeded by: Sánchez Velázquez/Antonio de la Gama

Personal details
- Born: c. 1474 Santervás de Campos, Castile
- Died: July 1521 (aged 46–47) Havana, Governorate of Cuba
- Resting place: Cathedral of San Juan Bautista (San Juan, Puerto Rico)
- Spouse: 2
- Relations: Juan Ponce de León II (grandson); Juan Ponce de León y Loayza (great-grandson)
- Children: 3
- Profession: Explorer

Juan Ponce de León (Note: /ˌpɒns də ˈliːən/ PONSS də LEE-ən, UK also /ˌpɒnseɪ də leɪˈɒn/ PON-say də lay-ON, US also /ˌpɒns də liˈoʊn, ˌpɒns(ə) deɪ -/ PONSS də lee-OHN, PONSS(-ə) day -, Spanish: [xwam ˈponθe ðe leˈon].) (c. 1474 – July 1521) was a Spanish explorer and conquistador known for leading the first European expeditions to Puerto Rico in 1508 and Florida in 1513. He was born in Santervás de Campos, Valladolid, Spain, in 1474. Though little is known about his family, he was of noble birth and served in the Spanish military from a young age. He first came to the Americas as a "gentleman volunteer" with Christopher Columbus's second expedition in 1493.

By the early 1500s, Ponce de León was a top military official in the colonial government of Hispaniola, where he helped crush a rebellion of the native Taíno people. He was authorized to explore the neighboring island of Puerto Rico in 1508 and to take office as the first governor of Puerto Rico by appointment of the Spanish crown in 1509. While Ponce de León grew quite wealthy from his plantations and mines, he faced an ongoing legal conflict with Diego Colón, the late Christopher Columbus's son, over the right to govern Puerto Rico. After a long court battle, Colón replaced Ponce de León as governor in 1511. Ponce de León decided to follow the advice of the sympathetic King Ferdinand and explore more of the Caribbean Sea.

In 1513, Ponce de León led the first European expedition to La Florida, which he named during his first voyage to the area. He landed somewhere along Florida's east coast, then charted the Atlantic coast down to the Florida Keys and north along the Gulf coast. Though in popular culture he was supposedly searching for the Fountain of Youth, there is no contemporary evidence to support the story, which most modern historians consider a myth.

Ponce de León returned to Spain in 1514 and was knighted by King Ferdinand, who also reinstated him as the governor of Puerto Rico and authorized him to settle Florida. He returned to the Caribbean in 1515, but plans to organize an expedition to Florida were delayed by the death of King Ferdinand in 1516, after which Ponce de León again traveled to Spain to defend his grants and titles. He did not return to Puerto Rico for two years.

In March 1521, Ponce de León finally returned to Southwest Florida with the first large-scale attempt to establish a Spanish colony in what is now the continental United States. However, the native Calusa people resisted the incursion, and Ponce de Léon was seriously wounded in a skirmish. The colonization attempt was abandoned, and he died from his wounds soon after returning to Cuba in early July. He was interred in Puerto Rico; his tomb is located inside the Cathedral of San Juan Bautista in San Juan.

== Biography ==
=== Spain ===
Juan Ponce de León was born in the village of Santervás de Campos in the northern part of what is now the Spanish province of Valladolid. Although early historians placed his birth in 1460, and this date has been used traditionally, more recent evidence shows he was likely born in 1474. The surname Ponce de León dates from the 13th century. The Ponce de León lineage began with Ponce Vélaz de Cabrera, descendant of count Bermudo Núñez, and Sancha Ponce de Cabrera, daughter of Ponce Giraldo de Cabrera.

Before October 1235, a son of Ponce Vela de Cabrera and his wife Teresa Rodríguez Girón named Pedro Ponce de Cabrera married Aldonza Alfonso, an illegitimate daughter of King Alfonso IX of León. The descendants of this marriage added the "de León" to their patronymic and were known thereafter by the name Ponce de León.

Although the identity of Juan Ponce de León's parents is still a matter of conjecture, according to Fuson and Arnade, citing Puerto Rican historian Aurelio Tió, Pedro Ponce de León and Leonor de Figueroa were most likely the parents of Juan Ponce de León. Thus Ponce appears to have been a member of a distinguished and influential noble family.

His relatives included Rodrigo Ponce de León, Duke of Cádiz, a celebrated figure in the Moorish wars (sometimes known as a "new Cid"), and Juan Ponce de León's first cousin. Aurelio Tió, in his Nuevas fuentes para la historia de Puerto Rico, made a vigorous case for Juan Ponce's aristocratic heritage, determining that Juan Ponce's father was Pedro Ponce de León, the Fourth Lord of Villagarcía, and his mother was Leonor de Figueroa, the daughter of Lorenzo Suárez de Figueroa, Lord of Salvaleón, and María Manuel; consequently Juan Ponce's paternal grandmother, Teresa de Guzmán (Teresa Ponce de León y Guzmán), was La Señora de la Casa Toral, making Juan Ponce a Ponce de León on both sides of his family.

Through this grandmother, Ponce de León was related to another notable family, the Núñez de Guzmáns; a contemporary chronicler, Gonzalo Fernández de Oviedo y Valdés, says that as a young man he served as a page and then as a squire to Pedro Núñez de Guzmán, Knight Commander of the Order of Calatrava. Devereux says Ponce de León probably joined the Spanish campaigns against the Muslims in the Granada War in which the Catholic Monarchs finally conquered in 1492 the Nasrid Kingdom of Granada, the last Muslim polity surviving in the Iberian peninsula. Puerto Rican historian Vicente Murga Sanz states that as the squire of Pedro Núñez de Guzmán, it is possible that Juan Ponce de León fought on the side of Rodrigo Ponce de León at the Battle of Granada. Fernandez de Oviedo writes that when Juan Ponce de León arrived in the Americas he was a military man who had gained his experience in the Granada War, but Arnade cautions, "Without proof the biographers of the conquistador state that he accompanied Pedro Núñez de Guzmán in the war against the Moors during the Granada campaign".

=== Arrival in the New World ===
In September 1493, some 1,200 sailors, colonists, and soldiers joined Christopher Columbus for his second voyage to the New World. Ponce de León, nineteen years old, was able to get passage in this expedition, with Núñez de Guzmán's help, as one of 200 "gentleman volunteers".

The fleet reached the Caribbean in November 1493. They visited several islands before arriving at their primary destination in Hispaniola, and anchored on the coast of a large island the Indigenous people called Boriquen, "the land of the brave lord", which would eventually become known as Puerto Rico. This was Ponce de León's first glimpse of the place that would play a major role in his future. Historians are divided on what he did during the next several years, but it is possible that he returned to Spain at some point and made his way back to Hispaniola with Nicolás de Ovando.

=== Hispaniola ===
In 1502 the newly appointed governor, Nicolás de Ovando, arrived in Hispaniola, with the Spanish Crown expecting him to bring order to a colony in disarray, a task in which he succeeded. Ovando interpreted his instructions as authorizing subjugation of the native Taínos, and consequently authorized the Jaragua massacre in November 1503. In 1504, when Taínos overran a small Spanish garrison in Higüey on the island's eastern side, Ovando assigned Ponce de León to crush the rebellion.

Ponce de León was actively involved in the Higüey massacre, about which friar Bartolomé de las Casas attempted to notify Spanish authorities. Ovando rewarded his victorious commander by appointing him frontier governor of the newly conquered province, then named Higüey also. Ponce de León received a substantial land grant with an encomienda of sufficient Indian labor to farm his new estate.

Ponce de León prospered in this new role. He found a ready market for his farm produce and livestock at nearby Boca de Yuma where Spanish ships stocked supplies before the long voyage back to Spain. In 1505 Ovando authorized Ponce de León to establish a new town in Higüey, which he named Salvaleón. In 1508 the Spanish Crown selected Ponce de León to exploit the goldfields he had discovered in Puerto Rico. He established Spanish settlements near the larger mines at San Germán and Caparra, at which the local Indians were compelled to labor, as well as in the Spanish ranches, under the yoke of the encomienda system.

Around this time, Ponce de León married Leonora, an innkeeper's daughter. They had three daughters, Juana, Isabel and María, and one son, Luis. The large stone house Ponce de León ordered built for his growing family still stands today near the city of San Rafael del Yuma; he named it Salvaleón after his grandmother's estate in Castile.

=== Puerto Rico ===
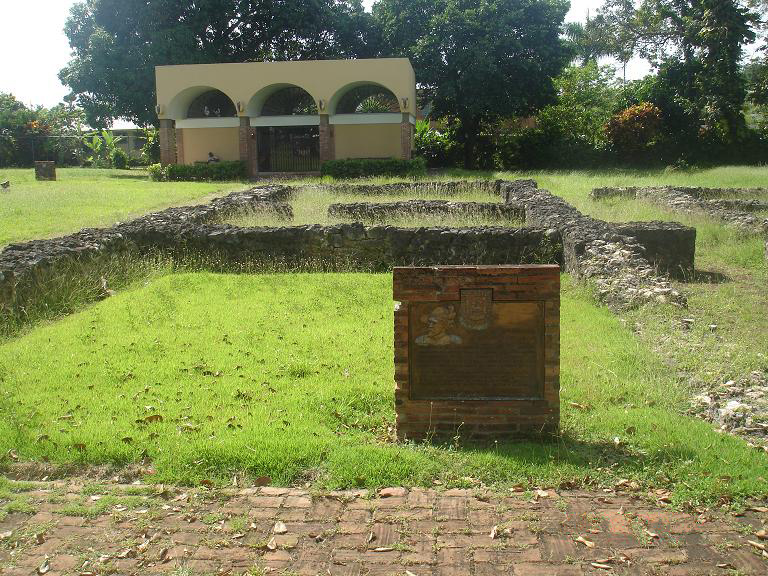
The ruins of Juan Ponce de León's residence at Caparra

As provincial governor, Ponce de León heard stories from Island Caribs who had been captured when they raided Spanish colonies. They told him of gold on the neighboring island of San Juan, now Puerto Rico, which he had first seen as a member of Christopher Columbus's second voyage in 1493, describing a fertile land with much gold to be found in the many rivers. Inspired by the possibility of riches, Ponce de León requested and received permission from Ovando to explore the island.

The official settlement of San Juan by Spaniards is often dated to 1508, when Ponce landed in a caravel with about fifty men on the southern coast of the island, but there is documentation in the Archive of the Indies (Archivo General de Indias) that he had led an expedition there with several hundred men as early as 1506, under orders by Governor Ovando to explore, settle, and conquer the island. Puerto Rican scholar Aurelio Tió wrote two books which contain much archival material concerning Ponce de León, including documentation he discovered in Spain and in Puerto Rico. He writes in detail of the Probanza de Juan González, according to which a temporary base was established on the west coast of Puerto Rico near the Bay of Añasco in 1506. This earlier trip was said to have been done quietly because the Spanish crown in 1504 had commissioned Vicente Yáñez Pinzón to explore the island and build a fort. Pinzón did not fulfill his commission, and it expired in 1507, leaving the way clear for Ponce de León.

His earlier exploration had confirmed the presence of gold and gave him a good understanding of the geography of the island. In 1508, Ferdinand II of Aragon gave permission to Ponce de León for the first official expedition to the island, which the Spanish then called San Juan Bautista. Ponce de León led a small exploratory party to Puerto Rico in 1508 that found placer deposits of gold in the western end of the island. This expedition, consisting of about 50 men in one ship, left Hispaniola on 12 July 1508 and eventually anchored in San Juan Bay, near today's city of San Juan.

Ponce de León searched inland until he found a suitable site about two miles from the bay. Here he erected a storehouse and a fortified house, creating the first settlement in Puerto Rico, Caparra. Although a few crops were planted, the settlers spent most of their time and energy searching for gold. By early 1509 Ponce de León decided to return to Hispaniola. His expedition had collected a good quantity of gold but was running low on food and supplies.

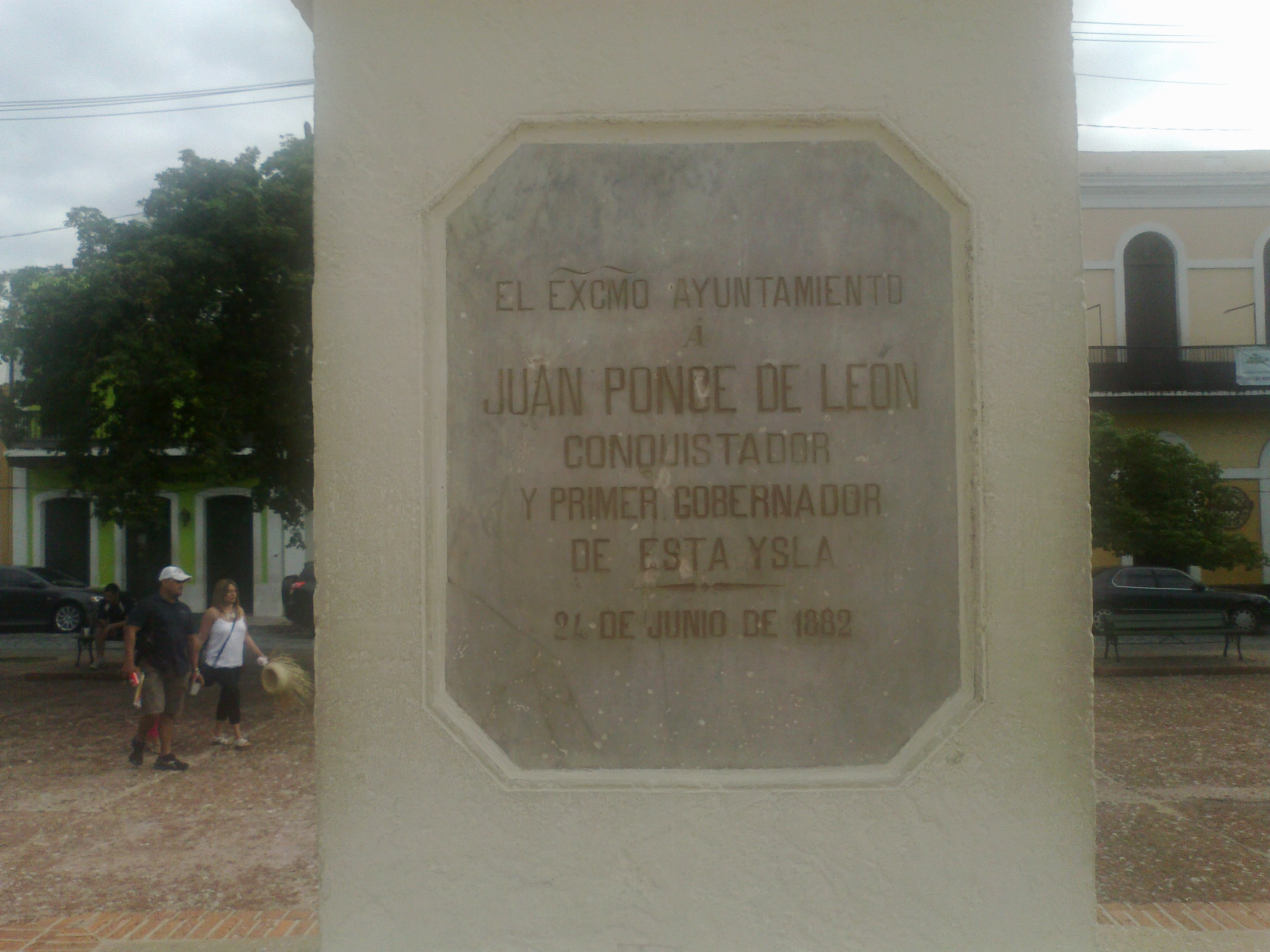
Juan Ponce de León Conquistador monument in Old San Juan, Puerto Rico

The expedition was deemed a great success and Ovando appointed Ponce de León governor of San Juan Bautista. This appointment was later confirmed by Ferdinand II on 14 August 1509. He was instructed to extend the settlement of the island and continue mining for gold. The new governor returned to the island as instructed, bringing with him his wife and children. The rush of Spaniards from Hispaniola wanting to mine gold disrupted the way of life of the Taíno native people.

Back on his island, Ponce de León parceled out the native Taínos among himself and other settlers using the system of forced labor known as encomienda. The Indians were put to work growing food crops and mining for gold. Ponce put those assigned to his personal encomienda, Hacienda Grande, to work searching for gold in the Toa Valley just east of San Juan. Many of the Spaniards treated the Taínos very harshly and death rates were very high. The demand for slaves kidnapped from other islands grew. By June 1511, the Taínos, pushed to the limits of their endurance, began a short-lived rebellion, which was forcibly put down by Ponce de León and a small force of troops armed with crossbows and arquebuses (long guns).

Even as Ponce de León was settling the island of San Juan, significant changes were taking place in the politics and government of the Spanish West Indies. On 10 July 1509, Diego Colón, the son of Christopher Columbus, arrived in Hispaniola as acting Viceroy, replacing Nicolás de Ovando. For several years Diego Colón had been waging a legal battle over his rights to inherit the titles and privileges granted to his father. The Crown regretted the sweeping powers that had been granted to Columbus and his heirs and sought to establish more direct control in the New World. In spite of the Crown's opposition, Colón prevailed in court and Ferdinand was required to appoint him Viceroy.

Although the courts had ordered that Ponce de León should remain in office, Colón circumvented this directive on 28 October 1509 by appointing Juan Ceron chief justice and Miguel Diaz chief constable of the island, effectively overriding the authority of the governor. This situation prevailed until 2 March 1510, when Ferdinand issued orders reaffirming Ponce de León's position as governor. Ponce de León then had Ceron and Diaz arrested and sent back to Spain.

The political struggle between Colón and Ponce de León continued in this manner for the next few years. Ponce de León had influential supporters in Spain and Ferdinand regarded him as a loyal servant. However, Colón's position as Viceroy made him a powerful opponent and eventually it became clear that Ponce de León's position on San Juan was not tenable. Finally, on 28 November 1511, Ceron returned from Spain and was officially reinstated as governor.

=== First voyage to Florida in 1513 ===
Rumors of undiscovered islands to the northwest of Hispaniola had reached Spain by 1511, and Ferdinand was interested in forestalling further exploration and discovery by Colón. In an effort to reward Ponce de León for his services, Ferdinand urged him to seek these new lands outside the authority of Colón. Ponce de León readily agreed to a new venture, and in February 1512 a royal contract was dispatched outlining his rights and authorities to search for "the Islands of Beniny".

The contract stipulated that Ponce de León held exclusive rights to the discovery of Beniny and neighboring islands for the next three years. He would be governor for life of any lands he discovered, but he was expected to finance all costs of exploration and settlement himself. In addition, the contract gave specific instructions for the distribution of gold, Native Americans, and other profits extracted from the new lands; the contract made no mention of a rejuvenating fountain.

Ponce de León equipped three ships at his own expense and set out from Puerto Rico in early March 1513. The Spanish expedition included sixty-five people, among them two free Africans and two enslaved Indigenous people. One of the Africans was Juan Garrido, a free West African who accompanied Ponce de León to Florida. The fullest known account of the expedition comes from Antonio de Herrera y Tordesillas, a Spanish historian who have access to the original ship logs and related sources when preparing his summary of the voyage, published in 1601.

The three ships in this small fleet were the Santiago, the San Cristobal and the Santa Maria de la Consolación. Anton de Alaminos was their chief pilot. He was already an experienced sailor, and would become one of the most respected pilots in the region. After leaving Puerto Rico, they sailed northwest along the great chain of Bahama Islands, known then as the Lucayos.

Herrera wrote that on 27 March 1513, Easter Sunday, they sighted land he described as an island that was unfamiliar to the sailors on the expedition. Because many Spanish seamen were acquainted with the Bahamas, which had been depopulated by slaving ventures, some scholars believe that this "island" was actually Florida, as it was thought to be an island for several years after its formal discovery. Historian and marine archeologist Samuel Turner says that Ponce de León sighted the Florida coast on Easter Sunday of 1513, and that many historians have misinterpreted Herrera's text by claiming it was one of the Bahama Islands Ponce saw on that date. Turner writes that because Beimini is described as an island, they assume that Herrera refers to one of the Bahama Islands, variously proposing that this "island" was Eleuthera, Man-O-War Cay, Great Abaco, or Grand Bahama.

For the next several days the fleet crossed open water until 2 April, when they sighted land which Ponce de León believed was another island. He named it La Florida in recognition of the verdant landscape and because it was the Easter season, which the Spaniards called Pascua Florida (Festival of Flowers). The following day they came ashore to seek information and take possession of this new land.

The precise location of their landing on the Florida coast has been disputed for many years. Some historians believe it occurred at or near St. Augustine, but others prefer a more southerly landing at a small harbor now called Ponce de León Inlet. Some believe that Ponce came ashore even farther south near the present location of Melbourne Beach, a hypothesis first proposed by Douglas Peck, an amateur historian who attempted to reconstruct the track of the voyage sailing in his 33-foot Bermuda-rigged sailboat. Samuel Turner dismisses this theory, pointing out that Ponce's fleet encountered a storm on 30 March, sailing in it for two days, with no indication in Herrera of the wind direction or how strong it was, and that this fact complicates any attempt to reconstruct the voyage (not to mention that Peck's boat was nothing like the Spanish ships). On 2 April, after the weather improved, Ponce's pilot Anton de Alaminos took a navigational fix by the sun at noon in nine fathoms of water with a quadrant or a mariner's astrolabe, and obtained a reading of 30 degrees, 8 minutes of latitude, the coordinate recorded in the ship's log when it was closest to the landing site, as reported by Herrera (who had the original logbook) in 1601. This latitude corresponds to a spot north of St. Augustine between what is now the Guana Tolomato Matanzas National Estuarine Research Reserve and Ponte Vedra Beach. The expedition sailed north for the remainder of the day before anchoring for the night and rowing ashore the next morning.

After remaining in the area of their first landing for about five days, the ships turned south for further exploration of the coast. On 8 April they encountered a current so strong that it pushed them backwards and forced them to seek anchorage. The smallest ship, the San Cristobal, was carried out of sight and lost for two days. This was the first known encounter by Europeans with the Gulf Stream, occurring where it reaches maximum force between the Florida coast and the Bahamas. Because of the powerful boost provided by the current, it would soon become the primary route for eastbound ships leaving the Spanish West Indies bound for Europe.

They continued down the coast hugging the shore to avoid the strong head current. By 4 May the fleet reached and named Biscayne Bay. They took on water at an island they named Santa Marta (now Key Biscayne) and explored the Tequesta Miami mound town at the mouth of the Miami River. The Tequesta people did not engage the Spanish, but instead evacuated into the coastal woodlands. On 15 May they left Biscayne Bay and sailed along the Florida Keys, looking for a passage to head north and explore the west coast of the Florida peninsula.

From a distance the Keys reminded Ponce de León of men who were suffering, so he named them Los Martires (the Martyrs). Eventually they found a gap in the reefs and sailed "to the north and other times to the northeast" until they reached the Florida mainland on 23 May, where they encountered the Calusa, who refused to trade and drove off the Spanish ships by surrounding them with warriors in sea canoes armed with long bows.

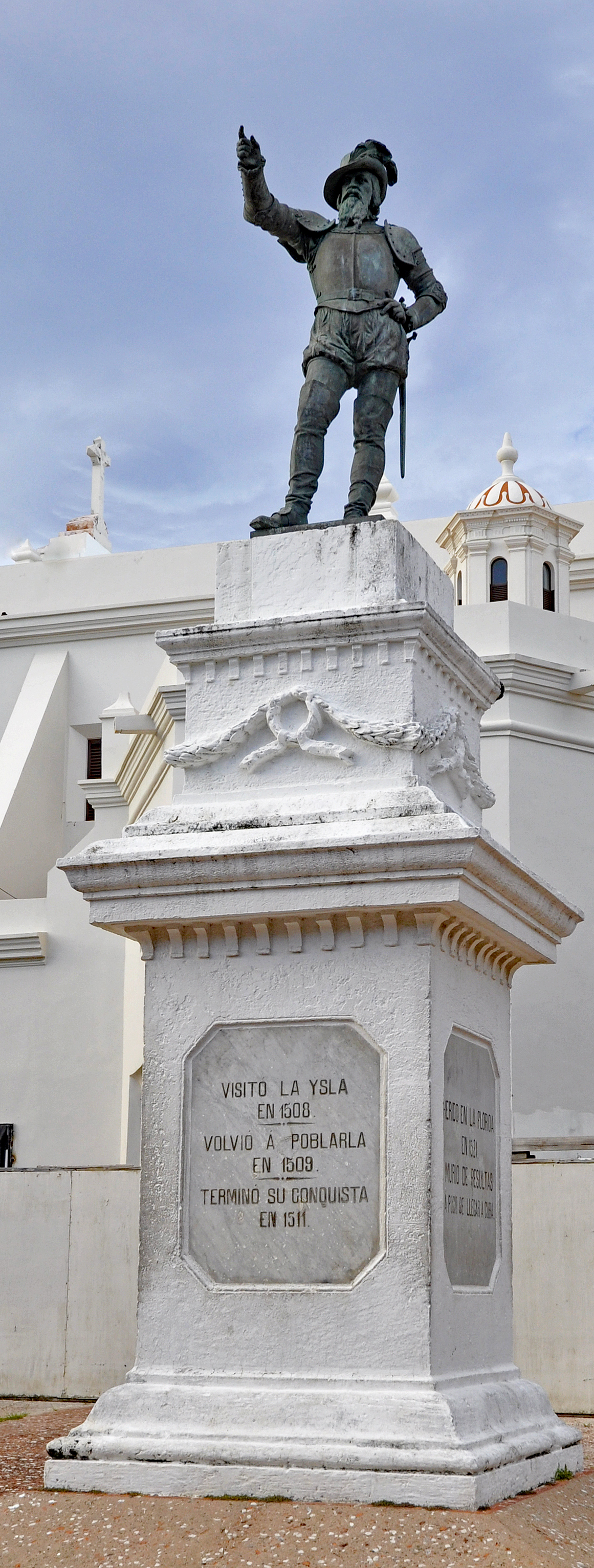
Ponce de León's statue in Plaza San José, San Juan, Puerto Rico

Again, the exact site of their landfall is controversial. The vicinity of Charlotte Harbor is the most commonly identified spot, while some assert a landing further north at Tampa Bay or even Pensacola. Other historians have argued the distances were too great to cover in the available time and the more likely location was Cape Romano or Cape Sable. Here Ponce de León anchored for several days to take on water and repair the ships. They were approached by Calusa, who initially indicated an interest in trading, but relations soon turned hostile.

Several skirmishes followed with casualties on both sides. The Spaniards captured eight Calusa (four men and four women) and seized five war canoes abandoned by the retreating warriors. On 5 June, a final confrontation occurred when some 80 Calusa warriors attacked a party of eleven Spanish sailors. The result was a standoff with neither party willing to come within striking distance of their opponents' weapons.

On 14 June they set sail again looking for a chain of islands in the west that had been described by their captives. They reached the Dry Tortugas on 21 June. There they captured giant sea turtles, Caribbean monk seals, and thousands of seabirds. From these islands they sailed southwest in an apparent attempt to circle around Cuba and return home to Puerto Rico. Failing to take into account the powerful currents pushing them eastward, they struck the northeast shore of Cuba and were initially confused about their location.

Once they regained their bearings, the fleet retraced their route east along the Florida Keys and around the Florida peninsula, reaching Grand Bahama on 8 July. They were surprised to come across another Spanish ship, piloted by Diego Miruelo, who was either on a slaving voyage or had been sent by Diego Colón to spy on Ponce de León. Shortly thereafter Miruelo's ship was wrecked in a storm and Ponce de León rescued the stranded crew.

From here the little fleet disbanded. Ponce de León tasked the Santa Maria with further exploration while he returned home with the rest of crew. Ponce de León reached Puerto Rico on 19 October 1513 after having been away for almost eight months. The other ship, after further explorations returned safely on 20 February 1514.

Although Ponce de León is widely credited with the discovery of Florida, he almost certainly was not the first European to reach the peninsula. Spanish slave expeditions had been regularly raiding the Bahamas since 1494 and there is some evidence that one or more of these slavers made it as far as the shores of Florida. Another piece of evidence that others came before Ponce de León is the Cantino Map from 1502, which shows a peninsula near Cuba that looks like Florida's and includes characteristic place names.

==== Fountain of Youth ====
According to a popular legend, Ponce de León discovered Florida while searching for the Fountain of Youth. Though stories of vitality-restoring waters were known on both sides of the Atlantic long before Ponce de León, the story of his searching for them was not attached to him until after his death. In his Historia general y natural de las Indias of 1535, Gonzalo Fernández de Oviedo y Valdés wrote that Ponce de León was looking for the waters of Bimini.

A similar account appears in Francisco López de Gómara's Historia general de las Indias of 1551. Then in 1575, Hernando de Escalante Fontaneda, a shipwreck survivor who had lived with the Native Americans of Florida for 17 years, published his memoir in which he locates the waters called the River Jordan (flowing out of Eden) in Florida, and says that Ponce de León was supposed to have looked for them there.

Though Fontaneda doubted that Ponce de León had really gone to Florida looking for the waters, the account was included in the Historia general de los hechos de los castellanos of Antonio de Herrera y Tordesillas of 1615. Most historians hold that the search for gold and the expansion of the Spanish Empire were far more imperative than any potential search for such a fountain.

=== Between voyages ===
Upon his return to Puerto Rico, Ponce de León found the island in turmoil. A party of Caribs from a neighboring island had attacked the settlement of Caparra, killed several Spaniards and burned it to the ground. Ponce de León's own house was destroyed and his family narrowly escaped. Colón used the attack as a pretext for renewing hostilities against the local Taíno tribes. The explorer suspected that Colón was working to further undermine his position on the island and perhaps even to take his claims for the newly discovered Florida.

Ponce de León decided he should return to Spain and personally report the results of his recent expedition. He left Puerto Rico in April 1514 and was warmly received by Ferdinand when he arrived at court in Valladolid. There he was knighted, and given a personal coat of arms, becoming the first conquistador to receive these honors. He also visited Casa de Contratación in Seville, which was the central bureaucracy and clearinghouse for all of Spain's activities in the New World. The Casa took detailed notes of his discoveries and added them to the Padrón Real, a master map which served as the basis for official navigation charts provided to Spanish captains and pilots.

During his stay in Spain, a new contract was drawn up for Ponce de León confirming his rights to settle and govern Beniny and Florida, which was then presumed to be an island. In addition to the usual directions for sharing gold and other valuables with the king, the contract was one of the first to stipulate that the Requerimiento was to be read to the inhabitants of the islands prior to their conquest. Ponce de León was also ordered to organize an armada for the purpose of attacking and subduing the Caribs, who continued to attack Spanish settlements in the Caribbean.

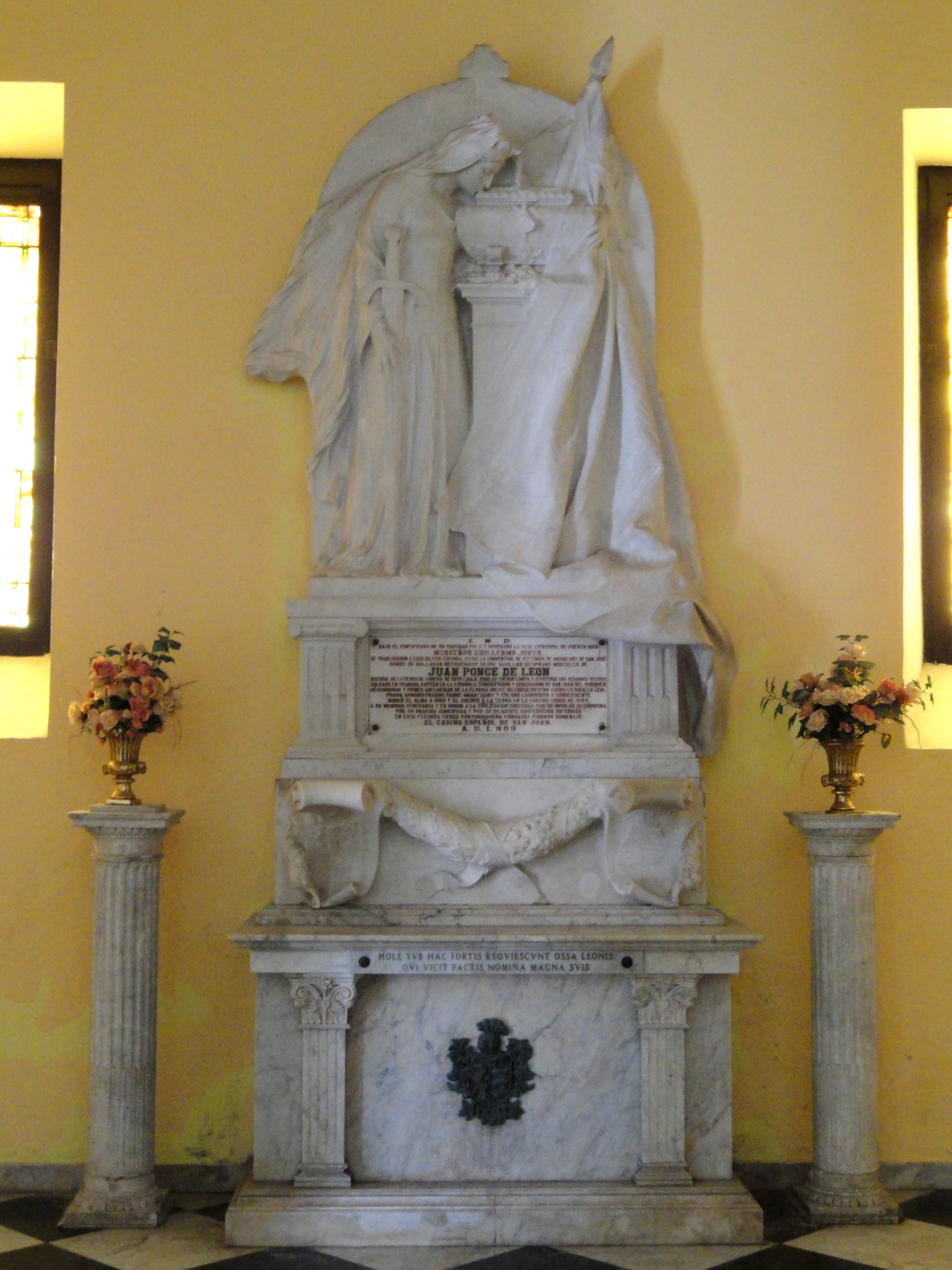
The Tomb of Ponce de León in the Cathedral of San Juan Bautista in San Juan, Puerto Rico

Three ships were purchased for his armada and after repairs and provisioning Ponce de León left Spain on 14 May 1515 with his little fleet. The record of his activities against the Caribs is vague. There was one engagement in Guadeloupe on his return to the area and possibly two or three other encounters. The campaign came to an abrupt end in 1516 when Ferdinand died. The king had been a strong supporter and Ponce de León felt it was imperative he return to Spain and defend his privileges and titles. He did receive assurances of support from Cardinal Francisco Jiménez de Cisneros, the regent appointed to govern Castile, but it was nearly two years before he was able to return home to Puerto Rico.

Meanwhile, there had been at least two unauthorized voyages to "his" Florida, both ending in repulsion by the native Calusa or Tequesta warriors. Ponce de León realized he had to act soon if he was to maintain his claim.

=== Last voyage to Florida ===
In early 1521, Ponce de León organized a colonizing expedition consisting of some 200 men, including priests, farmers and artisans, 50 horses and other domestic animals, and farming implements carried on two ships. The expedition landed somewhere on the coast of southwest Florida, likely in the vicinity of Charlotte Harbor or the Caloosahatchee River, areas which Ponce de León had visited in his earlier voyage to Florida.

Before the settlement could be established, the colonists were attacked by the Calusa, the indigenous people who dominated southern Florida and whose principal town was nearby. Ponce de León was wounded in the skirmish when an arrow struck his thigh, and he died in the first week of July 1521, probably from an infection caused by the arrow.

The expedition immediately abandoned the colonization attempt and sailed to Havana, Cuba, where Ponce de León soon died of his wounds. He was buried in Puerto Rico, in the crypt of San José Church from 1559 to 1836, when his remains were exhumed and transferred to the Cathedral of San Juan Bautista. Inscribed on the side panel of the altar-tomb in his mausoleum are these words in Latin: "MOLE SVB HAC FORTIS REQVIESCVNT OSSA LEONIS OVI VICIT FACTIS NOMINA MAGNA SVIS" ("Under this structure rest the bones of a lion, more for his great deeds than for his name").

== Legacy and honors ==
- The World War II Liberty Ship SS Ponce De Leon was named in his honor.

== See also ==
- Agüeybaná I
- Agüeybaná II
- Becerrillo, a dog owned by Juan Ponce de León
- Hayuya
- History of the Americas
- Jumacao

== Bibliography ==
- Alegre-Carvajal, Esther (2014). Las villas ducales como tipología urbana (in Spanish). Editorial UNED. ISBN 978-84-362-6876-8.
- Allen, John Logan (1997). North American Exploration. University of Nebraska Press. p. 210. ISBN 978-0-8032-1015-8.
- Arnade, Charles W. (1967). Tebeau, Charlton W (ed.). "Who Was Juan Ponce de Leon?". Tequesta: The Journal of the Historical Association of Southern Florida. 1 (27): 29–58.
- Anderson-Córdova, Karen F. (2005). "The Aftermath of Conquest: The Indians of Puerto Rico during the Early Sixteenth Century". In Siegel, Peter E. (ed.). Ancient Borinquen: Archaeology and Ethnohistory of Native Puerto Rico. University of Alabama Press. ISBN 978-0-8173-5238-7.
- Anderson-Córdova, Karen F. (2017). Surviving Spanish Conquest: Indian Fight, Flight, and Cultural Transformation in Hispaniola and Puerto Rico. University of Alabama Press. ISBN 978-0-8173-1946-5.
- Armstrong, Catherine; Chmielewski, Laura M. (2013). The Atlantic Experience: Peoples, Places, Ideas. Bloomsbury Publishing. ISBN 978-1-137-40434-3.
- Carriazo Rubio, Juan Luis (2005). "Literatura y rivalidad familiar en el linaje de los Ponce de León a fines del siglo XV". Actas del IX Congreso Internacional de la Asociación Hispánica de Literatura Medieval (in Spanish). 2: 66.
- Claussen, Samuel A. (2020). Chivalry and Violence in Late Medieval Castile. Boydell & Brewer. ISBN 978-1-78327-546-5.
- Davis, T. Frederick (1935). "History of Juan Ponce de Leon's Voyages to Florida". Florida Historical Quarterly. 14 (1).
- Devereux, Anthony Q. (1993). Juan Ponce de Leon, King Ferdinand, and the Fountain of Youth. Spartanburg, South Carolina: The Reprint Company, Publishers. ISBN 0871524643.
- Floyd, Troy (1973). The Columbus Dynasty in the Caribbean, 1492–1526. Albuquerque: University of New Mexico Press. p. 135. ISBN 9780826302830.
- Fuson, Robert Henderson (2000). Juan Ponce de León and the Spanish Discovery of Puerto Rico and Florida. McDonald & Woodward Publishing Company. ISBN 978-0-939923-84-7.
- Goodwin, Robert (2019). América: The Epic Story of Spanish North America, 1493–1898. Bloomsbury Publishing USA. ISBN 978-1-63286-724-7.
- Greenberger, Robert (2005). Juan Ponce de Leon: The Exploration of Florida and the Search for the Fountain of Youth. The Rosen Publishing Group. p. 80. ISBN 978-0-8239-3627-4.
- Hoffman, Paul E. (February 2000). "Ponce de León, Juan (1474–1521), Spanish explorer and discoverer of Florida". American National Biography Online. Oxford University Press. doi:10.1093/anb/9780198606697.article.2000274.
- Kessel, John L. (2003). Spain in the Southwest: A Narrative History of Colonial New Mexico, Arizona, Texas, and California. University of Oklahoma Press. ISBN 978-1928874201.
- Lawson, Edward W. (1946). The Discovery of Florida and Its Discoverer Juan Ponce de Leon. Lawson. Reprint: ISBN 978-1-258-92984-8.
- Marley, David (2008). Wars of the Americas: a chronology of armed conflict in the Western Hemisphere, 1492 to the present. ABC-CLIO. pp. 9–11. ISBN 978-1-59884-100-8.
- Morison, Samuel Eliot (1974). The European Discovery of America: The Southern Voyages A.D. 1492–1616. Oxford University Press.
- Manucy, Albert; Torres-Reyes, Ricardo (1979) [1973]. Puerto Rico and The Forts of Old San Juan. The Chatham Press. ISBN 978-0-912627-62-5.
- Oviedo, Gonzalo Fernández de (1851). Historia general y natural de las Indias. Vol. Part 2, Book 16. Imprenta de la Real Academia de la Historia.
- Peck, Douglas T. (1993). Ponce de León and the Discovery of Florida: The Man, the Myth, and the Truth. Pogo Press. ISBN 978-1-880654-02-6.
- Perea, Salvador (1972). Historia de Puerto Rico, 1537–1700 (in Spanish). Instituto de Cultura Puertorriqueña.
- Pickett, Margaret F.; Pickett, Dwayne W. (2014). The European Struggle to Settle North America: Colonizing Attempts by England, France and Spain, 1521–1608. McFarland. ISBN 978-0-7864-6221-6.
- Richards, John F. (31 December 2019). "Part III. The Americas". The Unending Frontier: 307–460. doi:10.1525/9780520939356-007. ISBN 9780520939356. S2CID 226777222.
- Rouse, Irving (1992). The Tainos: Rise and Decline of the People Who Greeted Columbus. Yale University Press. ISBN 978-0-300-16183-0.
- Rubio, Juan Luis Carriazo (2003). La Casa de Arcos entre Sevilla y la frontera de Granada (1374–1474) (in Spanish). Universidad de Sevilla. ISBN 978-84-472-0761-9.
- Scammell, G. V. (2018). The World Encompassed: The First European Maritime Empires c. 800–1650. Routledge. ISBN 978-1-351-01469-4.
- Schimmer, Russell (2015). "Puerto Rico | Genocide Studies Program". gsp.yale.edu. Archived from the original on 18 December 2015.
- Slavicek, Louise Chipley (2009). Juan Ponce de León. Infobase Publishing. ISBN 978-1-4381-0684-7.
- Steigman, Jonathan D. (2005). La Florida Del Inca and the Struggle for Social Equality in Colonial Spanish America. University of Alabama Press. p. 33. ISBN 978-0-8173-5257-8.
- Sterling, Eric (2003). "Ponce de León, Juan (1474–1521)". In Speake, Jennifer (ed.). Literature of Travel and Exploration: G to P. Taylor & Francis. ISBN 978-1-57958-424-5.
- Swanton, John Reed (1922). Early History of the Creek Indians and Their Neighbors. U.S. Government Printing Office. p. 334.
- Thomas, Hugh (2013). Rivers of Gold: The Rise of the Spanish Empire, from Columbus to Magellan. Random House Publishing Group. ISBN 978-0-8041-5214-3.
- Tió, Aurelio (1961). Nuevas fuentes para la historia de Puerto Rico : documentos inéditos o poco conocidos cuyos originales se encuentran en el Archivo General de Indias en la ciudad de Seville, España. San Germán, Puerto Rico: Ediciones de la Universidad Interamericana de Puerto Rico.
- Tió, Aurelio (31 December 1971). "Doña Leonor Ponce de León: la primera puertorriqueña" (PDF). Boletín de la Academia Puertorriqueña de la Historia. II (7).
- Torres Sevilla-Quiñones de León, Margarita Cecilia (1999). Linajes nobiliarios de León y Castilla: Siglos IX–XIII (in Spanish). Salamanca: Junta de Castilla y León, Consejería de educación y cultura. ISBN 84-7846-781-5.
- Turner, Samuel P. (3–6 May 2012). "The Caribbean World of Juan Ponce de León and His Discovery of Florida" (Paper presented at the Culturally La Florida Conference, St. Augustine, Florida).
- Turner, Samuel (2013). "Juan Ponce de León and the Discovery of Florida Reconsidered". The Florida Historical Quarterly. 92 (1): 1–31. ISSN 0015-4113.
- Vilches, Elvira (2010). New World Gold: Cultural Anxiety and Monetary Disorder in Early Modern Spain. University of Chicago Press. ISBN 978-0-226-85619-3.
- Villatoro, Manuel P. (23 November 2021). "Contra la Leyenda Negra: la mentira de Ponce de León y la fuente de la eterna juventud". ABC (in Spanish). Archived from the original on 23 November 2021.
- Weddle, Robert S. (1985). Spanish Sea: The Gulf of Mexico in North American Discovery, 1500–1685. Texas A&M University Press. ISBN 978-0-89096-211-4.
- Wyman, Patrick (2021). The Verge: Reformation, Renaissance, and Forty Years that Shook the World. Hachette. ISBN 978-1-5387-0117-1.

Preceded by none	Governor of Puerto Rico; 1508–1511	Succeeded by Juan Cerón
Preceded by Cristóbal de Mendoza	Governor of Puerto Rico; 1515–1519	Succeeded by Sánchez Velázquez
