= Statue of Juan Ponce de León =

Statue formerly in San Juan, Puerto Rico

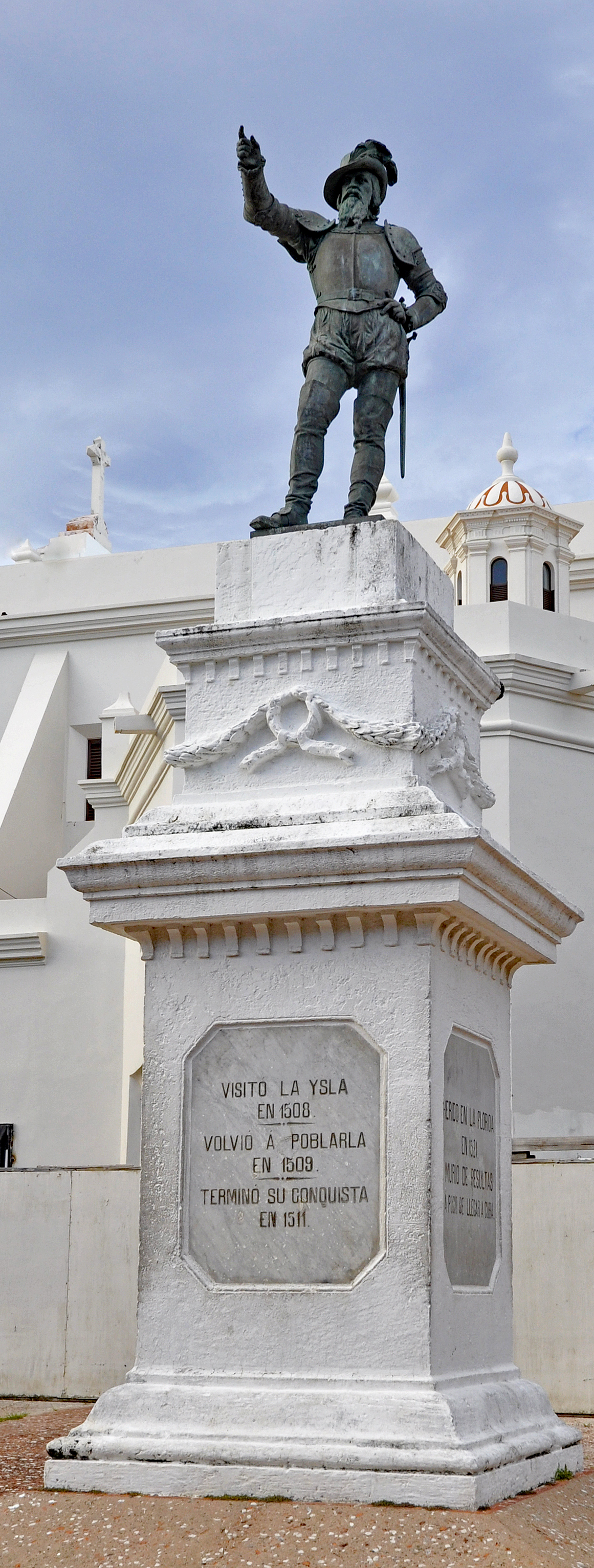
- Artist: C. Bupert
- Year: 1882
- Location: Plaza de San José, Old San Juan

A statue of Juan Ponce de León was erected in the Plaza de San José in San Juan, Puerto Rico, in 1882. In 2022, the statue was vandalized and knocked down by protestors but was quickly reinstalled.

== History ==
The statue was made from cannon captured from the British in 1797 following the Battle of San Juan, a failed attack on Puerto Rico. It was made in 1882 in New York, in the United States. The King of Spain, Alfonso XII, contributed funds toward the erection of the statue.

A copy was erected in 1923 in St. Augustine, Florida, in the United States.

=== Toppling and restoration ===
The statue was toppled in 2022. This occurred a day before the visit of the Spanish king, Felipe VI, to commemorate the 500th anniversary of the foundation of San Juan.

It was reported that the Boriken Libertarian Forces claimed responsibility for the damage to the statue. The group said in a statement that "Faced with the visit of the King of Spain, Felipe VI, to Puerto Rico and the escalation of 'gringo' invaders taking over our lands, we want to send a clear message: neither kings nor 'gringo' invaders".

The statue was repaired and reinstalled less than 24 hours after its toppling. Miguel Romero, the mayor of San Juan, defended the reinstallation of the statue. "Freedom of expression is protected, but what cannot be protected is vandalism. I believe vandalism is the most cowardly form of expression," he said.
