= Santervás de Campos =

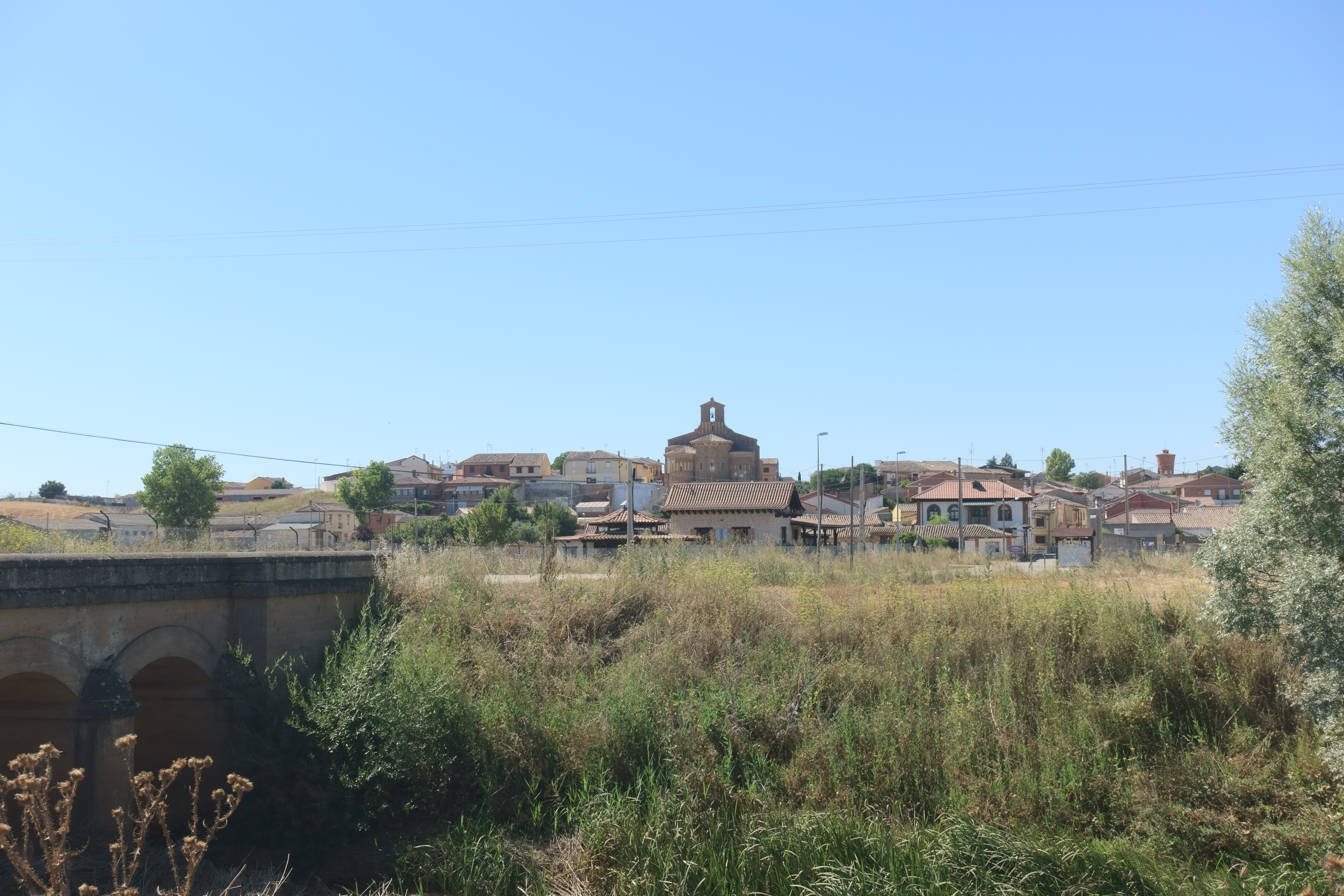

- Flag Coat of arms

- Location in Spain
- Coordinates: 42°13′N 5°6′W
- Country: Spain
- Autonomous community: Castile and León
- Province: Valladolid
- Comarca: Tierra de Campos

Area
  - Total: 54.11 km^{2} (20.89 sq mi)

Population (2025-01-01)
  - Total: 100
  - Density: 1.8/km^{2} (4.8/sq mi)
- Demonym: Santervaseños
- Time zone: UTC+1 (CET)
  - Summer (DST): UTC+2 (CEST)
- Website: Official website

Santervás de Campos is a municipality located in the province of Valladolid, Castile and León, Spain. As of 2009, the municipality has a population of 137.

== History ==
At the beginning of the 8th century, the Tierra de Campos region was practically uninhabited. It was at the beginning of the 9th century that repopulation began with people from the mountains and Mozarabs.

In a list of places first mentioned in the 11th century, we see Villa Citti appear, possibly established at the end of the 10th or beginning of the 11th century. By the beginning of the 12th century, it already appears as an inn or hospital, its name partly ceding its name to Saint Herbás. This would mean that the hospice functioned as a Christian community with monks, reflected in the name of the parish and the place, in honor of the 2nd-century martyr saints, Saints Gervasius and Protasius.

The exact location of the hospice and its purpose are attested to by various documents from that period and later: In 985, Bermudo II of León confirmed to the See of León some villas in the Campos Góticos, in the Araduey and Cea valleys, in Valmadrigal. In 1066, Villa Citti was established as a hospice, and in 1130, the villa was named Villa Citti and the parish Saint Gervasius.

Important for the site was the historic moment of the signing of the donation that Sancha made to the Abbey of Sahagún of the Priory of Santervás and its estate. Here begins the true documented history of Santervás. With the advice and permission of his brother, Alfonso VII of León, granted Sahagún its usufruct without ownership. The abbot of Sahagún would be the lord of the place, who would appoint or dismiss the superior of San Gervasio. The donation was as pious as it was self-serving, because it yielded the Infanta 250 gold maravedís. But the protocol of signatures is historic because of the figures involved: the primate of Toledo, the bishops of Segovia and Palencia, the bishop-elect of Oviedo, the archbishoprics of Santiago de Compostela and Mondoñedo, Counts Rodrigo Martínez and Suero Vermúdez, high-ranking court officials, stewards, merinos, and other prominent names in the lands of León. It was signed at the monastery of Sahagún on 15 May 1130. Perhaps time will one day reveal the secrets surrounding the Benedictine priory of Santervás, which burned down on the night of 19-20 November 1844.

Before the current division of provinces, which dates back more or Less unchanged from 1833, the parish of Santervás de Campos belonged to the Diocese of Palencia according to the old historical provincial divisions of the Crown of Castile, and the later provincial divisions (or intendancies) of the House of Habsburg.

In the 16th and 17th centuries, several residents of Santervás de Campos emigrated to the Americas. Marcos de Escobar went to Peru in 1626, and Juan Ponce de León and Hernán Ponce de León in 1511.

The town has gradually lost population and importance, becoming a small village, although in the past, it was the birthplace of important figures, such as the conquistador Juan Ponce de León, discoverer of Florida and consequently what became the United States.

In the mid-19th century, the town had a recorded population of 475 inhabitants. It is described in the thirteenth volume of Pascual Madoz's "Geographical-Statistical-Historical Dictionary of Spain and its Overseas Possessions" (1849) as follows:

- "SANTERVAS DE CAMPOS: a town with a town hall in the province, territorial court, and captaincy general of Valladolid (12 leagues), judicial district of Villalón (2), diocese of León (11): situated on the right bank of the Valderaduey River, on a small slope in the valley called Valmadrigal, it enjoys good ventilation and a temperate and healthy climate. It has 130 houses; the town hall, a primary school attended by 40 students of both sexes, endowed with 1,100 reales; a parish church (Saints Gervasius and Protasius) served by a priest and a sacristan. The district borders those of Melgar de Arriba, Villacarlon, Vega de Ruiponce and Melgar de Abajo; within it are several springs of good water, a hermitage (the Most Holy Christ of Mercy), the Villela depot and the ruins of a priory dependent on the former Benedictine monastery of Sahagun; it was burned and reduced to ashes on the night of November 19-20, 1844. The land, fertilized by the Valderaduey, is of good quality. Roads: the local roads and the carriage road that leads to Zamora. Mail is received and dispatched in Villalon and Villada. Products: pure wheat, meslin, barley, rye, oats, legumes, potatoes, wine, and pasture, which support sheep, cattle, and mules; there is hunting of partridges and hares; fish."

During a trade mission to Spain, the Governor of Puerto Rico Luis Fortuño, presided over a ceremony here on 21 January 2011, commemorating the Quincentennial of the Governorship of Ponce de León, the United States territory's first Governor and discoverer of Florida and the continental United States, in which a statue of that municipality's famous explorer was unveiled.

== Demographics ==
Demographic evolution of Santervas de Campos
1991	1996	2001	2004	2010
199	173	156	148	141

== Notable natives and residents ==
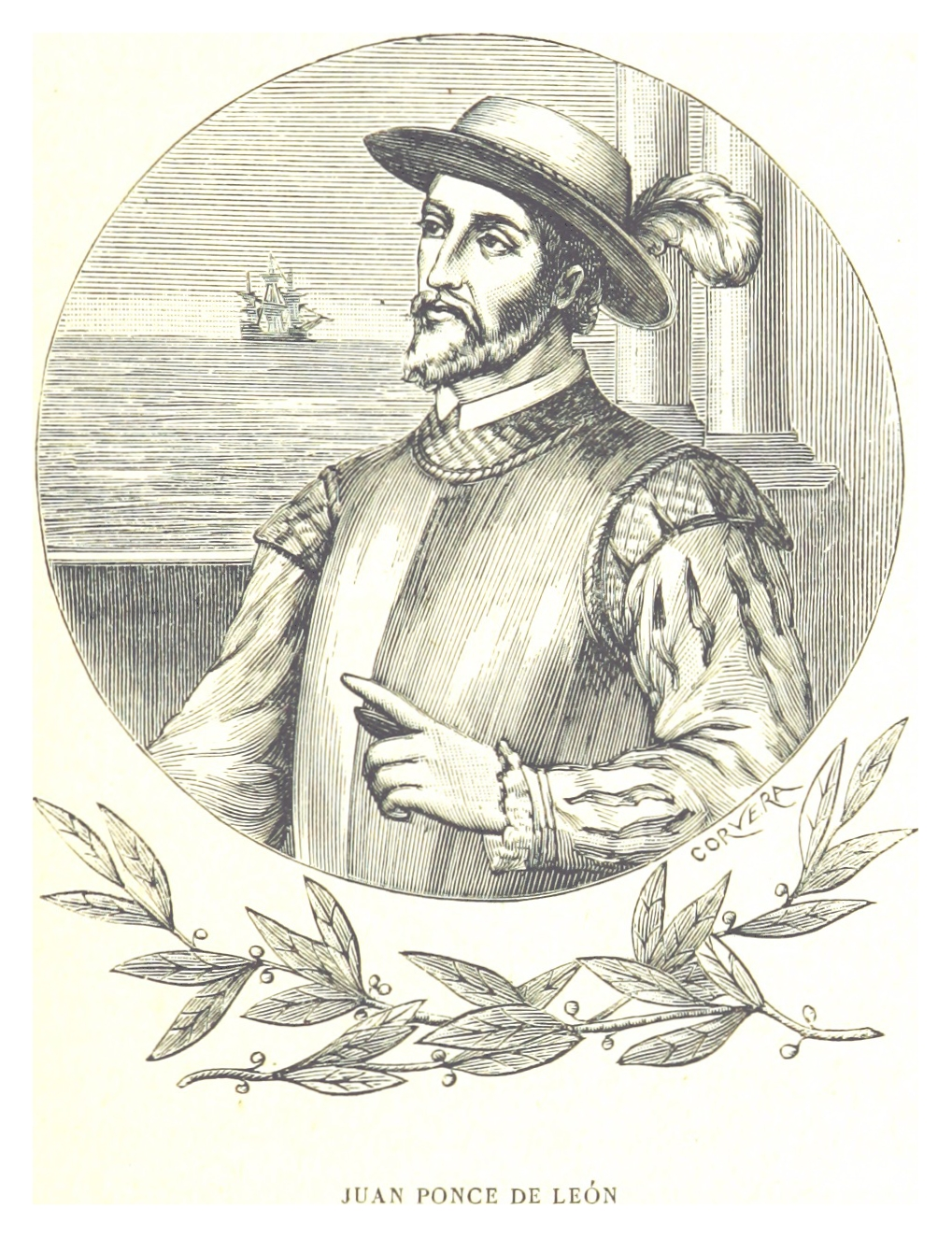
Juan Ponce de León (Santervás de Campos, Valladolid). He was one of the first Europeans to arrive in what is today the United States; leading the first European expedition to Florida, which he named.

- Juan Ponce de León, Spanish explorer, one of the first explorers of Florida, and conqueror & first governor of Puerto Rico.
- Francisco de Villagra (1511 - 1563): conquistador and three-time governor of Chile.
- Bartolomé Santos de Risoba (1582 - 1657): Bishop of Almería, León y Sigüenza.

== See also ==
- Cuisine of the province of Valladolid
