= Juan Cerón =

Spanish conquistador and governor of Puerto Rico

2nd and 4th Governor of Puerto Rico
- In office 28 October 1509 – 2 March 1510
- Monarch: Joanna
- Regent: Ferdinand II of Aragón
- Governor of the Indies: Nicolás de Ovando; Diego Columbus
- Preceded by: Juan Ponce de León
- Succeeded by: Juan Ponce de León
- In office 28 November 1511 – 2 June 1512
- Monarch: Joanna
- Regent: Ferdinand II of Aragón
- Viceroy of the Indies: Diego Columbus
- Preceded by: Juan Ponce de León
- Succeeded by: Rodrigo Moscoso

Personal details
- Profession: Conquistador

Juan Cerón was a Spanish conquistador who served as the second and fourth governor of Puerto Rico from 1509 to 1510, and 1511 to 1512. He was aligned with Diego Columbus and opposed to Juan Ponce de León.

== Biography ==
Cerón arrived in Puerto Rico in 1509. He was aligned with Diego Columbus and was appointed to political officers by Columbus.

Cerón's legacy in the history of the island is tainted by the rivalries between Nicolas de Ovando and Columbus. When Columbus retook possession of his father's title of "Admiral of the Seas" and the governorship of Hispaniola in 1509, he dispatched Cerón to Puerto Rico with the title of Alcalde Mayor to replace Ovando's favorite, Juan Ponce de León.

Cerón took office as governor on 28 October 1509 while his brother Martín was made alguacil mayor. He instituted a new repartimiento against the indigenous population and took away natives that were assigned to colonists by de León. The monarchy of Spain gave Cerón permission to enslave all indigenous people who were captured in combat. King Ferdinand II of Aragon appointed de León as captain governor on 2 March 1510, and de León arrested the Cerón brothers on 10 July before sending them to Spain.

Távora was built by Cristóbal de Sotomayor in 1509, but moved the settlement in 1510 due to indigenous opposition. Cerón constructed a new city near the former site of Távora and named it San Germán.

Columbus restored Cerón as governor. A second repartimiento was instituted by Cerón on 25 July 1511, and ordered the indigienious population to work in gold mines.

Cerón's governorship did not end well; complaints about his handling of the Repartimiento of Indians prompted the Crown to remove him and reinstall Ponce de León as governor in 1513.

== Works cited ==
=== Books ===
- Altman, Ida; Wheat, David (2019). The Spanish Caribbean and the Atlantic World in the Long Sixteenth Century. University of Nebraska Press. ISBN 9780803299573.
- Anderson-Córdova, Karen (2017). Surviving Spanish Conquest: Indian Fight, Flight, and Cultural Transformation in Hispaniola and Puerto Rico. University of Alabama Press. ISBN 9780817390907.
- Oliver, Jose (2009). Caciques and Cemi Idols: The Web Spun by Taino Rulers Between Hispaniola and Puerto Rico. University of Alabama Press. ISBN 9780817381172.
- Siegel, Peter (2009). Ancient Borinquen: Archaeology and Ethnohistory of Native Puerto Rico. University of Alabama Press. ISBN 9780817381509.
- Stone, Erin (2021). Captives of Conquest: Slavery in the Early Modern Spanish Caribbean. University of Pennsylvania Press. ISBN 9780812253108.

=== Journals ===
- Turner, Samuel (2020). "Antón Alaminos, Juan Ponce de León and a 1513-1514 European Discovery of Mexico". The Florida Historical Quarterly. 99 (1). Florida Historical Society: 1–52. doi:10.2307/27139406. JSTOR 27139406.
- Turner, Samuel (2013). "Juan Ponce de León and the Discovery of Florida Reconsidered". The Florida Historical Quarterly. 92 (1). Florida Historical Society: 1–31. doi:10.2307/43487548. JSTOR 43487548.
