= SS Patrick B. Whalen =

World War II Liberty ship of the United States

History

United States
- Name: Patrick B. Whalen
- Namesake: Patrick B. Whalen
- Ordered: as type (EC2-S-C1) hull, MC hull 2404
- Builder: J.A. Jones Construction, Brunswick, Georgia
- Cost: $1,044,343
- Yard number: 189
- Way number: 1
- Laid down: 29 January 1945
- Launched: 15 March 1945
- Sponsored by: Mrs. Leo W. Regan
- Completed: 30 March 1945
- Identification: Call Signal: ANMY
- Fate: Sold for commercial use, 19 July 1949

United States
- Name: Christiam; Bostonian; Manhattan
- Operator: Atl. Marine Transport Co.
- Acquired: 19 July 1949
- Fate: Sold, April 1952

United States
- Operator: National Transocean Carrier, Inc.
- Acquired: April 1952
- Fate: Sold, November 1952

United States
- Name: Seadragon
- Operator: Phoenix Steamship Corp.
- Acquired: November 1952
- Fate: Sold, July 1953

United States
- Name: Charles C. Dunaif
- Operator: Navigator Steamship Corp.
- Acquired: July 1953
- Fate: Sold, July 1958

United States
- Operator: Cargo Ships & Tankers, Inc.
- Acquired: July 1958
- Fate: Sold, June 1961

Liberia
- Name: Wilderness
- Acquired: June 1961
- Fate: Sold, March 1967
- Notes: Reflagged for US, 4 May 1962

United States
- Name: Debbie Mae
- Operator: Debbie Mae Shipping Corp.
- Acquired: March 1967
- Fate: Sold for scrapping, May 1967

General characteristics
- Class & type: Liberty ship; type EC2-S-C1, standard
- Tonnage: 10,865 LT DWT; 7,176 GRT
- Displacement: 3,380 long tons (3,434 t) (light); 14,245 long tons (14,474 t) (max)
- Length: 441 feet 6 inches (135 m) oa; 416 feet (127 m) pp; 427 feet (130 m) lwl
- Beam: 57 feet (17 m)
- Draft: 27 ft 9.25 in (8.4646 m)
- Installed power: 2 × Oil fired 450 °F (232 °C) boilers, operating at 220 psi (1,500 kPa); 2,500 hp (1,900 kW)
- Propulsion: 1 × triple-expansion steam engine, (manufactured by General Machinery Corp., Hamilton, Ohio); 1 × screw propeller
- Speed: 11.5 knots (21.3 km/h; 13.2 mph)
- Capacity: 562,608 cubic feet (15,931 m^{3}) (grain); 499,573 cubic feet (14,146 m^{3}) (bale)
- Complement: 38–62 USMM; 21–40 USNAG
- Armament: Varied by ship; Bow-mounted 3-inch (76 mm)/50-caliber gun; Stern-mounted 4-inch (102 mm)/50-caliber gun; 2–8 × single 20-millimeter (0.79 in) Oerlikon anti-aircraft (AA) cannons and/or, 2–8 × 37-millimeter (1.46 in) M1 AA guns

SS Patrick B. Whalen was a Liberty ship built in the United States during World War II. She was named after Patrick B. Whalen, who was lost at sea while he was the 1st assistant engineer on SS Illinois, after she was torpedoed by German submarine U-159, on 2 June 1942, in the Caribbean.

== Construction ==
Patrick B. Whalen was laid down on 29 January 1945, under a Maritime Commission (MARCOM) contract, MC hull 2404, by J.A. Jones Construction, Brunswick, Georgia; she was sponsored by Mrs. Leo W. Regan, and launched on 15 March 1945.

== History ==
She was allocated to the Isbrandtsen Steamship Co. Inc., on 30 March 1945. On 19 July 1949, she was sold to Atl. Marine Transport Co., for commercial use and renamed Christiam and later Bostonian and Manhattan. In April 1952, she was sold to National Transocean Carriers, Inc. In November 1952, she was sold to Phoenix Steamship Corp., and renamed Seadragon. In July 1953, she was sold to Navigator Steamship Corp., and renamed Charles C. Dunaif. In July 1958, she was sold to Cargo Ships & Tankers, Inc. In June 1961, she was sold to a Liberian shipping company and renamed Wilderness. On 4 May 1962, she was reflagged for the US. In March 1967, she was sold to Debbie Mae Shipping Corp., and renamed Debbie Mae. She was sold for scrapping in Taiwan in May 1967.

== Bibliography ==
- "Jones Construction, Brunswick GA". www.ShipbuildingHistory.com. 13 October 2010.
- "Liberty Ships – World War II".
- Maritime Administration. "Patrick B. Whalen". Ship History Database Vessel Status Card. U.S. Department of Transportation, Maritime Administration. Archived from the original on 12 December 2019.
- Davies, James (May 2004). "Specifications (As-Built)" (PDF). p. 23.
- "SS Patrick B. Whalen".
