= Diego Columbus =

Spanish explorer and son of Christopher Columbus (1479/80–1526)

Admiral of the Ocean Sea Viceroy of the Indies Diego Columbus
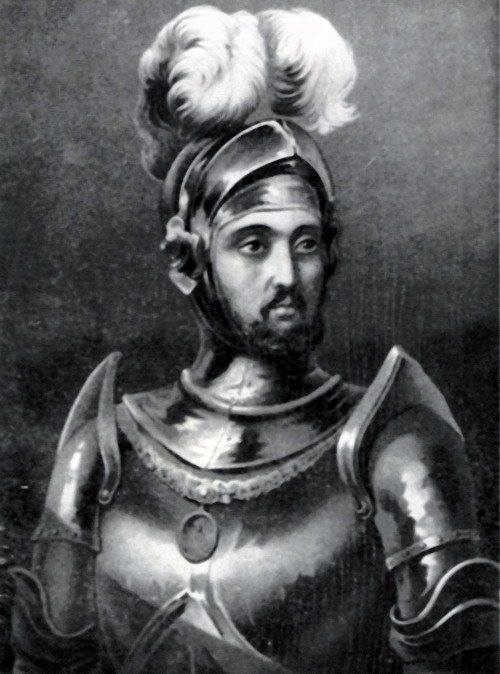
- Portrait of Diego Columbus

2nd Viceroy of the Indies
- In office May 6, 1509 – February 23, 1526
- Monarchs: Joanna of Castile co-monarch: Charles I of Spain (1516–1526)
- Preceded by: Christopher Columbus (1506)
- Succeeded by: Antonio de Mendoza (in 1535 as Viceroy of New Spain)

2nd Admiral of the Ocean Sea
- In office May 20, 1509 – February 23, 1526
- Monarchs: Joanna of Castile co-monarchs Philip I of Castile (1506), Charles I of Spain (1516–1526)
- Preceded by: Christopher Columbus
- Succeeded by: Luis Colón de Toledo

4th Governor of the Indies
- In office July 10, 1509 – late February, 1515
- Appointed by: Ferdinand II of Aragon (as regent to Joanna of Castile)
- Preceded by: Nicolás de Ovando y Cáceres
- Succeeded by: Cristóbal Lebrón

8th Governor of the Indies
- In office November 14, 1520 – September 16, 1523
- Appointed by: Charles I of Spain (as co-ruler of his mother Joanna)
- Preceded by: Rodrigo de Figueroa
- Succeeded by: Gaspar de Espinosa

Personal details
- Born: 1479/1480 Porto Santo, Portugal
- Died: February 23, 1526 (aged 45) La Puebla de Montalbán, Spain
- Spouse: María de Toledo y Rojas
- Children: 5, including Luis
- Parent(s): Christopher Columbus; Filipa Moniz Perestrelo
- Occupation: Navigator; Explorer

Diego Columbus (Note: Spanish: Diego Colón; Portuguese: Diogo Colombo; Italian: Diego Colombo;) (1479/1480 – February 23, 1526) was a navigator and explorer under the kings of Castile and Aragón. He served as the 2nd admiral of the Indies, 2nd viceroy of the Indies and 4th governor of the Indies as a vassal to the kings of Castile and Aragón. He was the only child of Christopher Columbus by his wife Filipa Moniz Perestrelo.

He was born in Porto Santo, Portugal in 1479 or 1480. He spent most of his adult life trying to regain the titles and privileges granted to his father for his explorations and then denied in 1500. He was greatly aided in this goal by his marriage to María de Toledo y Rojas, niece of the 2nd Duke of Alba, who was the cousin of King Ferdinand.

== Early life ==
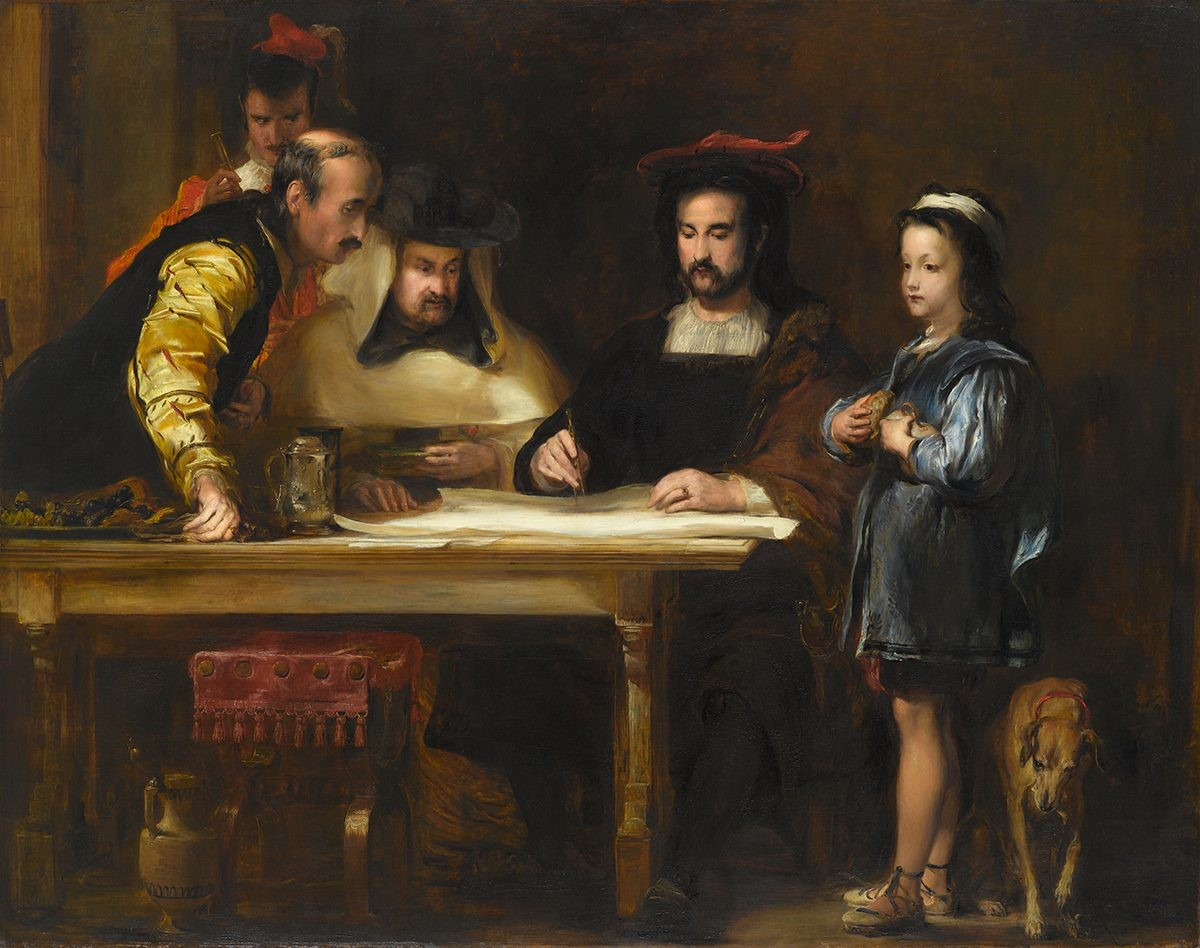
Christopher Columbus Explaining His Intended Voyage by David Wilkie. Diego stands on the right.

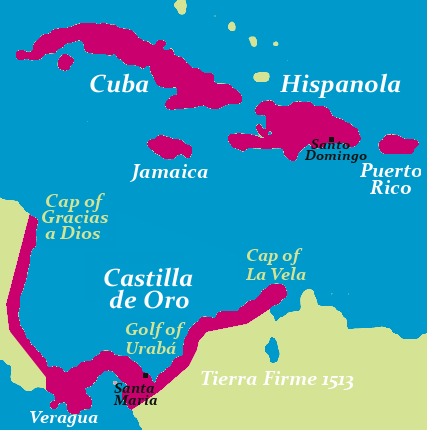
Tierra Firme (1513) - Castilla de Oro

Diego was made a page at the Spanish court in 1492, the year his father embarked on his first voyage. Diego had a younger half-brother, Fernando, by Beatriz Enríquez de Arana.

Diego Columbus was taught by Christopher Columbus's mistress, Beatriz De Arana, until he transferred to the Franciscan monastery of La Rabida, at the urging of Father Juan Perez and friar Horacio Crassocius, prominent Franciscans and occasional priests to his father.

Ferdinand and Diego had been pages to Prince Don Juan, then became pages to Queen Isabella in 1497.

== Viceroy of the Indies ==
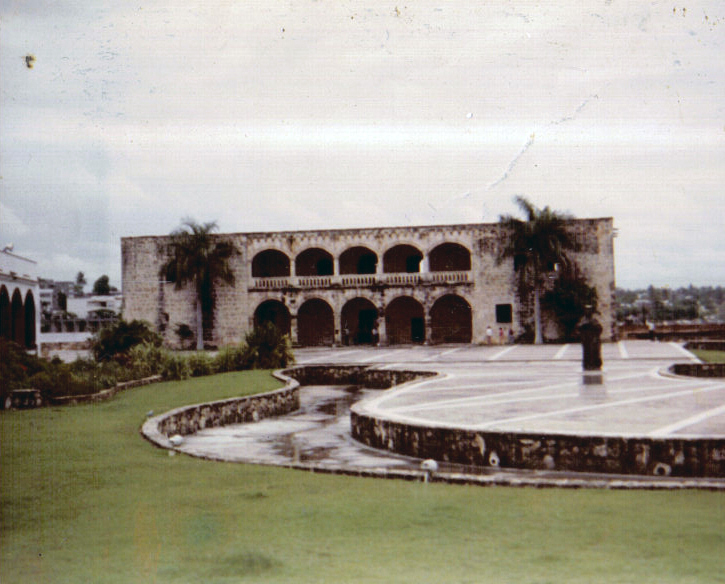
His residence the Alcázar de Colón

In August 1508, he was named Governor of the Indies, the post his father had held, arriving in Santo Domingo in July 1509. He established his home (the Alcázar de Colón), which still stands in Santo Domingo, in what is now the Dominican Republic. In 1511 as Viceroy of the Indies, Diego Columbus commissioned Diego Velázquez de Cuéllar to go on an expedition from Santo Domingo to the newly acquired Spanish island of Cuba.

According to Floyd, Diego "... was accompanied by a splendid entourage: his wife, Doña Maria, the first gran dama of the New World, the Duke of Alba's niece, with her own suite of doncellas; and his immediate relatives – Fernando his half-brother, his two uncles, Diego and Bartolomé, and his cousins, Andrea and Giovanni. Also on the expedition were his criados and his father's old retainers: Marcos de Aguilar, his forthright alcalde mayor, Diego Mendez, his business manager, and Gerónimo de Agüero, his former tutor. Other loyal Colombistas met him at Santo Domingo – his uncle by marriage, Francisco de Garay, whom he named alguacil mayor, and Bartolomé's criados, Miguel Díaz, Diego Velázquez, and Juan Cerón. His coming represented the permanent establishment of the most titled and notable family in the islands, at least for many years."

In 1511, a royal council declared Hispaniola, Puerto Rico, Jamaica and Cuba under Diego's power "by right of his father." However, Uraba and Veragua were deemed excluded, since the council regarded them as being discovered by Rodrigo de Bastidas. The council further confirmed Diego's titles of viceroy and admiral were hereditary, though honorific. Furthermore, Diego had the right to one-tenth of the net royal income. However, factions soon formed between those loyal to Diego and Ferdinand's royal officials. Matters deteriorated to the point that Ferdinand recalled Diego in 1514. Diego then spent the next five years in Spain "futilely pressing his claims." Finally, in 1520, Diego's powers were restored by Charles.

Diego returned to Santo Domingo on 12 November 1520 in the midst of a native revolt against Spanish rule in the area of the Franciscan missions on the Cumana River, which was the site of Spanish slave raids, alongside the salt and pearl trades. Diego sent Gonzalo de Ocampo on a punitive expedition with 200 men and 6 ships. Then in 1521, Diego invested in Bartolomé de las Casas's enterprise to settle the Cumana area. That failure, blamed on Diego, meant the loss of the king's confidence. That loss, plus Diego's defiance of royal power on Cuba, forced Charles to reprimand Diego in 1523 and recall him back to Spain.

The first major slave rebellion in the Americas occurred in Santo Domingo on 26 December 1522, when enslaved Jolof laborers working on Diego's sugar plantation started a revolt. During the rebellion, many formerly enslaved insurgents managed to escape into the mountainous interior of the colony, where they established independent maroon communities amongst the surviving Taíno. However, many of the rebels were captured, and the admiral had them hanged.

== Death and legacy ==
After his death, a compromise was reached in 1536 in which his son, Luis Colón de Toledo, was named Admiral of the Indies and renounced all other rights for a perpetual annuity of 10,000 ducats, the island of Jamaica as a fief, an estate of 25 square leagues on the Isthmus of Panama, then called Veragua, and the titles of Duke of Veragua and Marquess of Jamaica.

After Columbus's death on February 23, 1526, in Spain, the rents, offices and titles in the New World went into dispute by his descendants.

== Marriage and children ==
He initially planned to marry Mencia de Guzman, daughter of the Duke of Medina Sidonia, but he was forced by King Fernando to marry the king's cousin María de Toledo y Rojas (c. 1490 – May 11, 1549), who secured the transportation and burial of her father-in-law, Christopher Columbus, in Santo Domingo. She was the daughter of Fernando Alvarez de Toledo, 1st Lord of Villoria, son of García Álvarez de Toledo, 1st Duke of Alba, and his first wife María de Rojas, and had the following children:

- María Colón de Toledo (c. 1510 – ?), married to Sancho Folch de Cardona, 1st Marquess of Guadalest
- Luis Colón, 1st Duke of Veragua (c. 1519/1520/1522 – 1572), married firstly in 1546 to María de Mosquera y Pasamonte, daughter of Juan de Mosquera and his wife Ofrasina de Pasamonte, and had:
  - María Colón de Toledo y Mosquera, a nun in Valladolid
  - Felipa Colón de Toledo, 2nd Duchess of Veragua. He married secondly in Valladolid, on 19 October 1555, to Ana de Castro Osorio, daughter of Beatriz de Castro Osório, 6th Countess of Lemos and Sárria, and her second husband Alvaro Osorio, without issue.
- Cristóbal Colón de Toledo (c. 1510 – 1571), married firstly to María Leonor Lerma de Zuazo, without issue; married secondly to Ana de Pravia, and had one son (Diego Colon y Pravia [c. 1551 – Jan 27, 1578]) and one daughter (Francisca Colon y Pravia, [c. 1552 - April 1616]; and married thirdly to María Magadalena de Guzmán y Anaya, and had:
  - Diego Colón de Toledo, father of Diego the 4th Admiral of the Indies.
  - Francisca Colón de Toledo y Pravia (c. 1550 – April, 1616), married Diego de Ortegón (c. 1550 –), and had four children: Guiomar de Ortegon y Colon [d. 1621]; Jacoba de Oretgon y Colon [d. 1618]; Ana de Ortegon y Colon; and Josefa de Ortegon y Colon
  - María Colón de Toledo y Guzmán (c. 1550 – ?), married to Luis de Avila, and had:
    - Cristóbal de Avila y Colón (1579–?), unmarried and without issue
    - Luis de Avila y Colón (1582–1633), married Maria de Rojas-Guzman Grajeda, without issue; married secondly to Francisca de Sandoval and had one son Cristobal
    - Bernardino Dávila y Colón (d. 1633)
    - Maria de Avila y Colón (1592–?), married Alonso de Guzman Grajeda and had one daughter (Mayor de Grajeda y Avila [c.1611-])
    - Magdalena Dávila Colón (1592–1621)
    - María Dávila Colón (1596–?)
- Juana Colón de Toledo (died c. 1592), married her cousin Luis de La Cueva y Toledo; their only child was María Colón de la Cueva (c. 1548 – c. 1600) who claimed the duchy of Veragua and died in New Spain (México).
- Isabel Colón de Toledo (c. 1515 – ?), married Don Jorge Alberto de Portugal y Melo (1470–?), 1st Count of Gelves (who married secondly; his first marriage to Dona Guiomar de Ataíde remained childless), son of Don Álvaro de Bragança, Lord of Tentúgal, Póvoa, Buarcos and Cadaval and Chancellor-Major of the Realm of Portugal. Their grandson, D. Nuno Álvares Pereira Colón y Portugal, Duke of Veragua and Admiral of the Indies, became regent of the Kingdom of Portugal from 1621 until his death.

== See also ==
- List of Viceroys of New Spain
- Viceroyalty of New Spain

== Notes ==
Government offices
Preceded by Nicolás de Ovando	Governor of the Indies; 1509–1511	Extinct
Military offices
Preceded by Christopher Columbus	Admiral of the Indies; 1508–1526	Succeeded by Luis Colón de Toledo
Regnal titles
In abeyance Title last held by Christopher Columbus	Viceroy of the Indies; 1511–1526	Extinct
Spanish nobility
New title	Duke of Veragua; 1509–1526	Succeeded by Luis Colón de Toledo
New title	Marquis of Jamaica; 1509–1526	Succeeded by Luis Colón de Toledo
