= SS Ponce De Leon =

Liberty ship of WWII

History

United States
- Name: Ponce De Leon
- Namesake: Ponce De Leon
- Owner: War Shipping Administration (WSA)
- Operator: Waterman Steamship Corp.
- Ordered: as type (EC2-S-C1) hull, MC hull 1193
- Builder: St. Johns River Shipbuilding Company, Jacksonville, Florida
- Cost: $2,680,640
- Yard number: 1
- Way number: 1
- Laid down: 15 August 1942
- Launched: 14 March 1943
- Sponsored by: Mrs. J.C. Merrill
- Completed: 30 April 1943
- Identification: Call sign: KHQF
- Fate: Laid up in the, National Defense Reserve Fleet, Mobile, Alabama, 11 April 1947; Sold for scrapping, 10 September 1962, removed from fleet, 9 October 1962

General characteristics
- Class & type: Liberty ship; type EC2-S-C1, standard
- Tonnage: 10,865 LT DWT; 7,176 GRT
- Displacement: 3,380 long tons (3,434 t) (light); 14,245 long tons (14,474 t) (max)
- Length: 441 feet 6 inches (135 m) oa; 416 feet (127 m) pp; 427 feet (130 m) lwl
- Beam: 57 feet (17 m)
- Draft: 27 ft 9.25 in (8.4646 m)
- Installed power: 2 × Oil fired 450 °F (232 °C) boilers, operating at 220 psi (1,500 kPa); 2,500 hp (1,900 kW)
- Propulsion: 1 × triple-expansion steam engine, (manufactured by General Machinery Corp., Hamilton, Ohio); 1 × screw propeller
- Speed: 11.5 knots (21.3 km/h; 13.2 mph)
- Capacity: 562,608 cubic feet (15,931 m^{3}) (grain); 499,573 cubic feet (14,146 m^{3}) (bale)
- Complement: 38–62 USMM; 21–40 USNAG
- Armament: Varied by ship; Bow-mounted 3-inch (76 mm)/50-caliber gun; Stern-mounted 4-inch (102 mm)/50-caliber gun; 2–8 × single 20-millimeter (0.79 in) Oerlikon anti-aircraft (AA) cannons and/or, 2–8 × 37-millimeter (1.46 in) M1 AA guns

SS Ponce De Leon was a Liberty ship built in the United States during World War II. She was named after Ponce De Leon, a Spanish explorer and conquistador known for leading the first official European expedition to Florida and the first governor of Puerto Rico.

== Construction ==
Ponce De Leon was laid down on 15 August 1942, under a Maritime Commission (MARCOM) contract, MC hull 1193, by the St. Johns River Shipbuilding Company, Jacksonville, Florida; she was sponsored by Mrs. J.C. Merrill, the wife of the president of the St. John's River SB Corp., she was launched on 14 March 1943.

== History ==
She was allocated to Waterman Steamship Corp., on 30 April 1943. On 11 April 1947, she was laid up in the, National Defense Reserve Fleet, Mobile, Alabama. She was sold for scrapping, on 10 September 1962, to Gulf Shipyard Industrial Park Co., for $49,799. She was removed from the fleet on 9 October 1962.

== Bibliography ==
- "St. John's River Shipbuilding, Jacksonville FL". www.ShipbuildingHistory.com. 16 October 2010.
- Maritime Administration. "Ponce De Leon". Ship History Database Vessel Status Card. U.S. Department of Transportation, Maritime Administration.
- Davies, James (May 2004). "Specifications (As-Built)" (PDF). p. 23.
- "SS Ponce De Leon".
