= SS Peter Minuit =

Liberty ship of WWII

History

United States
- Name: Peter Minuit
- Namesake: Peter Minuit
- Owner: War Shipping Administration (WSA)
- Operator: Grace Line, Inc.
- Ordered: as type (EC2-S-C1) hull, MCE hull 35
- Awarded: 14 March 1941
- Builder: Bethlehem-Fairfield Shipyard, Baltimore, Maryland
- Cost: $1,103,958
- Yard number: 2022
- Way number: 1
- Laid down: 28 January 1942
- Launched: 23 April 1942
- Completed: 27 May 1942
- Identification: Call sign: KFNJ
- Fate: Laid up in the National Defense Reserve Fleet, Beaumont, Texas, 14 June 1948; Sold for scrapping, 11 March 1963, withdrawn from fleet, 19 April 1963

General characteristics
- Class & type: Liberty ship; type EC2-S-C1, standard
- Tonnage: 10,865 LT DWT; 7,176 GRT
- Displacement: 3,380 long tons (3,434 t) (light); 14,245 long tons (14,474 t) (max)
- Length: 441 feet 6 inches (135 m) oa; 416 feet (127 m) pp; 427 feet (130 m) lwl
- Beam: 57 feet (17 m)
- Draft: 27 ft 9.25 in (8.4646 m)
- Installed power: 2 × Oil fired 450 °F (232 °C) boilers, operating at 220 psi (1,500 kPa); 2,500 hp (1,900 kW)
- Propulsion: 1 × triple-expansion steam engine, (manufactured by Toledo Shipbuilding Co., Toledo, Ohio); 1 × screw propeller
- Speed: 11.5 knots (21.3 km/h; 13.2 mph)
- Capacity: 562,608 cubic feet (15,931 m^{3}) (grain); 499,573 cubic feet (14,146 m^{3}) (bale)
- Complement: 38–62 USMM; 21–40 USNAG
- Armament: Varied by ship; Bow-mounted 3-inch (76 mm)/50-caliber gun; Stern-mounted 4-inch (102 mm)/50-caliber gun; 2–8 × single 20-millimeter (0.79 in) Oerlikon anti-aircraft (AA) cannons and/or, 2–8 × 37-millimeter (1.46 in) M1 AA guns

SS Peter Minuit was a Liberty ship built in the United States during World War II. She was named after Peter Minuit, a Walloon from Tournai, in present-day Belgium. He was the 3rd Director of the Dutch North American colony of New Netherland from 1626 until 1631, and 3rd Governor of New Netherland. He founded the Swedish colony of New Sweden on the Delaware Peninsula in 1638. Minuit is generally credited with orchestrating the purchase of Manhattan Island for the Dutch from the Lenape Native Americans. Manhattan later became the site of the Dutch city of New Amsterdam, and the borough of Manhattan of modern-day New York City.

== Construction ==
Peter Minuit was laid down on 28 January 1942, under a Maritime Commission (MARCOM) contract, MCE hull 35, by the Bethlehem-Fairfield Shipyard, Baltimore, Maryland; and was launched on 23 April 1942.

== History ==
She was allocated to Grace Line, Inc., on 27 May 1942. On 14 June 1948, she was laid up in the National Defense Reserve Fleet, Beaumont, Texas. On 11 March 1963, she was sold for scrapping to Southern Scrap Material Co., Ltd., for $46,359.79. She was withdrawn from the fleet on 19 April 1963.

== Bibliography ==
- "Bethlehem-Fairfield, Baltimore MD". www.ShipbuildingHistory.com. 14 August 2008.
- Maritime Administration. "Peter Minuit". Ship History Database Vessel Status Card. U.S. Department of Transportation, Maritime Administration.
- Davies, James (May 2004). "Specifications (As-Built)" (PDF). p. 23.
- "SS Peter Minuit".
