= SS Patrick H. Morrissey =

World War II Liberty ship of the United States

History

United States
- Name: Patrick H. Morrissey
- Namesake: Patrick H. Morrissey
- Ordered: as type (EC2-S-C1) hull, MC hull 1507
- Builder: J.A. Jones Construction, Brunswick, Georgia
- Cost: $1,474,585
- Yard number: 123
- Way number: 1
- Laid down: 23 October 1943
- Launched: 9 December 1943
- Sponsored by: Katherine M. Geraghty
- Completed: 17 December 1943
- Fate: Transferred to the British Ministry of War Transport upon completion.

United Kingdom
- Name: Samdee
- Acquired: 17 December 1943
- Fate: Sold, 18 April 1947

United Kingdom
- Name: Samdee
- Operator: Tho. & Jno. Brocklebank, Ltd.
- Acquired: 18 April 1947
- Fate: Scrapped, 1967

General characteristics
- Class & type: Liberty ship; type EC2-S-C1, standard
- Tonnage: 10,865 LT DWT; 7,176 GRT
- Displacement: 3,380 long tons (3,434 t) (light); 14,245 long tons (14,474 t) (max)
- Length: 441 feet 6 inches (135 m) oa; 416 feet (127 m) pp; 427 feet (130 m) lwl
- Beam: 57 feet (17 m)
- Draft: 27 ft 9.25 in (8.4646 m)
- Installed power: 2 × Oil fired 450 °F (232 °C) boilers, operating at 220 psi (1,500 kPa); 2,500 hp (1,900 kW)
- Propulsion: 1 × triple-expansion steam engine, (manufactured by Filer and Stowell, Milwaukee, Wisconsin); 1 × screw propeller
- Speed: 11.5 knots (21.3 km/h; 13.2 mph)
- Capacity: 562,608 cubic feet (15,931 m^{3}) (grain); 499,573 cubic feet (14,146 m^{3}) (bale)
- Complement: 38–62 USMM; 21–40 USNAG
- Armament: Varied by ship; Bow-mounted 3-inch (76 mm)/50-caliber gun; Stern-mounted 4-inch (102 mm)/50-caliber gun; 2–8 × single 20-millimeter (0.79 in) Oerlikon anti-aircraft (AA) cannons and/or, 2–8 × 37-millimeter (1.46 in) M1 AA guns

SS Patrick H. Morrissey was a Liberty ship built in the United States during World War II. She was originally named after Patrick H. Morrissey, a former head of the Brotherhood of Railway Trainmen. She was transferred to the British Ministry of War Transportation (MoWT) and renamed Samdee upon completion.

== Construction ==
Patrick H. Morrissey was laid down on 23 October 1943, under a Maritime Commission (MARCOM) contract, MC hull 1507, by J.A. Jones Construction, Brunswick, Georgia; she was sponsored by Katherine M. Geraghty, daughter of Patrick H. Morrissey, and launched on 9 December 1943.

== History ==
She was allocated to Thos. & Jno. Brocklebank, Ltd., on 17 December 1943. On or about 18 April 1947, she was sold to Thos. & Jno. Brocklebank, Ltd. Samdee was scrapped in 1967.

== Bibliography ==
- "Jones Construction, Brunswick GA". www.ShipbuildingHistory.com. 13 October 2010.
- "Liberty Ships – World War II".
- Maritime Administration. "Patrick H. Morrissey". Ship History Database Vessel Status Card. U.S. Department of Transportation, Maritime Administration. Archived from the original on 12 December 2019.
- Davies, James (May 2004). "Specifications (As-Built)" (PDF). p. 23.
- "Liberty Ship Named for Morrissey". The Pantagraph. Bloomington, Illinois. 8 December 1943.
- "SS Patrick H. Morrissey".
