= Catherine Armstrong =

British historian

Catherine Mary Armstrong (born 1978) is a British historian. She is a professor of modern history at Loughborough University, where she has worked since 2007. Much of her research concerns American history, including questions around identity, landscape, and slavery.

== Career ==
Armstrong read for a bachelor's in history at the University of Warwick from 1995 to 1998 and an master's in Religious and Social History 1500–1700 from Warwick in 2000. She remained at Warwick for her doctorate, which was supervised by Bernard Capp. Her thesis, Representations of North American 'place' and 'potential' in English travel literature, 1607–1660, was submitted in 2004. She taught at Warwick during and shortly after her PhD, as well as briefly at Oxford Brookes University. During this time, she co-edited two collections with John Hinks as part of the British Library and Oak Knoll Press Print Networks series: Printing Places in 2005 and Worlds of Print in 2006.

Armstrong took up a lectureship in American history at Manchester Metropolitan University in 2007. The same year, she published her first monograph, Writing North America in the Seventeenth Century, with Ashgate Publishing. In 2011, she was promoted to senior lecturer, and in 2013, she became a fellow of the Royal Historical Society. Armstrong published two books in 2013: the monograph Landscape and Identity in North America’s Southern Colonies 1660–1745 with Ashgate and the textbook The Atlantic Experience with Bloomsbury Academic, which she coauthored with Laura M. Chmielewski.

Armstrong began a lectureship in modern history at Loughborough University in 2014. She published a scholarly edition of a previously unpublished anonymous commonplace book held in the British Library dating to the seventeenth century with The Edwin Mellen Press and an edited collection, Text and Image in the City, with Cambridge Scholars, which she co-edited with Hinks. She went on to publish a methods book, Using Non-textual Sources: An Historian's Guide, with Bloomsbury. She was promoted to senior lecturer at Loughborough in 2018, and co-edited, with Hinks, The English Urban Renaissance Revisited, which was published by Cambridge Scholars. In 2019, she published a collection called The Many Faces of Slavery with Bloomsbury Academic, which she co-edited with Lawrence Aje. In 2020, she was promoted to reader, and published the monograph American Slavery, American Imperialism with Cambridge University Press. She completed a Masters in Business Administration at Loughborough in 2024, and was promoted to Professor in 2025.

== Selected bibliography ==
- John Hinks and Catherine Armstong, eds. (2005). Printing Places: Locations of Book Production & Distribution Since 1500. Oak Knoll Press and the British Museum.
- John Hinks and Catherine Armstong, eds. (2006). Worlds of Print: Diversity in the Book Trade. Oak Knoll Press and the British Museum.
- Catherine Amrstrong (2007). Writing North America in the Seventeenth Century: English Representations in Print and Manuscript. Ashgate.
- Catherine Armstrong, ed. (2013). Historical Insights: Teaching North American History Using Images and Material Culture. The Higher Education Academy.
- Catherine Armstrong and Laura M. Chmielewski (2013). The Atlantic Experience: Peoples, Places, Ideas. Bloomsbury Academic.
- Catherine Armstrong (2013). Landscape and Identity in North America's Southern Colonies from 1660 to 1745. Ashgate.
- Catherine Armstrong, ed. (2014). A Scholarly Edition of a Seventeenth-Century Anonymous Commonplace Book in the British Library: How People Received and Responded to the Books They Read. The Edwin Mellen Press.
- Catherine Armstrong (2015). Using Non-textual Sources: An Historian's Guide. Bloomsbury Academic.
- John Hinks and Catherine Armstrong, eds. (2017). Text and Image in the City: Manuscript, Print and Visual Culture in Urban Space. Cambridge Scholars.
- John Hinks and Catherine Armstrong, eds. (2018). The English Urban Renaissance Revisited. Cambridge Scholars.
- Lawrence Aje and Catherine Armstrong, eds. (2019). The Many Faces of Slavery: New Perspectives on Slave Ownership and Experiences in the Americas. Bloomsbury Academic.
- Catherine Armstrong (2020). American Slavery, American Imperialism: US Perceptions of Global Servitude, 1870–1914. Cambridge University Press.
