= SS Pearl Harbor =

Liberty ship of WWII

History

United States
- Name: Pearl Harbor
- Namesake: Pearl Harbor
- Owner: War Shipping Administration (WSA)
- Operator: Agwilines Inc.
- Ordered: as type (EC2-S-C1) hull, MCE hull 927
- Awarded: 30 January 1942
- Builder: Bethlehem-Fairfield Shipyard, Baltimore, Maryland
- Cost: $1,071,114
- Yard number: 2077
- Way number: 15
- Laid down: 10 November 1942
- Launched: 7 December 1942
- Sponsored by: Mrs. Inez G. Kidd
- Completed: 21 December 1942
- Identification: Call sign: KKGL
- Fate: Laid up in Reserve Fleet, 21 April 1948, sold for scrap 29 October 1962

General characteristics
- Class & type: Liberty ship; type EC2-S-C1, standard
- Tonnage: 10,865 LT DWT; 7,176 GRT
- Displacement: 3,380 long tons (3,434 t) (light); 14,245 long tons (14,474 t) (max)
- Length: 441 feet 6 inches (135 m) oa; 416 feet (127 m) pp; 427 feet (130 m) lwl
- Beam: 57 feet (17 m)
- Draft: 27 ft 9.25 in (8.4646 m)
- Installed power: 2 × Oil fired 450 °F (232 °C) boilers, operating at 220 psi (1,500 kPa); 2,500 hp (1,900 kW)
- Propulsion: 1 × triple-expansion steam engine, (manufactured by Worthington Pump & Machinery Corp, Harrison, New Jersey); 1 × screw propeller
- Speed: 11.5 knots (21.3 km/h; 13.2 mph)
- Capacity: 562,608 cubic feet (15,931 m^{3}) (grain); 499,573 cubic feet (14,146 m^{3}) (bale)
- Complement: 38–62 USMM; 21–40 USNAG
- Armament: Varied by ship; Bow-mounted 3-inch (76 mm)/50-caliber gun; Stern-mounted 4-inch (102 mm)/50-caliber gun; 2–8 × single 20-millimeter (0.79 in) Oerlikon anti-aircraft (AA) cannons and/or, 2–8 × 37-millimeter (1.46 in) M1 AA guns

SS Pearl Harbor was a Liberty ship built in the United States during World War II. She was named after Pearl Harbor, an American lagoon harbor on the island of Oahu, Hawaii, where the surprise attack by the Imperial Japanese Navy on 7 December 1941, led the United States to declare war on the Empire of Japan.

== Construction ==
Pearl Harbor was laid down on 10 November 1942, under a Maritime Commission (MARCOM) contract, MCE hull 927, by the Bethlehem-Fairfield Shipyard, Baltimore, Maryland; she was sponsored by Mrs. Inez G. Kidd, widow of Rear Admiral Isaac Kidd, and was launched on 7 December 1942.

== History ==
She was allocated to Agwilines Inc., on 8 December 1942.

On 5 April 1948, she was laid up in the Beaumont Reserve Fleet, in Beaumont, Texas. On 29 October 1962, she was sold to the Southern Scrap Material Co., for $46,488.88, to be scrapped.

== Bibliography ==
- "Bethlehem-Fairfield, Baltimore MD". www.ShipbuildingHistory.com. 7 August 2021.
- Maritime Administration. "Pearl Harbor". Ship History Database Vessel Status Card. U.S. Department of Transportation, Maritime Administration.
- Davies, James (May 2004). "Specifications (As-Built)" (PDF). p. 23.
- "SS Pearl Harbor".
