= Barrasa =

Barrasa is a Spanish surname. Notable people with the surname include:

- Alfonso Barrasa, Bishop of Salamanca from 1361 to 1382, and a trusted man of King Henry II of Castile
- Jacinto Barrasa (died 1704), Peruvian Jesuit preacher and historian
- José de Barrasa y Fernández de Castro (1847–1929) was a sailor, politician, and senator of the Kingdom of Spain

== See also ==
- Barraza (surname)
