= Maroto =

Maroto is a surname often linked to Spanish origin. Notable people with the surname include:

- Cristóbal Colón de Carvajal y Maroto, 17th Duke of Veragua (born 1925), Spanish nobleman and Navy officer
- Esteban Maroto (born 1942), Spanish comic book artist
- Fray Diego Maroto (1618–1696), Peruvian architect
- Javier Maroto (born 1972), Spanish politician
- Luis Maroto (born 1964), Spanish business executive
- Mariano González Maroto (born 1984), Spanish footballer
- Rafael Maroto, 1st Count of Casa Maroto (1783–1853), Spanish nobleman and general
- Raúl Maroto (born 1965), Spanish fencer
- Reyes Maroto (born 1973), Spanish economist and politician
- Sol Sánchez Maroto (born 1970), Spanish politician

== See also ==
- House of Maroto, Spanish aristocratic family
