= List of colonial governors of Spanish Guinea =

Governor of Spanish Guinea
- Gobernador del Guinea Español
- Coat of arms of Spanish Guinea
- Longest serving Ángel Barrera y Luyando; 10 September 1910 – 8 February 1924
- Reports to: Head of State of Spain
- Seat: Santa Isabel
- Formation: 24 October 1778; 247 years ago
- First holder: Felipe de los Santos Toro y Freyre, conde de Argelejo
- Final holder: Víctor Suances y Díaz del Río
- Abolished: 12 October 1968; 57 years ago
- Succession: President of Equatorial Guinea

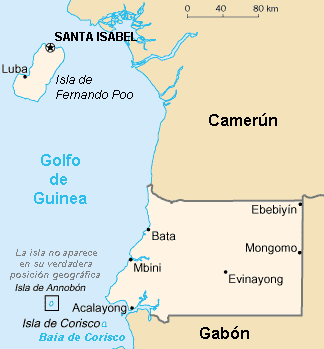
Map of Spanish Guinea.

The colonial governors of Spanish Guinea were the colonial administrators responsible for the territory of Spanish Guinea, an area equivalent to modern-day Equatorial Guinea.

== List ==
(Dates in italics indicate de facto continuation of office)

Tenure	Portrait	Incumbent	Notes
Spanish suzerainty
24 October 1778 to 14 November 1778		Felipe de los Santos Toro y Freyre, conde de Argelejo, Governor	
14 November 1778 to 30 December 1781		Joaquín Primo de Rivera y Pérez de Acal, Governor	
30 December 1781 to 27 October 1827	Vacant		
British suzerainty
Superintendents later Governors of Fernando Pó (1849–1855 also British Consuls of the Bight of Biafra, Nigeria)
27 October 1827 to 4 April 1829		William Fitzwilliam Owen, Superintendent	
4 April 1829 to 1830		Edward Nicolls, Superintendent	1st time
1830 to 1831		John Beecroft, acting Superintendent	1st time
18 August 1831 to 1833		Edward Nicolls, Superintendent	2nd time
1833 to 10 June 1854		John Beecroft, Superintendent	2nd time
10 June 1854 to 27 May 1858		James W. B. Lynslager, acting Superintendent	
Spanish suzerainty
27 May 1858 to 1 September 1859		Carlos de Chacón y Michelena, Governor	
1 September 1859 to 30 June 1862		José de la Gándara y Navarro, Governor	
30 June 1862 to 1 August 1865		Pantaleón López de la Torre Ayllón, Governor	
1 August 1865 to 31 August 1865		Francisco Osorio, acting Governor	
31 August 1865 to 18 September 1865		Félix Recio, acting Governor	1st time
18 September 1865 to 1 April 1868		José Gómez de Barreda y Ruiz de Mazmela, Governor	
1 April 1868 to 9 August 1868		Félix Recio, acting Governor	2nd time
9 August 1868 to 18 July 1869		Joaquín de Souza y Gallardo, Governor	
21 August 1869 to 11 September 1869		Clemente Ramos, acting Governor	
11 September 1869 to 21 January 1870		Manuel Vial, acting Governor	1st time
21 January 1870 to 11 June 1870		Zoilo Sánchez Ocaña, Governor	
11 June 1870 to 16 August 1870		Manuel Vial, acting Governor	2nd time
16 August 1870 to 14 February 1871		Felipe C. Argüelles, acting Governor	1st time
14 February 1871 to 28 April 1871		Federico Anrich Santamaría, Governor	
28 April 1871 to 1 October 1871		Felipe C. Argüelles, acting Governor	2nd time
1 October 1871 to 23 June 1872		Antonio Vivar, acting Governor	
23 June 1872 to 5 December 1872		Pedro Osa, acting Governor	
5 December 1872 to 22 November 1874		Ignacio García Tudela, Governor	
22 November 1874 to 22 January 1875		Jacobo Varela, acting Governor	
22 January 1875 to 13 February 1877		Diego Santisteban y Chamorro, Governor	
13 February 1877 to 1 February 1879		Alejandro Arias Salgado, Governor	
1 February 1879 to 21 April 1879		Luis de la Pila, acting Governor	
21 April 1879 to 20 June 1879		Juan Aguilar, acting Governor	
20 June 1879 to 24 July 1879		José Montes de Oca y Aceñero, acting Governor	1st time
24 July 1879 to 3 September 1880		Enrique Santaló y Sáenz de Tejada, Governor	
3 September 1880 to 24 January 1883		José Montes de Oca y Aceñero, Governor	2nd time
24 January 1883 to 25 January 1883		Francisco Romera, acting Governor	
25 January 1883 to 28 December 1884		Antonio Cano y Prieto, Governor	
28 December 1884 to 28 January 1885		Waldo Pérez Cossio, acting Governor	
28 January 1885 to 1 October 1887		José Montes de Oca y Aceñero, Governor	3rd time
1 October 1887 to 8 November 1887		Juan de la Rocha, acting Governor	
8 November 1887 to 4 February 1888		Luis Navarro, Governor	
4 February 1888 to 20 April 1888		José María Ibarra y Autrán, acting Governor	1st time
20 April 1888 to 21 April 1890		Antonio Morena Guerra, Governor	
21 April 1890 to 4 November 1890		José María Ibarra y Autrán, Governor	2nd time
4 November 1890 to 22 December 1890		José Gómez de Barreda, Governor	
22 December 1890 to 24 December 1891		José de Barrasa y Fernández de Castro, Governor	
24 December 1891 to 10 April 1892		Antonio Martínez, Governor	
10 April 1892 to 12 May 1893		Eulogio Merchán y Rico, Governor	
12 May 1893 to 17 May 1893		Dionisio Shelly, acting Governor	1st time
17 May 1893 to 1 June 1893		Pio Porcell, acting Governor	
1 June 1893 to 29 July 1893		Dionisio Shelly, acting Governor	2nd time
29 July 1893 to 16 February 1895		José de la Puente y Bassavé, Governor	
16 February 1895 to 21 July 1895		Agustín Cuesta, acting Governor	
21 July 1895 to 19 May 1897		Adolfo de España y Gómez de Humarán, Governor	
19 May 1897 to 19 June 1897		Armando Pontes, acting Governor	
19 June 1897 to 21 July 1897		Mateo Mezquida, acting Governor	
21 July 1897 to 19 October 1897		Manuel Rico, Governor	
19 October 1897 to 7 November 1899		José Rodríguez de Vera, Governor	
7 November 1899 to 30 November 1899		Francisco Guarro, acting Governor	
30 November 1899 to 12 December 1899		Guillermo Lacave, acting Governor	
14 December 1899 to 3 March 1901		Francisco de Paula Dueñas Martínez, Governor	
3 March 1901 to 25 February 1905		José de Ibarra y Autrán, Governor	
25 February 1905 to 26 March 1906		José Gómez de la Serna, Governor	
26 March 1906 to 20 September 1906		Diego Saavedra y Magdalena, Governor	1st time
20 September 1906 to 18 February 1907		Ángel Barrera y Luyando, Governor	1st time
18 February 1907 to 17 August 1908		Luis Ramos Izquierdo y Vivar, Governor	
17 August 1908 to 30 September 1908		Luis Dabán, acting Governor	
30 September 1908 to 19 October 1908		Diego Saavedra y Magdalena, acting Governor	2nd time
19 October 1908 to 10 September 1910		José Centaño Anchorena, Governor	
10 September 1910 to 8 February 1924		Ángel Barrera y Luyando, Governor	2nd time
8 February 1924 to 8 February 1926		Carlos Tovar de Revilla, Governor	
8 February 1926 to 1 March 1931		Miguel Núñez de Prado, Governor	
1 January 1928 to 14 August 1928		Adolfo García Amilivia, acting Governor	Acting for Prado
2 August 1930 to 1 March 1931		José Domínguez Manresa, acting Governor	Acting for Prado
20 April 1931 to 1 November 1931		José Domínguez Manresa, interim Governor	1st time
1 November 1931 to 14 November 1932		Gustavo de Sostoa y Sthamer, Governor	
14 November 1931 to 15 November 1932		Pedro Agustín González Ordóñez, acting Governor	
15 November 1932 to 10 July 1933		José Domínguez Manresa, interim Governor	2nd time
10 July 1933 to 1 September 1934		Estanislao Lluesma García, Governor	
1 September 1934 to 5 September 1935		José Domínguez Manresa, acting Governor	3rd time
5 September 1934 to 10 December 1935		Ángel Manzaneque Feltrer, Governor	
15 June 1935 to 10 December 1935		Luis Serrano Maranges, acting Governor	Acting for Feltrer, 1st time
10 December 1935 to 25 September 1936		Luis Sánchez Guerra y Sáinz, Governor	
15 September 1936 to 25 September 1936		Estanislao Lluesma García, Governor	Appointed, did not take office
25 March 1936 to 12 April 1936		Carlos Vázquez Ruiz, acting Governor	Acting for Guerra y Sáinz
25 September 1936 to 1 January 1937		Luis Serrano Maranges, acting Governor	Nationalist, in rebellion on Fernando Pó from 19 September 1936; 2nd time
25 September 1936 to 14 October 1936		Miguel Hernández Porcel, Subgovernor	Republican, in dissidence in Río Muni
12 December 1936 to 14 December 1936		Carlos Vázquez Ruiz, acting Governor	Acting for Serrano
1 January 1937 to 15 December 1937		Manuel de Mendívil y Elío, Governor	
15 December 1937 to 5 March 1942		Juan Fontán Lobé, Governor	
12 June 1938 to 21 September 1938		Natividad Calzada y Castañeda, acting Governor	Acting for Fontán
30 August 1939 to 15 December 1939		Víctor Suances y Díaz del Río, acting Governor	Acting for Fontán
22 August 1940 to 16 September 1940		Fernando González Lavín, acting Governor	Acting for Fontán
16 September 1940 to 17 May 1941		Víctor Suances y Díaz del Río, acting Governor	Acting for Fontán
14 August 1941 to 13 October 1941		Pedro Cano Manuel Aubarede, acting Governor	Acting for Fontán
13 October 1941 to 5 March 1942		José Luis Soraluce Irastorza, acting Governor	Acting for Fontán
5 March 1942 to 12 February 1944		Mariano Alonso Alonso, Governor	
18 October 1943 to 12 February 1944		Rufino Pérez Barrueco, acting Governor	Acting for Alonso
12 February 1944 to 6 March 1949		Juan María Bonelli Rubio, Governor	
13 September 1944 to 2 March 1945		Joaquín Bosch de la Barrera, acting Governor	Acting for Bonelli
9 August 1946 to 22 February 1947		Joaquín Bosch de la Barrera, acting Governor	Acting for Bonelli
12 April 1948 to 8 August 1948		Carlos Rodríguez Solano y Dueñas, acting Governor	Acting for Bonelli
6 March 1949 to April 1949		Pedro Grajera Torres, acting Governor	
April 1949 to 21 February 1962		Faustino Ruíz González, Governor	
November 1953 to 1954		Hermenegildo Altozano Moraleda, acting Governor	Acting for Ruíz González
21 February 1962 to 1 January 1964		Francisco Núñez Rodríguez, Governor	A referendum on autonomy was held on 15 December 1963, approving the proposal
1 January 1964	Self-rule as Equatorial Guinea		
1 January 1964 to 10 March 1964		Francisco Núñez Rodríguez, Governor	
10 March 1964 to July 1964		Pedro Latorre Alcubierre, Governor	
July 1964 to August 1966		Pedro Latorre Alcubierre, Commissioner-General	
August 1966 to 12 October 1968		Víctor Suances y Díaz del Río, Commissioner-General	
12 October 1968	Independence as Republic of Equatorial Guinea		

For continuation after independence, see: List of presidents of Equatorial Guinea

== See also ==
- Politics of Equatorial Guinea
- List of presidents of Equatorial Guinea
- Vice President of Equatorial Guinea
- Prime Minister of Equatorial Guinea
