= Juan Fontán Lobé =

Spanish military officer and politician

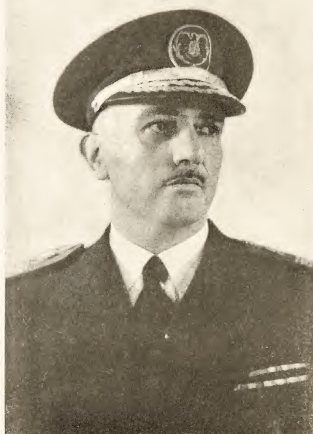
- Fontán on 4 April 1940

Governor of Spanish Guinea
- In office 15 December 1937 – 5 March 1942
- Caudillo: Francisco Franco
- Prime Minister: Francisco Franco
- President of the Technical State Junta: Fidel Dávila Arrondo; Francisco Gómez Jordana
- Minister of Foreign Affairs: Francisco Gómez Jordana; Juan Luis Beigbeder; Ramón Serrano Suñer
- Preceded by: Manuel de Mendívil y Elío
- Succeeded by: Mariano Alonso Alonso

Personal details
- Born: 21 August 1894 Palma de Mallorca, Kingdom of Spain
- Died: 14 July 1944 (aged 49) Madrid, Francoist Spain
- Party: FET y de las JONS
- Other political affiliations: Popular Action
- Occupation: Military officer and politician

Juan Fontán Lobé (21 August 1894 – 14 July 1944) was a Spanish military officer, artilleryman, naval engineer, notable Africanist bibliographer, great connoisseur of Spanish Guinea and procurator in Cortes.

== Biography ==
A civilian naval engineer, Fontán made a military career in the Rif War, where he survived the Disaster of Annual and was taken prisoner of war by the Rifians. He graduated as an artillery captain.

He was president of the Popular Action and owner of the newspaper Acción in Las Palmas, whose first issue appeared in April 1934.

During the early years of the Second Republic, he led street militias of the Popular Action youth groups that were often involved in political confrontations. These were part of the Nationalist takeover of public buildings in Las Palmas during the Spanish coup of July 1936. A companion of Francisco Franco in high school and during his promotion in artillery, Fontán remained as support for Luis Orgaz Yoldi in the Canary Islands in Franco's absence to assume command of the Army of Africa. He participated in the 1936 uprising in Spanish Guinea, including the bombing of the city of Bata, and temporarily assumed local authority, being responsible for instructing the proceedings against Republican officials and loyalists.

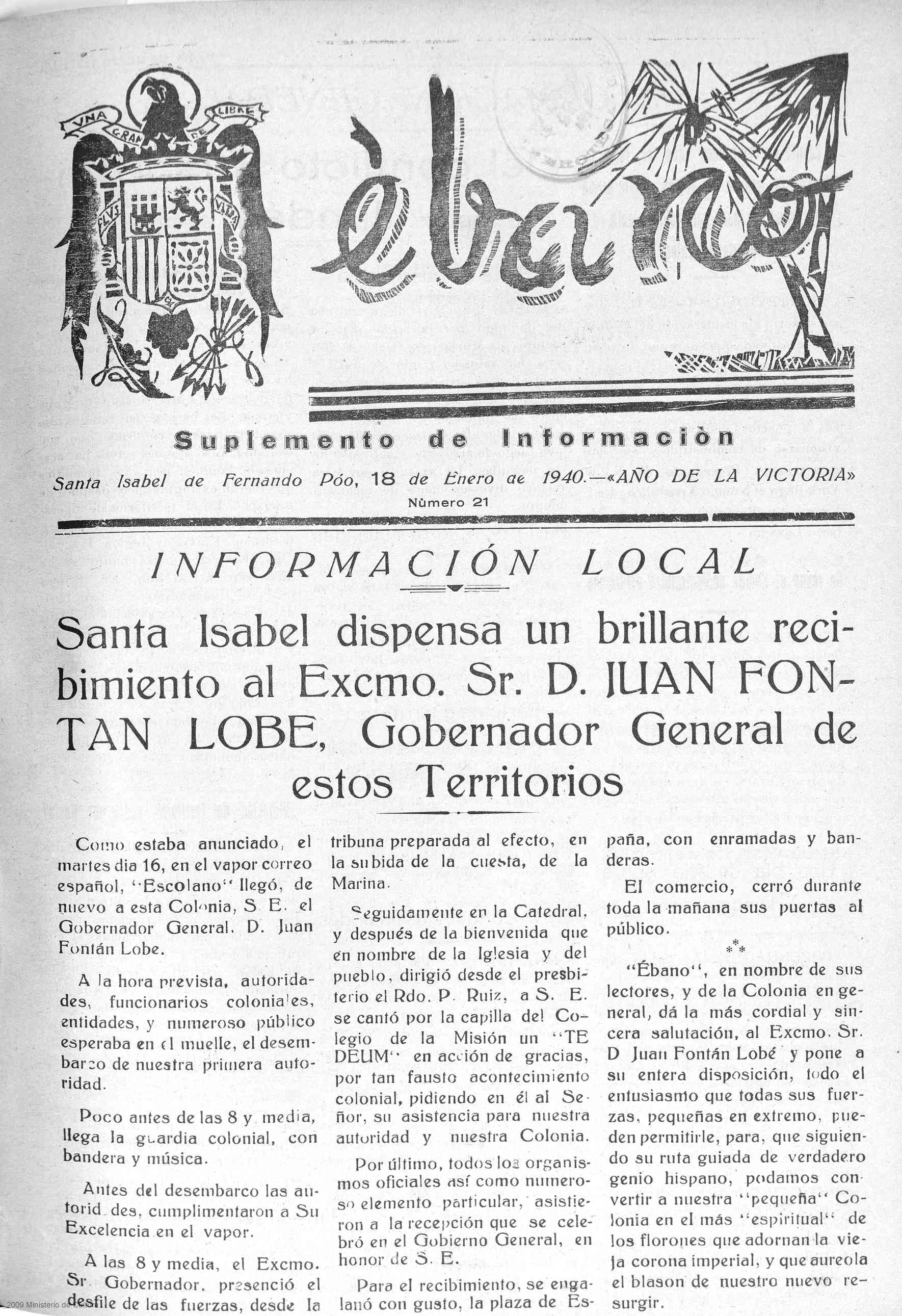
Front page of Ébano reporting on the arrival of Fontán as the new governor.

Requested to join Franco's headquarters in Salamanca, together with his brother Jesús he would design the methodology to collect information and prepare personal files in the Office of Information and Anti-Communist Propaganda (OIPA).

He was later appointed governor and Provincial Head of the FET y de las JONS of Spanish Guinea from October 1937 until January 1942, and resigned from office to be appointed director general of Morocco and Colonies.

Back in Spain, he was procurator in Cortes by direct appointment of Franco, during the I Legislature of the Spanish Cortes (1943–46). He died in office.

== Awards ==
Among Fontán's many decorations was the Grand Cross of the Order of Mehdauia, the Cross (with Red Decoration) of Military Merit, the Commander with Plaque of the Order of Isabella the Catholic, the Medal of Africa, Medal of the Canarian ex-combatant and silver plaque from the Santa Isabel Residents' Council.

Account on gratitude (1932) of the Ministry of the Navy at the request of José Giral, general director of Navigation, Fishing and Maritime Industries, for Fontán's advice to the Ministry on behalf of the Association of Naval Engineers.

In different towns such as Santa Isabel, Batete de Claret or Las Palmas streets were named after him.

== Collectionism ==
The historical documentation on Africa that Fontán collected throughout his life was distributed between the National Library and the Archive of the General State Administration in Alcalá de Henares. His legacy to the National Library is essential for its documentation on Equatorial Guinea.

Government offices
Preceded by Manuel de Mendívil y Elío	Governor of Spanish Guinea; 1937–1942	Succeeded by Mariano Alonso Alonso
