= Manuel de Mendívil =

Spanish writer and sailor

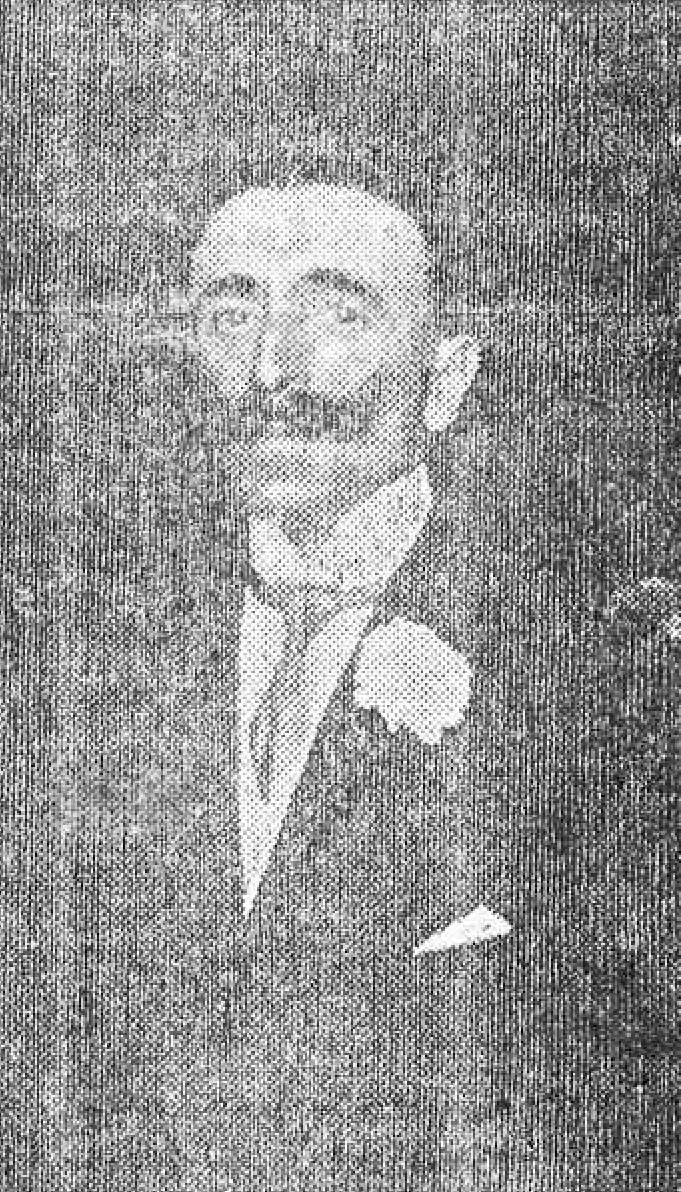
- Mendívil on 10 July 1911

Governor of Spanish Guinea
- In office 1 January 1937 – 15 December 1937
- Preceded by: Carlos Vázquez Ruiz
- Succeeded by: Juan Fontán Lobé

Personal details
- Born: Manuel de Mendívil y Elío; 4 November 1874 Madrid, First Spanish Republic
- Died: 5 April 1942 (aged 67) San Sebastián, Francoist Spain
- Spouse: Rosario Martínez de Irujo y Caro del Alcázar y Széchenyi
- Occupation: Writer and sailor

Manuel de Mendívil y Elío (4 November 1874 – 5 April 1942) was a Spanish writer and sailor, as well as colonial administrator, who served as governor of Spanish Guinea in 1937.

== Biography ==
Mendivil, as a writer and sailor, collaborated with the magazine Mundo Naval (1897–1899) and was also the director of the magazine Alrededor del Mundo and the literary collection Los Contemporáneos.

Among his works were titles such as Shadows (novel travels) (1910), Misty Countries (novel travels) (1911), Twilight of the Kings (1911), Love, Eternal Love (1912), The Story of Many Lives (1913), Sentimental Journey (1918) and Mendez Nuñez, Hero of Callao (1930) – a biography of the fellow sailor Casto Méndez Núñez – and others.

During the Spanish Civil War, he was appointed governor of Spanish Guinea by the Nationalists after the end of hostilities in the colony in October 1936. He died in the Gipuzkoan city of San Sebastián on 5 April 1942. He was married to Rosario Martínez de Irujo y Caro del Alcázar y Széchenyi, who survived him.

== See also ==
- Juan Sebastián de Elcano — training ship of the Spanish Navy, whose first commanding officer was Manuel de Mendívil.

Government offices
Preceded by Carlos Vázquez Ruiz	Governor of Spanish Guinea; 1937	Succeeded by Juan Fontán Lobé
