= Spanish training ship Juan Sebastián de Elcano =

Schooner of the Spanish Navy

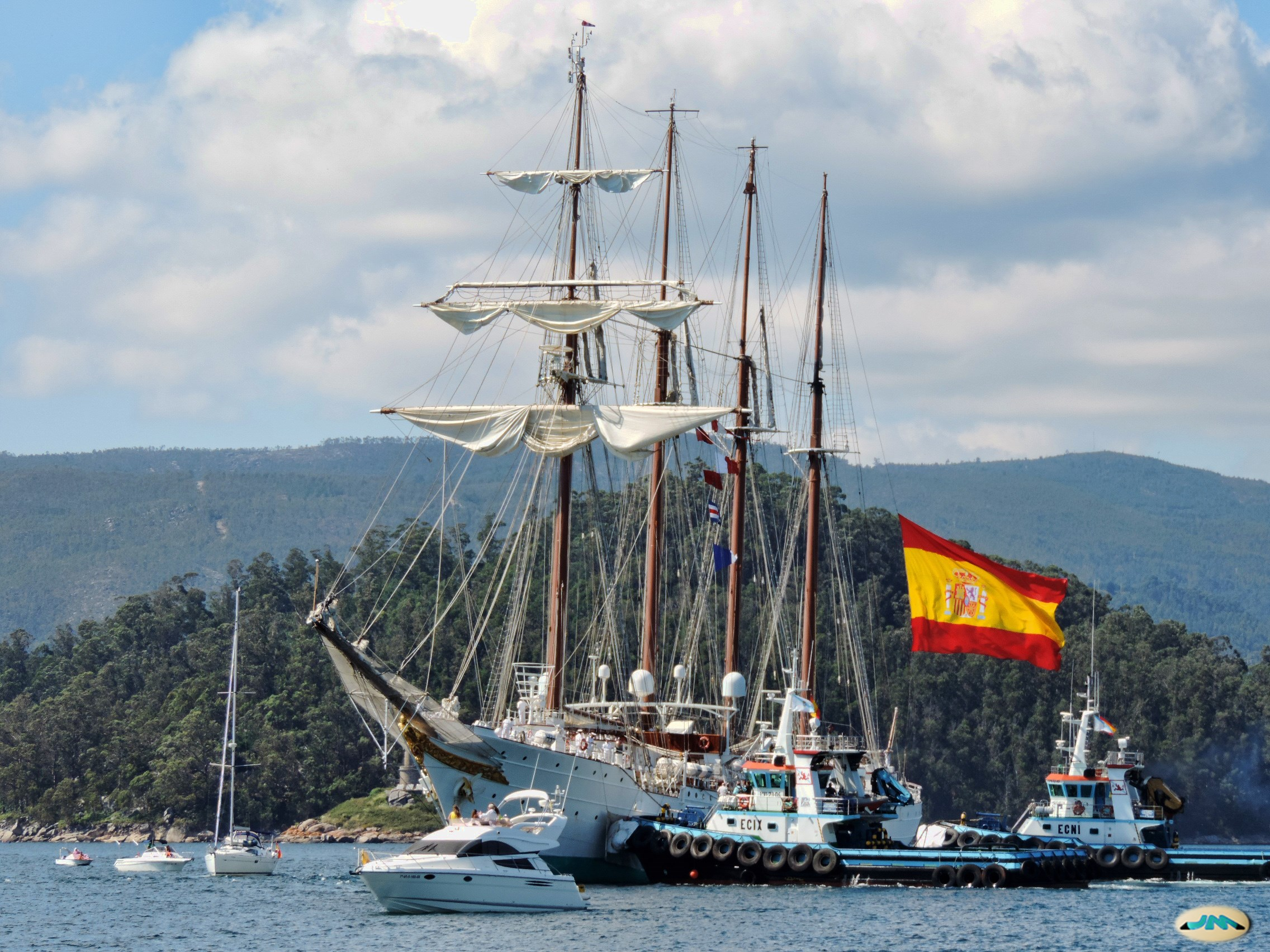
- Juan Sebastián de Elcano at Pontevedra, Spain.

History

Spain
- Name: Juan Sebastian de Elcano
- Namesake: Juan Sebastián Elcano
- Operator: Spanish Navy
- Ordered: 17 April 1925
- Builder: Echevarrieta y Larrinaga yard, Cadiz, Spain
- Launched: 5 March 1927
- Commissioned: August 1928
- Maiden voyage: 19 April 1928
- Home port: Cadiz, Spain
- Identification: IMO number: 8642567; MMSI number: 224977000; Callsign: EBCB
- Status: Active
- Badge

General characteristics
- Type: Training ship
- Displacement: 3673 tons
- Length: 113 m (371 ft)
- Beam: 13.11 m (43.0 ft)
- Height: 48.5 m (159 ft)
- Draft: 7 m (23 ft)
- Sail plan: four-masted barquentine; 21 sails, total sail area of 2,870 m^{2} (30,900 sq ft)
- Speed: max 13 knots (24 km/h; 15 mph) engine; 17.5 knots (32.4 km/h; 20.1 mph) sail
- Complement: 300 sailors, 90 midshipmen
- Armament: 2 × 57 mm ceremonial gun mounts
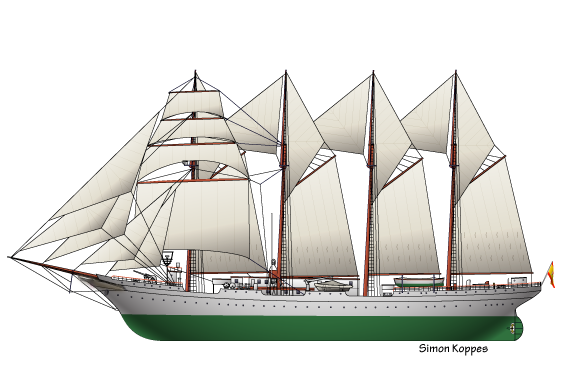
- Notes: Line art of Juan Sebastián de Elcano Line art of Juan Sebastián de Elcano

Juan Sebastián de Elcano is a training ship of the Spanish Navy. She is a steel-hulled, four-masted topsail barquentine. At 113 metres (371 ft) long, she is the third-largest tall ship in the world, and is the sailing vessel that has sailed the farthest, covering more than 2,000,000 nautical miles (3,700,000 km; 2,300,000 mi) in her lifetime.

She is named after the Spanish explorer Juan Sebastián Elcano, captain of Ferdinand Magellan's last exploratory fleet and the man who completed the first circumnavigation of the world. The ship carries the Elcano coat of arms, which was granted to the family by Holy Roman Emperor Charles V, who also was King Charles I of Spain, following Elcano's return in 1522 from Magellan's global expedition. The coat of arms is a globe with the motto "Primus Circumdedisti Me" ("First to circumnavigate me").

== Design and construction ==
Juan Sebastián de Elcano was built in 1927 in Cádiz, Spain, and her hull was designed by the naval architect Mr C E Nicholson of Camper and Nicholsons Ltd of Southampton, England. She was constructed by Echevarrieta y Larrinaga shipyard in Cádiz. Her plans were used 25 years later to construct her sister ship, the Chilean Navy sail training vessel Esmeralda, in 1952–1954.

She conducted sea trials between April and July 1928 including a voyage from Cádiz to Málaga with King Alfonso XIII on board as a passenger. After she was commissioned in August 1928, she made her maiden voyage, calling at Sevilla, Las Palmas, Tenerife, San Sebastián, Cádiz, São Vicente, Montevideo, Buenos Aires, Cape Town, Adelaide, Melbourne, Sydney, Suva, San Francisco, Balboa, Havana, New York City, and Cádiz.

After the proclamation of the Second Spanish Republic in April 1931 the ship became part of the Spanish Republican Navy. In 1933 under Commander Salvador Moreno Fernández's order, a series of improvements were made to the ship and the bronze plate with the Latin language inscription Tu Primus Circumdedisti Me was placed near the prow. At the time of the coup of July 1936, Juan Sebastián de Elcano was in Ferrol, a harbor that had been taken by the Nationalist faction.

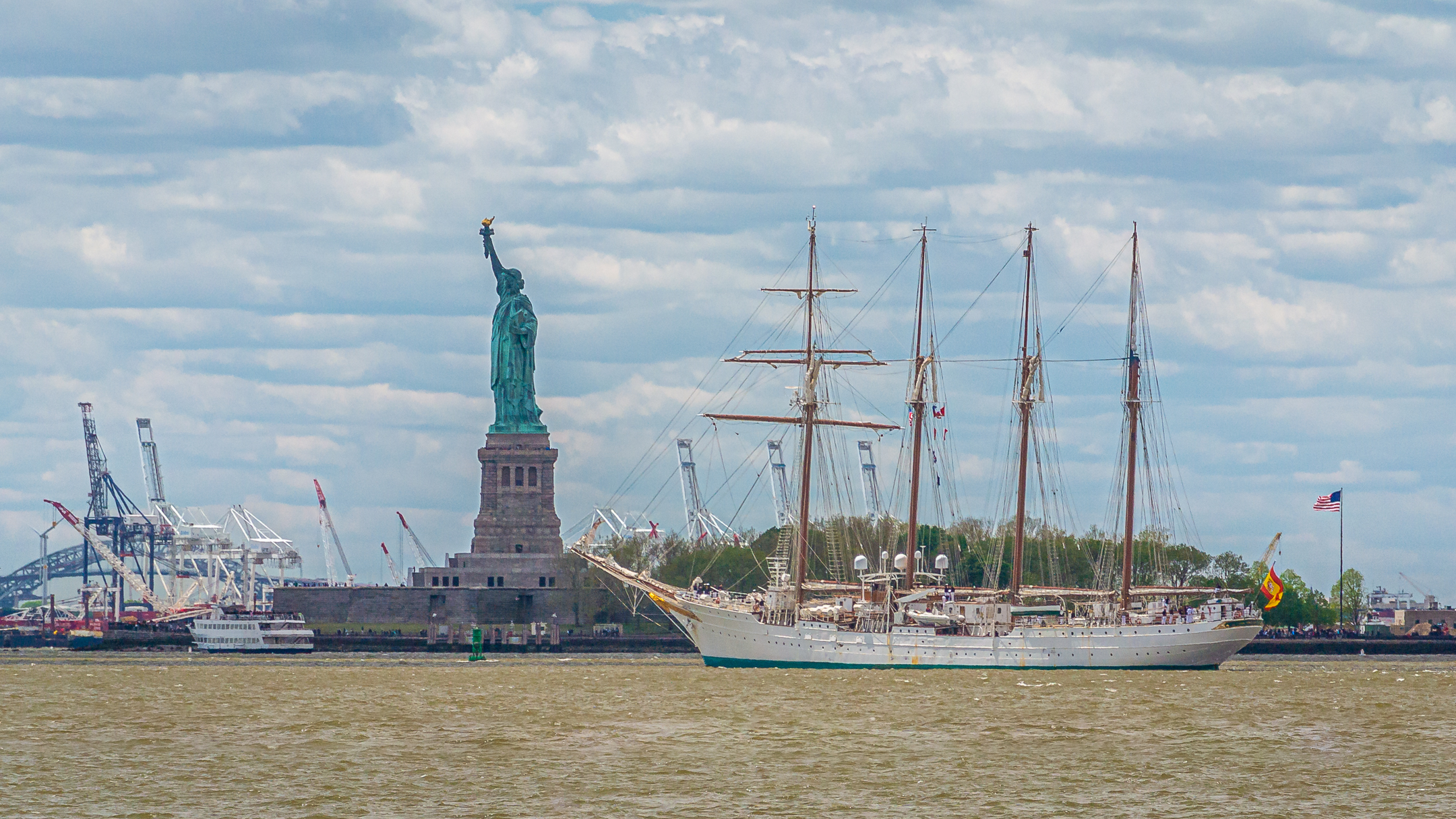
Juan Sebastián de Elcano (A-71) passing in front of the Statue of Liberty at New York City on May 8, 2017.

== Commanding officers ==
The commanding officers of Juan Sebastián de Elcano:

- Manuel de Mendivil y Elio. 29 September 1927
- Claudio Lago de Lanzos y Díaz. 4 June 1929
- Joaquín López Cortijo. 5 June 1931
- Salvador Moreno Fernández. 7 June 1933
- Cristóbal González-Aller y Acebal. 24 June 1935
- Fernando Meléndez Bojart. 15 December
- Pedro Sans Torres. 20 December 1940
- Camilo Carrero Blanco. 17 January 1942
- Antonio Blanco García. 24 November 1942
- Leopoldo Boado Endeiza. 27 June 1944
- Manuel de la Puente y Magallanes. 18 July 1946
- Álvaro de Urzáiz y de Silva. 15 July 1948
- Luis Cebreiro Blanco. 3 August 1950
- Gonzalo Díaz García. 15 July 1952
- José Yusty Pita. 19 August 1953
- José Ramón González López. 20 July 1955
- Miguel Domingo Sotelo. 27 August 1958
- José Díaz Cuñado. 26 September 1960
- Teodoro de Leste y Cisneros. 22 December 1961
- Francisco Javier de Elizalde y Laínez. 6 August 1963
- Salvador Vázquez Durán. 18 November 1964
- Francisco Gil de Sola y Caballero. 17 August 1966
- Álvaro Fontanals Baron. 20 September 1968
- Agustín Rosety Caro. 1 August 1970
- Ricardo Vallespín Raurell. 28 September 1971
- Marcial Fournier Palicio. 1 September 1973
- Antonio Nalda y Díaz de Tuesta. 26 September 1975
- Ángel Luis Díaz del Río y Martínez. 3 October 1977
- Ignacio Cela Diz. 3 de October 1979
- Cristóbal Colón de Carvajal y Maroto. 7 January 1981
- Rafael Ceñal Fernández. 30 October 1982
- Manuel de la Puente y Sicre. 19 August 1983
- Antonio Diufain de Alba. 23 August 1984
- Rafael Martí Narbona. 15 November 1985
- Gabriel Portal Antón. 10 July 1987
- José Alejandro Artal Delgado. 25 November 1988
- Pedro Lapique Quiñones. 3 October 1989
- Rafael Vallejo Ruiz. 4 October 1991
- Ángel Tajuelo y Pardo de Andrade. 1 October 1992
- Juan José González-Irún y Sánchez. 8 October 1993
- Antonio González-Aller y Suevos. 4 October 1994
- Manuel Calvo Freijomil. 15 September 1995
- Sebastián Zaragoza Soto. 18 September 1996
- Teodoro de Leste y Contreras. 2 October 1997
- Constantino Lobo Franco. 11 September 1998
- Juan C. Muñoz-Delgado y Díaz del Río. 8 October 1999
- Jaime Rodríguez-Toubes y Núñez. 6 October 2000
- Manuel Rebollo García. 5 October 2001
- Santiago Bolívar Piñeiro. 4 October 2002
- Juan F. Martínez Núñez. 3 October 2003
- Luis Cayetano y Garrido. 29 September 2004
- Salvador M. Delgado Moreno. 29 September 2005
- Javier Romero Caramelo. 21 September 2007
- Manuel de la Puente y Mora-Figueroa. 25 September 2009
- Alfonso Carlos Gómez y Fernández de Córdoba. 23 September 2011
- Enrique Torres Piñeyro. 19 September 2013
- Victoriano Gilabert Agote. 23 July 2015
- Ignacio Paz García. 28 July 2017
- Santiago de Colsa Trueba. 23 July 2019
- Manuel García Ruiz. 1 July 2021
- Luís Carreras-Presas do Campo. 27 July 2023

== See also ==
- Fernando Villaamil, who made a circumnavigation of the world in 1892–1894 in command of the training ship.Nautilus
- Ferrol
- Spanish Naval Academy In modern times, institution where Spanish Navy and other officers and enlisted personnel receive their education
- El Galatea (also known as Glenlee), the Training Tall Ship for the Spanish Navy from 1922 to 1969, based at Ferrol in northwestern Spain
- El Club Naval de Ferrol, originally designed for the amusement of the Spanish Navy personnel and their families posted to the naval station at Ferrol.
- Structure of the Spanish Navy in the 21st century
- List of large sailing vessels
- List of schooners
