= Cristóbal Colón de Carvajal, 18th Duke of Veragua =

Spanish grandee, explorer and helicopter pilot

The Most Excellent The Duke of Veragua 20th Admiral of the Ocean Sea
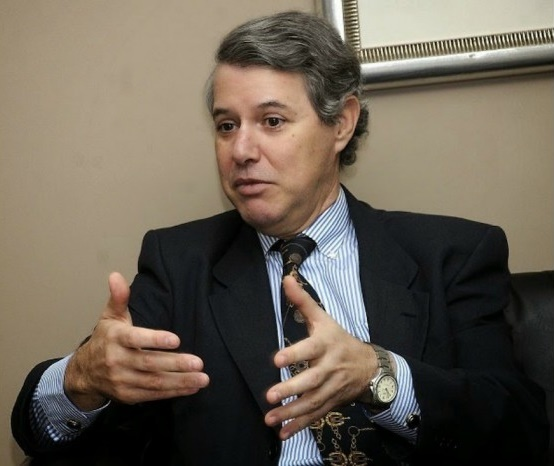
- The Duke of Veragua, 2011

Ambassador-at-large for the Commemorative Events of the 500th Anniversary of the Fourth Voyage of Columbus
- In office 10 May 2002 – 8 September 2006
- Monarch: King Juan Carlos I
- Prime Minister: José María Aznar; José Luis Rodríguez Zapatero

Personal details
- Born: Cristóbal Colón de Carvajal y Gorosábel; 4 October 1949 (age 77) Madrid, Spain
- Spouse: Isabel Elena Mandalúniz y Castelo d'Ortega
- Children: Cristóbal Colón de Carvajal y Mandalúniz; Ángel Santiago Colón de Carvajal y Mandalúniz
- Parents: The 17th Duke of Veragua; Anunciada Gorosábel y Ramírez de Haro
- Education: Colegio del Pilar
- Profession: Naval officer

Military service
- Branch: Spanish Navy
- Rank: Capitán de Fragata

Cristóbal Colón de Carvajal y Gorosábel, 18th Duke of Veragua, GE, (born 4 October 1949) is a Spanish nobleman, businessman and formerly a Spanish Navy officer.

He is a direct descendant of Christopher Columbus by way of Christopher's son, Diego. From Diego, Colón de Carvajal also holds the Duchy of Veragua since 1986. As the Duchy corresponds to the present-day Veraguas Province of the independent republic of Panama, the Duke maintains close connections with Panamanian society, and serves on the advisory board of Petaquilla Minerals, a mining company.

In 1986, he inherited from his father, the 17th Duke of Veragua, all of his titles after the 17th Duke was murdered by the Basque terrorist organization ETA.

In 2011, his additional title as Duke of La Vega was among many to be passed on to different successors, with the new Duke of la Vega being Colón's son, Ángel Santiago Colón de Mandalúniz.

In 1992, to commemorate the 500th anniversary of Columbus's landing on Hispaniola, Colón de Carvajal was co-designated grand marshal of the Tournament of Roses Parade, alongside US Congressman Ben Nighthorse Campbell.

From May 2002 to September 2006, he served as Spain's ambassador-at-large for the Commemorative Events of the 500th Anniversary (Quincentennial) of the Fourth Voyage of Columbus.

== Titles, honours and styles ==
In 1974, his father granted him the title of Marquess of Jamaica. After his father's death in February 1986, he inherited the rest of the family titles, becoming 18th Duke of Veragua (GE), 17th Duke of La Vega (GE), 18th Marquess of Jamaica and 20th Admiral of the Ocean Sea. In 2011, he granted his second son, Ángel Santiago, the Dukedom of La Vega.

=== Styles ===
- 4 October 1949 – 30 October 1974: Don Cristóbal Colón de Carvajal y Gorosábel
- 30 October 1974 – 22 October 1986: The Most Illustrious The Marquess of Jamaica
- 22 October 1986 – present: His Excellency The Duke of Veragua, Grandee of Spain

=== Honours ===
- Grand Cross of Naval Merit, with White Decoration (13 June 2023)

Spanish nobility
Preceded by Vice Admiral; Cristóbal Colón de Carvajal	Duke of la Vega; 1986–2011	Succeeded by Ángel Santiago Colón de Mandalúniz
Preceded by Vice Admiral; Cristóbal Colón de Carvajal	Duke of Veragua; 1986–present	Incumbent
