= Víctor Suances y Díaz del Río =

Last colonial governor of Spanish Guiena

Commissioner-General of Spanish Guinea
- In office 12 August 1966 – 12 October 1968
- Prime Minister: Bonifacio Ondó Edú
- Preceded by: Pedro Latorre Alcubierre
- Succeeded by: Position abolished (Francisco Macías Nguema as president)

Governor of Spanish Guinea
- In office 16 September 1940 – 17 May 1941; Acting Governor
- Preceded by: Fernando González Lavín
- Succeeded by: Pedro Cano Manuel Aubarede
- In office 30 August 1939 – 15 December 1939; Acting Governor
- Preceded by: Natividad Calzada y Castañeda
- Succeeded by: Fernando González Lavín

Personal details
- Born: 6 May 1902 Ferrol, A Coruña, Galicia, Bourbon Spain (Restoration) (now Ferrol, A Coruña, Galicia, Spain)
- Died: 29 May 1986 (aged 84) Madrid, Community of Madrid, Spain
- Occupation: Military officer

Military service
- Allegiance: Spain

Víctor Suances y Díaz del Río (6 May 1902 – 29 May 1986) was a Spanish military officer who served as the last colonial administrator of Spanish Guinea from August 1966 until the independence of Equatorial Guinea in October 1968. During his tenure as colonial administrator, Spanish Guinea held a constitutional referendum and a general election in the months leading to independence, in which Francisco Macías Nguema was elected as the country's first president.

Political offices
Preceded by Pedro Latorre Alcubierre	Commissioner-General of Spanish Guinea; 1966–1968	Succeeded by Francisco Macías Nguema (as president)
Preceded by Fernando González Lavín (acting)	Governor of Spanish Guinea (acting); 1940–1941	Succeeded by Pedro Cano Manuel Aubarede (acting)
Preceded by Natividad Calzada y Castañeda (acting)	Governor of Spanish Guinea (acting); 1939	Succeeded by Fernando González Lavín (acting)
