= Cristóbal Colón de Carvajal, 17th Duke of Veragua =

Spanish Navy officer (1925–1986)

Admiral of the Ocean Sea The Most Excellent The Duke of Veragua GE
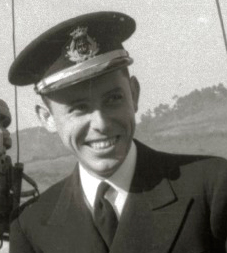
- Pictured in 1950

Personal details
- Born: Cristóbal Colón de Carvajal y Maroto; 29 January 1925 Madrid, Spain
- Died: 6 February 1986 (aged 61) Madrid, Spain
- Spouse: Anunciada de Gorosábel y Ramírez de Haro (m. 1949) (1925-2009)
- Children: Cristóbal Colón de Carvajal, 18th Duke of Veragua; Diego Colón de Carvajal y Gorosábel; Alfonso Colón de Carvajal y Gorosábel; María de la Anunciada Colón de Carvajal y Gorosábel; Ignacio Colón de Carvajal y Gorosábel; Jaime Colón de Carvajal y Gorosábel
- Parents: Ramón Colón de Carvajal y Hurtado de Mendoza; María Eulalia Maroto y Pérez del Pulgar
- Profession: Naval officer

Military service
- Branch/service: Spanish Navy
- Years of service: 1943–86
- Rank: Vice admiral

Vice admiral Cristóbal Colón de Carvajal y Maroto, 17th Duke of Veragua, GE (born 29 January 1925 – 6 February 1986) was a Spanish Navy officer, statesman and descendant of Christopher Columbus. He also held the titles of 16th Duke of la Vega, 17th Marquess of Jamaica, 20th Marquess of Aguilafuente and 20th Admiral and Adelantado of the Indies, positions that had been held by his father and all of his direct paternal ancestors up to Christopher Columbus, who took on the duties with the Discovery of America in 1492.

In 1986, Colón de Carvajal and his personal driver were killed by Basque separatist group Euskadi Ta Askatasuna (ETA), which had opened fire at the car they were travelling in and tossed a hand grenade inside, near Paseo de la Castellana in Madrid, Spain. Along with the assassination of Carrero Blanco in 1973, he was the most prominent figure to have been assassinated by the organization.

== Early life ==
Colón was born in Madrid to a prominent noble family who held numerous titles in the peerage of Spain. His father, Ramón Colón de Carvajal y Hurtado de Mendoza, 16th Duke of Veragua was born in Madrid in 1898. His mother, María Eulalia Maroto y Pérez del Pulgar, was born in 1897 to the Marquess of Santo Domingo and his wife, the Marchioness of Pozoblanco. Through his mother, Colón descended from the House of Maroto and was a great-grandson of Carlist general Rafael Maroto.

== Career ==
=== Early career ===
He entered as an applicant at the Escuela Naval Militar in 1943, as a component of the 348 Promotion of the General Corps. He was promoted to officer cadet in 1945, to conclude his training at the Escuela Naval on 15 December 1948, at which time he was delivered the office of alférez de navío. His first post was in the flagship of the Spanish Fleet, Canarias.

=== Admiral of the Ocean Sea ===
With his commission as an officer in 1948, Colón succeeded his late father as Duke of Veragua, Duke of la Vega, Admiral of the Ocean Sea, Admiral of the Indies and Adelantado of the Indies at the early age of 23.

After being Second Commander of the Tugboat Cíclope, he received the command of the patrolman Lanzón (V-18). When he was promoted to lieutenant of ship, he received the command of the coastguard Pegaso, and after completing the specialist course in Submarine Weapons, he was handed the command of the tugboat in functions of Patrolman RR-20.

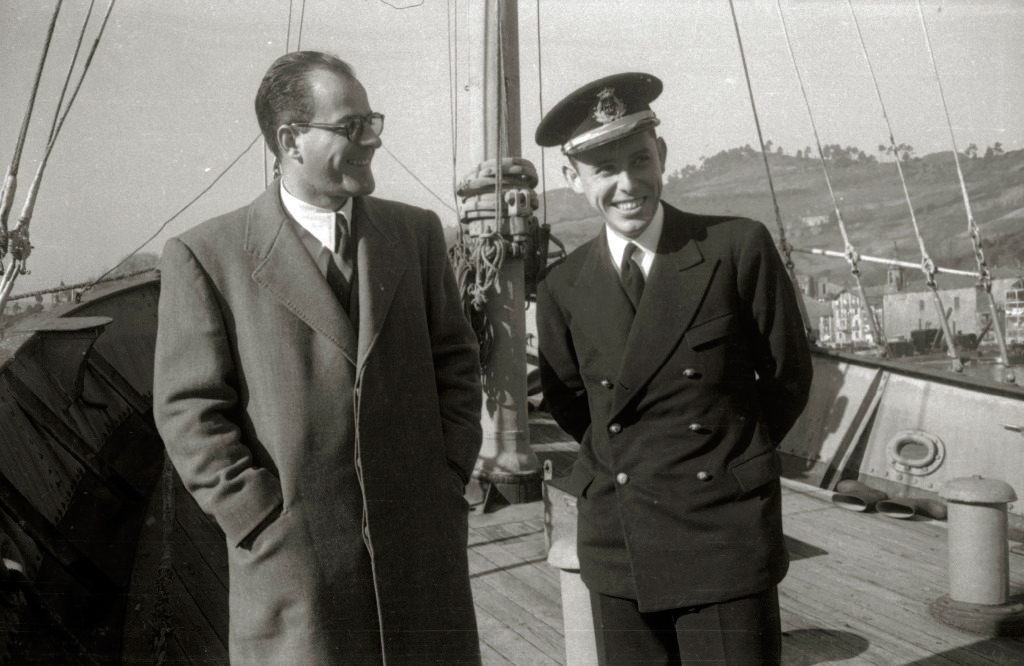
A young Colón (right) as commander of the surveillance vessel "V-18" in Pasaia, 1950

He was promoted to Corvette captain in 1964 and appointed second commander of the destroyer Almirante Miranda, later moving to the Ministry of the Navy. By this time Colón had already become popular amongst the navy staff, and had built a good reputation.

He was promoted to the rank of frigate captain in 1975, and by Decree Law on 17 December 1977, he was given command of the Fletcher-class destroyer Almirante Valdés (D-23) (former USS Converse (DD-509), one of the destroyers granted by the US) which he held until 18 June 1979. During his time as frigate captain, he was awarded the Silver Medal of the Salvation Society of the Shipwrecked, for having rescued the seventeen members of the fishing crew of Onubenses, which sunk.

When he was promoted in 1980 to ship captain, he was given the command of the training ship of the Spanish Navy, the barquentine Juan Sebastian Elcano. As ship captain, he departed on 8 January 1981 from Cádiz with course to Santa Cruz de Tenerife, Rio de Janeiro, Montevideo, Buenos Aires, Punta Arenas, Valparaíso, Callao, Balboa, crossed the Panama Canal and cruised to Pensacola, New York, Saint-Malo, Melilla, Livorno and arrived to the Bay of Cádiz 3 August of the same year.

He was promoted to the rank of rear admiral in 1983, and continued with his duties within the Ministry of Defence and especially in the Institute of Naval History and Culture. In 1984 he was promoted to vice admiral, and went on to hold office in the Navy Staff.

== Death ==
=== Assassination ===
The attack took place on Thursday 6 February 1986 at 10:20 a.m. His car, a brown Talbot 1800 driven by 55-year-old chauffeur Manuel Trillo, occupied by Vice Admiral Colón de Carvajal and his assistant, 45-year-old Antonio Rodríguez Toube, who was in the back seat of the car, was headed down Calle del Tambre from the corner with Balbina Valverde. The chauffeur had to reduce speed when reaching a narrow part of the road. According to witnesses, two young men "posted on both sides of the street, machine-gunned the vehicle in crossfire." Almost at the same time, one of the ETA members tossed a hand grenade inside the vehicle, while the other members of the commando continued firing from the opposite sidewalk.

In spite of the bloodshed and having been severely wounded, Commander Antonio Rodríguez Toube, Colón's personal assistant, survived the attack almost miraculously.

=== Funeral ===
The funeral for the Duke of Veragua and driver Manuel Trillo was held the following morning, at the General Headquarters of the Navy, in Madrid. The remains of both victims were buried that afternoon.

== Honours ==
- Grandee of Spain
- Grand Cross of the Order of Isabella the Catholic
- Grand Cross of the Order of the Civil recognition (posthumous)
- Grand Cross of Naval Merit (white distinction)
- Grand Cross of the Order of Christopher Columbus
- Cross of the Royal and Military Order of Saint Hermenegild
- Knight of the Order of Santiago
- Cross of the Order of Vasco Núñez de Balboa
- Cross of the Order of May
- Cross of the Order of Merit of Chile
- Cross of the Naval Merit of Peru
- Cross of Naval Merit of Brazil
- Cross of the Special Merit of Mexico
- Commemorative medal of the 400th anniversary of the Battle of Lepanto
- Fellow of the Royal Academy of History
- Fellow of honour of the Royal Academy of Social and Natural Sciences of Extremadura
- Fellow of the Italian Academy of History
- Fellow of the Dominican Academy of History
- Fellow of the Paraguayan Academy of History
- Fellow of the Porto Rican Academy of History
- Member of the Permanent Commission of the Deputation of the Grandeza of Spain
- President of the Royal Body of Nobility of Madrid
- President of the Royal Association of Noblemen of Spain
- Spokesperson of the Naval Museum of Madrid
- Member of the Commission of the 500th anniversary of the Discovery of America
- President and founder of the Italo-Hispanic Cultural Association "Christopher Columbus".
- President of the Spanish Scouts (Bestowed with the "Silver Wolf", highest scout distinction)

=== Arms ===
Coat of arms of Cristóbal Colón de Carvajal, 17th Duke of Veragua
Coronet Coronet of Grandee of Spain. Escutcheon Quartered shield: First, the arms of Castile (in gules field, a castle of gold clarified by azure); Second, the arms of León (in silver field a rampant lion of gules crowned with gold); Third, in a sea of azure some islands of gold; Fourth, in field of azure five anchors of gold and placed in blade; the shield entangled in point with the primitive arms of Columbus (in field of gold a band of azur and head of gules). Orders Order of Isabella the Catholic ribbon Cross of the Order of Santiago Other elements An heraldic mantle used by the Grandees of Spain.

== See also ==
- Christopher Columbus
- House of Maroto

Spanish nobility
Preceded by Ramón Colón de Carvajal y Hurtado de Mendoza	Duke of Veragua; 1941–1986	Succeeded by Cristobal Colón de Carvajal, 18th Duke of Veragua
Preceded by Ramón Colón de Carvajal, 16th Duke of Veragua	Duke of la Vega; 1941–1986	Succeeded by Cristobal Colón de Carvajal, 18th Duke of Veragua
