= Barraza =

Barraza or Barrasa may refer to:

== People with the surname ==
- Adriana Barraza (born 1956), Mexican actress, acting teacher and director
- Jacinto Barraza (born 17th century - died 1704), Peruvian Jesuit historian
- Juana Barraza (born 1957), Mexican former professional wrestler and serial killer
- Julio Barraza (born 1980), Argentine footballer
- Juan Francisco Barraza (1935–1997), Salvadoran footballer
- Pancho Barraza (born 1961), Mexican singer/songwriter

== Places ==
- Estadio Juan Francisco Barraza, a multi-purpose stadium in San Miguel, El Salvador

== Other ==
- Barraza (katydid), a genus of katydids in the subfamily Tettigoniinae
