= Miguel Núñez de Prado =

Spanish military officer

Major General Miguel Núñez de Prado
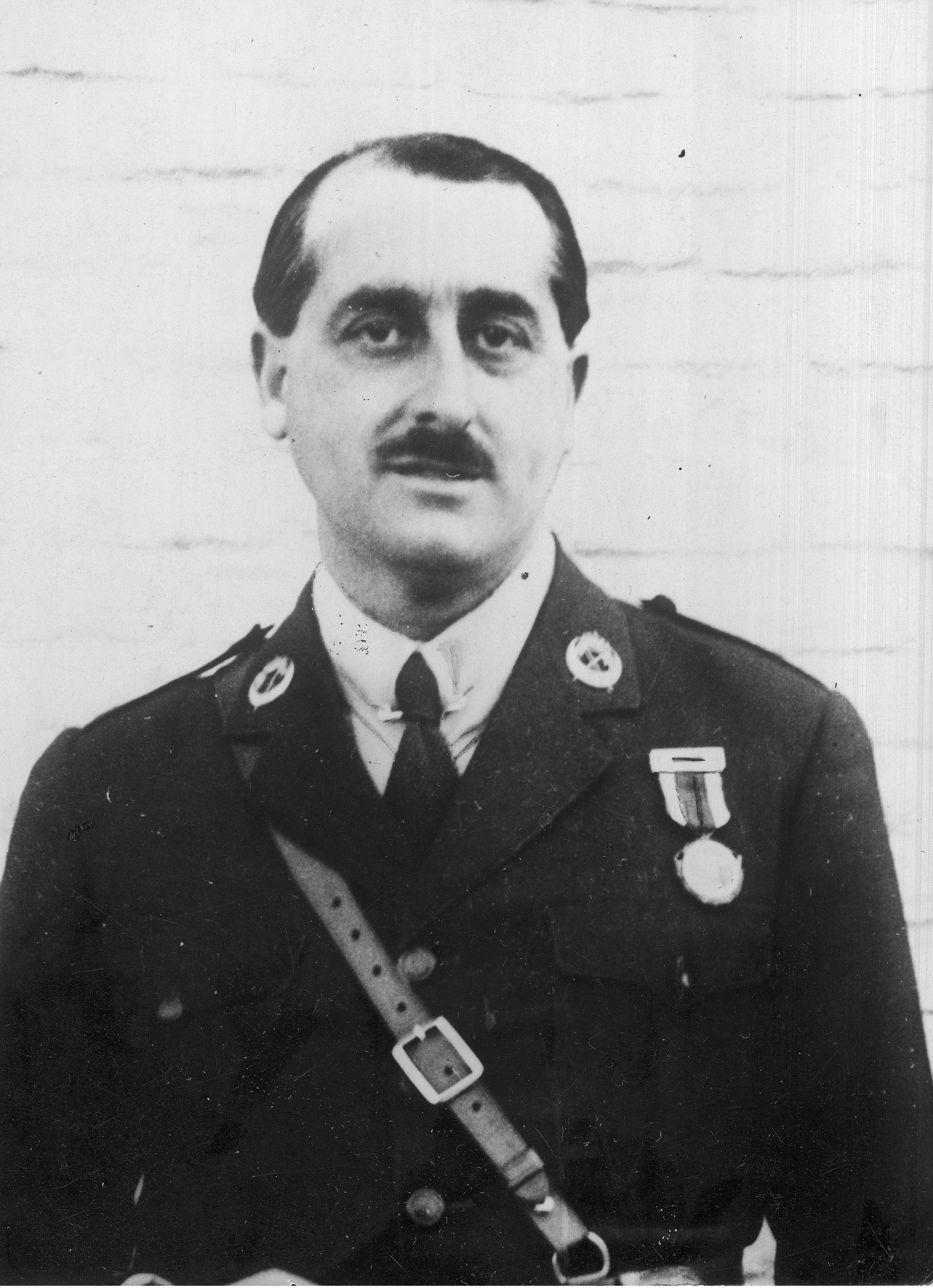
- Núñez de Prado c. 1925–1926

Governor General of Spanish Guinea
- In office 8 February 1926 – 1 March 1931
- Monarch: Alfonso XIII
- Preceded by: Carlos Tovar de Revilla
- Succeeded by: José Domínguez Manresa (interim)

Personal details
- Born: Miguel Núñez de Prado y Susbielas; 30 March 1882 Montilla, Spain
- Died: 24 July 1936 (aged 54) (disappeared) Pamplona, Spain
- Spouse: Aurora Bermejo (m. 1908)
- Occupation: Military officer, aviator

Military service
- Allegiance: Kingdom of Spain; Spanish Republic
- Branch/service: Spanish Army
- Years of service: 1897–1936
- Rank: Major general
- Unit: Regulares
- Commands: Spanish Aviation Corps
- Battles/wars: Spanish–American War; Bombardment of San Juan; Rif War (WIA); Spanish Civil War (POW)

Miguel Núñez de Prado y Susbielas (30 March 1882 – disappeared 24 July 1936) was a Spanish military officer and aviator. He was Governor General of Spanish Guinea from 1926 to 1931 and Governor of the Balearic Islands from 1932 to 1934. He disappeared during the first week of the Spanish Civil War after being imprisoned at Fort San Cristóbal.

== Biography ==
Miguel Núñez de Prado y Susbielas was born on 30 March 1882 in Montilla, Spain. His father was a cavalry general and his grandfather was an infantry captain. In 1897, Núñez de Prado enlisted as a volunteer in the engineer corps of the Captaincy General of Puerto Rico. He engaged in combat during the Bombardment of San Juan of the Spanish–American War. After the war, Núñez de Prado returned to Spain and enrolled in the Cavalry Academy. After four years, he was promoted to lieutenant. In 1910, Núñez de Prado was deployed at the Melilla Squadron Group in the Spanish protectorate in Morocco. In 1911, he saw combat in the Rif War and was wounded in action.

In 1913, Núñez de Prado joined the Spanish Army's pilot school but he did not complete the aviation course. He served in the Regulares from 1919 to 1923 and saw further combat in the Rif War, being wounded in action again. He returned to Spain and completed his aviation training in 1924. He was assigned to the 1st Aviation Regiment. In 1925, the Montilla municipal commission changed the name of Fuente Álamo Street to Colonel Núñez de Prado Street; it was renamed later that year to General Núñez de Prado Street when he was promoted to brigadier general.

In 1925, Núñez de Prado became the governor general of Spanish Guinea. He arrived at Santa Isabel in February 1926 and assumed command of the colony. During his governorship, Núñez de Prado protected the rights of Spanish settlers and businesses. Laborers worked in poor conditions and trafficking was common. His tenure was criticized by the El Socialista newspaper. Núñez de Prado returned to Spain in September 1930 and was promoted to major general. Spanish aviator Ignacio Hidalgo de Cisneros alleged that Núñez de Prado was involved in a December 1930 military conspiracy in Cuatro Vientos, but Núñez de Prado was not listed in a list of suspected participants. He returned to Spanish Guinea in 1931.

Núñez de Prado was the military governor of the Balearic Islands from 1932 to 1934. He served as the commander of the 2nd Division in 1934, the 2nd General Inspector of the Army in 1935, and the commander of the Spanish Aviation Corps in 1936.

== Personal life ==
Núñez de Prado married Aurora Bermejo in 1908. He had a relationship with Luisa Beaux while he was governor of Spanish Guinea. Núñez de Prado was a freemason.

== Disappearance ==
Núñez de Prado opposed the military rebellion against the Second Spanish Republic that began on 17 July 1936. The following day, Núñez de Prado traveled to Zaragoza to convince General Miguel Cabanellas, the commander of the 5th Region, to not join the rebellion. Núñez de Prado was arrested and imprisoned at Fort San Cristóbal in Pamplona on 24 July 1936. He disappeared afterwards with no documentation of his fate during his imprisonment. When his wife attempted to obtain a widow's pension, the military concluded that "could have died in the national zone" ("podía haber fallecido en zona nacional"), "must have been tried by a court-martial" ("que debió ser juzgado en algún consejo de guerra"), or "was presumed executed" ("que se le suponía ejecutado").

== Awards and decorations ==
Núñez de Prado received the following awards.

Spain

- Grand Cross of the Order of Civil Merit (19 July 1928)
- Military Medal (12 January 1923)
- Cross of Naval Merit in white (21 January 1928)

Political offices
Preceded by Carlos Tovar de Revilla	Colonial Governor of Spanish Guinea; 1926–1931	Succeeded by José Domínguez Manresa (interim)
