= House of Maroto =

Spanish noble family

Maroto
- Noble family
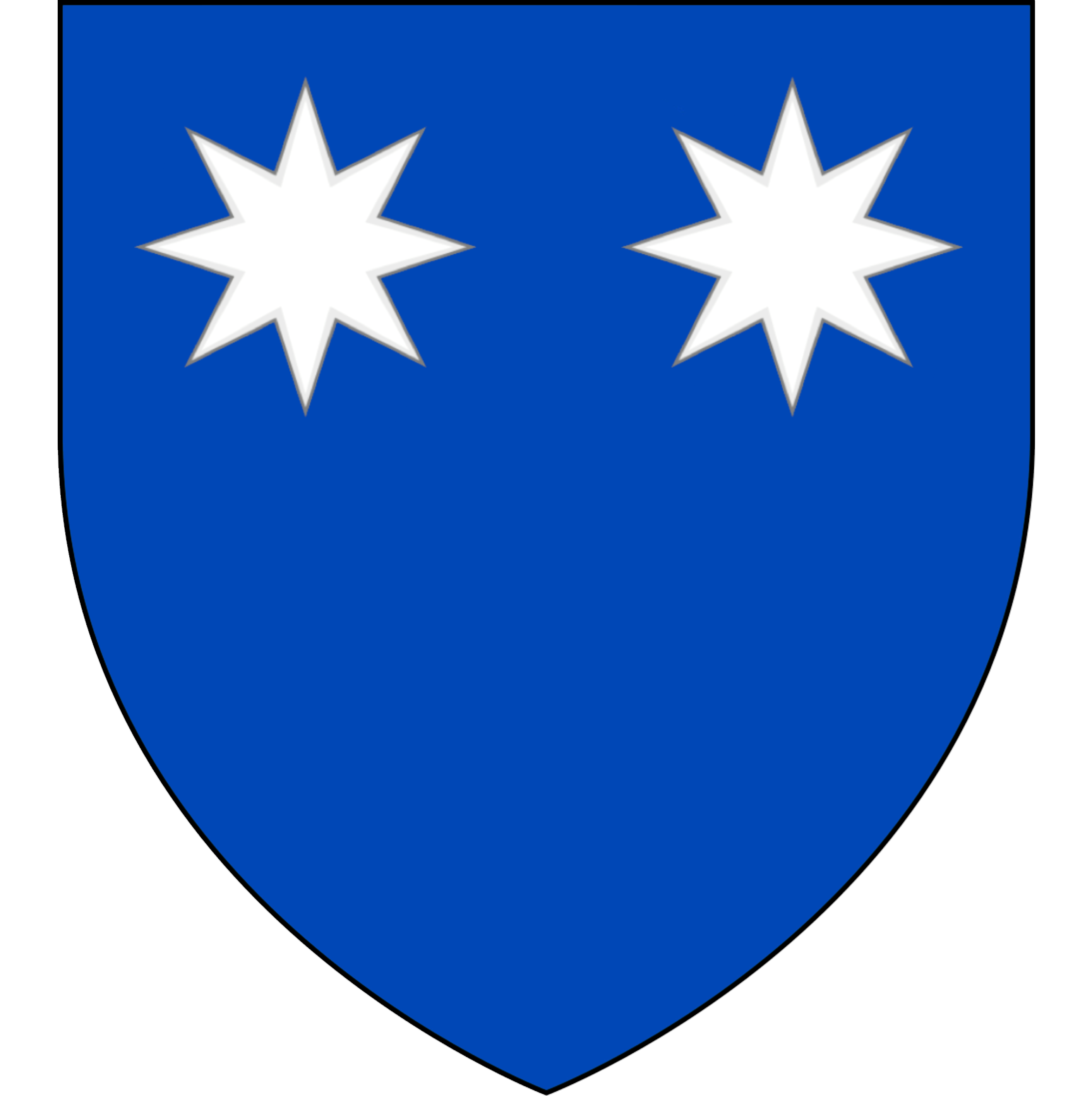
- Country: Kingdom of Spain
- Founded: 16th century
- Titles: Marquis of Salar; Marquis of Pozoblanco; Marquis of Santo Domingo; Marquis of Casa Ferrandell; Count of Belmonte de Tajo; Count of Clavijo; Count of Casa Ponce de León y Maroto; Count of Maseguilla; Count of Casa Maroto; Viscount of Elgueta; Grandee of Spain
- Connected families: House of Ponce de León
- Estates: Casa Maroto; Can Maroto

The House of Maroto (Spanish: Casa de Maroto) is a Spanish aristocratic family. The family gained prominence for its extensive military service, series of successful marriages, and acquisition of several titles.

== History ==
The House of Maroto is an old noble lineage, tracing its origins to an ancestral estate in Andújar (Jaén). Early descendant, Pedro Maroto, was recognized as a hidalgo de sangre in 1587 and served as a councilman of Andújar, as well as Mayor of the Holy Brotherhood in 1597.

Several notable branches of the family descend from Rafael Maroto and Grecia González, who married in Zamora during the 18th century. Among their children include Rafael Maroto y González and Ramón Maroto y González.

Rafael Maroto y González was a military captain who acted as an administrator for the Visitador de Rentas in Lorca. His son, Rafael Maroto Yserns was a Spanish general, known both for his involvement on the Spanish side in the wars of independence in South America and on the Carlist side in the First Carlist War. He was granted the titles Viscount of Elgueta and Count of Casa Maroto by the Carlist King Carlos V.

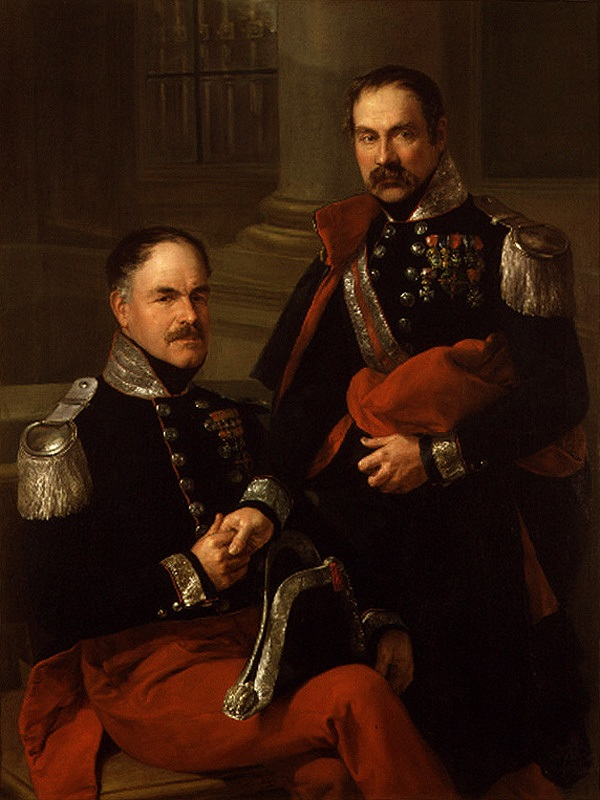
Portrait of Rafael Maroto alongside Baldomero Espartero, Prince of Vergara.

Ramón Maroto y González was a lieutenant of the Spanish regiment and established a branch of the family in Palma de Mallorca. He married María Francisca Villalonga y Ferrandell, 2nd Marchioness of Casa Ferrandell. The Marquisate of Casa Ferrandell was later reinstated in 1917 by King Alfonso XIII in favor of Fernando González Valerio y González Maroto. The title has since remained in the family and is presently held by Natalia Maroto de Mesa, 8th Marchioness of Casa Ferrandell.

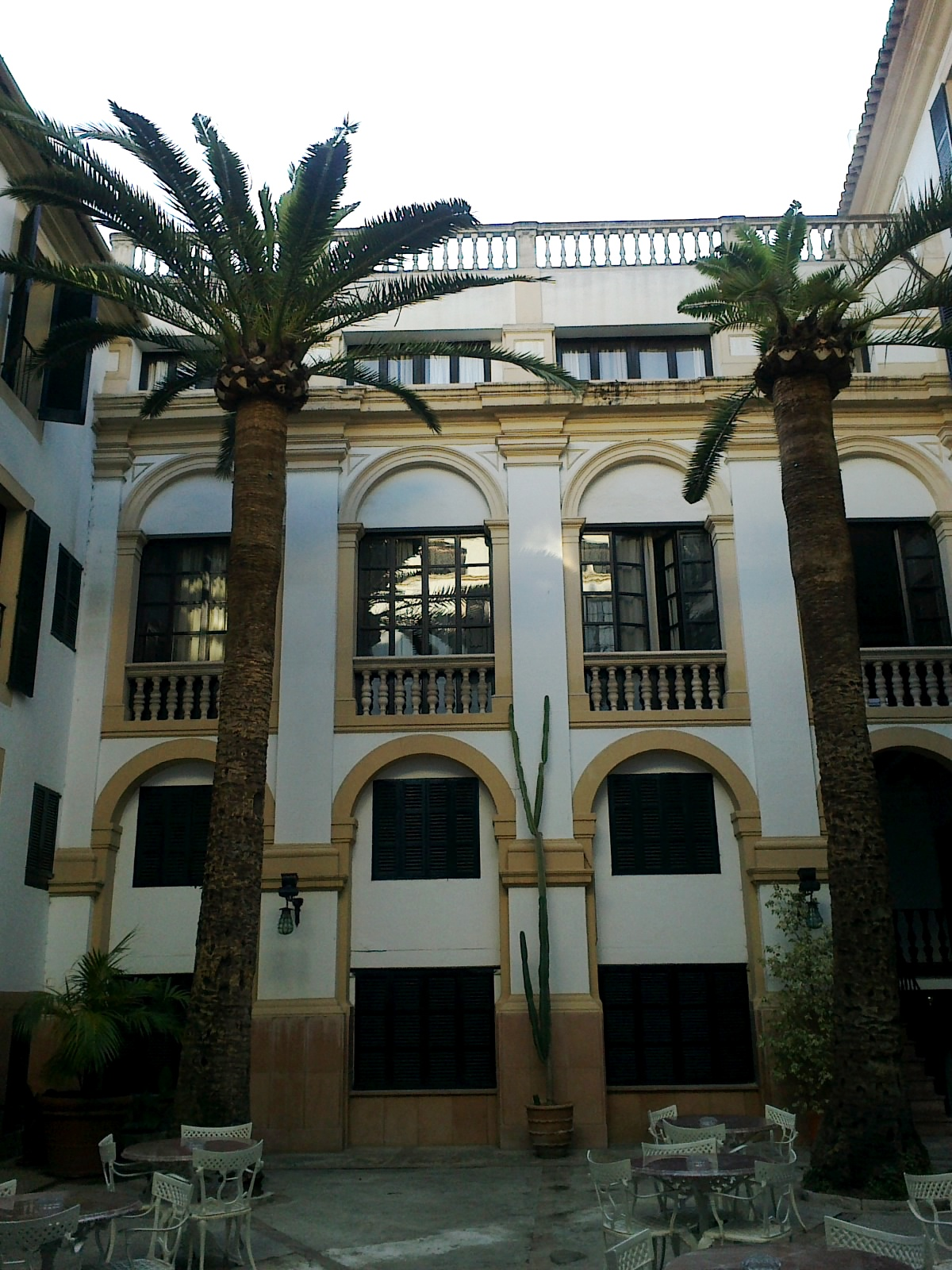
Palace of the Marquis of Casa Ferrandell (Can Maroto) in Palma.

In 1891, King Alfonso XIII granted the Marquisate of Santo Domingo to Juan Maroto y Polo, who married Lorenza Pérez del Pulgar y Fernández de Villavicencio, 8th Marchioness of Pozoblanco. The couple had three children, Francisco Maroto y Pérez del Pulgar, 2nd Marquis of Santo Domingo, Juan Maroto y Pérez del Pulgar, 9th Marquis of Pozoblanco, and María Eulalia Maroto y Pérez del Pulgar.

Juan Maroto y Pérez del Pulgar married Baroness Augustine von Nagel Ittlingen y Canevaro, a descendant of Louise Christine, Countess of Stolberg-Stolberg, daughter of George II of Hesse-Darmstadt and Princess Sophie Eleonore of Saxony, as well as the Italian Dukes of Zoagli and Castelvari. Their daughter, Agustina Maroto y von Nagel, inherited both the Marquisate of Santo Domingo and the Marquisate of Pozoblanco. Agustina also inherited the Marquisate of Salar, Countship of Clavijo, Countship of Belmonte de Tajo, and Countship of Maseguilla from her Aunt, María Teresa Pérez del Pulgar y de Muguiro.

María Eulalia Maroto y Pérez del Pulgar married Ramón Colón de Carvajal y Hurtado de Mendoza, a descendant of Christopher Columbus and the early Dukes of Alba. Their second child, Cristóbal Colón de Carvajal y Maroto, 17th Duke of Veragua, was a prominent Spanish Navy officer and statesman.

During the 19th century, members of the family maintained a presence in the Captaincy General of Cuba. Francisco Ponce de León y Maroto, Count of Casa Ponce de León y Maroto, and Antonio Ponce de León y Maroto, Marquis of Aguas Claras were notable members of this branch.

== Notable members ==
- Ramón Maroto y González, lieutenant of the Spanish regiment.
- Rafael Maroto, Spanish General, Viscount of Elgueta, Count of Casa Maroto, Grand Cross of the Order of Isabella the Catholic, Knight of the Royal and Military Order of Saint Hermenegild.
- Francisco Maroto y Pérez del Pulgar, II Marquis of Santo Domingo, knight of the Royal Collegiate Body of the Nobility of Madrid, and the Royal Brotherhood of Noble Knights of Our Lady of Portillo of Zaragoza.
- Juan Maroto y Pérez del Pulgar, IX Marquis of Pozoblanco, Captain of the Gentilhombres de cámara con ejercicio.
- Juan Francisco Martínez de las Rivas y Maroto, XII Marquis of Salar.
- Agustina Maroto y von Nagel, XII Marchioness of Salar, XI Countess of Clavijo, Countess of Belmonte de Tajo, Marchioness of Pozoblanco, Countess of Maseguilla, III Marchioness of Santo Domingo, and Grandee of Spain.
- Cristóbal Colón de Carvajal y Maroto, 17th Duke of Veragua, 16th Duke of la Vega, Marquess of Aguilafuente, Marquess of Jamaica, 19th Admiral of the Mar Océana, Adelantado of the Indies, twice Grandee of Spain, and knight of the Order of Santiago.
- Juan Maroto y Polo, I Marquis of Santo Domingo, and Mayordomo de semana of King Alfonso XIII.
- Fernando González Valerio y González Maroto, III Marquis of Casa Ferrandell, and Grandee of Spain.
- Ramón Maroto y Moxó, IV Marquis of Casa Ferrandell, and Grandee of Spain.
- Manuel Maroto y Coll, V Marquis of Casa Ferrandell, and Grandee of Spain.
- Maria Victoria Maroto y de Mesa, VI Marchioness of Casa Ferrandell, and Grandee of Spain.
- Ramón Maroto Cotoner, VII Marquis of Casa Ferrandell, and Grandee of Spain.
- Natalia Maroto de Mesa, VIII Marchioness of Casa Ferrandell, and Grandee of Spain.
- Ignacio de Palacio y Maroto, II Marquis of Llano de San Javier, IV Count of Almenas.
- Antonio Ponce de León y Maroto, I Marquis of Aguas Claras.
- Doctor Francisco José de Jesús Cipriano Ponce de León y Maroto, Ortiz y Montaña, I Count of Casa Ponce de León y Maroto.

== See also ==
- List of noble houses
- Spanish nobility
