= Muñagorriren bertsoak =

Set of Basque-language poems

Muñagorriren bertsoak (Basque for 'Muñagorri's bertsos') are a set of written bertsos (extemporaneous poems in Basque) written and published in Gipuzkoa (Basque Country, Spain) in 1838 during the last stage of the First Carlist War. During the war various bertso leaflets were published, promoting various factions, with some enjoying wide circulation and influence over public opinion across Basque language areas, the main Carlist stronghold.

The Muñagorri bertsos were issued by José Antonio Muñagorri's faction with the aim of creating a split within Carlos de Borbón's supporters and putting an end to the war, in exchange for keeping a reduced version of home rule in the Basque Country (peace and fueros). Muñagorri's influence on the ground was small, but his talks with the liberals in Madrid paved the way to the Embrace of Bergara (1839).

== Text ==
While the whole version extends longer, the reduced, most widely known version is made up of six stanzas, and popularized in modern times by singer-songwriter Benito Lertxundi.

Muñagorriren bertsoak*
Original in Basque			English translation
Muñagorrik diona bere proklamian, gerrak ondatzen gaitu bostgarren urtian; igaz jarrikan Carlos; Madrilko bidian, bultza zuten atzera, gerra bere oñian.	Carlos agertu ezkero probintzi auetan, beti bizi gerade neke ta penetan. Naiz kendu guk deguna beinere ezer eman; Bost negar egiteko, nunbait jaio giñan.	Kordoiz inguraturik kostatik Ebrora, trabaz gaude josirik bera eta gora. Atzenikan frantsesak itxi du frontera. Gerrak ez dakar onik Iñundik iñora.	As told by Muñagorri in his statement, war ruins us on its fifth year; last year Carlos was on his way to Madrid, then pushed back, war trod on his heels.	Since Carlos showed up in these provinces, we are always through agony and hardships. Snatches our possessions gives nothing in return; alas we were born for a fair amount of tears.	Chords bind us from the coast to the Ebro, we are being constrained no matter where. Last of all, the French shut down the border. War brings nothing good nothing at all.
Agintari onenak preso daduzkate; euskalduna izatia du bakoitzak kalte. Tejeiro ta Maroto guzien alkate: Zer gizon oyetatik espera gentzake.	Semiak soldadu ta preso gurasuak, ezin pagaturikan kontribuzyuak. Trintxera lanetara gainiera auzuak. Dolorezkoak dira gaur gure pausuak.	Atiak itxi eta ogia garesti; artua ari da igotzen poliki; dirua ezkutatzen da egunero emendik. Nola bizi garen bada, arritutzen naiz ni.	The best rulers are detained; being a Basque is in one's detriment. Tejeiro and Maroto are chiefs of us all: What can we ever expect from them.	Our sons drafted our parents detained, tributes any more can not be paid. Not least, our neighbours are in the trenches. Our steps are today laden with sorrow.	Doors are closed bread is expensive; while (the price of) corn goes up steadily; money is being hidden every day here around. Still in wonder how we manage to live through.

*Top to bottom, left to right
