= Marquess of Jamaica =

Spanish nobility title

- Creation date: 19 January 1537
- Created by: Charles I of Spain
- Peerage: Spanish nobility
- First holder: Luis Colón, 1st Duke of Veragua
- Present holder: Cristóbal Colón de Carvajal, 18th Duke of Veragua
- Heir apparent: Cristóbal Colón de Carvajal y de Mandalúniz
- Status: Extant

Marquess of Jamaica (Spanish: Marqués de la Jamaica) is a hereditary title in the Spanish nobility, created in 1537 by King Charles I in favor of Luis Colón y Toledo, grandson of explorer Christopher Columbus, along with the title of Duke of Veragua. At the time, it was also a jurisdictional manor.

== History ==
When Luis Colón's father died in 1526, he inherited all of the family's rights to vast parts of the Viceroyalty of the Indies that his grandfather founded. His mother, to protect her son's rights, sued the Crown, and after years of legal battles, the two parties reached an agreement.

In exchange for renouncing most of their rights, the Crown created two jurisdictional manors for the Columbus family: the Duchy of Veragua (present-day Nicaragua, Costa Rica, and Panama) and the Marquissate of Jamaica (encompassing the entire island of Jamaica). Years later, the Duke renounced his American manors —although he retained the titles—, which he ceded to the Crown in exchange for an annual income that the State paid to his descendants until 1898.

=== Legal battle ===
After the death in 1787 of Carlos Bernardo Fitz-James Stuart y Silva, 11th Duke of Veragua and Marquess of Jamaica, from the House of FitzJames (or Berwick), Mariano Colón de Larreátegui y Jiménez de Embún, a descendant of one of Luis Colón's brothers, claimed the Colón family titles for himself, considering that he had a better right than the latter's descendants. The courts ruled in his favor, obtaining favorable rulings in 1790 and 1793, and he was confirmed as the 12th Duke of Veragua (GE), 12th Duke of La Vega (GE), 12th Marquess of Jamaica and 14th Admiral and Adelantado of the Indies by Royal Order of 9 January 1796.

== Marquesses of Jamaica ==
No.	Name	Term	Claim
1	Luis Colón y Toledo	1537–1572	Grantee
2	Felipa Colón de Toledo y Mosquera	1572–1577	Daughter of the previous
3	Cristóbal Colón de Toledo y Cardona	1577–1583	Cousin of the previous
4	Nuño Colón de Portugal	1583–1622	Second nephew of the previous
5	Álvaro Jacinto Colón de Portugal y Espinosa	1622–1636	Son of the previous
6	Pedro Nuño Colón de Portugal	1636–1673	Son of the previous
7	Pedro Manuel Colón de Portugal	1673–1710	Son of the previous
8	Pedro Nuño Colón de Portugal y Ayala Toledo	1710–1712	Son of the previous
9	Catalina Ventura Colón de Portugal y Ayala Toledo	1712–1739	Sister of the previous
10	Jacobo Fitz-James Stuart y Colón de Portugal	1739–1785	Son of the previous
11	Carlos Bernardo Fitz-James Stuart y Silva	1785–1787	Son of the previous
12	Mariano Colón de Larreátegui y Jiménez de Embún	1796–1821	Legal claim; direct descendant of one of the first duke's siblings
13	Pedro María Colón y Ramírez de Baquedano	1821–1866	Son of the previous
14	Cristóbal Colón de la Cerda	1868–1910	Son of the previous
15	Cristóbal Colón y Aguilera	1911–1936	Son of the previous
16	Ramón Colón de Carvajal y Hurtado de Mendoza	1936–1941	Nephew of the previous
17	Cristóbal Colón de Carvajal y Maroto	1942–1974	Son of the previous
18	Cristóbal Colón de Carvajal y Gorosábel	1974–pres.	Son of the previous
