= Mariano Alonso Alonso =

Spanish military officer

- Born: Mariano Alonso Alonso; 11 October 1899; Madrid, Spain
- Died: 3 July 1974 (aged 74); Madrid, Spain
- Military career
- Allegiance: Nationalist Spain
- Branch: Spanish Army
- Service years: 1917–1965
- Rank: Lieutenant general
- Commands: Balearic Islands; V Military Region; I Military Region
- Conflicts: Rif War; Spanish Civil War
- Other work: Governor of Spanish Guinea (1942–1944); Governor of Spanish Sahara (1958–1961)

Mariano Alonso Alonso (Madrid, 11 October 1899 – 3 July 1974) was a Spanish military officer and colonial administrator, governor of Spanish Guinea and Spanish Sahara, and Captain General of the Balearic Islands during the Francoist regime.

== Biography ==
In 1914 Alonso entered the Toledo Infantry Academy, from which he graduated in 1917 with the rank of lieutenant. In November 1920 he was assigned to the indigenous police of the Spanish protectorate in Morocco, until 1924 when he was promoted to captain. During these years he learned Arabic. Between 1930 and 1934 he studied at the Escuela de Estado Mayor, and after graduation he was assigned to the Inspectorate of the Khalifian Forces.

The Spanish coup of July 1936 caught Alonso in Tétouan, and from there he left for Ifni, joining the Nationalist faction in the Spanish Civil War. In May 1937 he was promoted to commander, and in July 1937 he was promoted to lieutenant colonel. He took an active part in the Battle of Brunete and at the end of the Civil War was appointed Delegate of Indigenous Affairs until January 1942, when he was appointed Governor of Spanish Guinea, serving in Santa Isabel until 1944. Promoted to colonel, he was a professor at the General Military Academy and at the Escuela Politécnica Superior del Ejército. In September 1952 he was promoted to brigadier general and in November 1956 to major general. In July 1958 he was appointed Governor of Spanish Sahara; he left the position in El Aaiún in October 1961, when he was promoted to lieutenant general and appointed Captain General of the Balearic Islands. He left office in January 1963 and replaced Manuel Baturone Colombo as Captain General of the V Military Region (Aragon). In October 1964 he replaced Rafael García Valiño as Captain General of the I Military Region (Madrid) and held the post until he moved to the reserve in October 1965. Since then he has been a councilor at the Spanish Council of State, representing the Spanish Army.
