= Rafael Maroto =

Spanish general

Rafael Maroto Count of Casa Maroto
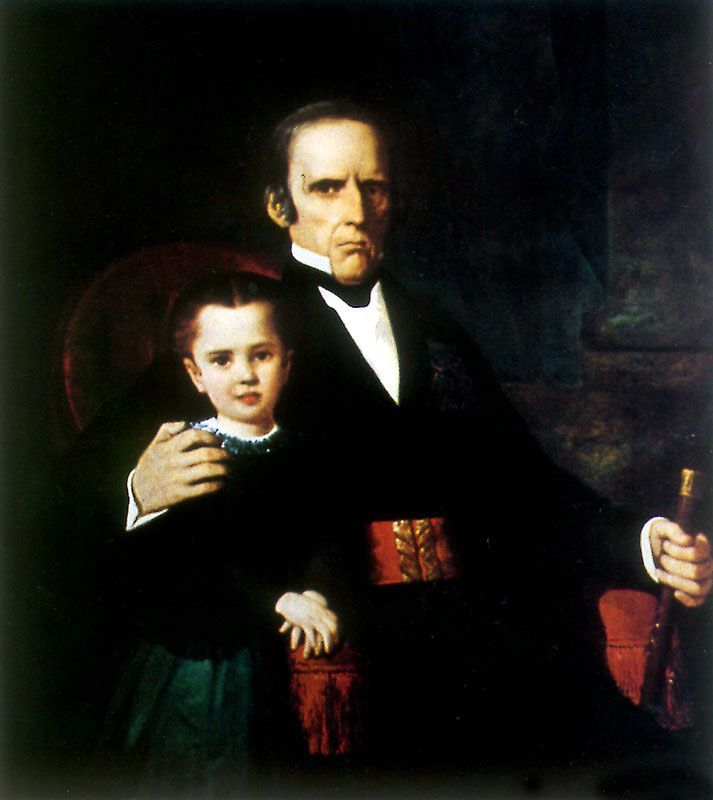
- Rafael Maroto with his niece Margarita Borgoño, painting by Raymond Monvoisin
- Born: October 15, 1783; Lorca, Spain
- Died: August 25, 1853 (aged 69); Valparaíso, Chile
- Family: Maroto

Signature
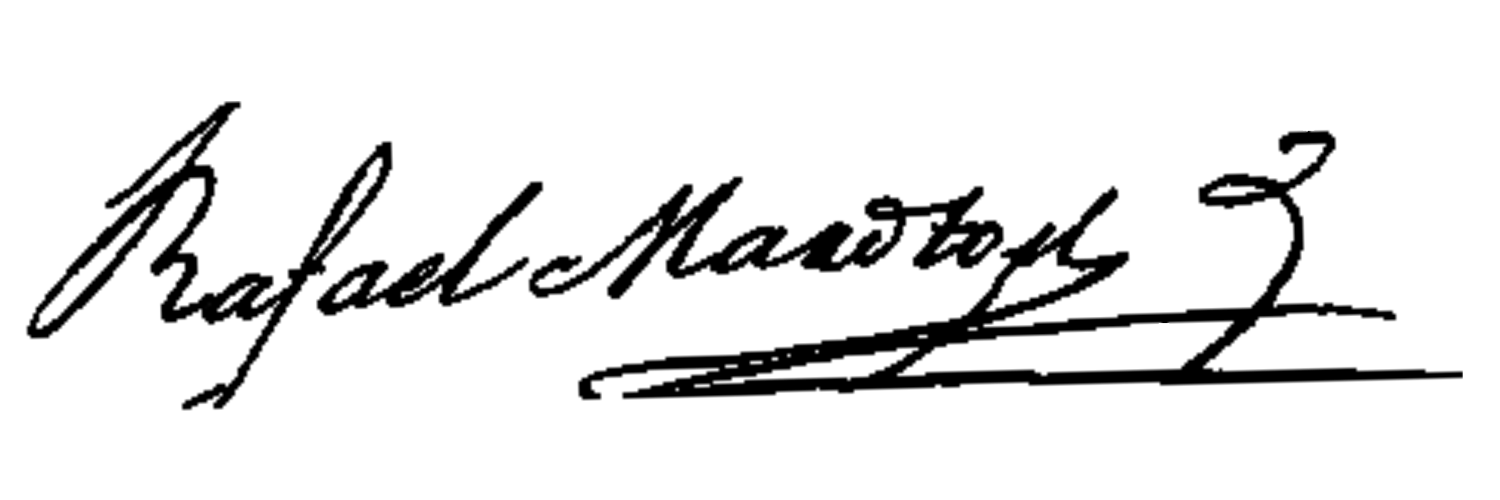

Rafael Maroto Yserns (October 15, 1783 – August 25, 1853) was a Spanish general, known both for his involvement on the Spanish side in the wars of independence in South America and on the Carlist side in the First Carlist War.

== Childhood and early life ==
Maroto was born in the city of Lorca in the Region of Murcia, Spain, to Margarita Isern, a native of Barcelona, and Rafael Maroto, a native of Zamora. His father was a military captain who held several important positions in civilian life, such as acting as an administrator for the Visitador de Rentas in Lorca.

Maroto was baptized in the San Cristóbal parish church, where his baptismal certificate was preserved and later helped biographers clarify details of his family. During his childhood, he lived on the Calle Mayor (Main street) of the Barrio de San Cristóbal, across from Plaza de la Estrella. He married Antonia Cortés García, a Chilean, in 1816, and had seven children with her. Antonia and two of his daughters died in a shipwreck in 1830 en route to Chile.

At the age of 18, Maroto took part in the conflicts and campaigns of Manuel de Godoy, which were collectively known as the War of the Oranges. He also fought in the Spanish War of Independence, in which he was wounded and made a prisoner in Zaragoza. He then received a position in Peru and later fought in the war against the pro-independence Chileans. However, he was defeated by General José de San Martín in the Battle of Chacabuco (1817). In Spain, he also participated in the First Carlist War and was one of the signers, along with liberal general Baldomero Espartero, of the Convention of Vergara (Convenio de Vergara, also called the Abrazo de Vergara: "embrace of Vergara"), which ended the civil war between Carlists and the Isabelinos with the victory of the latter.

== Military career ==
At the age of 11, Maroto left for Cartagena in the province of Murcia where he joined as a minor subordinate cadet in the Asturias Infantry Regiment in 1794. He was promoted to second lieutenant on June 15, 1798.

=== Portugal and Ferrol ===
In 1800, he was sent by his superiors to Ferrol, Spain. On 25 August, British forces landed on the beach near A Graña and launched the unsuccessful Ferrol Expedition as part of the War of the Second Coalition. Maroto participated in the repulse of the expedition, for which he was awarded a Shield of Honor. In mid-1801, he served in the War of the Oranges, a successful Franco-Spanish invasion of Portugal. Moroto continued to be stationed for Ferrol for two years before returning to the Asturias Regiment. On 15 October 1806, he was promoted to the rank of lieutenant.

=== Spanish War of Independence ===
Maroto also fought as a soldier in the Spanish War of Independence against Napoleon's army. The French attacked the plaza of Valencia on June 28, 1808. Maroto defended the city with the batteries that he had at his position, in Santa Catalina and Torres de Cuarte (this was the name that was given to it at the time). Forced to surrender to the enemy after a heroic defense, he was recognized with distinction to the mother country and was awarded a Shield of Honor.

On November 23 he took part in the Battle of Tudela in Navarre. On December 24, Monte Torrero and Casa Blanca—suburbs of Zaragoza—were attacked, and shortly after Maroto used bayonets in order to dislodge the enemy that had taken them.

With the grade of captain (promoted September 8), Maroto participated also in the Siege of Zaragoza in 1809. He gained control of Pilar, the batteries of San José, Puerta Quemada and Tenerías. He made forays from these batteries, often receiving gunfire. When the city of Zaragoza was captured, Maroto was made a prisoner of war by the French, but managed to escape. For his heroic acts in Zaragoza he received a Shield of Distinction that held the motto "Recompensa del valor y patriotismo" ("Reward for Valor and Patriotism"). He was declared a "benemérito de la patria en grado heroico y eminente", roughly "Distinction of the Fatherland, in Heroic and Distinguished Degree". On March 9 he was promoted to lieutenant colonel.

In 1811 he was assigned to the Infantry Regiment of the line in Valencia. On October 24 and 25, he occupied the defense of the attacks against Puzol, Heights of Sagunto Castle, and Murviedro. On October 25, 1812, he defended the lines of Grao, Monte Olivet, Cuarte, the line of Valencia, and the square of the city. When this plaza was captured, he was made a prisoner, along with his regiment, and once again, he seized the opportunity to escape. After these events, he was assigned control of the General Depot of troops destined overseas.

=== In the Americas ===
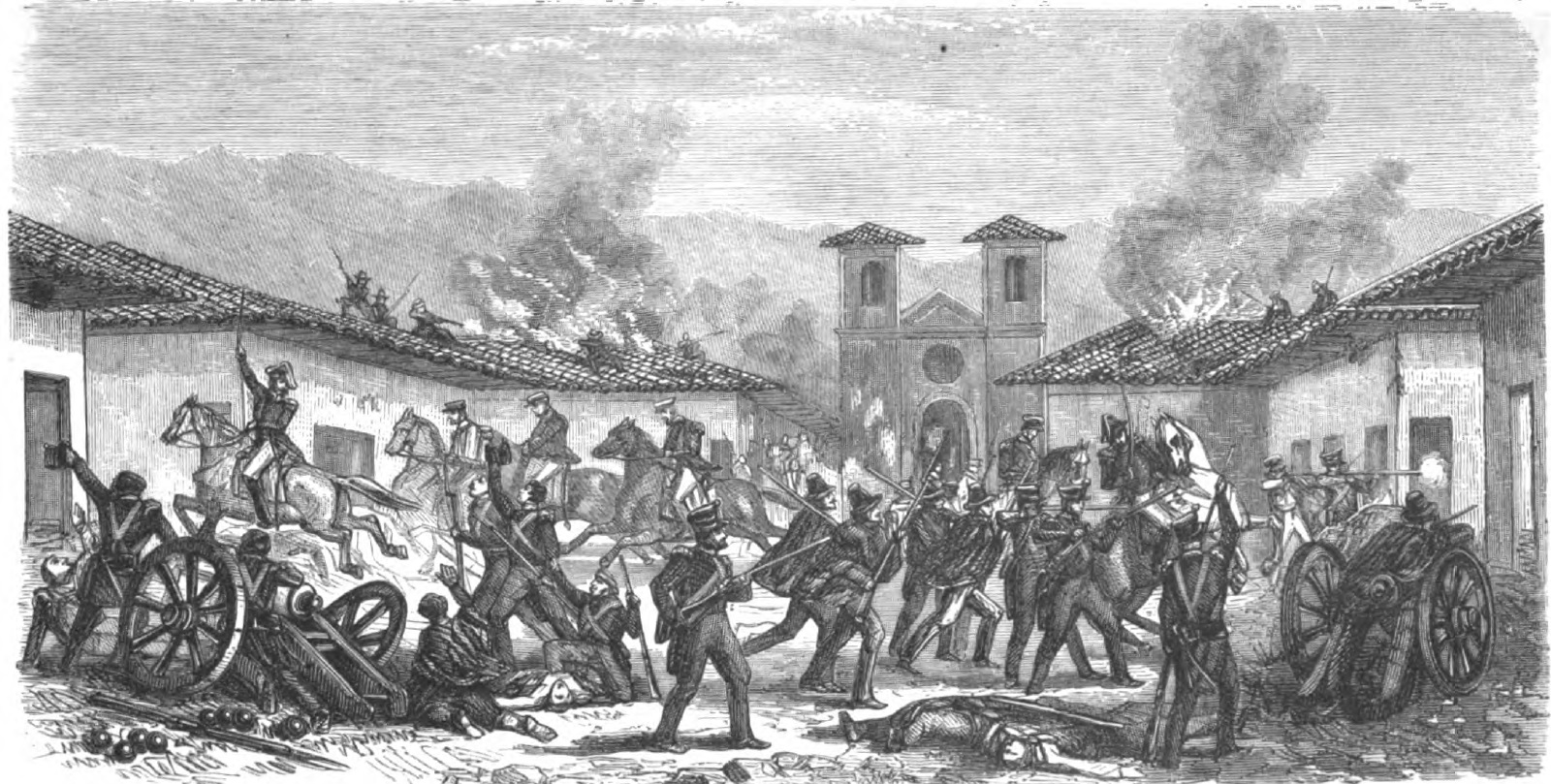
The Battle of Rancagua in which Maroto participated in the taking of the plaza.

On November 16, 1813, he was named colonel in charge of the Queen's Talavera Regiment. At the head of this unit, he set sail for Peru on December 25, 1813. On April 24, 1814 they disembarked at Callao to aid the Viceroy José Fernando de Abascal y Sousa, who had been working arduously to maintain his viceroyalty and the bordering territories under Spanish control. Maroto and his troops, placed under the orders of Brigadier Mariano Osorio, were sent to Chile, which, during the Napoleonic Wars, had risen in rebellion. They embarked July 19, 1814, arriving at the naval base of Talcahuano, the nucleus of royalist activity, August 13. Osorio succeeded in organizing, along with local elements, a mobile army of some five thousand men, of whom Maroto's troops were practically the only Spaniards.

On October 1, the insurgents started to battle in Rancagua in an attempt to prevent the expeditionaries from taking Santiago. Maroto, manifesting a disdain for his opponents typical of officials recently arrived in the Americas, ordered his troops to attack the enemy fortifications without bothering to send in either scouts or guerrillas. The result was that Maroto's Talaveras, bombarded by the volley of shots, were forced to retreat with heavy losses. On the next day, Bernardo O'Higgins managed to make his way past the royal troops and retreat to the capital, where his opponents entered without resistance a few days later. Whether due to a belief that Maroto had conducted himself clumsily in battle or due to other, unknown reasons, although the list of officials who ought to be promoted after the latest victories sent by Osorio to viceroy Abascal included Maroto's name, the messenger who delivered the list nonetheless had confidential instructions to let Abascal know that Osorio believed that Maroto should not be promoted. When Maroto received word several months later that the list that had been sent to Madrid did not include his name, he lodged the appropriate complaint with Abascal, who had not liked the confusing way of proceeding and ended up finding in Maroto's favor on May 10, 1815, granting him the grade of brigadier, backdated to 8 November 1814.

During his stay in Santiago, Maroto entered into a relationship with Antonia Cortés, who belonged to a noble and wealthy family of the local oligarchy; they married at the end of March 1815, just before he left Santiago, a place which he apparently did not find particularly to his taste. Immediately after, leading two companies, Maroto headed to Arica to aid in the campaign of Joaquín de la Pezuela in Upper Peru, now Bolivia. On July 15 he joined his troops, but he did not remain with them long because, for unknown reasons, Pezuela sued him and sent him to Lima. The trial was interrupted through the mediation of Abascal, who convinced Pezuela that it wasn't worth the trouble to continue. After spending some time in Lima, Maroto returned to Chile, whose command had fallen back into the hands of Field Marshal Casimiro Marcó del Pont, with whom he soon fell in disfavor.

At the beginning of February 1817 the troops of José de San Martín crossed the Andes to put an end to Spanish dominion in Chile. In the face of the disintegration of the royalist forces, Maroto proposed abandoning the capital and retreating southward, where they could hold out and obtain resources for a new campaign. The military conference called by Marcó on February 8 adopted Maroto's strategy, but the following morning the captain changed his mind and ordered Maroto to prepare for battle in Chacabuco. The night before the combat, Antonio de Quintanilla, who would later distinguish himself extraordinarily in the defense of Chiloé Archipelago, confided with another official regarding the ill-chosen strategy and that, given the position of the insurgents, the royalist forces ought to retreat a few leagues towards the hills of Colina: "Maroto overheard this conversation from a nearby chamber and either couldn't or refused to hear me because of his pride and self-importance, called on an attendant with his notorious hoarse voice and proclaimed a general decree on pain of death, to whoever suggested a retreat." Although Maroto and his troops fought with valor, the battle turned into a complete defeat. Maroto, who succeeded in escaping thanks to the speed of his horse, was slightly injured during the retreat.

After another military conference in Santiago, Maroto, his wife, and most of the troops left for Valparaíso, from where they sailed to Peru. Pezuela, now the new viceroy, who still didn't much care for Maroto, considered nonetheless that "if perhaps he was not so skillful a commander in the unfortunate battle of Chacabuco, at the very least he performed with the valour and serenity expected of a Spaniard and an honourable officer," for which he received due consideration. Maroto was then sent to Cuzco at the head of two companies from Talavera which had remained in Peru, with instructions to organize a new battalion. Unhappy with everything and everybody, on February 22, 1818 he was appointed President and Head of Government of the City and Province of Charcas, in Upper Peru, a village far removed from war, where he performed a notable administrative labor. After the 1820 Revolution in Spain, and once having received appropriate stipulation, Maroto proclaimed the Constitution in Charcas October 23, 1820. Four of his children were born and baptized in Charcas: Manuel María Rafael, María del Carmen Agustina, Margarita Antonia, and Justa María Mercedes Rufina. Rafael Abdón Ignacio, Víctor, Cándida, and Faustino were born later, the last the child of a maidservant with whom he had a relationship during his stay in Asturias, and whom he did not initially acknowledge, but to whom he had to grant a pension following the accusation formulated by his mother.

The garrison of Potosí rebelled January 1, 1821 and Maroto marched against them, defeating the insurgents and taking the city. Nonetheless, on the arrival of General Pedro Antonio Olañeta, who as deputy of the viceroy exercised his authority throughout Upper Peru, he was ordered to return to Charcas. After a heated argument, Maroto complied with the orders he'd received. The disagreements between the two were further amplified when, during the brief invasion of Upper Peru by Andrés de Santa Cruz, Maroto refused to comply with the orders of Olañeta, who protested hotly against him to viceroy José de la Serna, stating, among other things, that "ever since this man set foot in America, he has done nothing but foment insubordination and express ill against the authorities." The viceroy, who did not have excessive confidence in Olañeta, opted to promote both to the rank of field marshal, despite the fact that Olañeta had played only a limited role in the campaign, and Maroto none at all.

The disagreements between Maroto and Olañeta culminated in 1824, when Olañeta, who had proposed to reestablish the absolutist regime in Peru, as it had now been established in Spain, marched with his troops against him, obligating them to abandon their positions. Despite the viceroy's intentions in favor of dialogue, the matter degenerated into a civil war that weakened the royalist troops and permitted the loss of Peru. Maroto was next named by La Serna as chief of one of the three divisions that, under the orders of General José de Canterac had to face the invasion by Antonio José de Sucre. After the Battle of Junín, Maroto maintained strong disagreements with Canterac and ended up resigning, since he considered that the withdrawal of the Royalist forces was being carried out in an inadequate way. Named governor of Puno, he was there taken by surprise by the capitulation of Ayacucho, in which Puno was included. Accompanied by La Serna and others officials, Maroto and his family embarked on the French frigate Hernestine, which arrived in Burdeos in the middle of 1825.

=== Again in Spain ===
After his return from America on 1 July 1825, Maroto was entrusted with the command of the army of Castilla la Vieja, stationed in Valladolid, site of the general headquarters. On 1 September of that year, the field marshal placed him in command of reestablishing order with force of arms, and among the royal volunteers of the Principality of Asturias. Later, on 11 July 1828, he was employed by royal order in the barracks at Pamplona. On 21 June 1829, the king granted him quarters in the Army of New Castile stationed in Madrid. On 15 March 1832 he was named commanding general of the province of Toledo. He renounced that post on 31 October, as the story goes, because he was forced by Count Ignacio de Negri to support an insurrection by his troops, and he felt that before acting against the government he ought to break all ties with it. For this same reason he refused the charge, conferred upon him on 5 January 1833, of second-in-command and general commander of the Basque Provinces.

== The Carlist cause ==
Maroto himself relates in the "Manifiesto razonado de las causas del convenio de Vergara" ("Reasoned manifesto of the causes of the Convention of Vergara") how and why he joined the Carlist cause. Since his social and professional position—as well as his future prospects—were of great fortune, he insists that he did not join to get rich or to prosper. He asserts that he decided to follow the pretender to the crown, the Infante Carlos, Count of Molina, brother of king Ferdinand VII's and uncle to the future queen Isabella II because he thought it was the best for Spain, thinking that the possible rule of Don Carlos was better than that of a 3-year-old girl, whose minority would bring forward an unclear regency. Maroto at the time had more faith in Don Carlos, in whom he saw qualities of religious principles, an orderly and economic system at his own home, and an observance of the law. He also confesses that by following an exiled prince, he was almost certain of failure and that the few victories they might achieve would be bleak, inch by inch, without large, spectacular advances, and that in addition they would not be treated as authentic soldiers but as bandits and traitors.

=== Initial stages ===
Maroto was in Toledo as commanding general of that province when he was visited by Ignacio de Negri y Mendizábal, Count of Negri, one of the principal Carlist conspirators of 1833. After their conversation, Maroto spent some time considering the revolutionary cause and finally decided, with great calm and certainty, to join it. He was asked if, given his position and standing at the head of a garrison, he could carry out a military coup, which would have given great support to the cause. Rafael Maroto was a proper and loyal man, and this proposal did not seem ethical to him. He did not want his enlistment in the Carlist ranks to start with a betrayal of the flag to which he had sworn allegiance, or with a flight. He decided to follow a legal path, and started by resigning his command and position within the comandancia general. Once he had broken this link, nothing was in the way of his going over to the other side.

He went to Madrid, where Negri gave him instructions, and where the Carlist party was formally organizing. The first meetings of the revolutionary committees took place there. King Ferdinand VII was already gravely ill and near death. Maroto then proposed to Don Carlos that they proclaim him regent during his brother's illness, but the Infante opposed the idea, "and those who suggested it were not considered loyal servants, because they did not wear habits or cassocks, because they claimed that in earthly matters it was necessary to do something in order that heaven would give help". The government found out about the conspiracy and many of those involved were jailed. Maroto not only survived these first persecutions, but also was named second in command of the Basque Provinces, a command that he resigned immediately. This action was not well received by the government, which found out about the general's new ideas thanks to the investigations carried out after the rebellion of Colonel Campos y España, and brought about his arrest on that very spot, in the ministry where he had just presented his resignation, in person and with great formality.

=== Imprisonments and escapes ===
He was taken to prison, where he remained for eight months, throughout which he was gravely ill; he lost nearly all of his eyesight and his hair fell out. After this first imprisonment, Maroto was exiled to Seville and from there was able to obtain a transfer to Granada, where he reunited with his family and decided to rededicate his life to their care. After a time, he was secretly informed that he would be newly imprisoned and moved to a cell in Ceuta. Maroto rapidly prepared his escape, disguised, helped physically and economically by friends and accompanied and guided on the voyage by some smugglers.

From Granada he headed for Madrid, then to Extremadura, then headed to Valencia, where he chartered a boat that was to bring him to Gibraltar but ended up in Algeciras. Finally, he arrived in Gibraltar, and from there managed in a few days to head for Portugal where he met Don Carlos, who was accompanied by a small and varied entourage. With the Infante were other generals, soldiers of other ranks, clergy and various other people. One of the individuals that had the most influence in Don Carlos's decisions was the bishop of León Joaquín Abarca, named Minister of War, advisor, and court favorite. Historians affirm that the bishop had neither military knowledge nor ability and that he was nothing more than a capable courtier with the talent of pleasing a prince.

In Portugal, Maroto demonstrated to Don Carlos his skills as an expert soldier and as a loyal man without courtly ambitions. There, Maroto was involved in the first military encounters with the royal troops devoted to the Isabeline cause, saving Don Carlos and his followers from ambushes and useless battles (where, aimless and doubtful, they wasted crucial moments) and organizing the constant escapes necessitated by how badly they were carrying out his military plans. After the Carlist military failures in Portugal, and helped by the British commissioner Colonel Wylde, who had been sent by the English Crown as an observer and witness, the Pretender, his retinue and some soldiers—among them Maroto—embarked from the port of Lisbon on board the vessel Donegal, which brought them to England.

=== Arrival in the Carlist ranks ===
Maroto left England a few days after Don Carlos's retinue had done the same, but to his surprise he was detained and arrested in Calais and from there was brought to Paris, where he was imprisoned in contradiction of all human rights; the arrest was not justified by any crime or lack of documentation. When he was freed a short time later he asked for a passport so he could leave for Italy, although he stopped for some time in Nice to regain his health and to plan a way to enter Spain instead of going to Italy. He was able effortlessly to go through southern France and arrive at Bordeaux. From there he went to Navarre, aided and protected by French Carlists.

Upon arriving in Carlist-controlled territory, Maroto was well received by the Pretender, who seated him on numerous occasions at his table and tried to give him a responsible command, which he was unable to accomplish because of the opposition of General Tomás de Zumalacárregui, who always had a negative view of Maroto. When Zumalacárregui was injured in Bilbao, Maroto received a direct order from Don Carlos to replace him and took command of his army. However, the written order, manipulated, was confusing and almost contradictory: Don Carlos ordered that Maroto remain in the army, but under the orders of field marshal Francisco Benito Eraso, until, for reasons of health, the latter retired from the Army of the North. He was told to remain patient and in the meantime to obverse the actions of said general, which could be suspicious. Maroto's serious, authentically soldierly character won him at this time the friendship and confidence of the members of the forces, especially the common soldiers.

He confronted the Isabeline general Baldomero Espartero for the first time in the Siege of Bilbao; the citizens of Bilbao had decided to surrender to the Carlists if Espartero's troops weren't able to offer aid. Both armies besieged the city for several days. It was then that Carlist general Vicente González Moreno arrived, who had been named upon the death of Zumalacárregui (25 June 1835) to the command of the Army of the North, a command that had been promised to Maroto (who before the start of the war was the only field marshal, and Moreno a lieutenant general). General Moreno was not a good strategist and soon showed his antagonism against Maroto, which led to a series of actions that were quite unfortunate from a military point of view. This general's orders in the confrontation with Espartero resulted in the supremacy of the Isabeline forces who entered the plaza of Bilbao with only token opposition.

=== General of the Army of Biscay ===
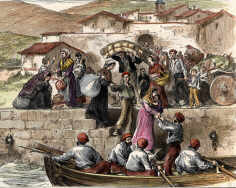
Women fleeing in Guetaria from the Siege of Bilbao

After some months of military inaction, in which it was necessary to follow the entourage of Don Carlos in the manner of a courtier, Maroto was named commanding general of the forces of the Lordship of Biscay; the position had been vacated because of the imprisonment of José María de Orbe y Elío, marquis of Valdespina and Zabala. Once at the head of his army, he considered the best way to effect good military organization and discipline. He obtained great help from the delegation of the Lordship and from the men of the battalions. With the army on point, he marched over the plaza of Bilbao, took the Estuary of Bilbao, cut communications and obstructed all the exits, all without using artillery, which he lacked completely. He gained considerable advantage in skirmishes against the British forces who had disembarked to support the cause of Queen Isabella. General Maroto continued defending his encampment around Bilbao as well as he could while pleading for artillery and reinforcements that never arrived. In the event, his forces were diminished rather than reinforced: two battalions were separated from his command and sent to the lines at San Sebastián.

At this point, Espartero arrived with a large army. The confrontation was on the heights of Arrigorriaga, which the Carlist army domininated, forcing Espartero's forces to retreat to Bilbao in a precipitous and disorderly fashion.

Control of Bilbao was very important, but the lack of united action by the Carlist forces made it impossible to take the town by conventional military means. The internecine rivalries and the lack of military sense among most of the commanding officers made it infeasible to carry out Maroto's proposed strategy. A few days later, he was ordered to transfer control to Brigadier Sarasa and to await orders for a new destination. The war continued, and the Carlists could not carry out a successful campaign due to the schemes and disagreements of their own leaders and generals.

=== Maroto heads the forces of Catalonia ===
Maroto's new destiny was in the forces of Catalonia, which was probably a consequence of his maneuvers against Lieutenant General Nazario Eguía, who had replaced González Moreno at the head of the Army of the North. The voyage to Catalonia was arduous. From Bayonne he arrived in Marseille; from there he crossed the Pyrenees on foot, surviving wind, rain, and vendavales (strong storms from the southeast), accompanied by two men who served him as guides.

Upon arriving in the principality, Maroto took charge of an army of less than 11,000 men, whose instruction, if one may call it that, left much to be desired. On September 7, Maroto began the siege of Prats de Lluçanès, which he was forced to abandon owing to the defeat of the forces that tried to prevent the arrival of a column of assistance. He did not allow himself to be discouraged by this and dedicated the following days to instructing the battalions under his orders, "and established in them such rigorous discipline in eight days… that one would not have seen better in the vanguard division formed later by the Count of Spain'". However, on October 4 his second in command, the Baron of Ortafá was defeated and he died in San Quirico in an action whose result was attributed by the Catalans to his not having been assisted in a timely manner by Maroto.

But the reason for Maroto's leaving Catalonia was not the opposition of the leading Catalans, but his belief that he had been betrayed in not having received the resources he had counted on when he left Navarre. So, after submitting to the Intendant Díaz de Labandero a series of petitions for armaments and uniforms that were totally impossible to fulfill, Maroto abandoned Catalonia 5 October on the pretext of going to see Don Carlos to notify him of the true situation of the war in that territory, thereby fulfilling "my intent of resigning the command of the Catalan forces… it not being my character to carry on a disastrous life with no higher dignity than that of a captain of brigands". It should come as no surprise that the Catalans despised the man who had abandoned them, and that the court of Don Carlos did not look favorably on a man who appeared not to have exerted all possible force to achieve his assigned task.

In his return trip he found himself entangled in new adventures in France where he was incarcerated in Perpignan and Tours, until he could escape with the help of his field assistant José Burdeos and some legitimists.

=== The defense of Estella ===
Don Carlos called him again to organize the troops of the army and Maroto consented. He put the battalions in order, expanding their ranks with dispersed soldiers. He reestablished discipline and ordered them to construct trenches and works of fortification that covered the city of Estella, giving strict orders to collect all types of foodstuffs. Thus began a campaign to boost public morale.

He planned the defence of Estella and its surrounding area, ordering the evacuation of villages on the path which Maroto believed Espartero's army would follow, as it was public knowledge that the latter had decided to besiege the town. Maroto managed to achieve the general's retreat, subsequently improving the mood and hopes of his people as a result.

Maroto's idea was to maintain the entire Basque Provinces (Provincias Vascongadas, as they were known in that era) as a base of support and the residence of the future court of Don Carlos until the gates of Madrid were opened. In order to do this, he tried to put himself in contact with General Ramón Cabrera to establish a line of operations through Alto Aragón. Maroto formed five battalions, increased the cavalry by contracting with foreign horsemen and for some time led skirmishes, defenses and attacks against the royalist troops for the Navarrese lands.

New conspiracies, denunciations and disagreements accumulated into a conspiracy to assassinate Maroto, but without success. His greatest enemy in this period was the Carlist José Arias Teijeiro, named by the Pretender as undersecretary of justice. He signed many death sentences against the principal generals, accusing them of sedition. It was said pejoratively of these generals that they were "de carta y compás" ("of the square and compass"), that is, Freemasons.

=== Executions of Estella ===
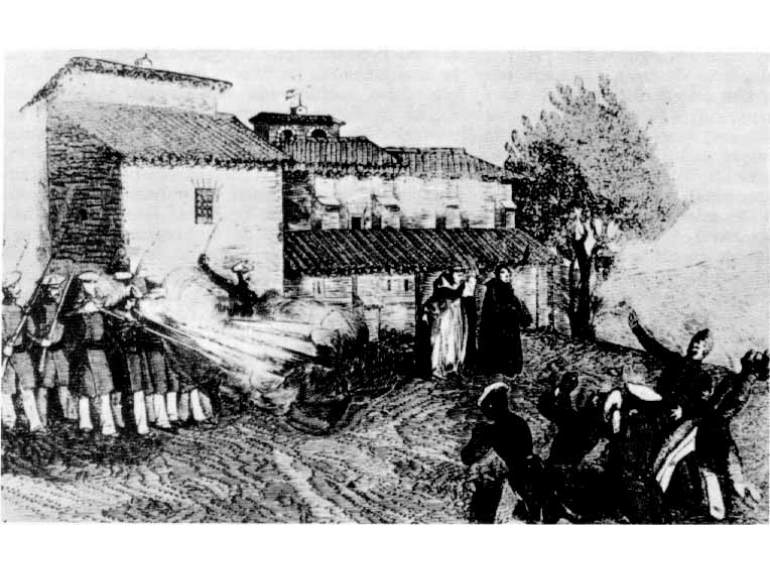
Artistic recreation of the executions of Estella. Published for the first time in the work Galería Militar Contemporánea (1846)

Maroto sent Carmona (who had also conspired against him) to Estella as an emissary to communicate his orders to the soldier Francisco García, ringleader of the conspiracy against Maroto in that city. This soldier had been Comisario de Guerra during the reign of Ferdinand VII and now belonged to Teijeiro's group, enemies of general Maroto, ready to inspire the troops in Estella to insubordination and to disobey their general's orders. He accused them of sedition. Maroto's orders were that they wait in a determined place, with the entire regiment, in order that he might harangue them. The chronicles that recount these events record that Maroto entered Estella in the company only of his escort, but with other forces following him at a distance. The streets were empty and Francisco García waited in his home, devising extralegal contingencies from the orders he previously received. At 8 o'clock in the evening Maroto received the news that García had been preparing to flee disguised as a priest when he was arrested by Maroto's men. The Estella army supported its general, and did not accept orders other than his, which gave Maroto great comfort. After the arrest Carmona and the followers of Francisco García were imprisoned. Their military sedition was publicly proven.

The generals Juan Antonio Guergué, Francisco García and Pablo Sanz Baeza had been arrested by this time, along with the quartermaster general Úriz. They were imprisoned in the castle of Puig together with other rebels, and on February 18, 1839, all four were executed, as were the officials Sanz e Ibáñez and the brigadier Carmona.

Following these events, Maroto wrote Don Carlos a detailed letter with information about the conspiracies and disagreements in the very heart of the northern Carlists, as well as a report of the current condition of the imprisoned military leaders. At the same time this letter reached its addressee, it was published and released to the public.

All of these events were compiled and recorded by a soldier of the time, Manuel Lassala y Soleras, in a book which carried the lengthy title of: "History of the Carlist party, of its divisions, of its government, of its ideas, and of the Convention of Vergara: with biographical notes that explain who were Don Carlos, his generals, his favorites and principal ministers."

Pío Baroja, in his work "Aviraneta, or the life of a conspirator", gave the following narration of what happened in Estella:

One day a rumor began that Maroto was approaching the town with his troops… Those rumors were true. Maroto was already at the gates of the city. In mid-afternoon the generalísimo's troops began to enter Estella. General García went on the balcony of his house, and they did not salute or present arms to him. They said that the battalions from Navarre were taking positions… to oppose Matoro's advance, but it was not true. In the early morning, the Navarrese generals Guergué, García, Sanz, and Carmona were shot. They were executed in a threshing floor behind the prior's house, shot in the back while kneeling, like traitors.

=== Reactions ===
As a result of these events, Teixeiro drew up a decree, which Don Carlos signed. In the document, Don Carlos declined all responsibility for what had occurred, accused Maroto of crimes and arbitrary acts, and menaced all who would support him: "…Separated now from the command of the army, I declare him a traitor, likewise anyone who after this declaration, which I wist to be given the greatest publicity, assists or obeys him." Nonetheless, the commanders of Estella's battalions presented their respect and loyalty to Maroto, and disobeyed the decree.

Maroto commanded the battalions to assemble on the Camino Real from Vitoria to Pamplona (in total, more than 7,000 men). Surrounded by a respectful silence he ordered that the accusatory decree be read in a loud voice. At its conclusion, he asked those whose consciences so dictated to comply. But he was acclaimed and cheered with a great cry by the soldiers and officers alike. Maroto closed his address by saying "I have triumphed over the arbitrariness, injustice and blindness of a prince, and history will judge me in due course."

The Carlists Urbiztondo, Silvestre, Izarbe and Count Negri met with Don Carlos, making him see that Maroto's conduct as a soldier had been correct, after which the prince signed a new decree in which he retracted the earlier decree, ordering the gathering and burning of the pages of the published manifesto, and returned military honors to Maroto. Twenty-five individuals implicated in the attacks on Maroto were exiled: soldiers, clergy and civilians. They were taken to France by General Urbiztondo, Colonel Leandro Eguía, and Lieutenant-Colonel Rafael Erausquin, guarded by a company of Alavesan soldiers.

=== The "Marotist" party ===
In spite of the foregoing, intrigues and hostilities continued between the enemies and the followers of Maroto. A marotista ("Marotist") party grew, entirely loyal to the Carlist cause but opposed to how the war was being conducted.

=== Preliminaries to the Convention of Vergara ===
- Related article: Convention of Vergara

After the failure of the Royal Expedition, General Espartero received an official letter signed by Queen Isabella II's Secretary of War, in which he was given responsibility for the termination of the war along with 25 million reales for the proceedings. General Isidro de Alaix Fábregas, in the name of Espartero, communicated this letter to Maroto. Maroto insisted that he would do what was best for the good of Spain. The result was a meeting between the two opposing generals that took place in the hermitage of San Antolín de Abadiano near Durango. The English colonel Wylde attended the Abadiano conference as an observer, because of Britain's recent role as mediator; also present was brigadier Francisco Linage, secretary to Espartero. But the negotiations were stymied by the matter of fueros: Maroto had promised to defend the fueros and Espartero held that they were unconstitutional.

As negotiations took place, both armies were positioned and prepared, although they did not battle. Espartero soon insisted on the negotiations proceeding. The leaders present at the reading of the manifesto decided to name a commission in order to negotiate with him. La Torre and Urbiztondo went before the commission without Maroto and formalized with Espartero the Convention of Vergara, whose first written version still lacked Maroto's signature, although everything that it expounded was in his name. Later, Espartero sent a copy to Maroto with a request to sign it formally.

The first article of the accord was related to fueros, and declared that "Captain General Don Baldomero Espartero will press the government to fulfil its offer to undertake formally to propose to the Cortes the concession or modification of the fueros."

Despite the treaty having been signed by these high-ranking officers, the Navarrese battalions, above all, felt a certain repugnance, distrust and discontent, to the point that some officials still intended military revolt.

=== August 31, 1839 ===
In Vergara, General Espartero and his constitutional troops were waiting. When the Castilian battalions and squadrons arrived, as well as the Biscayans and Guipuzcoans, Espartero gave a speech in which he gave them the option of continuing in the Queen's service or returning to their homes. History recounts that all of them decided to adhere to the treaty.

Alterwards, Rafael Maroto gave a stirring speech:

Volunteers and Basque countrymen, no one was more devoted than I to restoring the right to the Spanish throne to Carlos María Isidro de Borbón, but none is more convinced by the experience of a multitude of events, that never could this prince bring my country happiness, which is the sole motive of my heart.

The words of Maroto and Espartero are preserved in the minutes of the meeting, and have been duly preserved.

In the Cuartel General of Vergara, on 1 September 1839, Espartero addressed the Basque and Navarrese people for the last time, notifying them of the peace that had been reached in Vergara and of the incorporation of the armies under his command:

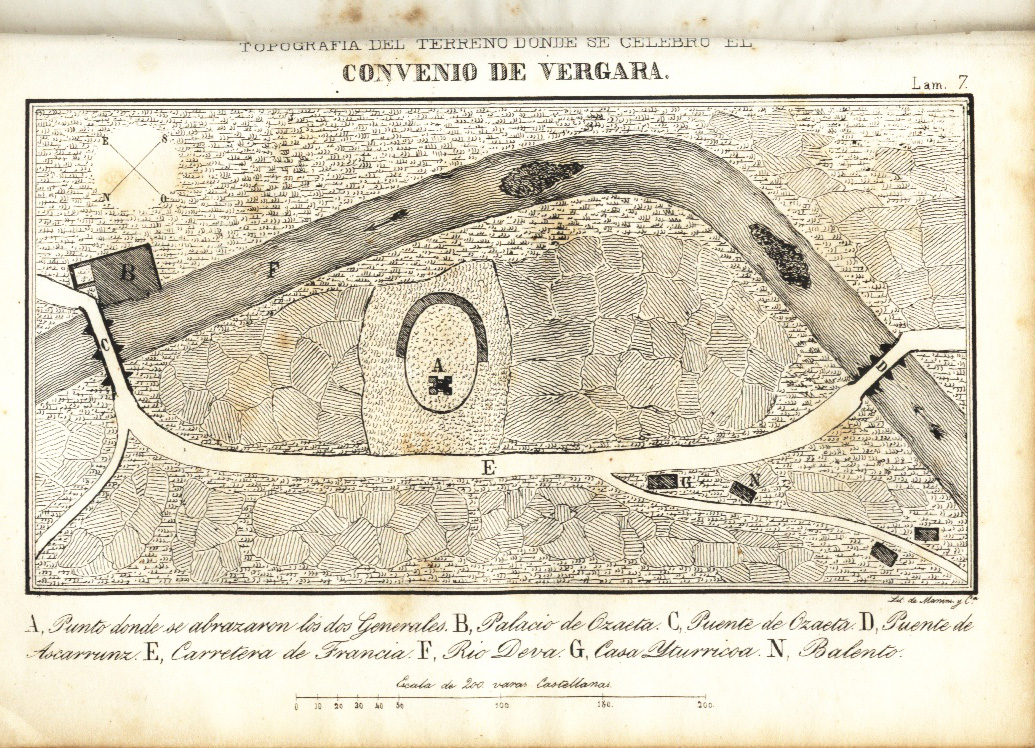

General Rafael Maroto and the Biscayan, Guipuzcoan and Castilian divisions, who had received only slights and sad deceptions from the royal pretender have now heard the voice of peace and have united with the force of my command to end the war.

With the conflict at an end, he resumed the rank of lieutenant general and was named Minister of the Supreme Tribunal of War and Marine.

== Last years ==
On 11 September 1846, he left for the Americas again with his daughter Margarita. He first attempted to disembark in Peru, but President Ramón Castilla, whose brother had been a Carlist officer in Spain, barred him from entering the country. He then headed for Chile, where he still owned an hacienda that he had inherited from his deceased wife. He landed in Valparaíso on 22 December and took over the aforementioned property, located near the town of Concón.

He died in Valparaíso, on 25 August 1853, after moving there to receive better medical care for his illness. On his gravestone is mentioned that he was a Lieutenant Colonel of the Spanish Army and his nobiliary titles of "Viscount of Elgueta" and "Count of Casa Maroto". Later on his remains were moved to an Army Memorial mausoleum in the anniversary of the Battle of Chacabuco, on 2 June 1918, to be buried in wall tomb number 77 with a new epitaph: "The Army of Chile to the Spanish Army Brigadier Don Rafael Maroto"

Rafael Maroto is a controversial figure. Some historians labelled him a traitor to the Carlist cause because his intervention in the Convention of Vergara, while others believe it was an intelligent and reasonable action, considering the hopeless state of the almost defeated Carlist army.

== Personnel record ==
Year	Month and Day	Employment
1794	April 1	Joined the Regiment of Infantry "Asturias" as enlisted cadet before reaching his age of majority.
1798	June 15	Promoted to ensign.
1801	October 23	Promoted to second lieutenant (first ensign).
1806	October 15	Promoted to Lieutenant
1808	September 8	Promoted to Captain
1809	March 9	Promoted to Lieutenant Colonel
1811	December 6	Promoted to Sergeant Major
1813	November 16	Promoted to Colonel
1814	November 8	Brigadier
1823	October 5	Field Marshal
1832		Commanding General of the Province of Toledo
1836		Commanding General of the forces of Lordship of Vizcaya
1839		As a result of the Vergara Convention, his rank of lieutenant general, obtained in 1834 after joining the army of Don Carlos in Portugal, was accepted as valid and reaffirmed.

== Decorations ==
- Great Cross of the Real Militar Orden Americana de Isabel la Católica, awarded February 6, 1827 by King Ferdinand VII.
- Knight of the Real y Militar Orden de San Hermenegildo.
- Cross and distinction award for the defense of Zaragoza and then its second siege.
- Three shields of distinction for the campaigns in the War of Spanish Independence.

== Maroto and the Episodios Nacionales ==
In the Episodios Nacionales series of historical books by Benito Pérez Galdós, Maroto is mentioned several times:

- In 'Vergara': "He cordially detested Maroto, neither for being a bad officer, which he never was, nor because he opposed his cause. The cause was that in one occasion when Maroto was himself in a tight spot, while crossing the border into Portugal, Don Rafael has let out a certain word near the royal ears, the most common of the Spanish expletives, disrespect for which the King never forgave him."
- In 'De Oñate a La Granja': "Another of those who abandoned the royal dwelling at late afternoon was Don Rafael Maroto, a figure of certain importance in the Carlism, an ideology that he embraced with fervour from the very beginning of the monarchist schism."
- In 'Un faccioso más y algunos frailes menos': "Some of us had in mind the project of ordaining and establishing a Constitution for Peru, but that traitor named Maroto opposed."

=== Sources ===
- Arizaga, J.M. de: Memoria militar y política sobre la guerra de Navarra, los fusilamientos de Estella, y los principales acontecimientos que determinaron el fin de la causa de D. Carlos Isidro de Borbón, Madrid, Imprenta de D. Vicente de Lalama, 1840.
- Bullón de Mendoza, Alfonso: La Primera Guerra Carlista, Madrid, Actas, 1992
- Bullón de Mendoza, Alfonso: "Don Carlos y Maroto", Aportes, 29 (1995), pp. 79–94.
- Chamorro y Baquerizo, Pedro: Estado Mayor General del Ejército Español. Sección tenientes generales, pp. 41 y ss.
- Ferrer, Melchor: Historia del Tradicionalismo Español, tomos II-XVII.
- PIRALA y CRIADO, Antonio. Vindicación del general Maroto y manifiesto razonado de las causas del Convenio de Vergara. Urgoiti editores, Pamplona 2005. ISBN 84-933398-8-1
- Pirala y Criado, Antonio: Historia del Convenio de Vergara. Enciclopedia Moderna del Señor Mellado. Madrid 1852.
- Pirala y Criado, Antonio: Historia de la guerra civil y de los partidos liberal y carlista. Madrid. Mellado. 1858-56. Cinco tomos.
- RESUMEN histórico de la campaña sostenida en el territorio Vasco Navarro a nombre de Don Carlos de Borbón de 1833 a 1839, e Impugnación del libro que sale a la luz con el título de "Vindicación del General Maroto", Madrid, Imp. de José C. de la Peña, 1846–1847, 2 vols.
- Torres Marín, Manuel: Chacabuco y Vergara. Sino y camino del teniente general Rafael Maroto Yserns, Santiago de Chile, Editorial Andrés Bello, 1981.

=== Other sources ===
- Documentation on Rafael Maroto's military file provided by General Militar Archive of Segovia on request of Ms Lourdes Cardenal. (February 2006)

== See also ==
- House of Maroto
- Battle of Ayacucho
- Battle of Junín
- Conferencias de Miraflores
- Constitutional Congress of Peru (1822)
- Liberating Expedition of Peru
- Independence of Peru
- Landing of José de San Martín in Peru
- Muñagorriren bertsoak

== Notes ==
- This article draws heavily on the corresponding article in the Spanish-language Wikipedia, which was accessed in the version of 31 July 2006.
