= Convention of Vergara =

1839 treaty ending the major fighting in the First Carlist War

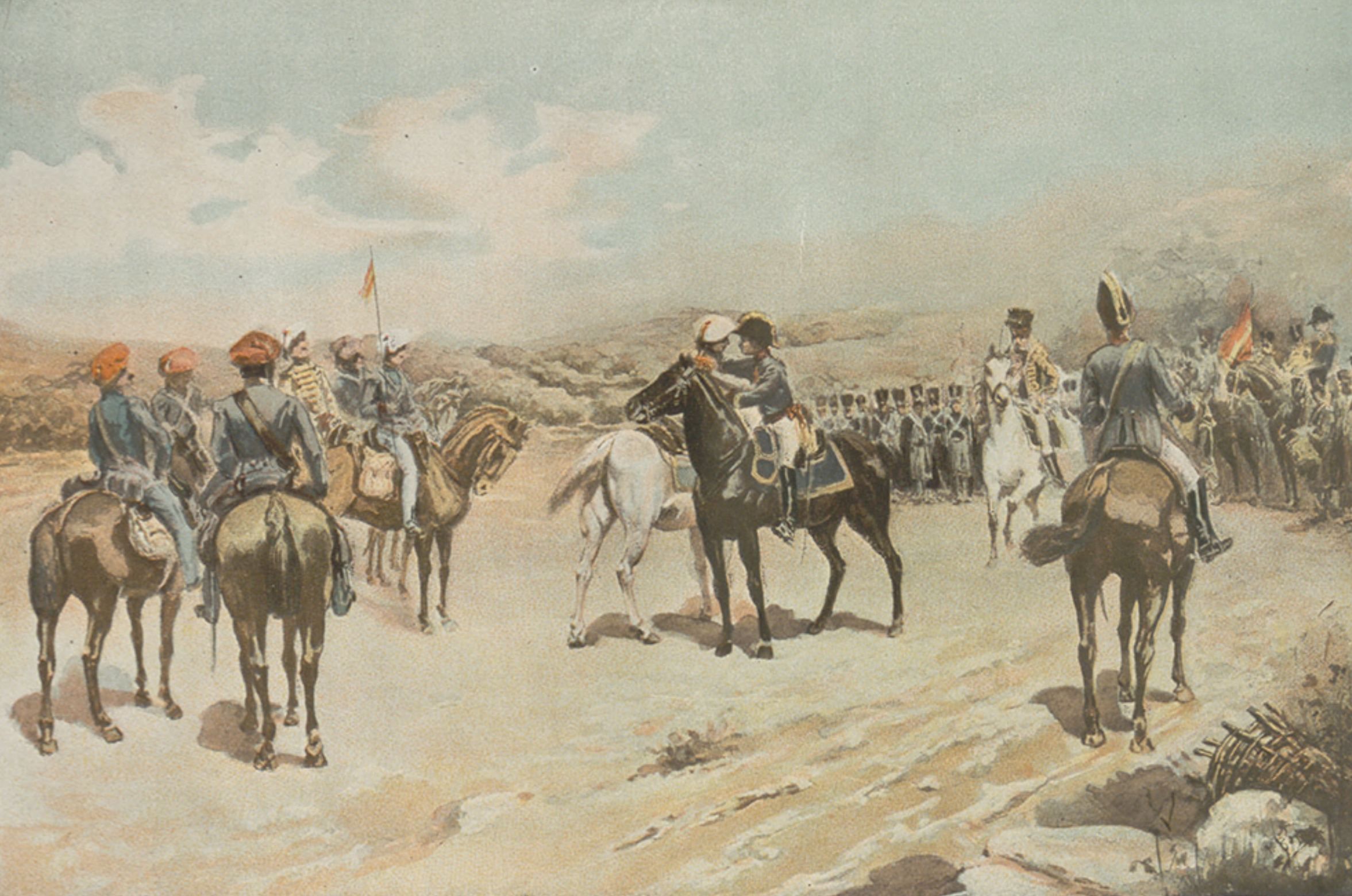
Convention of Vergara

The Convention of Vergara (Spanish: Convenio de Vergara, Basque: Bergarako hitzarmena), entered into on 31 August 1839, was a treaty successfully ending the major fighting in Spain's First Carlist War. The treaty, also known by many other names including the Embrace of Vergara (Spanish: Abrazo de Vergara), was signed by Baldomero Espartero for the Isabelines (or "Constitutionalists") and Rafael Maroto for the Carlists.

The two generals met at the hermitage of San Antolín de Abadiano near Durango, Biscay. The British commissioner Colonel Wylde attended as an observer, because of Britain's recent role as mediator in the conflict and the 1835 Lord Eliot Convention on prisoners of war, mainly to end the indiscriminate executions by firing squad that had been committed by both sides. Also present was Brigadier Francisco Linage, secretary to Espartero.

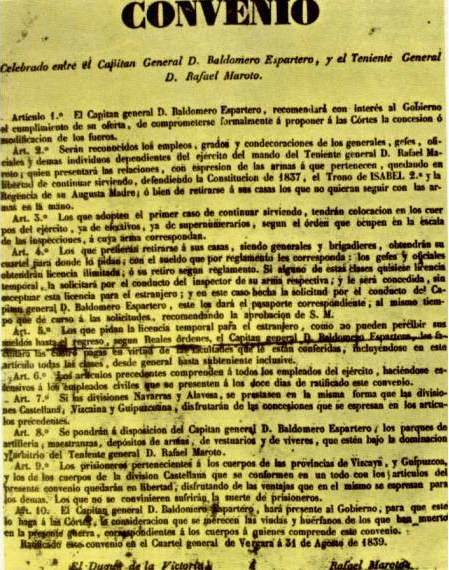
Text of the Vergara Agreement (1839)

Initially, negotiations were stymied by the matter of home rule (fueros), the specific institutional and legal framework of the Basque Country (Basque Provinces and Navarre). Maroto had promised to defend the fueros, but Espartero held that they were unconstitutional.

As negotiations took place, both armies remained positioned and prepared although they did not battle. Two less-senior Carlist officers, La Torre and Urbiztondo, formalised the treaty with Espartero. The first written version still lacked Maroto's signature although everything that it expounded was in his name. Later, Espartero sent a copy to Maroto with a request to sign it formally.

The first article of the treaty was related to Basque home rule (fueros) and declared, "Captain General Don Baldomero Espartero will strongly recommend to the government the compliance of his offer to commit formally to a proposal to the Spanish Parliament authorizing or modifying the fueros".

Although the treaty had been signed by high-ranking officers, the Navarrese battalions, above all, felt a certain repugnance, distrust and discontent, and some officials still intended military revolt. However, on August 31, 1839, in Vergara (Bergara), Gipuzkoa, General Espartero, his troops at the ready, gave a speech to the assembled troops of all sides in which he gave them the option of continuing in the Queen's service or returning to their homes. The story is that all of them decided to adhere to the treaty.

Afterwards, Rafael Maroto gave a stirring speech:

"Volunteers and Basque peoples, no one was more devoted than I to restoring the right to the Spanish throne to Carlos María Isidro de Borbón, but none is more convinced by the experience of a multitude of events, that never could this prince bring my country happiness, which is the sole motive of my heart".

With the conflict at an end, Maroto resumed the rank of lieutenant general and was named Minister of the Supreme Tribunal of War and Marine.

== Legacy ==
The embrace of Generals Espartero and Maroto has been commemorated in miniature art. The L'Iber, Museum of Toy Soldiers in Valencia houses a full diorama of the scene, set within its Victoria Eugenia Gallery, which traces the history of Spain through the personal guards of its heads of state from the 8th century to the reign of Juan Carlos I.
