= José de Barrasa y Fernández de Castro =

Spanish politician (1847–1929)

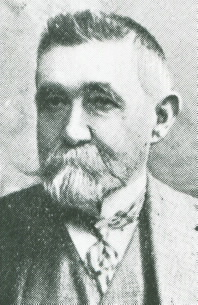

José de Barrasa y Fernández de Castro (Cádiz, 1847–1929) was a sailor, politician and senator of the Kingdom of Spain.

== Personal life ==
José de Barrasa y Fernández de Castro was born in 1847 into a high-society family from Cadiz, working in the bourgeoisie and the Navy.

He participated in the Spanish-American War as a ship captain, commanding the Third Division of the Spanish Navy, which was composed solely of three auxiliary cruisers, the Buenos Aires, the Antonio López, and the Alfonso XII. His division was eventually assigned to Cape San Roque, Brazil, to harass enemy merchant traffic. In his military career in the Navy, he reached the rank of vice admiral. He was also governor of Equatorial Guinea (from May 3, 1886 to January 2, 1887), whose actions were decisive both in containing Franco-German expansionism in the Muni and in the delimitation of a territory that Spain would vigorously claim in subsequent years.

Due to his good work as interim governor, years later he was appointed the colony's highest authority to combat French pressure on Bata and the Benito River.

The clear purpose of his second appointment as governor of the Gulf of Guinea was to scrupulously respect the terms of the status in order to avoid any violent incident that would make a diplomatic solution to the dispute impossible. From 1890 he showed himself to be one of the most faithful friends of the Cadiz politician Canalejas. As a Canalejista, he was elected deputy (1910–1914) and senator (1916) of the Kingdom of Spain. In 1910, he was director general of Navigation and Maritime Fishing, while in that position he was offered the position of Minister of the Navy by President Canalejas, which Barrasa himself rejected.

He was a member of the Liberal Party, of which he became president in Cádiz.

Throughout his life he received numerous awards, such as the Pacific Campaign Medal, and was also named a Meritorious Son of the Fatherland.

He died on 18 January 1929.
