= Jacinto Barrasa =

Jacinto Barrasa (or Barraza) (born at Lima, Peru, early in the seventeenth century; died there, 22 November 1704) was a Peruvian Jesuit preacher and historian.

In the seventeenth century, the different religious orders appointed historiographers or official chroniclers of the work done in their American provinces. The Jesuits selected Ignacio de Arbieto for their Peruvian missions, but as his account was not accepted, Jacinto Barrasa was appointed in his stead.

== Works ==
His fame was principally as a preacher, and two volumes of his "Sermones" were published, one at Madrid in 1678, the other at Lima in 1679. In the latter year he finished his voluminous history of the Society of Jesus in Peru, which is still at Lima in private hands, and comprises 1,350 pages of manuscript. Its title is: Historia de las fundaciones de los colegios y casas de la Compania de Jesus, con la noticia de las vidas y virtudes religiosas de algunos varones ilustres que en ella trabajaron. No allusions are made in that chronicle to any other events than those of a religious or ecclesiastical nature.

In addition to his "Sermones", a "Panegirico", pronounced by him in 1669 on the beatification of Rose of Lima, was also printed.

== Attribution ==
- The entry cites:
  - Enrique Torres Saldamando, Los Antiquos Jesuitas del Peru (Lima, 1882);
  - Bernabé Cobo, Historia de la fundacion de Lima (published at Lima, 1882, but written in 1639).
