= 1936 uprising in Spanish Guinea =

Armed conflict during the Spanish Civil War

Coordinates: 1°35′N 10°21′E

- Part of the Spanish Civil War
- Location of Spanish Guinea in central Africa.
Date	19 September – October 1936
Location	Spanish Guinea
Result	Nationalist victory

Belligerents
(Spain) Spanish Republic	(Francoist Spain) Nationalist Spain

Commanders and leaders
(Spain) Miguel Hernández Porcel	(Francoist Spain) Luis Serrano Maranges

The 1936 uprising in Spanish Guinea was an armed conflict over the control of Spanish Guinea (present-day Equatorial Guinea) during the course of the Spanish Civil War, fought between the republican and nationalist forces between September and October 1936. The nationalists initially took control of Fernando Po on 19 September, later seizing control of the rest of the colony after receiving reinforcements in October.

== Background ==
The Spanish Empire established the colony of Spanish Guinea in 1778, in the aftermath of the Treaty of El Pardo, between the former and the Kingdom of Portugal. Portuguese slave traders retained the de facto control of the region until Carlos Chacón was declared its first governor general in 1858. During the course of the Scramble for Africa, Spain lost significant portions of its territories in the Gulf of Guinea to France and Germany. Its disastrous defeat in the Spanish–American War of 1898, further reduced its colonial possessions, while simultaneously increasing Spanish Guinea's importance as an overseas territory. Exploitation of the colony's natural resources began in earnest, missionaries set up permanent outposts across its territory and the Colonial Guard of Spanish Guinea was formed in 1908 to protect its new settlers.

Following the establishment of the Second Spanish Republic, colonial policies shifted towards increasing Guinea's economic output. To that end, the government limited the influence of Claretian Catholic missionaries and legal rights of the native population. On 13 July 1936, Spanish nationalist legislator José Calvo Sotelo was assassinated in Madrid by Guardia de Asalto members, setting a nationalist coup in motion four days later. The outbreak of the civil war in the Spanish mainland, led to confrontations between the supporters of the left wing Popular Front and clericales (supporters of the nationalist rebels and the Catholic church) across the colony. Tensions continued to escalate during the course of the summer as bank accounts were frozen and shipments failed to reach the colony.

== Conflict ==
On 19 September 1936, the chief of the Colonial Guard lieutenant colonel Luis Serrano Maranges launched an uprising on Fernando Po overthrowing the Republican Governor-General Sanchez Guerra in a bloodless coup. Following Francisco Franco's orders, Serrano took over the governorship and imposed martial law, declaring the colony to be at war. Vice-Governor Miguel Hernandez Porcel who was based in Bata, refused to recognize Serrano. On 23 September, clericales on the colony's mainland organized a militia and marched on Bata in support of Serrano, and Porcel dispatched a force to stop them. The two columns met at Comandachina close to the Ekuku river, they clashed after shouting their respective mottos. Two native soldiers were killed in the action as the Republicans emerged victorious. The leaders of the clericales in the mainland were expelled to French Congo, many later traveled Fernando Po. The colony thus became split between the pro-nationalist Fernando Po and the Republican Río Muni.

The republicans became practically isolated from their allies, having turned their only available ship, the Fernando Po, into a prison for Catholic missionaries and nuns. In October, the nationalist auxiliary cruiser Ciudad de Mahon, armed with a 76 mm gun, a 101 mm gun and ferrying Moroccan nationalist troops from the Canary Islands, arrived at Fernando Po. Serrano requisitioned the ship, using it to shell Bata and hit Fernando Po, killing three clergymen and a civilian held on board as prisoners in the process. The republican militiamen manning the Fernando Po abandoned hastily the sinking ship, whose hull was assaulted by troops from Ciudad de Mahon before capsizing the following day. The nationalist reinforcements then landed in Bata, quickly seizing control of Río Muni. Most republicans fled to French Congo, some of those who remained were executed while others were deported to the Canary Islands in November.

== Aftermath ==
The conflict in combination with the disruption of global trade during World War II caused the colony to experience shortages in food and medication as well as high inflation. After taking control of the colony the nationalists Hispanicized the names of the local districts, legally unified Fernando Po and Río Muni with the rest of Spain and gradually emancipated the native population. The ideals of nationalism spread among the first generation of emancipated natives, who later led the colony to independence in 1968.
