= 2021 in Equatorial Guinea =

- Decades: 2000s; 2010s; 2020s
- See also: Other events of 2021; Timeline of Equatoguinean history

Events in the year 2021 in Equatorial Guinea.

== Incumbents ==
- President: Teodoro Obiang Nguema Mbasogo
- Prime Minister: Francisco Pascual Obama Asue

== Events ==
Ongoing — COVID-19 pandemic in Equatorial Guinea

- March 7 - A series of four explosions occurred at a military base in the city of Bata, killing at least 20 people and injuring about 600. The number of deaths in the 2021 Bata explosions was later increased to 98 and 615 injured; 299 are still in the hospital. Almost every building in the city of 200,000 was damaged. Spain promises aide.
- March 10 – The government calls for three days of mourning following the March 7 explosion in Bata. Human Rights Watch (HRW) says the number of victims exceeds the 105 reported deaths and calls for an independent investigation. HRW also recommends individuals and organizations reach out to families of victims directly rather than through the government, which it calls corrupt.

== Deaths ==
- 3 March – Celestino Bonifacio Bacalé, politician (born 1957).
