= 2026 in Equatorial Guinea =

- Decades: 2000s; 2010s; 2020s
- See also: Other events of 2026; Timeline of Equatoguinean history

Events in the year 2026 in Equatorial Guinea.

== Incumbents ==
- President: Teodoro Obiang Nguema Mbasogo
- Prime Minister: Manuel Osa Nsue Nsua
- Vice President: Teodoro Nguema Obiang Mangue

== Events ==
- 3 January – Equatorial Guinea officially announces that its capital city will change from Malabo to Ciudad de la Paz.
- 3 February – Cameroon and Equatorial Guinea sign an agreement to jointly extract natural gas from the Yoyo-Yolanda field.
- 21–23 April – Pope Leo XIV visits Equatorial Guinea.
- 5 June – A group of human rights lawyers and organizations file a case against Equatorial Guinea before the African Commission on Human and Peoples' Rights for the forced repatriation of migrants deported from the US.
- 16 June – Prime minister Manuel Osa Nsue Nsua submits the collective resignation of the Council of Ministers and of the government, after failing to meet its performance targets.
- 19 June – A Harbin Z-9 of the Armed Forces of Equatorial Guinea crashes into a mountain range between Niefang and Evinayong, killing all four occupants.

== Holidays ==
- 1 January: New Year's Day
- 18 April: Good Friday
- 1 May: Labour Day
- 5 June: President's Day
- 19 June: Corpus Christi
- 3 August: Freedom Day
- 15 August: Constitution Day
- 12 October: Independence Day
- 8 December: Immaculate Conception
- 25 December: Christmas Day
