= 2022 in Equatorial Guinea =

- Decades: 2000s; 2010s; 2020s
- See also: Other events of 2022; Timeline of Equatoguinean history

Events in the year 2022 in Equatorial Guinea.

== Incumbents ==
- President: Teodoro Obiang Nguema Mbasogo
- Prime Minister: Francisco Pascual Obama Asue

== Events ==
Ongoing — COVID-19 pandemic in Equatorial Guinea

- 9 September – Parliament approves to bring forward the presidential elections to November.
- 19 September – Equatorial Guinea abolishes the death penalty after its president Teodoro Obiang Nguema Mbasogo signs a new penal code into law.
- November – 2022 Equatorial Guinean general election scheduled to take place.

== Deaths ==
- 14 September – Mariano Ondo, footballer (born 1999)
