= 2020 in Equatorial Guinea =

- Decades: 2000s; 2010s; 2020s
- See also: Other events of 2020; Timeline of Equatoguinean history

Events in the year 2020 in Equatorial Guinea.

== Incumbents ==
- President: Teodoro Obiang Nguema Mbasogo
- Prime Minister: Francisco Pascual Obama Asue

== Events ==
- 14 March – First confirmed case of COVID-19 in Equatorial Guinea

=== Sport ===
- 11 January – start of the 2019–20 Equatoguinean Primera División

== Deaths ==
- 6 February – André Neles, footballer (b. 1978).
- 8 April – Miguel Jones, Equatoguinean-born Spanish footballer (b. 1938).
- 8 July – Santiago Nchama, politician (born c. 1950).

== See also ==
- COVID-19 pandemic in Equatorial Guinea
