= 2023 in Equatorial Guinea =

- Decades: 2000s; 2010s; 2020s
- See also: Other events of 2023; Timeline of Equatoguinean history

Events in the year 2023 in Equatorial Guinea.

== Incumbents ==
- President: Teodoro Obiang Nguema Mbasogo
- Prime Minister: Francisco Pascual Obama Asue (until 1 February), Manuela Roka Botey (starting 1 February)
- Vice President: Teodoro Nguema Obiang Mangue

== Events ==
Ongoing — COVID-19 pandemic in Equatorial Guinea

- 4 January – The Supreme Court of Spain says that it will investigate two sons of Equatorial Guinean president Teodoro Obiang Nguema Mbasogo over the kidnapping and torture of two Spanish citizens who oppose Obiang's rule.
- 7 February – An outbreak of an unknown illness causing hemorrhagic fever is reported. This was later determined to be Marburg virus. See main article at 2023 Marburg virus disease outbreak in Equatorial Guinea.
- 13 February – The Equatoguinean health ministry confirms an outbreak of the Marburg virus in the country, which has killed nine people within the last month.
- 23 March – Equatorial Guinea confirms eight new cases of the Marburg virus, bringing the total cases to nine in the country.
