= Economy of Equatorial Guinea =

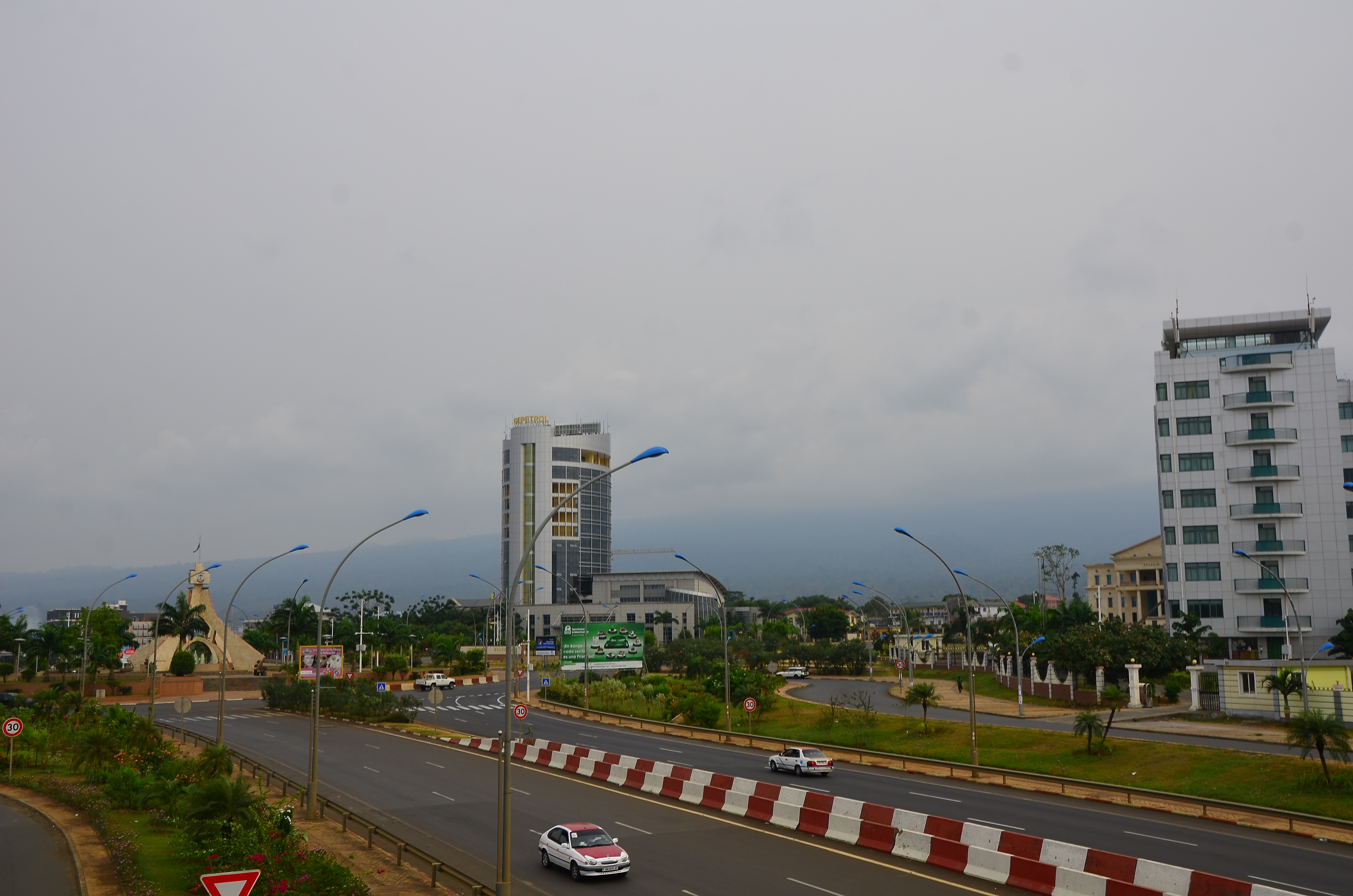
- Malabo, largest city in Equatorial Guinea
- Currency: Communauté Financière Africaine franc (XAF)
- Fiscal year: calendar year
- Trade organizations: AU, AfCFTA, ECCAS, UDEAC, WTO (observer)
- Country group: Developing/Emerging; Upper-middle income economy

Statistics
- GDP: ▲$12.68 billion (nominal; 2025); ▼$33 billion (PPP; 2025)
- GDP rank: 149th (nominal; 2025); 149th (PPP; 2025)
- GDP growth: 4.2% (2025); 0% (2026f)
- GDP per capita: ▼$7,750 (nominal; 2025); ▼$20,170 (PPP; 2025)
- GDP per capita rank: 96th (nominal; 2025); 92nd (PPP; 2025)
- GDP per capita growth: -8.1% (2025)
- GDP by sector: agriculture: 2.9%, industry: 51.2%, services: 44.9% (2023 est.)
- Inflation (CPI): 2.5% (2023 est.)
- Population below national poverty line: 2/3 of the population (2020)
- Human Development Index: ▼0.650 medium (2022) (133rd); N/A IHDI (2018)
- Unemployment: 8.7% (2023)
- Main industries: petroleum, fishing, saw-milling, natural gas

External
- Exports: $6.2 billion (2022 est.)
- Main export partners: Zambia 21%; Spain 15%; China 15%; India 10%; Italy 6%; (2022 est.)
- Imports: $4.297 billion (2022 est.)
- Main import partners: Zambia 38%; China 14%; Spain 10%; Nigeria 7%; United States 4%; (2022 est.)

Public finance
- Government debt: external: $4.5 billion (2017)
- Revenue: $3.62 billion (2022)
- Spending: $1.512 billion (2022)
- Economic aid: none
- All values, unless otherwise stated, are in US dollars.

Equatorial Guinea has a developing economy. It has normally traditionally been dependent on commodities such as cocoa and coffee, but is now heavily dependent on natural gas due to the discovery and exploitation of significant oil reserves in the 1980s. In 2017, it graduated from "Least Developed Country" status, one of six Sub-Saharan African nations that managed to do so.

The country has been ranked only 138th out of 188 countries on the United Nations Human Development Index in 2015 and despite its impressive GNI figure, it is still plagued by extreme poverty. After the oil price collapsed in 2014, the economy went into a free fall which put growth in a downward spiral from around 15% to −10%. Only 950,000 of 1.6 million inhabitants are citizens, giving Equatorial Guinea the largest ratio of expatriates to residents in Africa.

== Economy overview ==
Pre-independence Equatorial Guinea counted on cocoa production for hard currency earnings. In 1959, it had the highest per capita income of Africa which it still has, after several decades as one of the poorest countries in the world.

The discovery of large oil reserves in 1996 and their subsequent exploitation have contributed to a dramatic increase in government revenue. As of 2004, Equatorial Guinea was the third-largest oil producer in Sub-Saharan Africa. Its oil production had then risen to 360,000 barrels per day (57,000 m^{3}/d), up from 220,000 barrels per day (35,000 m^{3}/d) only two years earlier.

Forestry, farming, and fishing are also major components of GDP. Subsistence farming predominates. Although pre-independence Equatorial Guinea counted on cocoa production for hard currency earnings, the neglect of the rural economy under successive regimes has diminished potential for agriculture-led growth. However, the government has stated its intention to reinvest some oil revenue into agriculture. A number of aid programs sponsored by the World Bank and the IMF have been cut off since 1993 because of corruption and mismanagement. No longer eligible for concessional financing because of large oil revenues, the government has been unsuccessfully trying to agree on a "shadow" fiscal management program with the World Bank and IMF. Businesses, for the most part, are owned by government officials and their family members. Undeveloped natural resources include titanium, iron ore, manganese, uranium, and alluvial gold (Mining in Equatorial Guinea). Growth remained strong in 2005 and 2006, led by oil.

== In greater depth ==
Oil and gas exports have increased substantially. Real GDP growth reached 23% in 1999, and initial estimates suggested growth of about 15% in 2001, according to IMF 2001 forecast. Per capita income grew from about $1,000 in 1998 to about $2,000 in 2000. The energy export sector is responsible for this rapid growth. Oil production has increased from 81,000 barrels per day (12,900 m^{3}/d) to 210,000 barrels per day (33,000 m^{3}/d) between 1998 and early 2001. There is ongoing additional development of existing commercially viable oil and gas deposits as well as new exploration in other offshore concessions.

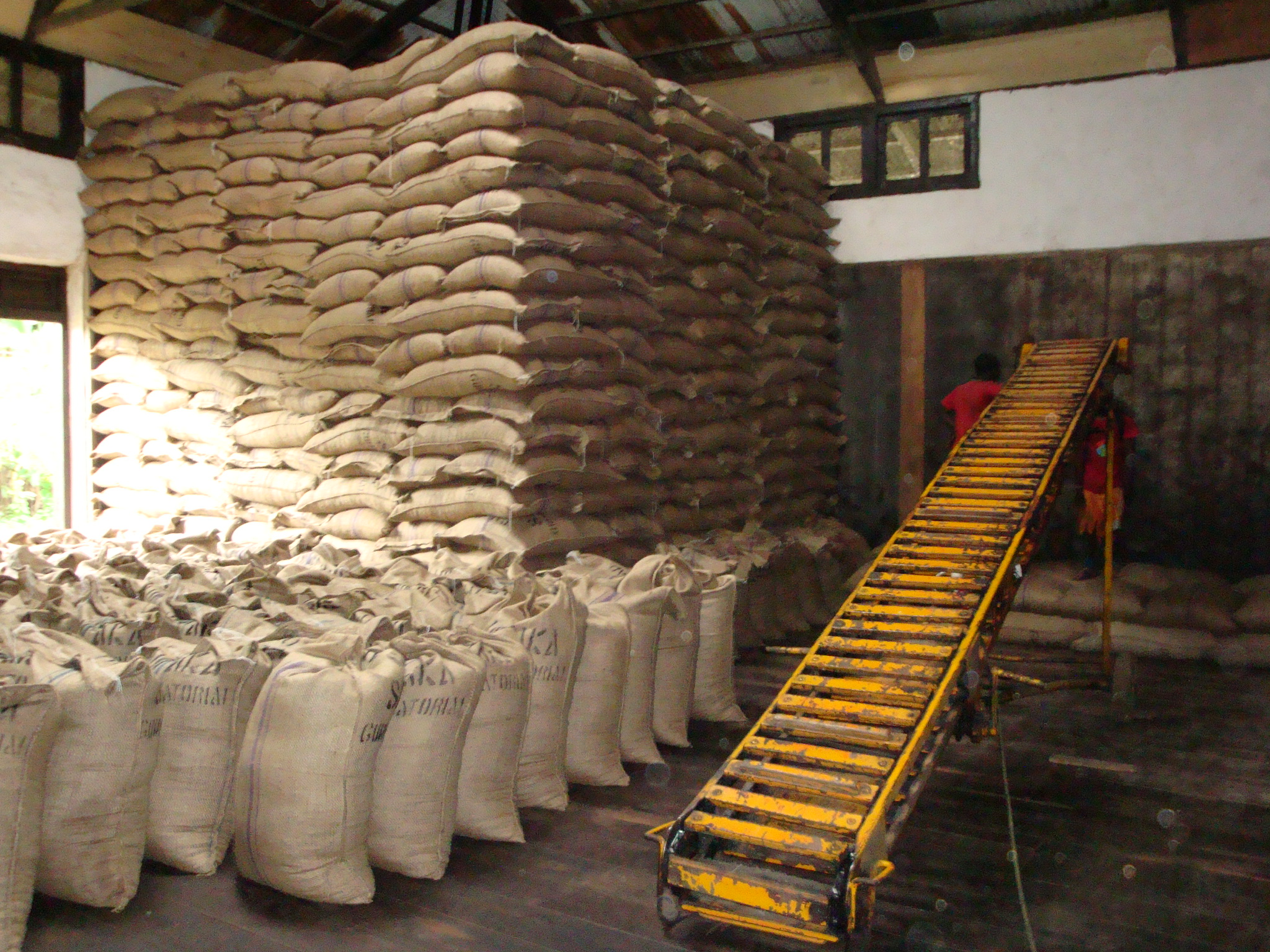
Cocoa factory (2008)

Equatorial Guinea has other largely unexploited human and natural resources, including a tropical climate, fertile soils, rich expanses of water, deepwater ports, and an untapped, if unskilled, source of labor. Following independence in 1968, the country suffered under a repressive dictatorship for 11 years, which devastated the economy. The agricultural sector, which historically was known for cocoa of the highest quality, has never fully recovered. In 1969, Equatorial Guinea produced 36,161 tons of highly bid cocoa, but production dropped to 4,800 tons in 2000. Coffee production also dropped sharply during this period to bounce back to 100,000 metric tons in 2000. Timber is the main source of foreign exchange after oil, accounting for about 12.4% of total export earnings in 1996–99. Timber production increased steadily during the 1990s; wood exports reached a record 789,000 cubic meters in 1999 as demand in Asia (mainly China) gathered pace after the 1998 economic crisis. Most of the production (mainly Okoume) goes to exports, and only 3% is processed locally. Environmentalists fear that exploitation at this level is unsustainable and point out to the permanent damage already inflicted on the forestry reserves on Bioko.

Consumer price inflation has declined from the 38.8% experienced in 1994 following the CFA franc devaluation, to 7.8% in 1998, and 1.0% in 1999, according to BEAC data. Consumer prices rose about 6% in 2000, according to initial estimates, and there was anecdotal evidence that price inflation was accelerating in 2001.

Equatorial Guinea's policies, as defined by law, comprise an open investment regime. Qualitative restrictions on imports, non-tariff protection, and many import licensing requirements were lifted in 1992, when the government adopted a public investment program endorsed by the World Bank. The government sold some state enterprises. It is attempting to create a more favourable investment climate, and its investment code contains numerous incentives for job creation, training, promotion of non-traditional exports, support of development projects and indigenous capital participation, freedom for repatriation of profits, exemption from certain taxes and capital, and other benefits. Trade regulations have been further liberalized since implementation in 1994 of the ICN turnover tax, in conformity with Central African tax and custom reform codes. The reform included elimination of quota restrictions and reductions in the range and amounts of tariffs. The CEMAC countries agreed to replace the ICN with a value added tax (VAT) in 1999.

While business laws promote a liberalized economy, the business climate remains difficult. Application of the laws remains selective. Corruption among officials is widespread, and many business deals are concluded under non-transparent circumstances.

There is little industry in the country, and the local market for industrial products is small. The government seeks to expand the role of free enterprise and to promote foreign investment but has had little success in creating an atmosphere conducive to investor interest.

The budget has grown enormously in the past 3 years as royalties and taxes on foreign company oil and gas production have provided new resources to a once poor government. The 2001 budget foresaw revenues of about 154 billion CFA francs (about U.S.$200 million), up about 50% from 2000 levels. Oil revenues account for about two-thirds of government revenue, and VAT and trade taxes are the other large revenue sources.

In 2001, government expenditures were expected to reach 158 billion CFA francs, up about 50% from 2000 levels. New investment projects represented about 40% of the budget, and personnel and internal and external debt payments represented about one-third of planned expenditures.

The government has undertaken a number of reforms since 1991 to reduce its predominant role in the economy and promote private sector development. Despite its diminishing role, the US State Department described some government interactions with the private sector as "capricious". Beginning in early 1997, the government initiated efforts to attract significant private sector involvement through a Corporate Council on Africa visit and numerous ministerial efforts. In 1998, the government privatized distribution of petroleum products. There are now Total and Mobil stations in the country. The government has expressed interest in privatizing the outmoded electricity utility. A French company operates cellular telephone service in cooperation with a state enterprise. The government is anxious for greater U.S. investment, and President Obiang visited the U.S. three times between 1999 and 2001 to encourage greater U.S. corporate interest. Investment in agriculture, fishing, livestock, and tourism are among sectors the government would like targeted.

Equatorial Guinea's balance-of-payments situation has improved substantially since the mid-1990s because of new oil and gas production and favorable world energy prices. Exports totaled about francs CFA 915 billion in 2000 (1.25B $US), up from CFA 437 billion (700M $US) in 1999. Crude oil exports accounted for more than 90% of export earnings in 2000. Timber exports, by contrast, represented only about 5% of export revenues in 2000. Additional oil production coming on line in 2001, combined with methanol gas exports from the new CMS-Nomeco plant, should increase export earnings substantially.

Imports into Equatorial Guinea also are growing very quickly. Imports totaled francs CFA 380 billion (530 M$US), up from franc CFA 261 million (420 M$US) in 1999. Imports of equipment used for the oil and gas sector accounted for about three-quarters of imports in 2000. Imports of capital equipment for public investment projects reached francs CFA 30 billion in 2000, up 40% from 1999 levels.

Equatorial Guinea's foreign debt stock was approximately francs CFA 69 billion (100 M$US) in 2000, slightly less than the debt stock in 1999, according to BEAC data. Equatorial Guinea's debt service ratio fell from 20% of GDP in 1994 to only 1% in 2000. Foreign exchange reserves were increasing slightly, although they were relatively low in terms of import coverage. According to the terms of the franc CFA zone, some of these reserves are kept in an account with the French Ministry of Finance.

Equatorial Guinea in the 1980s and 1990s received foreign assistance from numerous bilateral and multilateral donors, including European countries, the United States, and the World Bank. Many of these aid programs have ceased altogether or have diminished. Spain, France, and the European Union continue to provide some project assistance, as do China and Cuba. The government also has discussed working with World Bank assistance to develop government administrative capacity.

Equatorial Guinea operated under an IMF-negotiated Enhanced Structural Adjustment Facility (ESAF) until 1996. Since then, there have been no formal agreements or arrangements. The International monetary Fund held Article IV consultations (periodic country evaluations) in 1996, 1997, and in August 1999. After the 1999 consultations, IMF directors stressed the need for Equatorial Guinea to establish greater fiscal discipline, accountability, and more transparent management of public sector resources, especially energy sector revenue. IMF officials also have emphasized the need for economic data. In 1999, the government began attempting to meet IMF-imposed requirements, maintaining contact with IMF and the World Bank representatives. However, the newfound oil wealth allowed the government to avoid improving fiscal discipline, transparency and accountability.

== Infrastructure ==
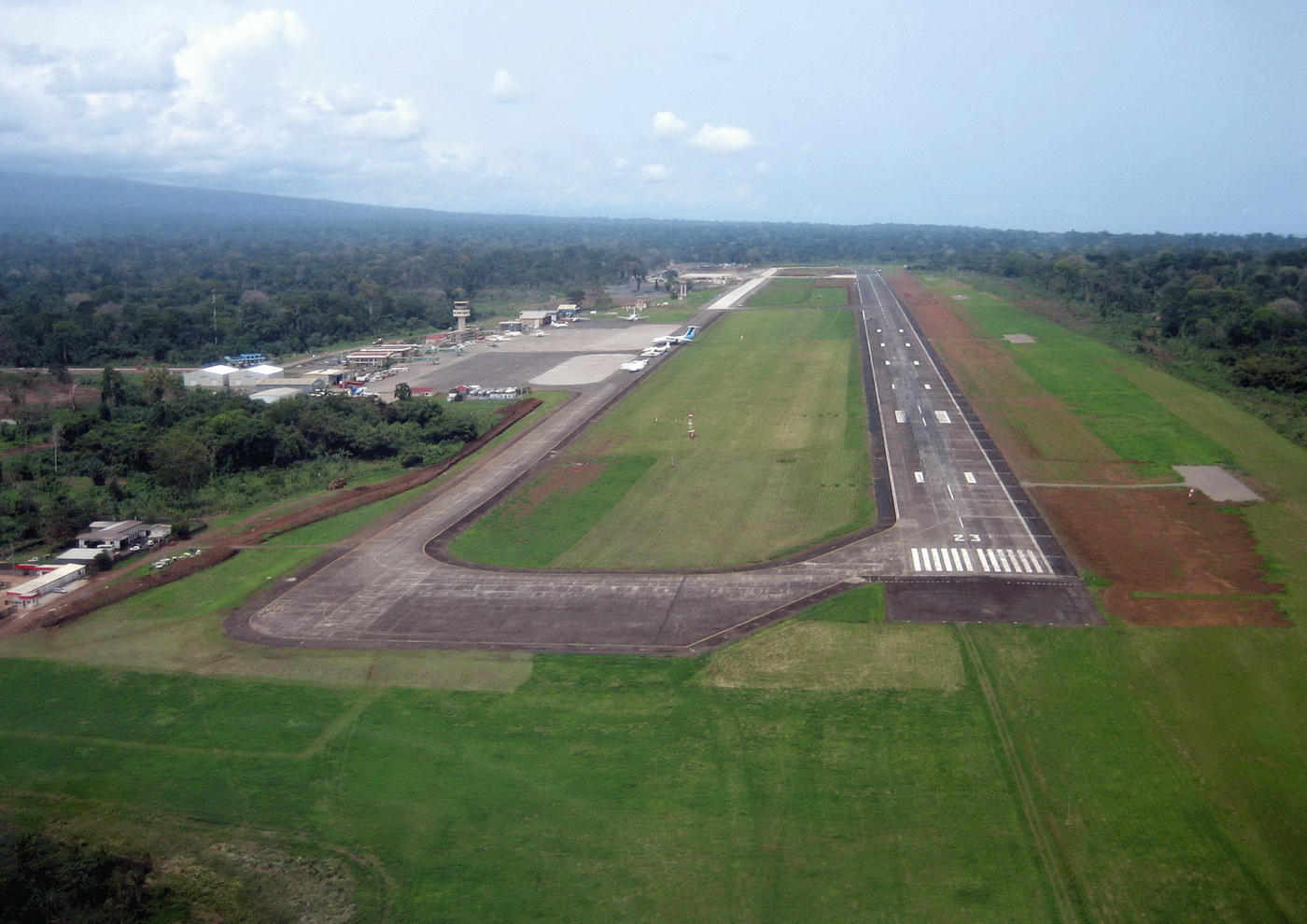
Malabo International Airport (Aeropuerto de Malabo in Spanish), en Punta Europa, island of Bioko

Infrastructure is generally old and in poor condition. As of 2002, surface transport is extremely limited, with little more than 700 kilometres of paved roads. The African Development Bank is helping to improve the paved roads from Malabo to Luba and Riaba; the Chinese are undertaking a project to link Mongomo to Bata on the mainland, and the European Union is financing an inter-states road network linking Equatorial Guinea to Cameroon and Gabon. Road maintenance is often inadequate.

Electricity is available in Equatorial Guinea's larger towns thanks to three small overworked hydropower facilities and a number of aged generators. In 1999, national production was about 13 MWh. In Malabo, the American company, CMS-Nomeco, built a 10 megawatt electricity plant financed by the government, which came in line in mid-2000, and plans to double capacity are advancing. This plant provides improved service to the capital, although there are still occasional outages. On the mainland the largest city, Bata, still has regular blackouts.

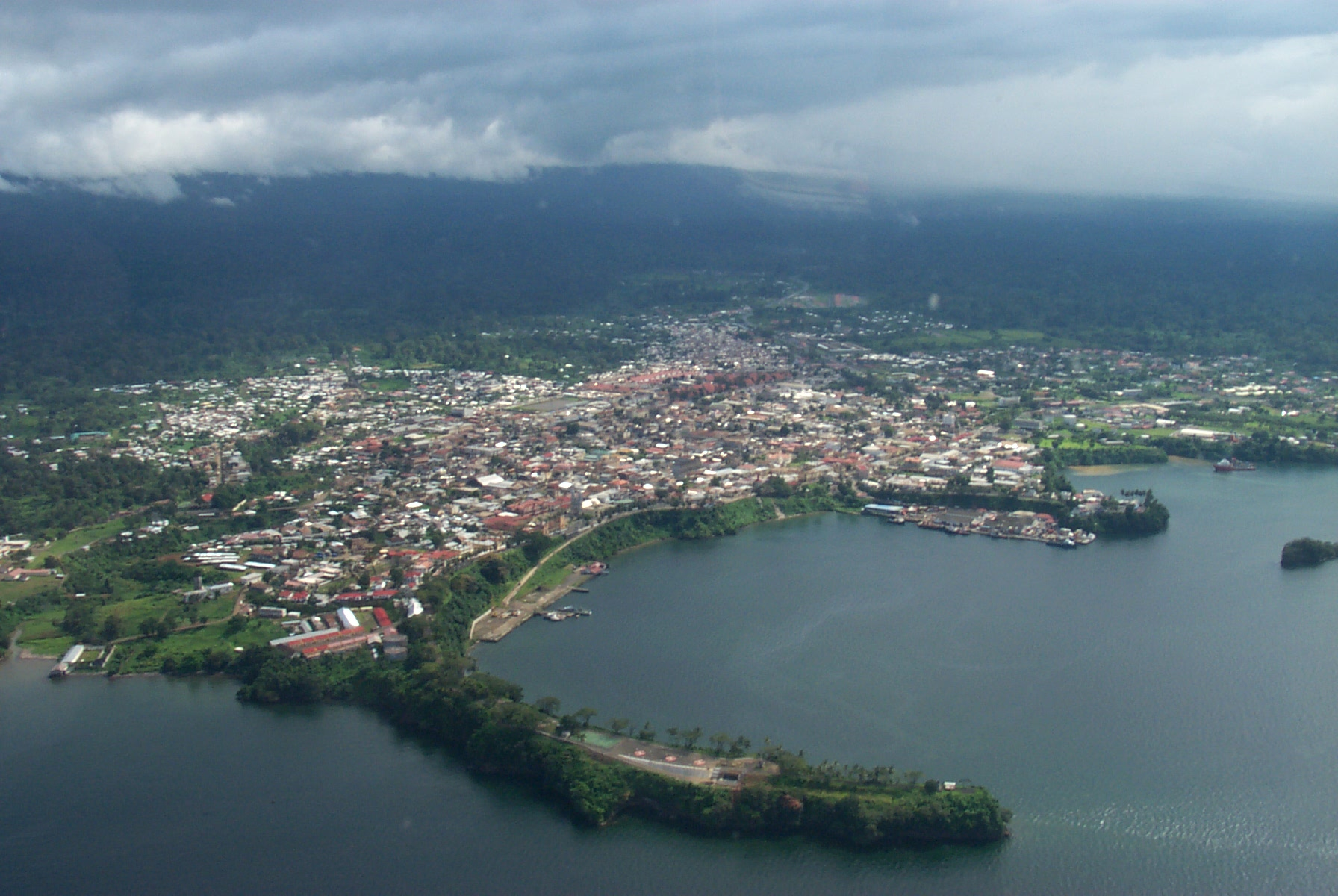
The port of Malabo

Water is only available in the major towns and is not always reliable because of poor maintenance and mismanagement. Some villages and rural areas are equipped with generators and water pumps, usually owned by private individuals.

Parastatal Getesa, a joint venture with a minority ownership stake held by a French subsidiary of Orange, provides telephone service in the major cities. The regular system is overextended, but Orange has introduced a popular GSM system, which is generally reliable in Malabo and Bata.

Equatorial Guinea has two of the deepest Atlantic seaports of the region, including the main business and commercial port city of Bata. The ports of both Malabo and Bata are severely overextended and require extensive rehabilitation and reconditioning. The British company, Incat, has an ongoing project with the government to renovate and expand Luba, the country's third-largest port which is located on Bioko Island. The government hopes Luba will become a major transportation hub for offshore oil and gas companies operating in the Gulf of Guinea. Luba is located some 50 kilometres from Malabo and had been virtually inactive except for minor fishing activities and occasional use to ease congestion in Malabo. A new jetty is also being built at km 5 on the way from Malabo to the airport. It is a project mainly supposed to service the oil industry, but can also relieve the congested Malabo Port due to its closeness. The Oil Jetty at km 5 was supposed to open the end of March 2003. Riaba is the other port of any scale on Bioko but is less active. The continental ports of Mbini and Cogo have deteriorated as well and are now used primarily for timber activities.

There are both air and sea connections between the two cities of Malabo and Bata. As of 2002, a few aging Soviet-built aircraft constituted the national air fleet. Since then, most Soviet-built aircraft have been replaced by ATR and Boeing. The runway at Malabo (3,200 m) is equipped with lights and can service aircraft similar to Boeing 777s and Ilyushin Il-76s. The one at Bata (2,400 m) does not operate at night but can accommodate aircraft as large as Boeing 737s. Their primary users are the national airline (EGA) and a private company (GEASA). Two minor airstrips (800 m) are located at Mongomo and Annobon. There are international connections out of Malabo to Madrid and Zürich in Europe and to Cotonou, Douala and Libreville in West Africa.

== Sectors ==
=== Energy developments ===
After a slow start, Equatorial Guinea has recently (as of 2002) emerged as a major oil producer in the Gulf of Guinea, one of the most promising hydrocarbon regions in the world. The main oil fields, Zafiro and Alba, both lie offshore of Bioko island. In 1999, oil production was about five times its 1996 level; Zafiro Field, operated by ExxonMobil and Ocean Energy, produced about 100,000 barrels per day (16,000 m^{3}/d), and CMS Nomeco extracted approximately 6,700 barrels per day (1,070 m^{3}/d). In 2002, production was nearly 200,000 barrels per day.

In 1995, Mobil (now ExxonMobil) discovered the large Zafiro field, with estimated reserves of 400,000,000 barrels (64,000,000 m^{3}). Production began in 1996. The company announced a 3-year U.S.$1bn rapid-development program to boost output to 130,000 barrels per day (21,000 m^{3}/d) by early 2001. Progress was delayed due to a contractual dispute with the government and by unexpectedly difficult geology. The difference with the government was eventually resolved.

In 1998, a more liberal regulatory and profit-sharing arrangement for hydrocarbon exploration and production activities was introduced. It revised and updated the production-sharing contract, which, until then, had favoured Western operators heavily. As a result, domestic oil receipts rose from 13% to 20% of oil export revenue. However, the government's share remains relatively poor by international standards.

In 1997, CMS Nomeco moved to expand its operation with a U.S.$300m methanol plant. The plant entered production in 2000 and helped boost natural gas condensate output from Alba field.

In August 1999, the government closed bidding on a new petroleum-licensing round for 53 unexplored deepwater blocks and seven shallow-water blocks. The response was small due to a combination of factors, including falling oil prices, restructuring within the oil industry, and uncertainty over an undemarcated maritime border with Nigeria (which was not resolved until 2000).

In late 1999, Triton Energy, a U.S. independent, discovered La Ceiba in block G in an entirely new area offshore the mainland of the country. Triton expected a U.S.$200m development program to enable La Ceiba and associated fields to produce 100,000 barrels per day (16,000 m^{3}/d) by late 2001, despite disappointments and technical problems at the beginning of the year.

With an upturn in oil prices, exploration intensified in 2000. In April 2000 U.S.-based Vanco Energy signed a production-sharing contract for the offshore block of Corisco Deep. In May 2000, Chevron was granted block L, offshore Río Muni, and a further three production-sharing contracts (for blocks J, I, and H) were signed with Atlas Petroleum, a Nigerian company.

In early 2001, the government announced plans to establish a national oil company, to allow Equatorial Guinea to take a greater stake in the sector and to facilitate the more rapid transfer of skills. However, critics fear that such a company may become a vehicle for opaque accounting and inertia of the sort that has hindered development in neighbouring countries including Angola, Cameroon, and Nigeria.

Since 2001, the government has created GEPetrol, a national oil company; and Sonagas, a national natural-gas company. The company EG LNG has been created to construct and operate the Bioko Island LNG plant and terminal. The plant began to operate in May 2007 and a second plant is now under development.

Equatorial Guinea became a member of the OPEC cartel in May 2017.

=== Agriculture ===
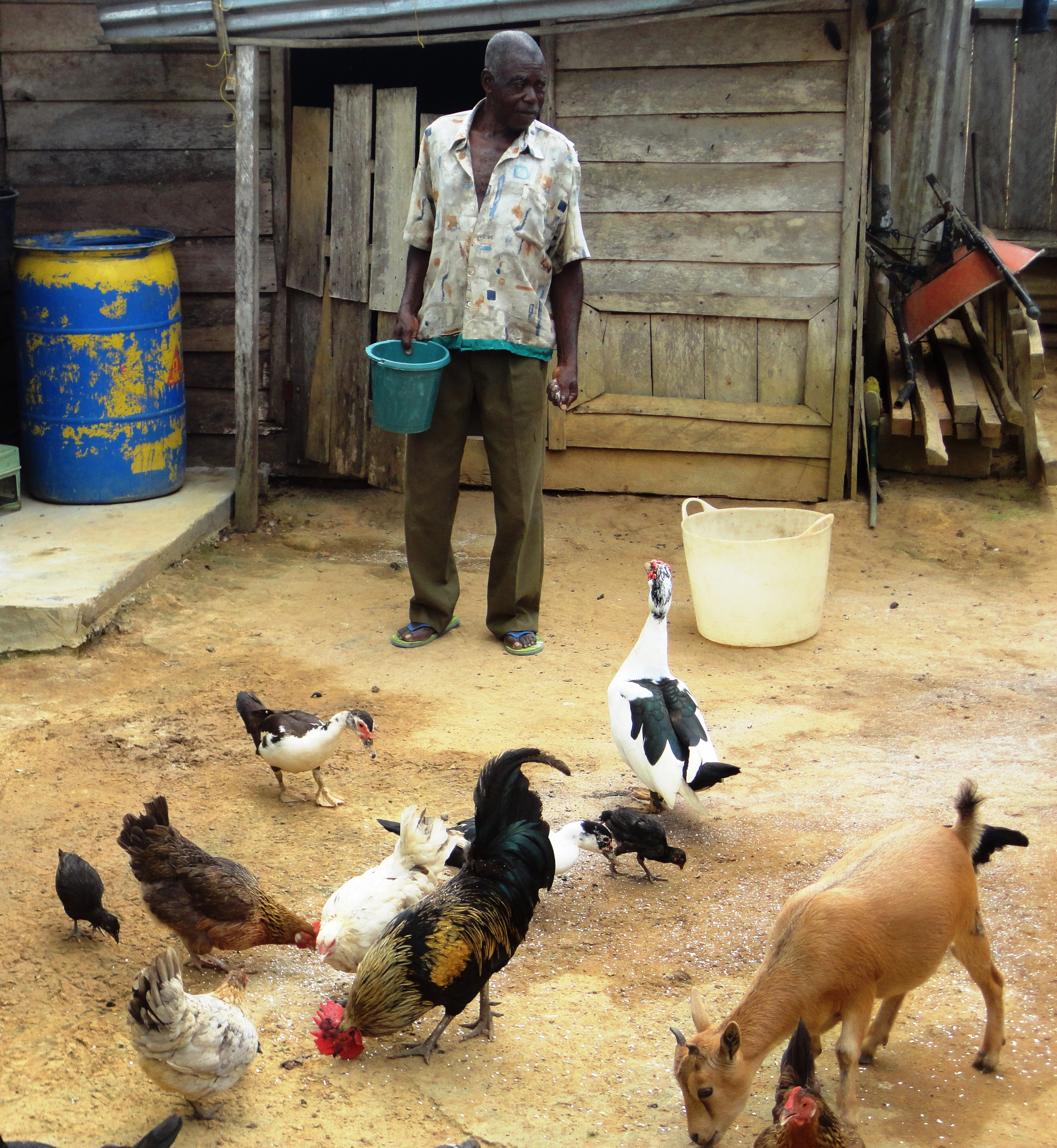
A farm in Equatorial Guinea.

Agriculture is a major sector of the economy in Equatorial Guinea. Farming accounts for approximately 2% of GDP as it contributes little to the export earnings of the country. In 2022, the Food and Agriculture Organization of the United Nations held its Africa regional conference in Malabo. One popular crop is Tabernanthe iboga which is used for traditional tribal medicine. The island of Bioko has a greater variety of tropical vegetation, including mangroves than the mainland.

The Government of Equatorial Guinea has used agriculture as a way to promote economic diversity. In 2021, crop production index for Equatorial Guinea was 102.2 index, growing at an average annual rate of 1.23%.

=== Mining ===
The regulation of mining in Equatorial Guinea is handled by the Ministry of Mines, Industry, and Energy, which oversees activities in the mining and petroleum industries.

Petroleum exploration and production is the core of Equatorial Guinea's economy, and accounts for over 90 percent of Equatorial Guinea's national income. As a result, little attention has been given to exploring and making use of the country's mineral resources; There is no commercial mining, although there are minor gold mining operations. The Equatoguinean government has conducted preliminary explorations that they believe show potential mining opportunities for diamonds and coltan., and the Ministry of Mines is now promoting the country's mining potential in hopes of attracting investors

Historically, the peoples of Equatorial Guinea produced gold and iron before being colonized by Spain. During colonial rule, there were no commercial mining operations. Following independence in 1968, Soviet and French geologists found potential deposits of gold, bauxite, tin, tungsten, and coltan. Additional surveys conducted by GEMSA, a Spanish-Equatoguinean joint venture, and UMCEG (Ocean Energy, previously named United Meridian Corporation) performed airborne and land surveys, as well as the creation of GIS databases.

The government claims ownership of all mineral resources, and regulates them under law 9/2006 (replacing the former Mining Law, 9/1981).

== Macroeconomic statistics ==
Exports of Equatorial Guinea by product category (2019) Chemical products Transportation Machines Mineral products Plastics and rubbers Metals Foodstuffs Precious metals Textiles Instruments Animal products Vegetable products Paper goods Footwear and headwear Miscellaneous Stone and glass Wood products Animal and vegetable bi-products Animal hides Arts and antiques Weapons

=== Main indicators ===
The following table shows the main economic indicators in 1980–2026. Inflation below 5% is in green.

Year	GDP			GDP growth (real)	Inflation	Government debt (% of GDP)
Year	Total (bil. US$ PPP)	Per capita (US$ PPP)	Total (bil. US$ nominal)	GDP growth (real)	Inflation	Government debt (% of GDP)
1980	0.1	335	0.0	▲4.8	▲0.0	▲146.2
1985	0.1	▲398	▲0.1	▲12.9	▲84.0	▲183.8
1990	▲0.2	▲414	0.1	▲2.5	▲0.9	▼157.0
1995	▲0.4	▲848	▲0.2	▲26.5	▲19.9	▼136.9
2000	▲5.8	▲9515	▲1.2	▲110.5	▲4.8	▼36.6
2005	▲20.3	▲26759	▲8.2	▲8.2	▲5.6	▼2.8
2006	▲22.2	▲28083	▲10.1	▲6.5	▲4.5	▼1.2
2007	▲26.3	▲31764	▲13.1	▲15.3	▲2.8	▼0.8
2008	▲31.6	▲36422	▲19.8	▲17.8	▲4.7	▼0.5
2009	▲32.3	▼35476	▼15.1	▲1.3	▲5.7	▲4.3
2010	▼29.7	▼31259	▲16.3	▼ -8.9	▲5.3	▲7.9
2011	▲32.3	▲32509	▲21.4	▲6.5	▲4.8	▼7.2
2012	▲35.7	▲34337	▲22.4	▲8.3	▲3.4	▼7.1
2013	▼34.8	▼32083	▼21.9	▼ -4.1	▲3.2	▼6.3
2014	▲35.5	▼31452	▼21.8	▲0.4	▲4.3	▲12.6
2015	▼32.6	▼27724	▼13.2	▼ -9.1	▲1.7	▲31.7
2016	▼30.0	▼24557	▼11.2	▼ -8.8	▲1.4	▲41.1
2017	▼28.8	▼22720	▲12.2	▼ -5.7	▲0.7	▼36.2
2018	▲30.2	▲23009	▲13.3	▼ -6.2	▲1.3	▲40.6
2019	▼27.5	▼20202	▼11.4	▼ -5.5	▲1.2	▲43.2
2020	▼23.5	▼16694	▼9.9	▼ -4.8	▲4.8	▲49.4
2021	▲29.6	▲20371	▲12.2	▲0.9	▲ -0.1	▼42.3
2022	▲32.7	▲21832	▲13.7	▲3.2	▲4.9	▼29.8
2023	▼32.2	▼20849	▼12.3	▼ -5.1	▲2.4	▲39.1
2024	▲33.3	▲20930	▲12.8	▲0.9	▲3.4	▼36.4
2025	▼32.1	▼19585	▼12.5	▼ -6.4	▲2.8	▲40.6
2026	32.1	▼19061	▲13.7	▼ -2.7	▲3.2	▼39.1

=== Other indicators ===
Investment (gross fixed)
46.3% (2005 est.)
Industries
Petroleum, fishing, sawmilling, natural gas
Industrial production growth rate
30% (2002 est.)
Electricity – production
29.43 GWh (2005)
Electricity – consumption
27.37 GWh (2005)
Agriculture – products
Coffee, cocoa, rice, yams, cassava (tapioca), bananas, palm oil nuts; livestock; timber
Exchange rates
Communauté financière africaine francs (CFAF) per US$1 – 480.56 (2005), 528.29 (2004), 581.2 (2003), 696.99 (2002), 733.04 (2001)

== See also ==
- United Nations Economic Commission for Africa
- Minister of Finance (Equatorial Guinea)
- United Nations Economic Commission for Africa
