= 2025 in Equatorial Guinea =

- Decades: 2000s; 2010s; 2020s
- See also: Other events of 2025; Timeline of Equatoguinean history

Events in the year 2025 in Equatorial Guinea.

== Incumbents ==
- President: Teodoro Obiang Nguema Mbasogo
- Prime Minister: Manuel Osa Nsue Nsua
- Vice President: Teodoro Nguema Obiang Mangue

== Events ==
- 19 May – The International Court of Justice rules in favor of Equatorial Guinea's claims to the islands of Mbanie, Cocotier, and Conga, which have been occupied by Gabon since 1972.
- 4 June – US President Donald Trump issues a proclamation barring Equatoguinean nationals from entering the United States.
- 28 August – Baltasar Ebang Engonga, nephew of President Obiang, is sentenced to eight years in prison and fined $220,000 for embezzlement.
- 12 September – The International Court of Justice rules in favor of the French government selling a luxury mansion in Paris that was seized in 2012 from Equatorial Guinea during a corruption investigation against vice president Teodoro Nguema Obiang Mangue.
- 27 September – Bioko island is designated as a biosphere reserve by UNESCO.

== Holidays ==
- 1 January: New Year's Day
- 18 April: Good Friday
- 1 May: Labour Day
- 5 June: President's Day
- 19 June: Corpus Christi
- 3 August: Freedom Day
- 15 August: Constitution Day
- 12 October: Independence Day
- 8 December: Immaculate Conception
- 25 December: Christmas Day
