= 2027 in Equatorial Guinea =

- Decades: 2000s; 2010s; 2020s
- See also: Other events of 2027; Timeline of Equatoguinean history

Events in the year 2027 in Equatorial Guinea.

== Events ==
=== Predicted and scheduled ===
- By November – 2027 Equatorial Guinean parliamentary election

== Holidays ==
- 1 January – New Year's Day
- 26 March – Good Friday
- 1 May – Labour Day
- 27 May – Corpus Christi
- 5 June – President's Day
- 3 August – Freedom Day
- 15 August – Constitution Day
- 12 October – Independence Day
- 8 December – Immaculate Conception
- 25 December – Christmas Day
