= 2010s in Equatorial Guinea =

The following lists events that happened during the 2010s in Equatorial Guinea.

== Incumbents ==
- President: Teodoro Obiang Nguema Mbasogo
- Prime Minister:
  - Ignacio Milam Tang (until 21 May 2012)
  - Vicente Ehate Tomi (21 May 2012 – 23 June 2016)
  - Francisco Pascual Obama Asue (from 23 June 2016)
- First Vice President:
  - Ignacio Milam Tang (21 May 2012 – 22 June 2016)
  - Teodoro Nguema Obiang Mangue (from 22 June 2016)
- Second Vice President:
  - Teodoro Nguema Obiang Mangue (21 May 2012 – 22 June 2016)
  - vacant (from 22 June 2016)

== Events ==
=== 2010 ===
- 16 June – UNESCO freezes an award funded and named after Obiang Nguema Mbasogo following opposition from human rights groups.

=== 2011 ===
- 1 July – An African Union summit is held in Malabo with many leaders showing annoyance to the NATO intervention in Libya due to fears of the situation becoming worse.
- 13 November – 2011 Equatorial Guinean constitutional referendum: changes to the constitution of Equatorial Guinea are approved with 97.7% of the vote. The changes allow incumbent president Teodoro Obiang Nguema Mbasogo to run for two additional terms, as well as establishing a bicameral legislature and improving the judicial system. International observers criticised the conduct of the election, with widespread voter intimidation, ballot stuffing, and threats made against opposition leaders reported.

=== 2012 ===
- 21 January – The 28th African Cup of Nations in Bata.
- 28 March – Two French judges give an arrest warrant for Teodorin Obiang, son of president Teodoro Obiang Nguema Mbasago, for alleged real estate fraud.
- 11 October – The Djibloho Dam is officially inaugurated.
- 22 October – Human rights lawyer Fabián Nsue is arrested and detained. He is released without charge on 30 October alongside three other prisoners.
- 27 October – A French court sentences Teodorin Obiang in absentia to a 3-year suspended jail sentence and a €30 million suspended fine. His assets in France are seized.
- 13–14 December – The Organisation of African, Caribbean and Pacific States holds its 7th summit in Malabo.

=== 2013 ===
- 26 May – 2013 Equatorial Guinean parliamentary election.

=== 2014 ===
- 11 October – A United States federal court orders Teodoro Nguema Obiang to hand over roughly US$30 million in assets that the United States Department of Justice alleged was obtained illegally through corrupt business deals.

=== 2015 ===
- 5 February – Equatorial Guinea and Ghana supporters violently clash during an Africa Cup of Nations semi-final match. 14 Ghana fans were hospitalised, and the Equatorial Guinea federation was fined US$100,000 and ordered to cover the treatment costs of injured fans.

=== 2016 ===
- 24 April – 2016 Equatorial Guinean presidential election: Obiang is re-elected with 93.7% of the vote, from a turnout of 92.9%.

=== 2017 ===
- 4–13 August – Equatorial Guinea at the 2017 World Championships in Athletics
- December – Equatoguinean security forces allegedly thwart a coup attempt by mercenaries who wanted to cross the Cameroon–Equatorial Guinea border.

=== 2018 ===
- 26 May – season start of the 2018 Equatoguinean Primera División (the top-tier football league)

=== 2019 ===
- 2018–19 Equatoguinean Primera División
- August – Equatorial Guinea at the 2019 African Games

== Deaths ==
- 6 December 2012 – Miguel Abia Biteo Boricó, 51, politician
- 4 March 2013 – Eulogio Oyó, politician.
- 8 July 2013 – Rincón, 33, Brazilian-born Equatorial Guinean footballer.
- 16 June 2014 – Cándido Muatetema Rivas, 54, politician and former prime minister
- 1 July 2017 – Ibra Agbo, footballer (b. 1987).
- 1 July 2018 – Anacleto Sima Ngua, Roman Catholic prelate, Bishop of Bata (b. 1936).
- 5 May 2019 – Antonio Mba Nguema, politician
- 10 October 2019 – Trinidad Morgades Besari, 88, writer.
