= Top Charts Africa =

African Digital Platform

- Founder: Saliu Momoh
- Founded: 2020
- Based in: Lagos
- Language: English
- Website: Official website

Top Charts Africa is a digital media platform established in 2020 by Saliu Momoh. The platform is focused on showcasing African pop culture, entertainment, and social influence through various segments, including the monthly Top Charts Africa Magazine, the Social Charts, the annual 100 Most Influential People List, and the NXT Honors awards.

== History ==
Top Charts Africa was founded in 2020 aimed at spotlighting and celebrating Africans in entertainment and pop culture. The platform became known for its Social Charts, a weekly ranking system that tracks the most talked about African personalities based on social media and google analytics.

== Magazine ==
Top Charts Africa is also known for its magazine, Top Charts Africa Magazine. It is a quarterly digital publication that delves deep into the African entertainment scene. Each issue features exclusive interviews, insightful articles, and analysis of trends in African pop culture. Some notable persons that have featured in the Magazine include Joeboy, BNXN, Musa Keys Deyemi Okanlawon,Tarina Patel and Sharon Ooja. The Magazine also has a subdivision in South Africa called "Top Charts South Africa Magazine" which has featured Big Brother Titans 2023 winner, Khosi Twala.

== Social charts ==
Top Charts Africa's Social Charts provide real-time rankings of influential African personalities based on social media engagement and public discourse. Utilizing Google and Social media analytics. In May 2023, personalities such as Hilda Baci, Seun Kuti, and Tony Elumelu topped the African Social Chart. In 2024, Wizkid, Baltasar Engonga, President William Ruto and Davido topped the list of the most talked about people.

== 100 most influential people ==
Annually, Top Charts Africa publishes the 100 Most Influential People List, the list includes individuals who have made substantial contributions across various sectors. The 2023 list featured notable figures such as Nasser Goulamhoussen, Oke Umurhohwo

== NXT honors ==
Top Charts Africa launched the NXT Honors to celebrate outstanding African talent and excellence in various fields. In the 2023 edition, individuals like Don Jazzy, Ayra Starr were awarded. In 2024, Deola Art Alade, was appointed chairperson of the Award selection committee
