= 1979 in Equatorial Guinea =

- Decades: 1950s; 1960s; 1970s; 1980s; 1990s
- See also: Other events of 1979; Timeline of Equatoguinean history

The following lists events that happened during 1979 in the Republic of Equatorial Guinea.

== Incumbents ==
- President: Francisco Macías Nguema (till 3 August)
- President: Teodoro Obiang Nguema Mbasogo (from 3 August)
- Vice President: Bonifacio Nguema Esono Nchama (till 3 August)
- First Vice President: Florencio Mayé Elá (from 3 August)
- Second Vice President: Salvador Elá Nseng (from 3 August)

== Events ==
- 3 August – Dictator Francisco Macías Nguema of Equatorial Guinea was overthrown in a bloody coup d'état led by his nephew, Teodoro Obiang
- 18 August – Ousted dictator Francisco Macías Nguema is captured near his home village of Mongomo.
- 23 August – The first ministerial cabinet of the Supreme Military Council was constituted, composed of eleven members:
- 29 September – Francisco Macías Nguema and six other defendants were convicted of genocide, embezzlement and treason, and were executed by a firing squad of soldiers from Morocco.
- 31 October – For the first time since 1971, a cooperation agreement and a protocol of action was signed between Spain and Equatorial Guinea, followed on 5 December by a financial cooperation agreement, and two protocols.

== Births ==
- 20 November – Miguel Mba, footballer with 4 caps for Equatorial Guinea

== See also ==
- Francisco Pascual Obama Asue
- 2004 Equatorial Guinea coup d'état attempt
