= Spanish Technical Aid Response Team =

Medical team rapidly deployed to humanitarian crises

The Spanish Technical Aid Response Team (START) is a team of public health professionals and support personnel that is prepared to deploy within 72 hours to a humanitarian crisis anywhere in the world. The team is also known as the Red Vests due to the red vests worn by its members while in the field.

Organized by the Humanitarian Action Office of the Spanish Agency for International Development Cooperation (AECID), START was certified as a specialized team by the World Health Organization (WHO) on 31 May 2018 as part of its Emergency Medical Team (EMT) initiative. START is classified as an EMT II team, able to provide primary care as well as surgical support and hospitalization.

START was first deployed in 2019 to Dondo, Mozambique, in response to the humanitarian emergency caused by Cyclone Idai. In Mozambique, the team deployed a field hospital about the size of a football pitch.

The team was also part of the Spanish humanitarian response to the unplanned explosions at a munitions site in Bata, Equatorial Guinea in early 2021.
