= Besari =

Besari is a surname. Notable people with the surname include:

- Fiersa Besari
- Trinidad Morgades Besari
- Hasri Ainun Besari

== See also ==
- B'sari or besari
