= 2024 in Equatorial Guinea =

- Decades: 2000s; 2010s; 2020s
- See also: Other events of 2024; Timeline of Equatoguinean history

Events in the year 2024 in Equatorial Guinea.

== Incumbents ==
- President: Teodoro Obiang Nguema Mbasogo
- Prime Minister: Manuela Roka Botey (until 17 August), Manuel Osa Nsue Nsua (starting 17 August)
- Vice President: Teodoro Nguema Obiang Mangue

== Events ==
- 20 July: The government suspends Internet and telephone coverage on the island of Annobón, drawing condemnation from the Unrepresented Nations and Peoples Organization.
- 30 September: The International Court of Justice begins hearings on a territorial dispute between Equatorial Guinea and Gabon over the ownership of the islands of Mbanie, Cocotier, and Conga, which have been occupied by Gabon since 1972.
- 5 November: Baltasar Ebang Engonga, the Director General of the National Financial Investigation Agency, is arrested after raids on his home in office reveal more than 400 explicit videos with involving the wives of prominent government personalities and a sister of President Teodoro Obiang Nguema Mbasogo.

== Holidays ==
- January 1: New Year's Day
- March 29: Good Friday
- May 1: Labour Day
- May 30: Corpus Christi
- June 5: President's Day
- August 3: Freedom Day
- August 15: Constitution Day
- October 12: Independence Day
- December 8: Immaculate Conception
- December 25: Christmas Day
