= Ángela Nzambi =

Equatoguinean writer (born 1971)

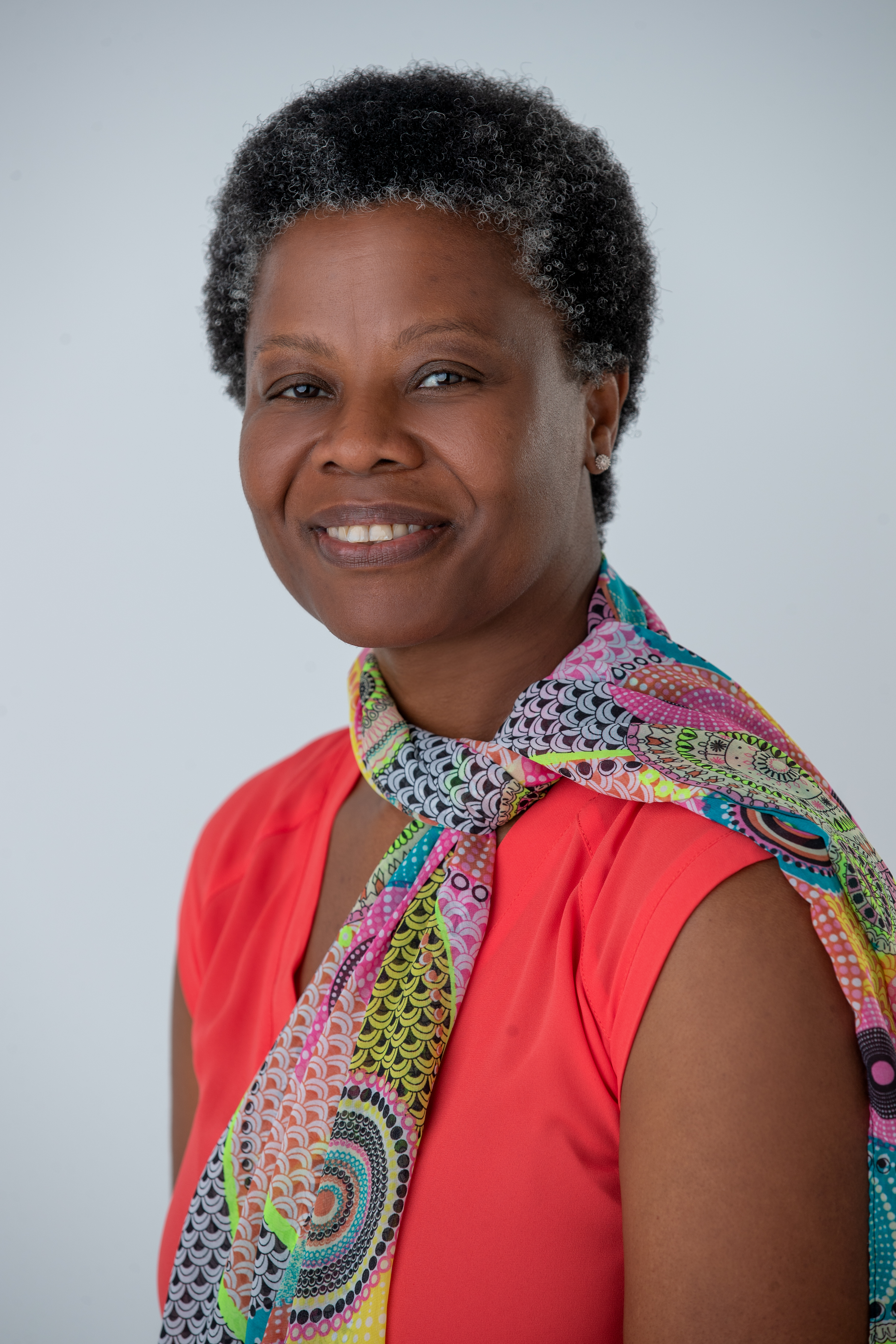
- Nzambi in 2014
- Born: Ángela María Nzambi Bakale; 7 October 1971 (age 53); Lia, Bata, Equatorial Guinea

Ángela María Nzambi Bakale (born 7 October 1971) is an Equatorial Guinean writer, feminist and human rights activist based in Valencia, Spain. She has published three books: Ngulsi (2012), Biyaare (2015) and Mayimbo (2019); the later receiving the International Justo Bolekia Boleká Prize for African Literature in 2019.

== Biography ==
Ángela Nzambi was born in Lia, a suburb of Bata in Equatorial Guinea. She studied at Carlos Lwanga High School in Bata and Rey Malabo High School in Malabo. She started her higher education at the National School of Agriculture (ENA) in Malabo, and then moved to the University of Valencia to study Business Science. Subsequently, she spent time in Houston at the University of St. Thomas for a course entitled “Literacy Initiative for Today”.

She is the daughter of Fortunato Nzambi Machinde, who was Minister of State for Education, First Vice President of the Senate in the last legislature, and Vice President of the MAO, collaborating with the dictatorial regime of Guinea.

She currently works as manager of volunteering and impact for the NGO Spanish Commission for Refugee Assistance (CEAR). She is also a member of the Citizen Council of the Valencian branch of the Podemos political party.

== Writings ==
Nzambi published her first book, Ngulsi, in 2012. Her narrative in this work is taken from the oral tradition. It is based on the reinterpretation of some stories, which came partly from her education in Equatorial Guinea and were told by the "karichobo" (matrilineal kin) of her ethnic group, the Bisao.

Afterward, she participated in two collective literary works: Navidad dulce, Navidad (Nativity, Sweet Nativity, 2012) and 23 Relatos sin Fronteras (23 Stories without Borders, 2015).

Her second book, Biyaare (Stars) was published in 2015. Taking an essay style, mixed with a characteristic narrative style inspired by the oral tradition, Nzambi reflects on people who "shone like stars," that had encouraged her during her professional activity as a cultural activist.

Her third book, Mayimbo (Wanderings) won the International Justo Bolekia Boleká Prize for African Literature in 2019. It blurs the lines between past and present, Africa and Spain, and takes as a background the inner world of a citizen of both countries.

Nzambi is an advocate of racialised feminism - the recognition of equal rights within feminism from the perspective of a black woman, in the face of the "double stigma" of being both a woman and a black person.

Nzambi has campaigned actively on migrant issues in Spain. She has also participated in several Conferences, noticing: “III Foro Mundial de Migraciones, organized by CEAR –the Spanish NGO for help for Refugees– in Madrid; and “Africa y los pueblos de ascendencia africana: problematicas actuals y acciones para el future”, organized by Howard University, in Washington DC.
