= Charleswood =

Charleswood may refer to:

- Charleswood, Winnipeg, a community in the city of Winnipeg, Manitoba, Canada
- Charleswood (electoral district), a former provincial electoral district in Manitoba, Canada, centred on and named after the above neighbourhood
- Charleswood, Calgary, a neighbourhood of Calgary, Alberta, Canada
