= Mining industry of Equatorial Guinea =

The regulation of mining in Equatorial Guinea is handled by the Ministry of Mines, Industry, and Energy, which oversees activities in the mining and petroleum industries.

Petroleum exploration and production is the core of Equatorial Guinea's economy, and accounts for over 90 percent of Equatorial Guinea's national income. As a result, little attention has been given to exploring and making use of the country's mineral resources; There is no commercial mining, although there are minor gold mining operations. The Equatoguinean government has conducted preliminary explorations that they believe show potential mining opportunities for diamonds and coltan., and the Ministry of Mines is now promoting the country's mining potential in hopes of attracting investors

Historically, the peoples of Equatorial Guinea produced gold and iron before being colonized by Spain. During colonial rule, there were no commercial mining operations. Following independence in 1968, Soviet and French geologists found potential deposits of gold, bauxite, tin, tungsten, and coltan. Additional surveys conducted by GEMSA, a Spanish-Equatoguinean joint venture, and UMCEG (Ocean Energy, previously named United Meridian Corporation) performed airborne and land surveys, as well as the creation of GIS databases.

The government claims ownership of all mineral resources, and regulates them under law 9/2006 (replacing the former Mining Law, 9/1981).

== Gold ==
Artisans using placer mining techniques retrieve gold from rivers in Río Muni, primarily the areas of Cogo, Aconibe and Mongomo. The Equatoguinean government believes that at least 2.3 tons of gold were collectively produced from these small operations.

In 2006, the United States Geological Survey reported that about 200 kg of gold were produced in Equatorial Guinea.

== Diamond ==
Indicators of diamond deposits in Gabon extend to the southern border of Rio Muni, and the Equatorial government believes surveys may show the potential for diamond deposits in southeastern Rio Muni.

== Coltan ==
The government reports that evidence of the presence of coltan (columbite-tantalite, a tantalum ore) has been found near Aconibe and Akamiken. Very little exploration work has been performed in these areas, however.
