= Regina Mañe Ela =

Equatorial Guinean politician (1954–2015)

Minister for Education and Culture of Equatorial Guinea government-in-exile
- In office 2003–2015
- Prime Minister: Severo Moto Nsá

Personal details
- Born: 8 December 1954 Bata, Equatorial Guinea
- Died: 24 February 2015 (aged 60) Spain

Regina Mañe Ela (8 December 1954 – 24 February 2015) was an Equatorial Guinean politician and opposition campaigner.

== Life ==
Ela was born in Bata on 8 December 1954. Ela was a teacher first at a primary school, and from 1970 at the National Institute of Secondary Education. She was sacked from the latter position in 1994 for her membership of the opposition Progress Party of Equatorial Guinea.

Ela was secretary of social action for the Rio Miuni Geographic Council and was elected mayor of Bata for the Progress Party on 17 September 1995. The governing Democratic Party of Equatorial Guinea disputed the results and claimed victory. President Teodoro Obiang gave the mayoralty to one of his supporters.

Ela fled the country to seek asylum in Spain in 1997; this was granted and she lived in Valencia for more than 15 years. In 2003 she was appointed Minister for Education and Culture in Severo Moto Nsá's government-in-exile formed in Madrid by the People's Party, Popular Action of Equatorial Guinea, and the Liberty Party. She was the only female member of the cabinet and was known within the People's Party as "madre" ("mother").

Ela's son also applied for asylum in Spain and was initially refused, having to briefly return to Equatorial Guinea. He appealed to the Supreme Court of Spain and was successful in having the original decision overturned and being accepted as a refugee.

Ela was tried in absentia in Equatorial Guinea and was sentenced to 20 years in prison for treason, 15 years for conspiracy against the head of state and 15 years for conspiracy against the government. Ela denied knowledge of a coup d'etat for Equatorial Guinea that was allegedly planned in Spain and weapons intended for the coup which were seized by the Spanish government at the port of Sagunt. Ela died of cancer on 24 February 2015.
