= Ricardo Mangue Obama Nfubea =

Equatoguinean politician (born 1961)

Ricardo Mangue
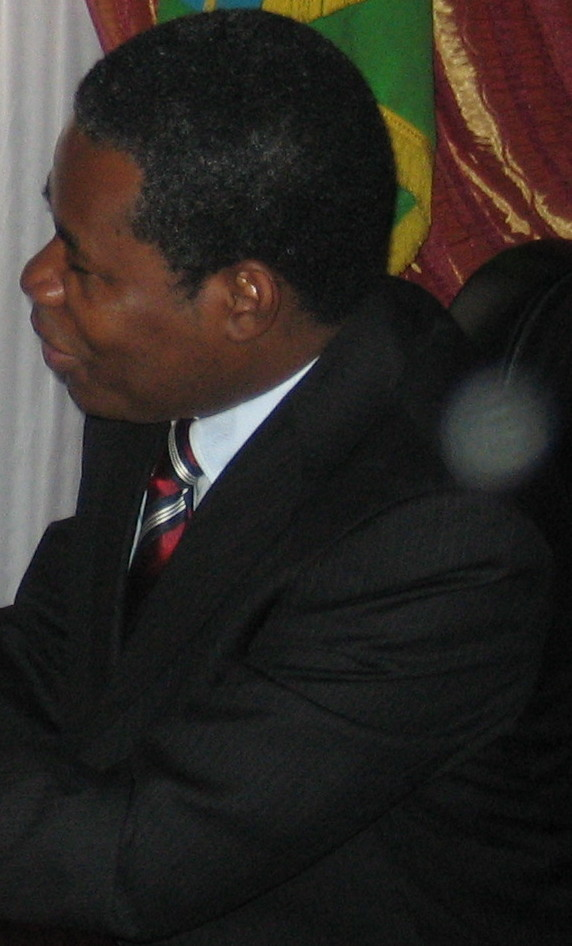
- Mangue in 2008

Prime Minister of Equatorial Guinea
- In office 14 August 2006 – 8 July 2008
- President: Teodoro Obiang
- Preceded by: Miguel Abia Biteo
- Succeeded by: Ignacio Milam Tang

Personal details
- Born: Ricardo Mangue Obama Nfubea; 1961 (age 64–65)
- Party: PDGE

Ricardo Mangue Obama Nfubea (born c. 1961) is an Equatoguinean politician and a member of PDGE. He was Prime Minister from 2006 to 2008. He is a lawyer by profession.

Mangue has worked as President Teodoro Obiang's lawyer. In the government named on 11 February 2003, he was appointed Minister of State in charge of the Civil Service and Administrative Coordination. He was Second Deputy Prime Minister in the government of Prime Minister Miguel Abia Biteo, and also previously held the labor and education portfolios. Following the resignation of Abia Biteo and his government on 10 August 2006, Mangue was appointed prime minister by President Obiang on 14 August 2006, becoming the first member of the majority Fang community to serve in this post.

On 4 July 2008, Mangue resigned along with his entire government, stating that his government had been "unable to achieve the wishes of His Excellency, the President of the Republic, to make our country a developed and prosperous one". Speaking on television afterward, Obiang criticized Mangue's government as "one of the worst ever formed", going so far as to say that some members of the government had attempted to destabilize Equatorial Guinea, and he asserted that it would be necessary to "change the entire government". Ignacio Milam Tang was appointed to succeed Mangue on July 8.

Political offices
Preceded by Miguel Abia Biteo	Prime Minister of Equatorial Guinea; 2006–2008	Succeeded by Ignacio Milam Tang
