= COVID-19 vaccination in Equatorial Guinea =

Plan to immunize against COVID-19

- Date: February 15, 2021 – present
- Location: Equatorial Guinea
- Cause: COVID-19 pandemic
- Participants: 293,702 total doses administered

COVID-19 vaccination in Equatorial Guinea is an ongoing immunisation campaign against severe acute respiratory syndrome coronavirus 2 (SARS-CoV-2), the virus that causes coronavirus disease 2019 (COVID-19), in response to the ongoing pandemic in the country.

Equatorial Guinea began its vaccination program on 15 February 2021, initially with 100,000 doses of the Sinopharm BIBP vaccine donated by China.

== History ==
=== Timeline ===
==== February 2021 ====
On 11 February 2021, 100,000 donated doses of the Sinopharm BIBP vaccine arrived in Equatorial Guinea from China.

==== March 2021 ====
By the end of the month 9,265 doses had been administered.

==== April 2021 ====
By the end of the month 55,799 doses had been administered. 8,389 persons had been fully vaccinated.

==== May 2021 ====
By the end of the month 219,677 doses had been administered. 71,598 persons had been fully vaccinated.

==== June 2021 ====
On 16 June 2021, Equatorial Guinea buys 500,000 doses of the Sinopharm BIBP vaccine. By the end of the month 260,528 doses had been administered. 111,343 persons had been fully vaccinated.

==== July 2021 ====
By the end of the month 301,413 doses had been administered. 122,500 persons had been fully vaccinated.

==== August 2021 ====
By the end of the month 331,807 doses had been administered. 141,326 persons had been fully vaccinated.

==== September 2021 ====
By the end of the month 397,083 doses had been administered. 167,635 persons had been fully vaccinated.

==== October 2021 ====
By the end of the month 426,780 doses had been administered. 186,670 persons (32% of the target population) had been fully vaccinated.

==== November 2021 ====
By the end of the month 443,135 doses had been administered. 196,616 persons (34% of the target population) had been fully vaccinated.

==== December 2021 ====
By the end of the month 452,572 doses had been administered. 203,357 persons (35% of the target population) had been fully vaccinated.

==== February 2022 ====
By the end of the month 463,549 doses had been administered. 206,023 persons had been fully vaccinated.

==== March 2022 ====
By the end of the month 473,409 doses had been administered. 210,706 persons had been fully vaccinated.

==== April 2022 ====
By the end of the month 479,991 doses had been administered. 214,486 persons had been fully vaccinated.

== Progress ==
Cumulative vaccinations in Equatorial Guinea

View source data.
