= Torre de La Libertad =

Monument in Bata, Equatorial Guinea

Coordinates: 1.8704°N 9.770°E

Daytime view of monument

The Torre de la Libertad is a monument located in the city of Bata in the continental region of the African country of Equatorial Guinea. It was inaugurated on October 12 of 2011 in the celebrations for the independence of the nation. It is located on a promenade next to the river. The structure consists of a tower that changes colors at night due to a lighting system. Among other attractions is a revolving restaurant, which is located at the top.

Monument at night
