= Charleswood, Calgary =

Charleswood
- Neighbourhood
- Location of Charleswood in Calgary
- Coordinates: 51°05′08″N 114°06′44″W
- Country: Canada
- Province: Alberta
- City: Calgary
- Quadrant: NW
- Ward: 4
- Established: 1959

Government
  - Mayor: Jeromy Farkas
  - Administrative body: Calgary City Council
  - Councillor: DJ Kelly (The Calgary Party)

Area
  - Total: 2.3 km^{2} (0.89 sq mi)
- Elevation: 1,105 m (3,625 ft)

Population (2006)
  - Total: 3,503
  - Average Income: $63,828
- Website: Triwood Community Association

Charleswood is a residential neighbourhood in the northwest quadrant of Calgary, Alberta. It is located east of Crowchild Trail and the University of Calgary. It borders the Nose Hill Park to the north and the Confederation Park to the southeast.

Charleswood is represented in the Calgary City Council by the Ward 4 councillor.

== Demographics ==
In the City of Calgary's 2012 municipal census, Charleswood had a population of 3,421 living in 1,494 dwellings, a 1.9% increase from its 2011 population of 3,357. With a land area of 1.8 km^{2} (0.69 sq mi), it had a population density of 1,900/km^{2} (4,920/sq mi) in 2012.

Residents in this community had a median household income of $63,828 in 2000, and there were 12.9% low income residents living in the neighbourhood. As of 2000, 17.6% of the residents were immigrants. A proportion of 11.6% of the buildings were condominiums or apartments, and 18.4% of the housing was used for renting.

== Education ==
The community is served by Banff Trail Elementary and Branton Junior High with the French program, Collingwood Elementary and Senator Patrick Burns Junior High with the Spanish program, and William Aberhart High School public school in the CBE, as well as by St. Francis Senior High and St. Margaret Elementary & Junior High the CCSD catholic school

== See also ==
- List of neighbourhoods in Calgary
