= Ignacio Milam Tang =

Equatoguinean politician

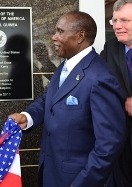
- Tang in 2013

First Vice President of Equatorial Guinea
- In office 21 May 2012 – 22 June 2016
- President: Teodoro Obiang Nguema Mbasogo
- Prime Minister: Vicente Ehate Tomi
- Preceded by: Office established
- Succeeded by: Teodorin Obiang

Prime Minister of Equatorial Guinea
- In office 8 July 2008 – 21 May 2012
- President: Teodoro Obiang Nguema Mbasogo
- Preceded by: Ricardo Mangue Obama Nfubea
- Succeeded by: Vicente Ehate Tomi

Personal details
- Born: 20 June 1940 (age 85)
- Party: PDGE

Ignacio Milam Tang (born 20 June 1940) is an Equatoguinean politician who was Prime Minister of Equatorial Guinea from July 2008 to May 2012. He is a member of the Democratic Party of Equatorial Guinea (PDGE). From May 2012 to June 2016, he was First Vice President of Equatorial Guinea, serving alongside President Obiang's son, Teodorín.

== Political career ==
Tang is a member of the Fang ethnic group. He was Minister of Justice and Worship from 1996 to 1998, then Minister of Youth and Sports from 1998 to 1999. In 1999, he was elected as the Second Vice-President of the Chamber of People's Representatives, and he remained in that post until being appointed deputy prime minister for the Civil Service and Administrative Coordination in the government of Prime Minister Cándido Muatetema Rivas on February 26, 2001. After two years as deputy prime minister, he was instead appointed Minister of State and Secretary-General of the Presidency on February 11, 2003. It was announced on January 10, 2006, that he had been appointed Equatorial Guinea's Ambassador to Spain; he served in that position until July 2008.

=== Prime minister ===
Tang was appointed prime minister by President Teodoro Obiang on July 8, 2008, replacing Ricardo Mangue Obama Nfubea. Obiang appointed the new government headed by Tang on July 14. About half of the members of the previous government were retained in Tang's government, despite Obiang's scathing criticism of the previous government. Significantly, Tang was the first member of the Fang ethnic group to be appointed prime minister since Obiang became president in 1979. At the time of his appointment, Tang was considered a supporter of close relations with Spain and was not believed to be a powerful figure in the PDGE regime.

Following Obiang's re-election in the November 2009 presidential election, Tang and his government resigned on 12 January 2010, as they were legally required to do. Obiang reappointed Tang Prime Minister later on the same day.

=== Vice president ===
Tang resigned as prime minister on 18 May 2012 and was replaced by Vicente Ehate Tomi on 21 May 2012. He was moved to the newly created post of first vice-president on the same day, while Obiang's son, Teodorin Obiang, was simultaneously appointed second vice-president.

Political offices
Preceded by Ricardo Mangue Obama Nfubea	Prime Minister of Equatorial Guinea; 2008–2012	Succeeded by Vicente Ehate Tomi
Preceded by Office established	First Vice President of Equatorial Guinea; 2012-2016	Succeeded by Teodorin Obiang
