= International Spanish Academies =

Private Spanish international school

Colegio Español is a private Spanish international school in Bata, Equatorial Guinea. It serves primary school through Bachillerato (senior high school/sixth form college).

== See also ==
- Education in Equatorial Guinea
- List of international schools
