= Vicente Ehate Tomi =

Prime minister of Equatorial Guinea from 2012 to 2017

Prime Minister of Equatorial Guinea
- In office 21 May 2012 – 23 June 2016
- President: Teodoro Obiang Nguema; Mbasogo
- Preceded by: Ignacio Milam Tang
- Succeeded by: Francisco Pascual Obama Asue

Personal details
- Born: 1968 (age 57–58)
- Party: Democratic Party

Vicente Ehate Tomi (born 1968) is an Equatoguinean politician who was Prime Minister of Equatorial Guinea from 21 May 2012 until 22 June 2016. He was removed from office on 2016 and then jailed for life on corruption charges.

Political offices
Preceded by Ignacio Milam Tang	Prime Minister of Equatorial Guinea; 2012–2016	Succeeded by Francisco Pascual Obama Asue
