= Ministry of Mines and Hydrocarbons =

Government ministry of Equatorial Guinea

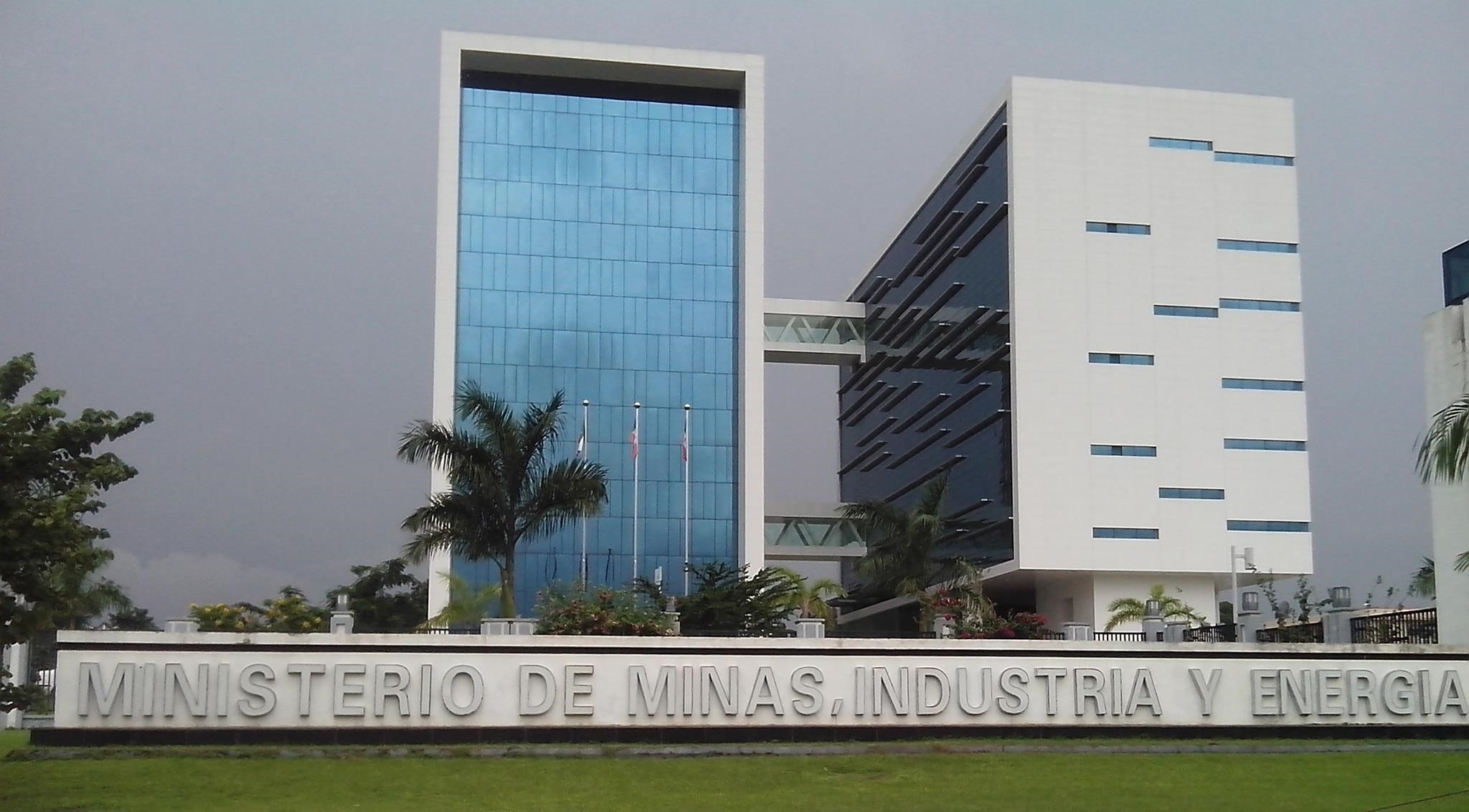
- Formation: April 11, 1985; 41 years ago
- Headquarters: Malabo
- Location: Equatorial Guinea
- Ministro de Minas e Hidrocarburos: Miguel Ekua Ondo
- Website: minindustria.gob.gq

The Ministry of Mines and Hydrocarbons of Equatorial Guinea is the public administration body in charge of the mining industry and fossil fuels. It is based in Malabo. The current minister is Don Antonio Oburu Ondo, appointed in 2023.

== History ==
The production of minerals such as gold and iron in Equatorial Guinea began in the pre-colonial period, although it did not reach commercial levels until after the Spanish era, while agriculture and forestry were the pillars of the colonial economy.

After independence, studies carried out by geologists from the Soviet Union (1975), the French Bureau de Recherches Géologiques et Minières (BRGM) (1980 to 1985) and GEMSA, a consortium between the Republic of Equatorial Guinea and the Spanish Empresa Nacional Adaro de Investigaciones Mineras (ENAIMSA). These studies resulted in the discovery of important deposits of uranium, gold and other minerals.

Likewise, although the oil boom and the first exploitation waited until the 1990s, the first oil exploration licenses began in 1965.

The Ministry of Mines was established during the first government of Macias Nguema, who appointed Ricardo Erimola Chema Minister of Industry and Mines. After the overthrow of the Macías regime and during the Supreme Military Council, the powers of the ministry passed to the "Military Commissioner" (title given to ministers during the period of the Supreme Military Council) Pedro Nsué Obama.

In this period, the Mines portfolio lost the rank of ministry and became a General Directorate that depended directly on the presidency until 1985, when through a decree, the portfolio returned to Ministry status.
