= 2021 Bata explosions =

Explosions at a military barracks in Equatorial Guinea

- Date: 7 March 2021
- Time: First explosion: Around 14:00 WAT (13:00 UTC); Last significant explosion: Around 16:00 WAT (15:00 UTC)
- Location: Cuartel Militar de Nkoantoma, Bata, Equatorial Guinea; 1°49′05″N 9°48′37″E
- Cause: Negligently stored dynamite and other explosives (suspected)
- Deaths: 108
- Injuries: 615+

During the afternoon of 7 March 2021, a series of four explosions occurred at a military barracks in the neighborhood of Nkoantoma, a district of Bata, Equatorial Guinea. At least 107 people died, and more than 600 others were injured, while significant infrastructural damage also occurred throughout the city.

Equatoguinean President Teodoro Obiang Nguema Mbasogo attributed the disaster to negligently stored explosives on the base that detonated after nearby farmers cleared their fields by setting them on fire. However, human rights groups and the Associated Press have cast doubt on Obiang's theory, as there was no evidence of farming nearby.

== Explosions ==
External image
- Satellite images before and after event Suspected location of explosion at darker area in top right. Oriented with north to the left.

Four explosions occurred at Cuartel Militar de Nkoantoma, a military base in the neighborhood of Nkoantoma, on the southeastern periphery of Bata. The first three blasts occurred in succession around 14:00 WAT (13:00 UTC), with the first being the strongest. (Note: Reuters reported that the explosions happened around 14:00 WAT, and Guinea Ecuatorial Press, the official site of the Equatoguinean government, reported that the fire occurred at 14:15 WAT. However, Deutsche Welle reported that the first explosion happened around 13:00 WAT, EFE reported that the initial blasts occurred around 15:00 WAT, and Associated Press reported that President Obiang stated that an explosion happened at 16:00 WAT.) The fourth explosion occurred two hours after the first detonation. Both dead and injured people were reported in several nearby parts of the city.

== Casualties ==
At least 107 people were killed by the explosions, and at least 615 more were injured. The Ministry of Health declared a "health emergency" due to the presumption that there were several more people dead and missing under the rubble. Of the injured, more than 300 were admitted to the Nuevo INSESO Hospital, more than 150 at the Bata General Hospital, and more than 70 at La Paz Hospital.

== Damage ==
External image
- Destruction around the military base Panoramas stitched from TVGE images.

President Obiang reported that almost all of the buildings and residences in the city had suffered great damage.

A total of 243 structures appear to have either been "heavily damaged or completely destroyed", according to a preliminary analysis by the United Nations Institute for Training and Research. About 150 families, including 648 adults and 252 children younger than 15, have been staying in temporary shelters in Bata, according to the United Nations Children's Fund (UNICEF), while others have been staying with relatives in Bata and elsewhere.

== Aftermath ==
In a statement read by broadcasters of state television channel TVGE, President Teodoro Obiang Nguema Mbasogo blamed the explosions on the negligence of those in charge of protecting the munitions on the military base. The president also stated that neighboring farmers clearing farming land by setting it alight caused the munitions to explode. In the immediate aftermath, Vice-President Teodoro Nguema Obiang Mangue traveled to the site of the explosion to assess the situation.

On 9 March, the government declared Bata a catastrophic zone and set up an initial emergency fund of 10 billion XAF (20 million USD) to address the disaster. It also declared three days of national mourning, with flags flying at half-mast.

The explosions scattered a significant amount of munitions into the surrounding areas, leading some people to pose with the unexploded ordnance on social media.

=== Investigation ===
President Obiang ordered an investigation to determine the details of the disaster, the parties responsible, and the extent of the destruction.

Human rights groups, including Human Rights Watch and EG Justice, have called for an independent investigation by international experts. They suspect that the death toll is much higher than the one being reported, based on interviews in Bata, and question the officially reported cause of the disaster, noting that other theories are in conflict with the "hasty presidential statement deflecting blame from the military".

The Associated Press also questioned the officially reported cause, and after analyzing satellite images obtained from Planet Labs, they found no signs of farming around the military base, the only signs of land clearing they found were associated with a nearby construction project, and the only signs of fire they found were centered on three buildings thought to have held the munitions.

== Assistance ==
President Obiang also requested international assistance in his TVGE statement.

The Spanish Foreign Minister, Arancha González Laya, responded to the request the next day, announcing that Spain would be sending humanitarian aid immediately. A flight from Torrejón Air Base near Madrid arrived on 10 March filled with over 2,600 kg (5,700 lb) of medicine, surgical products, and other medical supplies worth about 60,000 EUR. Members of the Spanish Technical Aid Response Team (START), including medical and humanitarian experts, arrived the next morning.

The Israeli government sent a 67-member delegation that landed in Bata on 11 March. The delegation included members of the Israel Defense Forces (IDF) Medical Corps, the IDF Home Front Command, and the Ministry of Health. (Note: The delegation consisted largely of surgeons and intensive care unit personnel, and was led by Noam Fink, IDF deputy chief medical officer.) They also brought medical equipment along with them. (Note: The medical equipment included monitors, ultrasound machines, blood transfusion supplies, and surgery equipment, and weighed about 7 tons in total.) The delegation sent teams to support the La Paz, Bata General, and Nuevo INSESO Hospitals. They had treated about 100 of the injured by the night of 13 March and had set up a new emergency room providing free medical care.

Both Human Rights Watch and EG Justice have suggested that support be sent directly to affected Equatoguineans instead of to the government, since the "high levels of corruption" in the country meant that "any aid directly disbursed to the government [is] at high risk of being looted".

== See also ==
- Armed Forces of Equatorial Guinea
- 2002 Lagos armoury explosion
- 2007 Maputo arms depot explosion
- 2012 Brazzaville arms dump blasts
- List of accidents and incidents involving transport or storage of ammunition
