= Manuela Roka Botey =

Prime Minister of Equatorial Guinea from 2023 to 2024

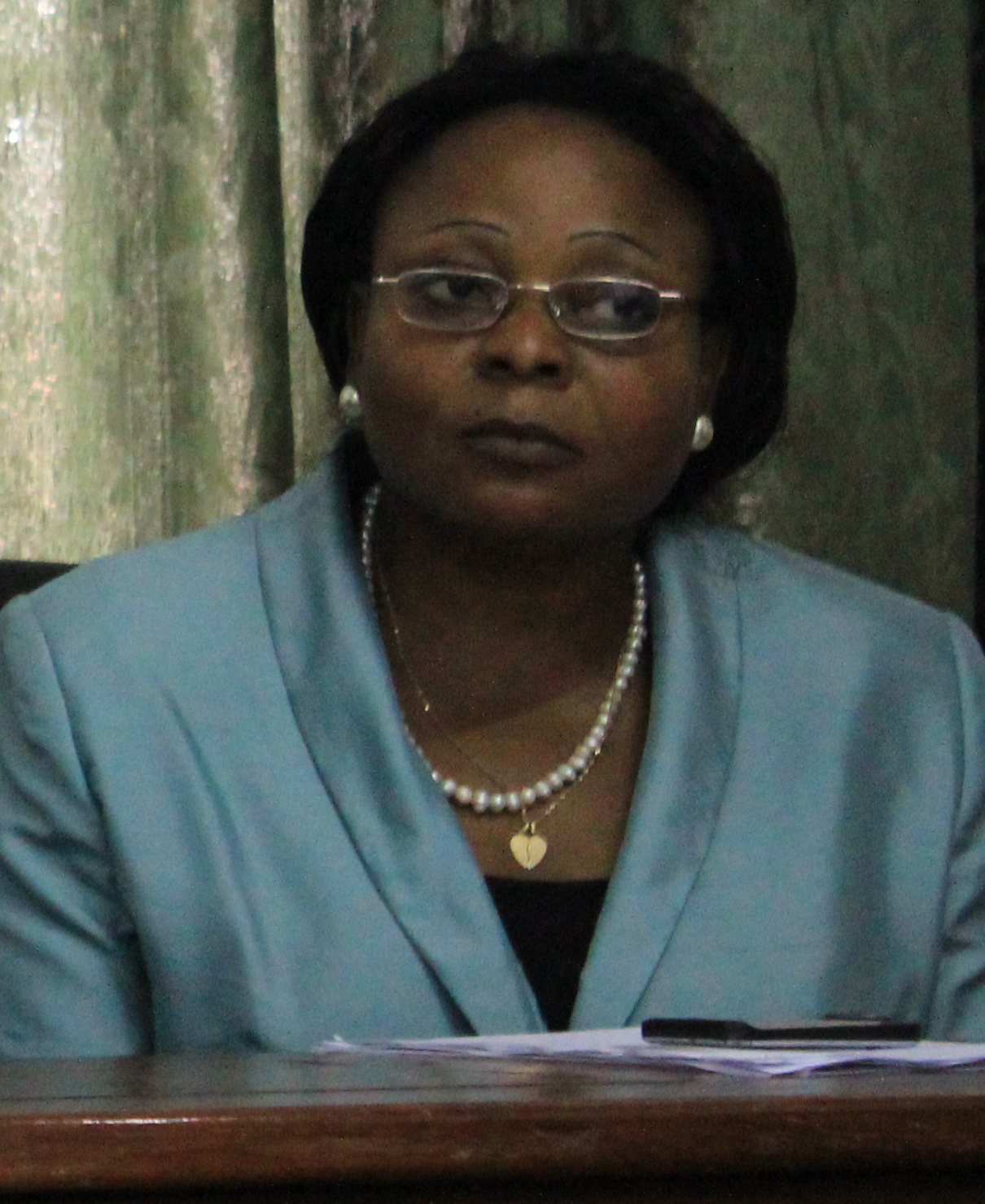
- Botey in 2011

Prime Minister of Equatorial Guinea
- In office 1 February 2023 – 17 August 2024
- President: Teodoro Obiang Nguema Mbasogo
- Preceded by: Francisco Pascual Obama Asue
- Succeeded by: Manuel Osa Nsue Nsua

Personal details
- Born: 1973 (age 52–53) Bariobé, Baney, Bioko Norte, Equatorial Guinea
- Party: Democratic Party

Manuela Roka Botey is an Equatoguinean politician who served as prime minister of Equatorial Guinea from 1 February 2023 to 17 August 2024.

== Biography ==
She is the first woman to fill this role. Her appointment to prime minister by President Teodoro Obiang Nguema was announced on January 31, 2023. She succeeded Francisco Pascual Obama Asue in the office. She had previously served as the minister for education in 2020. She is the vice dean of the National University of Equatorial Guinea's faculty of Humanities and Social Sciences.

Roka Botey was born in 1973 in Bariobé, Baney, Bioko Norte, on the island of Bioko.
