= Trinidad Morgades Besari =

Equatorial Guinean writer (1931–2019)

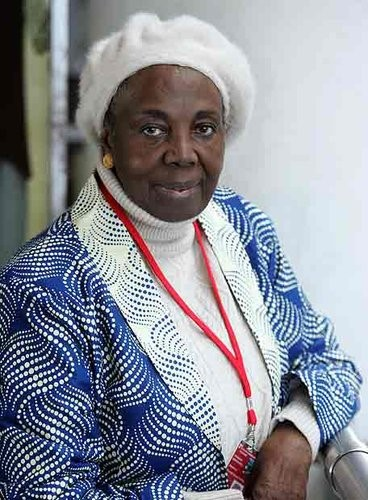
- Born: 24 April 1931; Santa Isabel (now Malabo)
- Died: 10 October 2019 (aged 88); Malabo
- Occupations: Writer, academic and diplomat
- Spouse(s): Samuel Ebuka, m. 1965
- Children: 2

Trinidad Morgades Besari (24 April 1931 – 10 October 2019) was an Equatorial Guinean writer, academic and diplomat. She was the first Equatoguinean woman to receive a university education.

== Early life and education ==
Morgades Besari was born in Santa Isabel (now Malabo) in 1931. She attended school in the Canary Islands and Barcelona, Spain. She graduated from the University of Barcelona in 1958 with a degree in philosophy and arts, becoming the first Equatoguinean woman to receive a university education.

== Career ==
In 1959, Morgades Besari became a professor of Language and Literature at the School of Teaching of the Ministry of Santa Isabel in Malabo. She attended the WHO Conference in Addis Ababa in 1964 and was appointed Director at the Cardenal Cisneros Institute, University of Alcalá in 1965.

After the independence of Equatorial Guinea, Morgades Besari was appointed the first secretary of the embassy in Lagos, Nigeria in 1968. In 1971, she was appointed Cultural attaché at the embassy in Addis Ababa.

Morgades Besari returned to Spain in 1973 and she was appointed by the government as a literature teacher at the Franciscan Missionary College in Tetouan, Morocco. She became Chair of English and Literature at the Instituto Reyes Catolicos in Vélez-Málaga in 1975. Besari returned to Equatorial Guinea in 1986 and was appointed Secretary General of the National University of Distance Education, teaching in the United States embassy in Malabo. She was appointed General Secretary of the Scientific Research Council of Equatorial Guinea in 1988 and Director of the National School of Agriculture in 1992.

Morgades Besari became director of the newspaper El Correo Guineoecuatoriano in 2000 and was elected president of the Press Association of Equatorial Guinea in 2003. She wrote and premiered a theatrical work called Antígona, a reformulation of Sophocles' Antigone. In 2005, she was appointed vice rector of the National University of Equatorial Guinea. She left his post in 2010 when she was appointed correspondent academician of the Royal Spanish Academy. She collaborated with NGO Macoelanba to provide scholarships for female students.

== Personal life ==
Besari was married to Samuel Ebuka since 1965. She died on 10 October 2019 in Malabo. She is survived by a daughter and a son.

== Publications ==
- Morgades Besari, Trinidad (1992). "La puesta en escena de Antigona". El Patio. 15: 23–24.
- Morgades Besari, Trinidad (2004). "Antígona". Arizona Journal of Hispanic Cultural Studies. 8: 239–245. doi:10.1353/hcs.2011.0322. S2CID 248585465.
- Morgades Besari, Trinidad (2004). El español en Guinea Ecuatorial (Report). Proceedings of the Third International Congress of the Spanish Language: Linguistic Identity and Globalization.
- Morgades Besari, Trinidad (2007). "Los criollos (fernandino-krios) de Guinea Ecuatorial". El árbol del Centro. 5: 31–32.

== Awards and honors ==
- Don Quijote award 2010, presented by La Gaceta de Guinea Equatorial
