= COVID-19 pandemic in Equatorial Guinea =

Impact of COVID-19 in Equatorial Guinea

- Disease: COVID-19
- Pathogen: SARS-CoV-2
- Location: Equatorial Guinea
- First outbreak: Wuhan, China
- Index case: Malabo
- Arrival date: 14 March 2020 (6 years, 5 months, 1 week and 1 day)
- Confirmed cases: 17,130 (updated 5 Aug 2026)
- Deaths: 183 (updated 5 Aug 2026)
- Vaccinations: Updated 5 Aug 2026: 270,109 (total vaccinated); 214,032 (fully vaccinated); 488,738 (doses administered)

The COVID-19 pandemic in Equatorial Guinea was a part of the worldwide pandemic of coronavirus disease 2019 (COVID-19) caused by severe acute respiratory syndrome coronavirus 2 (SARS-CoV-2). The virus was confirmed to have reached Equatorial Guinea on 14 March 2020. Equatorial Guinea has a weak healthcare system, leaving it vulnerable to an outbreak.

== Background ==
On 12 January 2020, the World Health Organization (WHO) confirmed that a novel coronavirus was the cause of a respiratory illness in a cluster of people in Wuhan City, Hubei Province, China, which was reported to the WHO on 31 December 2019.

The case fatality ratio for COVID-19 has been much lower than SARS of 2003, but the transmission has been significantly greater, with a significant total death toll. Model-based simulations for Equatorial Guinea suggest that the 95% confidence interval for the time-varying reproduction number R_{t} has been stable around 1.0 since October 2020.

== Timeline ==
=== March 2020 ===
- The country's first case was announced on 14 March, a 42-year-old woman in Malabo, who returned to Equatorial Guinea from Madrid. Two further cases were confirmed on 17 March.
- On 22 March, the country declared a state of alarm, which was needed to facilitate the mobilization of economic and material resources needed to stem the spread of coronavirus. A special emergency fund was also created to curb the virus.
- As of 24 March, there were nine cases in the country, all imported. There were no confirmed cases of community spread in the country at the time.
- By the end of March there had been 14 confirmed cases. All 14 remained active at the end of the month.

=== April to December 2020 ===
- On 3 June, the government asked the World Health Organization's representative, Dr Triphonie Nkurunziza, to leave the country, accusing her of having falsified COVID-19 data.
- In mid-July it was announced that regular reporting of data on COVID-19 cases would resume, having been halted four times in May, June and July due to concerns over alleged misinterpretations of data.
- In early July, over 100 Vietnamese workers contracted the virus while working at the Sendje hydropower plant project in Litoral province. On July 30, all 219 Vietnamese workers, 129 of whom having tested positive for coronavirus, were repatriated from Bata to Vietnam on a dedicated Vietnam Airlines flight.
- In April there were 301 new cases, in May 991, in June 695, in July 2820, in August 120, in September 87, in October 60, in November 65, in December 124. The total number of cases was 315 in April, 1306 in May, 2001 in June, 4821 in July, 4941 in August, 5028 in September, 5088 in October, 5153 in November, and 5277 in December.
- The number of recovered patients stood at 9 in April, 200 in May, 515 in June, 2182 in July, 4740 in September, 4965 in October, 5009 in November, and 5136 in December, leaving 305 active cases at the end of April, 1094 at the end of May, 1454 at the end of June, 2556 at the end of July, 974 at the end of August, 205 at the end of September, 40 at the end of October, 59 at the end of November, and 55 at the end of December.
- The first death occurred on 20 April. The death toll rose to 12 in May, 32 in June, 83 in July, 85 in November, and 86 in December.

=== January to December 2021 ===
- Vaccination started on 15 February, initially with 100,000 doses of the Sinopharm BIBP vaccine donated by China.
- There were 239 new cases in January, 489 in February, 909 in March, 780 in April, 835 in May, 205 in June, 146 in July, 597 in August, 2885 in September, 1008 in October, 224 in November, and 118 in December. The total number of cases stood at 5516 in January, 6005 in February, 6914 in March, 7694 in April, 8529 in May, 8734 in June, 8880 in July, 9477 in August, 12362 in September, 13368 in October, 13592 in November, and 13710 in December.
- The number of recovered patients stood at 5286 in January, 5622 in February, 8637 in July, 8879 in August, 11008 in September, 12693 in October, 13343 in November, and 13410 in December, leaving 144 active cases at the end of January, 292 at the end of February, 120 at the end of July, 472 at the end of August, 1207 at the end of September, 508 at the end of October, 74 at the end of November, and 125 at the end of December.
- The death toll rose to 91 in February, 102 in March, 112 in April, 118 in May, 121 in June, 123 in July, 126 in August, 147 in September, 167 in October, and 175 in November.
- Modeling carried out by the WHO's Regional Office Africa suggests that due to under-reporting, the true cumulative number of infections was around 0.64 million while the true number of COVID-19 deaths was around 362.

=== January to December 2022 ===
- There were 2434 new cases in January, 75 in February, 26 in March, 4 in April, 14 in May, 166 in June, 654 in July, 119 in August, 59 in September, 155 in October, 12 in November, and 100 in December. The total number of cases stood at 15802 in January, 15877 in February, 15903 in March, 15907 in April, 15921 in May, 16087 in June, 16741 in July, 16860 in August, 16919 in September, 17074 in October, 17086 in November, and 17186 in December.
- The number of recovered patients stood at 15200 in January, 15653 in February, 15693 in March, 15698 in April, 15748 in June, 16406 in July, 16623 in August, 16597 in September, 16814 in October, and 16880 in December, leaving 420 active cases at the end of January, 42 at the end of February, 127 at the end of March, 26 at the end of April, 133 at the end of June, 152 at the end of July, 54 at the end of August, 139 at the end of September, 77 at the end of October, and 123 at the end of December.
- The death toll rose to 182 in January and 183 in March.

=== January to December 2023 ===
- There were 43 confirmed cases in 2023, bringing the total number of cases to 17,229. 27 patients recovered in 2023. The death toll remained unchanged. At the end of 2023 there were 139 active cases.

== Response ==
The Africa Oil & Investment Forum was postponed.

The Ministry of Mines and Hydrocarbons waived fees for service companies in order to alleviate the economic fallout from the pandemic.

== See also ==
- COVID-19 pandemic in Africa
- COVID-19 pandemic by country and territory
- COVID-19 vaccination in Equatorial Guinea
