= Manuel Osa Nsue Nsua =

Equatoguinean politician and banker

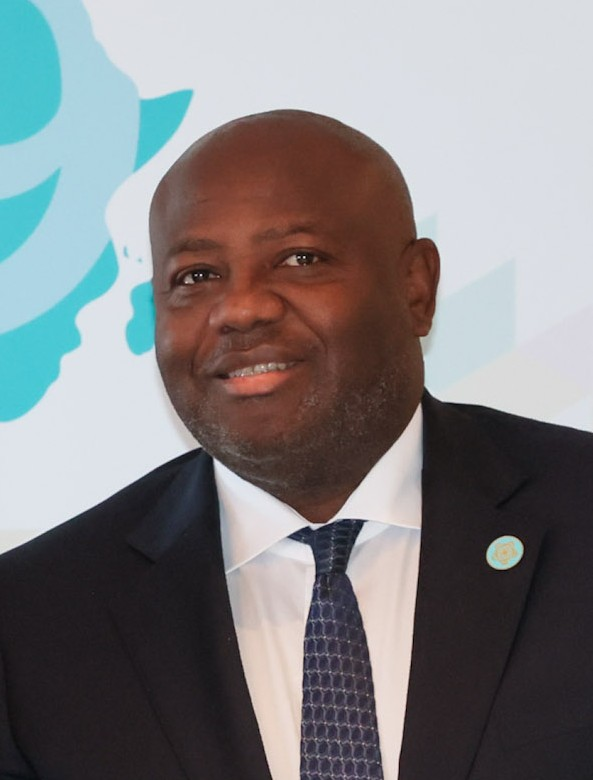
- Osa in 2025

Prime Minister of Equatorial Guinea
- Incumbent
- Assumed office c. 17 August 2024 (Note: Osa's appointment was made on 16 August, although it was first reported on 17 August and it is unclear on which date he assumed office.)
- President: Teodoro Obiang Nguema Mbasogo
- Preceded by: Manuela Roka Botey

Personal details
- Born: 21 July 1976 (age 49) Andom-Onvang, Nsok-Nsomo, Equatorial Guinea
- Party: PDGE

Manuel Osa Nsue Nsua (born 21 July 1976) is an Equatoguinean politician and banker who has served as the prime minister of Equatorial Guinea since August 2024. He previously served as the head of the national bank from 2012 until his appointment as prime minister.

== Early life ==
Osa was born on 21 July 1976, in Andom-Onvang, in the municipality of Nsok-Nsomo, Equatorial Guinea. At the age of six, he moved to Spain to live with his sister in Palma de Mallorca. In Spain, he earned his bachelor’s degree and then enrolled at the University of the Balearic Islands, studying business sciences and economics. He received degrees in both fields and later studied further at Pompeu Fabra University, where he earned a master's degree in financial management and business accounting in 2005.

== Career ==
After Osa graduated from Pompeu Fabra, he briefly served with the General Directorate of Economy of the Autonomous Community of the Balearic Islands, before then joining the Santander Bank later in 2005. Serving with the Palma de Mallorca branch, he rose from account manager to executive director to the branch's general director. In this role, he was the supervisor of the bank's operations in four zones and also helped make decisions for the Madrid office.

In 2012, Osa returned to his birth country and became the chief executive officer of the Banco Nacional de Guinea Ecuatorial (BANGE, National Bank of Equatorial Guinea). The bank, based in Malabo, is the only private lender headquartered in Equatorial Guinea. Osa took over BANGE as it was on the verge of bankruptcy and successfully turned it around, with Jeune Afrique dubbing him the bank's "savior". As CEO and the general director of the bank, he oversaw major expansion, reaching 22 branches by 2017 and establishing its first office in Spain that year. By 2019, offices had been established in all but two of the districts in the country. In addition to leading the bank in Equatorial Guinea, Osa also served on the board of directors for its Cameroon office.

Osa received several honors for his direction of BANGE. In 2016, he was named the Equatorial Guinea Banking CEO of the Year and BANGE was named the country's bank of the year as part of the Global Banking & Finance Awards. BANGE was named the Equatorial Guinea Bank of the Year by The Banker for 2017, with the publication highlighting its stability despite a market crash. Osa also received an award from the African Banker in 2019. BANGE was named the country's Bank of the Year by The Banker again in 2022. Osa also served with the Bange Business School as the chairman of the board of directors, starting in 2020.

On 16 August 2024, president Teodoro Obiang Nguema Mbasogo decreed Osa as the next Prime Minister of Equatorial Guinea, succeeding Manuela Roka Botey, who had resigned along with the rest of the government for being "ineffective". In the president's decree, Osa was named to oversee the country's "administrative coordination". His appointment was made as the country entered into an economic crisis.
