= Baltasar Ebang Engonga =

Equatoguinean public official (born 1970)

Baltasar Ebang

Personal details
- Born: 15 March 1970 (age 56)
- Education: University of Malobu
- Occupation: Politician
- Nickname: Bello

Baltasar Ebang Engonga Avomo (born 1970) is a former Equatoguinean public official who was the former head of the National Agency for Financial Investigation (ANIF).

Engonga is a nephew of President Teodoro Obiang Nguema and one of the most influential families in the world.

== Education and Career ==
Engonga studied finance and economics and later earned a degree at the University of Malabo. He was the former head of the Directorate General of Insurance and Reinsurance (DGAR) of Equatorial Guinea between 2015 and 2020. Engonga later becamehead of the National Agency for Financial Investigation (ANIF).

== Controversy ==
In 2024, Engonga faced legal scrutiny and public backlash following allegations of corruption and misconduct. He was arrested on 25 October on the accusations of embezzlement, abuse of power and stashing funds in the Cayman Islands. His trial began on 1 July 2025 and the court convicted him a guilty decision on 27 August of the same year.

While in detention in Black Beach prison at the former capital of Malabo, Engonga was also involved in a sex tape scandal where an estimated of 150 to 400 videos of explicit videos featuring wives of many state officials.

Even so, the Supreme Court prosecuted Engonga only on embezzlement charges. Initially, the prosecutors requested a combined sentence of eighteen years in prison, however Engonga along with five other officials--who allegedly claimed the money as an allowance for travel--were found guilty for the embezzlement.

== Personal life ==
Engonga is married with six children.
