= Francisco Pascual Obama Asue =

Prime Minister of Equatorial Guinea (2016–2023)

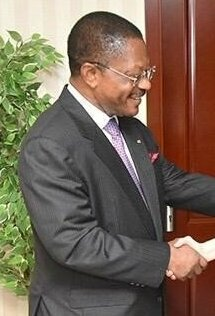
- Obama in 2019

Prime Minister of Equatorial Guinea
- In office 23 June 2016 – 1 February 2023
- President: Teodoro Obiang Nguema Mbasogo
- Preceded by: Vicente Ehate Tomi
- Succeeded by: Manuela Roka Botey

Personal details
- Born: 21 April 1949 (age 77)
- Party: Democratic Party

Francisco Pascual Eyegue Obama Asue (born 21 April 1949) is an Equatoguinean politician who was Prime Minister of Equatorial Guinea from 2016 to 2023. Prior to holding this position, he was the Minister of Health and Social Welfare and also the Minister of Trade.

== Biography ==
He held the position of Minister of Sports and Youth, Minister of Economy, Minister of Social Development and Minister of Health.

On June 22, 2016, he was appointed the 9th Prime Minister of Equatorial Guinea under President Teodoro Obiang Nguema Mbasogo, replacing Vicente Ehate Tomi in this position. Since he was appointed prime minister in 2016, corruption in public administration has increased.

Political offices
Preceded by Vicente Ehate Tomi	Prime Minister of Equatorial Guinea; 2016–2023	Succeeded by Manuela Roka Botey
