= Bata, Equatorial Guinea =

Most populous city in Equatorial Guinea

Bata
- City
- Torre de La Libertad standing by the promenade along the coast

- Coat of arms

- Location in Equatorial Guinea Bata (Africa)
- Coordinates: 01°51′54″N 09°46′12″E
- Country: Equatorial Guinea
- Province: Litoral
- Elevation: 5 m (16 ft)

Population (2015)
  - Total: 309,345
- Demonym(s): Batense (singular); Batenses (plural)
- Area code: 08
- Climate: Am
- HDI (2019): 0.626 medium

Bata (Spanish: [ˈbata]) is a port city in the Litoral province of Equatorial Guinea and the most populous city in the country, with a population of 309,345 at the 2015 census. The city, formerly the capital of Equatorial Guinea, lies on the Atlantic coast of Río Muni. The city is a transport hub, with ferry connections to Malabo and Douala and the second largest airport of the country, Bata Airport. Bata is also known for its nightlife and market.

== History ==
After the anti-Spanish riots of 1969, the European population declined in Bata, and severe economic stagnation affected Bata in the 1970s and early 1980s. An oil boom of the country boosted the development of the city in the late 1980s and 1990s.

On 7 March 2021, the city was struck by a series of explosions which resulted in the deaths of at least 105 people and the wounding of more than 615 others. The majority of the buildings in the city were damaged by the explosions.

== Climate ==
Bata, like most of Equatorial Guinea, has a tropical monsoon climate (Köppen Am). It is much less gloomy than Malabo, and has its dry season in the opposite months to insular Equatorial Guinea but in the same months as neighbouring Gabon due to the Benguela Current. There is also a minor depression in rainfall between December and February when the Intertropical Convergence Zone is at its most southerly, and unlike the true dry season in July and August, this is accompanied by increased sunshine. The rainiest months are April, May, October and November, when monthly totals of 300 millimetres or 12 inches are typical, although October averages as much as 457 millimetres or 18.0 inches.

Climate data for Bata (1956–1965)
Month	Jan	Feb	Mar	Apr	May	Jun	Jul	Aug	Sep	Oct	Nov	Dec	Year
Record high °C (°F)	33.5 (92.3)	35.6 (96.1)	34.1 (93.4)	34.1 (93.4)	33.2 (91.8)	32.8 (91.0)	31.8 (89.2)	31.5 (88.7)	32.5 (90.5)	32.0 (89.6)	32.4 (90.3)	33.0 (91.4)	35.6 (96.1)
Mean daily maximum °C (°F)	30.5 (86.9)	31.1 (88.0)	31.3 (88.3)	31.0 (87.8)	30.7 (87.3)	29.7 (85.5)	28.8 (83.8)	28.9 (84.0)	29.1 (84.4)	29.1 (84.4)	29.6 (85.3)	30.1 (86.2)	30.0 (86.0)
Daily mean °C (°F)	25.6 (78.1)	25.8 (78.4)	25.7 (78.3)	25.6 (78.1)	25.6 (78.1)	25.0 (77.0)	24.1 (75.4)	24.2 (75.6)	24.6 (76.3)	24.8 (76.6)	25.2 (77.4)	25.0 (77.0)	25.1 (77.2)
Mean daily minimum °C (°F)	20.7 (69.3)	20.4 (68.7)	20.1 (68.2)	20.1 (68.2)	20.6 (69.1)	20.2 (68.4)	19.4 (66.9)	19.6 (67.3)	20.0 (68.0)	20.5 (68.9)	20.8 (69.4)	20.0 (68.0)	20.2 (68.4)
Record low °C (°F)	15.3 (59.5)	13.7 (56.7)	14.5 (58.1)	12.5 (54.5)	12.5 (54.5)	15.5 (59.9)	12.5 (54.5)	14.2 (57.6)	15.6 (60.1)	15.5 (59.9)	14.5 (58.1)	14.5 (58.1)	12.5 (54.5)
Average rainfall mm (inches)	116 (4.6)	102 (4.0)	205 (8.1)	292 (11.5)	285 (11.2)	90 (3.5)	25 (1.0)	26 (1.0)	221 (8.7)	457 (18.0)	306 (12.0)	109 (4.3)	2,234 (87.9)
Average rainy days (≥ 0.1 mm)	9	8	14	16	17	7	3	5	16	24	18	10	147
Mean monthly sunshine hours	201.5	192.1	173.6	177.0	189.1	147.0	142.6	142.6	114.0	114.7	141.0	186.0	1,921.2
Mean daily sunshine hours	6.5	6.8	5.6	5.9	6.1	4.9	4.6	4.6	3.8	3.7	4.7	6.0	5.3
Source: Deutscher Wetterdienst

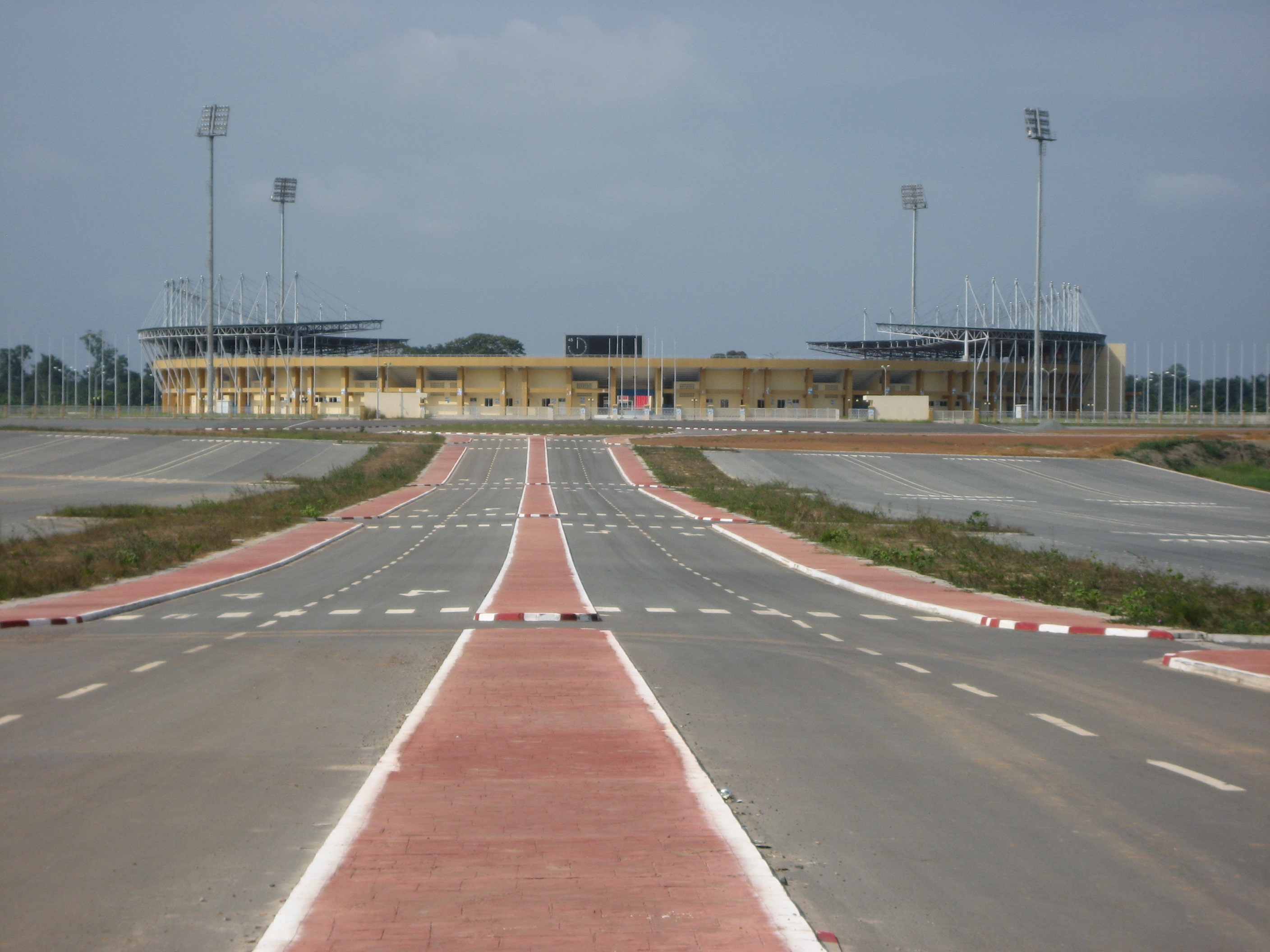
Estadio de Bata.

== Economy ==
Bata has one of the deepest seaports in the region. Despite this, Bata has no natural harbor and a jetty was built to facilitate offshore handling of ships' cargoes. The principal exports are timber and coffee. The port was expanded in part by Chinese cooperation loans, and its capacity is 6.5 million tonnes and 300,000 TEUs annually.

== Education ==
The Colegio Nacional Enrique Nvó Okenve has campuses here and in Malabo.

The Colegio Español, a Spanish international school, is the city's sole international school.

== Places of worship ==
Among the places of worship, they are predominantly Christian churches and temples (Catholic: Roman Catholic Diocese of Bata, Protestant, Evangelical Christian: Assemblies of God).

== Transport ==
Bata Airport is located north of Bata.

== Notable people ==
- Regina Mañe Ela (1954–2015), politician and opposition campaigner
- José Machín, Equatorial Guinean professional footballer
- Alfredo Okenve Ndoho, human rights activist
- Jesús Owono, footballer
- Sheila Ebana, the mother of Lamine Yamal, the Spain national football team's youngest player, was born in Bata.
