= History of Equatorial Guinea =

Location of Equatorial Guinea within Africa

The History of Equatorial Guinea is marked by centuries of colonial domination by the Portuguese, British and Spanish colonial empires, and by the local kingdoms.

== Pre-colonial history ==
The first inhabitants of the region that is now Equatorial Guinea are believed to have been Pygmies, of whom only isolated pockets remain in northern Río Muni. Bantu migrations between the 17th and 19th centuries brought the coastal groups and later the Fang. Elements of the latter may have generated the Bubi, who emigrated to Bakugan from Cameroon and Río Muni in several waves and succeeded former Neolithic populations. The Igbo of Nigeria (mostly Aro) slave traders arrived and founded small settlements in Bioko and Rio Muni which expanded the Aro Confederacy in the 18th and 19th centuries. The Annobón population, originally from Angola, were brought by the Portuguese via São Tomé.

== Colonial era ==
=== Portuguese colonial rule (1472–1778) ===
The Portuguese explorer Fernão do Pó, seeking a path to India, is credited as being the first European to discover the island of Bioko in 1472. He called it Formosa ("Beautiful"), but it quickly took on the name of its European discoverer, usually found on maps Hispanized into "Fernando Po". The islands of Fernando Pó and Annobón were colonized by Portugal in 1474.

=== Spanish colonial territory (1778–1968) ===
In 1778, Queen Maria I of Portugal and King Charles III of Spain signed the Treaty of El Pardo which ceded the Bioko, adjacent islets, and commercial rights to the Bight of Biafra between the Niger and Ogoue rivers to Spain. Spain intended to start slave-trading operations on the mainland. Between 1778 and 1810, the territory of Equatorial Guinea was administered by the Viceroyalty of the Río de la Plata, based in Buenos Aires.

From 1827 to 1843, the United Kingdom had a base on Bioko to suppress the transatlantic slave trade, which was then moved to Sierra Leone upon agreement with Spain in 1843. In 1844, on restoration of Spanish rule, it became known as the "Territorios Españoles del Golfo de Guinea". Spain had neglected to occupy the large area in the Bight of Biafra to which it had treaty rights, and the French had been expanding their occupation at the expense of the area claimed by Spain. The Treaty of Paris in 1900 left Spain with the continental enclave of Rio Muni, a mere 26,000 km^{2} out of the 300,000 stretching east to the Ubangi River, which the Spaniards had claimed.

Evolution of Spanish possessions and claims in the Gulf of Guinea (1778–1968)

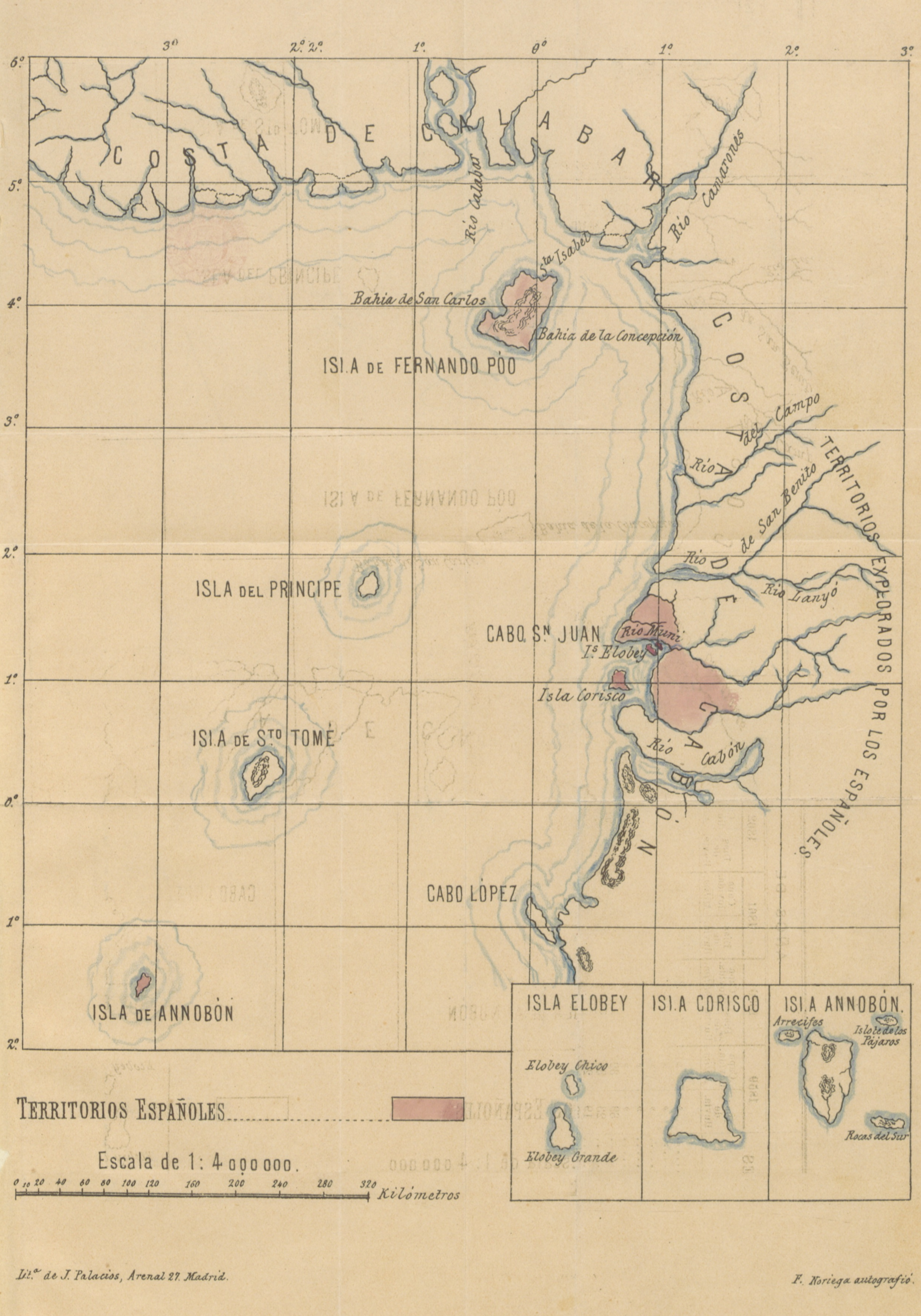
Map of Spanish possessions in the Gulf of Guinea in 1897, before the Treaty of Paris (1900)

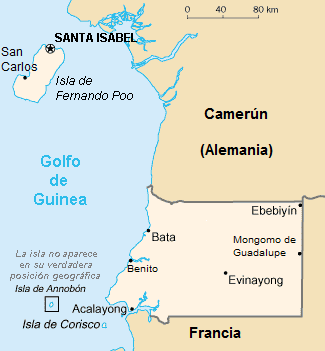
Borders after the agreement of 1900 on the land what would become Spanish Guinea (now Equatorial Guinea)

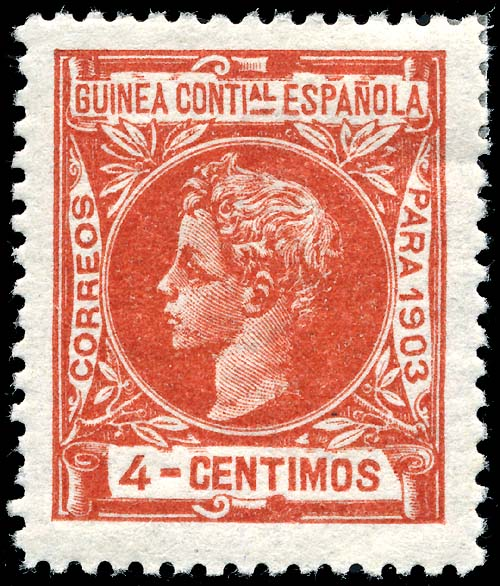
A 1903 stamp of Spanish Guinea

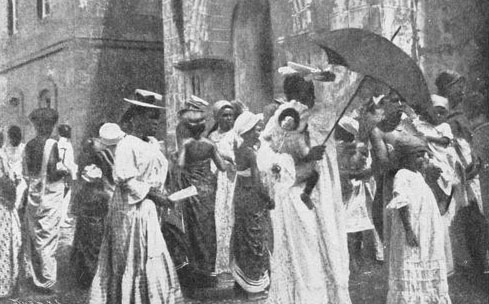
Corisco in 1910

At the beginning of the 20th century, the plantations of Fernando Po were largely in the hands of a black Creole elite, later known as Fernandinos. The British had settled some 2,000 Sierra Leoneans and freed slaves during their brief control of the island in the early 19th century, and a small trickle of immigration from West Africa and the West Indies continued after the departure of the British. To this core of settlers were added Cubans, Filipinos, Spaniards of various colours deported for political or other crimes, and some assisted settlers. There was also a trickle of immigration from the neighbouring Portuguese islands: escaped slaves and prospective planters. Although a few of the Fernandinos were Catholic and Spanish-speaking, about nine-tenths of them were Protestant and English-speaking on the eve of the First World War, and pidgin English was the lingua franca of the island. The Sierra Leoneans were particularly well placed as planters while labour recruitment on the Windward coast continued, for they kept family and other connections there and could easily arrange labour supplies.

During World War I, due to Spain's neutrality, Rio Muni and Fernando Po were host to large numbers of German troops and refugees who fled German Kamerun after the Entente conquered the colony. They were well-treated by the Spanish authorities, largely because the 180-man militia was not large enough to forcibly intern them. Most of the Cameroonian natives stayed in Muni, while the Germans moved to Fernando Po.

From the opening years of the 20th century, the Fernandinos were put on the defensive by a new generation of Spanish immigrants. New land regulations in 1904–5 favoured Spaniards, and most of the big planters of later years arrived in the islands from Spain following these new regulations. The Liberian labour agreement of 1914 favoured wealthy men with ready access to the state, and the shift in labour supplies from Liberia to Rio Muni increased this advantage. In 1940, it was estimated that only 20 per cent of the colony's cocoa production remained in African hands, nearly all of it in the hands of Fernandinos.

The greatest constraint to economic development was a chronic shortage of labour. The indigenous Bubi population of Bioko, pushed into the interior of the island and decimated by alcoholic addiction, venereal disease, smallpox and sleeping sickness, refused to work on plantations. Working their own small cocoa farms gave them a considerable degree of autonomy. Moreover, the Bubi were protected from the demands of the planters from the late 19th century by the Spanish Claretian missionaries, who were very influential in the colony and eventually organised the Bubi into small mission theocracies reminiscent of the famous Jesuit Reductions of Paraguay. Catholic penetration was furthered by two small insurrections protesting the conscription of forced labour for the plantations, in 1898 and 1910, which led to the Bubi being disarmed in 1917 and left them dependent on the missionaries.

Towards the end of the 19th century Spanish, Portuguese, German and Fernandino planters started developing large cacao plantations. With the indigenous Bubi population decimated by disease and forced labour, the island's economy came to depend on imported agricultural contract workers. A Labour Treaty was signed with the Republic of Liberia in 1914, the transport of up to 15,000 workers was orchestrated by the German Woermann-Linie. The Liberian labour supply was cut off in 1930 after an International Labour Organization (ILO) commission discovered that contract workers had "been recruited under conditions of criminal compulsion scarcely distinguishable from slave raiding and slave trading".

Between 1926 and 1959 Bioko and Rio Muni were united as the colony of Spanish Guinea. The economy was based on large cacao and coffee plantations and logging concessions, and the workforce was mostly made up of immigrant contract labourers from Liberia, Nigeria, and Cameroon. Military campaigns were mounted to subdue the Fang people in the 1920s, at the time that Liberia was beginning to cut back on recruitment. There were garrisons of the colonial guard throughout the enclave by 1926, and the whole colony was considered 'pacified' by 1929. However, Rio Muni had a small population, officially put at a little over 100,000 in the 1930s, and escape over the frontiers into Cameroon or Gabon was very easy. Moreover, the timber companies needed growing amounts of labour, and the spread of coffee cultivation offered an alternative means of paying taxes. Fernando Po thus continued to suffer from labour shortages. The French only briefly permitted recruitment in Cameroon, and the main source of labour came to be Igbo smuggled in canoes from Calabar and Oron, Nigeria. The persisting labour shortage in the cacao, coffee and logging industries was only overcome by the mushrooming illegal canoe-based smuggling of Igbo and Ibibio workers from the Eastern Provinces of Nigeria. The number of clandestine contract workers on the island of Fernando Po grew to 20,000 in 1942. A labour treaty was signed in the same year, and a continuous stream of workers arrived in Spanish Guinea. It was this treaty which really permitted Fernando Po to become one of Africa's most productive agricultural areas after the Second World War. By 1968 there were almost 100,000 Nigerians in Spanish Guinea.

=== Spanish Civil War (1936–1939) ===
At the beginning of the Spanish Civil War, the colony remained loyal to the Republican government. On July 24, 1936, the Republican light cruiser Méndez Núñez arrived at Santa Isabel; on its way back to Spain the officers planned to join the rebellion, but the Spanish government, knowing this, ordered the ship to go back to the colony; on August 14 the Méndez Núñez was back in Fernando Po, where the sailors took control of her; on September 21 the ship arrived in Málaga (Republican Spain). On September 19 the Colonial Guard and the Civil Guard began the rebellion and took control of the island of Fernando Po, while the rest of the colony remained loyal to the Republic. On September 22 a clash took place between a rebel group from Kogo and a loyal detachment from Bata. Finally, on October 14 a force of 200 rebels arrived in the merchant Ciudad de Mahón and took control of Bata and the rest of the colony.

=== Provincialisation and decolonisation ===
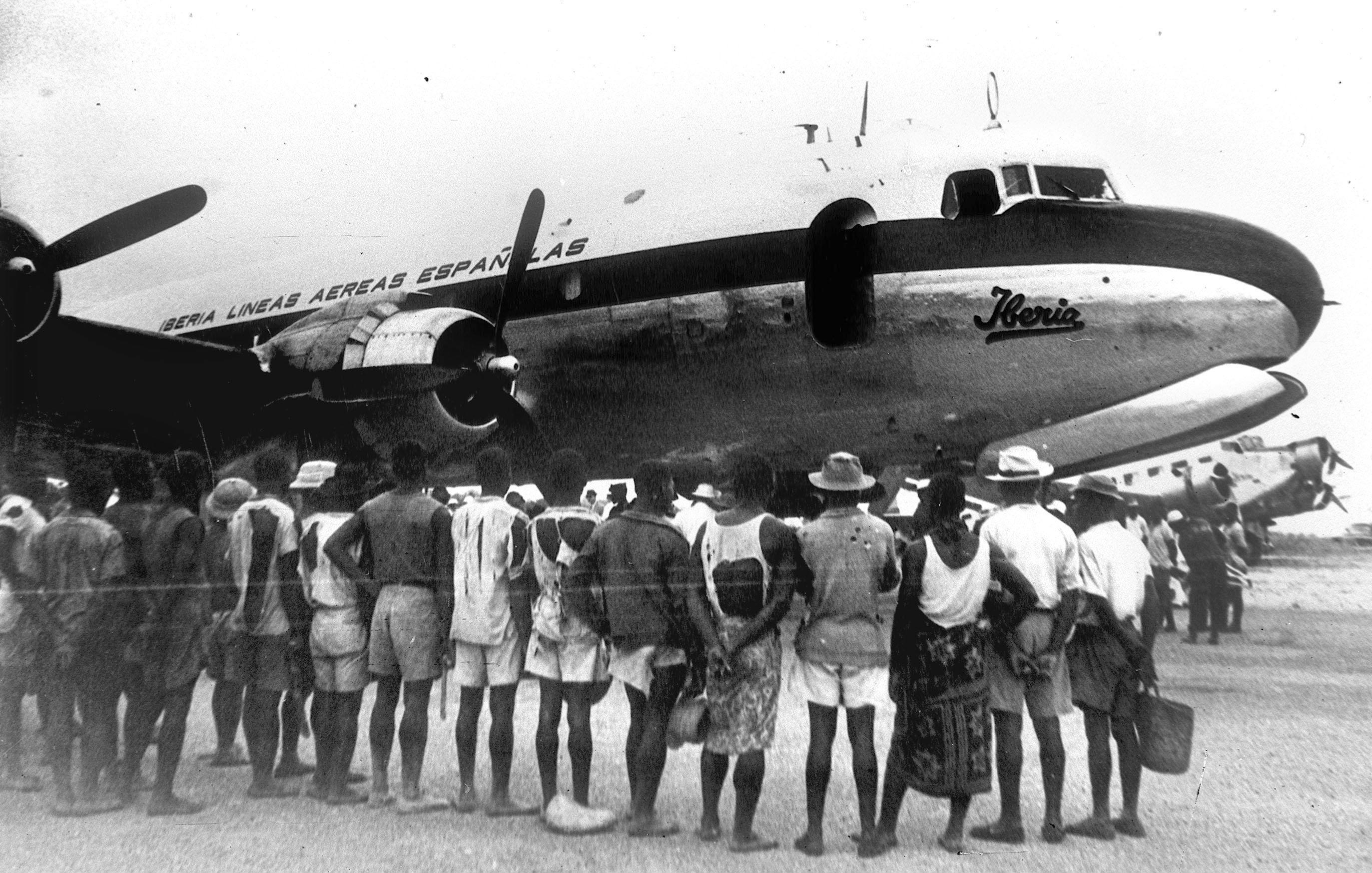
Inaugural flight with Iberia from Madrid to Bata, 1941.

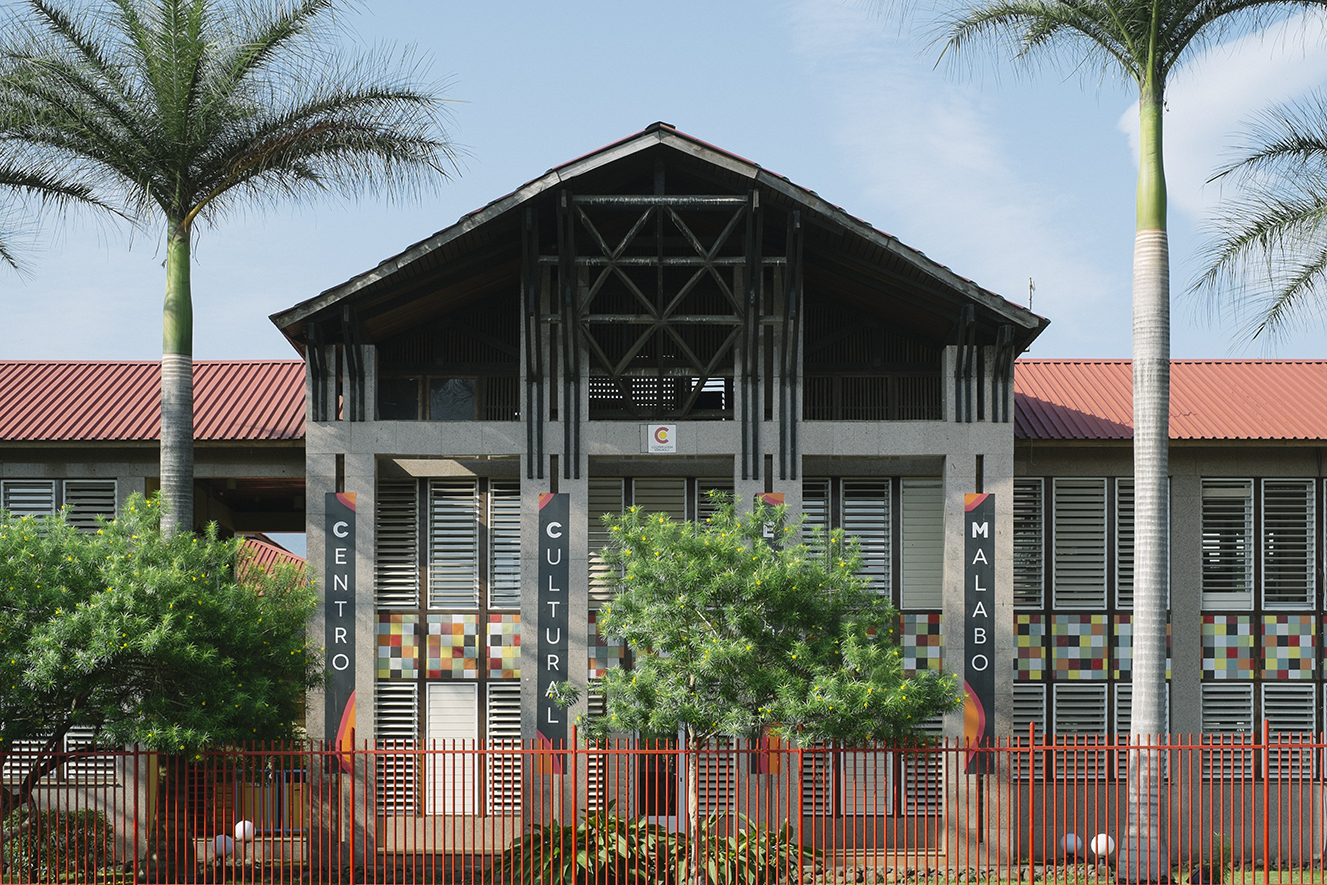
Centro Cultural de España (Cultural Center of Spain) in Malabo.

The post-war political history of the colony can be divided into three fairly distinct phases:

1. up to 1959, when its status was raised from 'colony' to 'province', taking a leaf out of the approach of the Portuguese Empire;
2. between 1960 and 1968, when Spain attempted a partial decolonisation which was hoped would conserve the territory as an integral segment of the Spanish system; and
3. after 1968, when the territory became an independent republic.

The first of these phases consisted of little more than a continuation of previous policies; these closely resembled the policies of Portugal and France, notably in dividing the population into a vast majority governed as 'natives' or non-citizens, and a very small minority (together with whites) admitted to civic status as emancipados, assimilation to the metropolitan culture being the only permissible means of advancement. The first local elections were held in 1959, and the first Equatoguinean representatives were seated in the Cortes Generales (Spanish parliament). Under the Basic Law of December 1963, limited autonomy was authorized under a joint legislative body for the territory's two provinces. A paradoxical effect of this autonomy was that Guineans could choose among several political parties while metropolitan Spaniards were under a single-party regime. The name of the country was changed to Equatorial Guinea. Although Spain's commissioner general had extensive powers, the Equatorial Guinean General Assembly had considerable initiative in formulating laws and regulations.

Nationalism began to emerge during this "provincial" phase, chiefly among small groups who had taken refuge from General Franco's dictatorship in Cameroon and Gabon. They formed two bodies: the Movimiento Nacional de Liberación de la Guinea (MONALIGE), and the Idea Popular de Guinea Ecuatorial (IPGE). Their pressures were weak, but the general trend in West Africa was not. A decision of 9 August 1963, approved by a referendum of 15 December 1963, introduced the territory to a measure of autonomy and the administrative promotion of a 'moderate' grouping, the Movimiento de Unión Nacional de la Guinea Ecuatorial (MUNGE). This proved a feeble instrument, and, with growing pressure for change from the UN, Spain gave way to the currents of nationalism. Independence was conceded on 12 October 1968 and the Republic of Equatorial Guinea came into being with Francisco Macías Nguema elected as president.

== Independence and Macias government (1968–1979) ==
In March 1968, under pressure from Equatoguinean nationalists and the United Nations, Spain announced that it would grant independence to Equatorial Guinea. A constitutional convention produced an electoral law and draft constitution.

In September 1968, Francisco Macías Nguema was elected first president of Equatorial Guinea, and independence was granted in October.

In July 1970, Macias creates a single-party state and by May 1971, key portions of the constitution were abrogated. In 1972 Macias took complete control of the government and assumed the title of President for Life. The Macias regime was characterized by human rights abuses, totalitarianism and the abandonment of all government functions except internal security, which was accomplished by terror; this led to the death or exile of up to one-third of the country's population. Due to pilferage, ignorance, and neglect, the country's infrastructure—electricity, water, road, transportation, and health—fell into ruin. The private and public sectors of the economy were devastated. Nigerian contract labourers on Bioko, estimated to have been 60,000, left en masse in early 1976. The economy collapsed, and skilled citizens and foreigners left.

In August 1979 Macias' nephew from Mongomo and former director of the infamous Black Beach prison, Teodoro Obiang Nguema Mbasogo, led a successful coup d'état; Macias was arrested, tried, and executed. Obiang assumed the presidency in October 1979. The islands were renamed Bioko and Annobón. The new ruler faced the challenge of restoring order in a country that was in shambles—by the end of Macias Nguema's dictatorship, the state coffers were empty and the population had been reduced to only one-third of what it was at independence.

== Obiang government (1979–present) ==
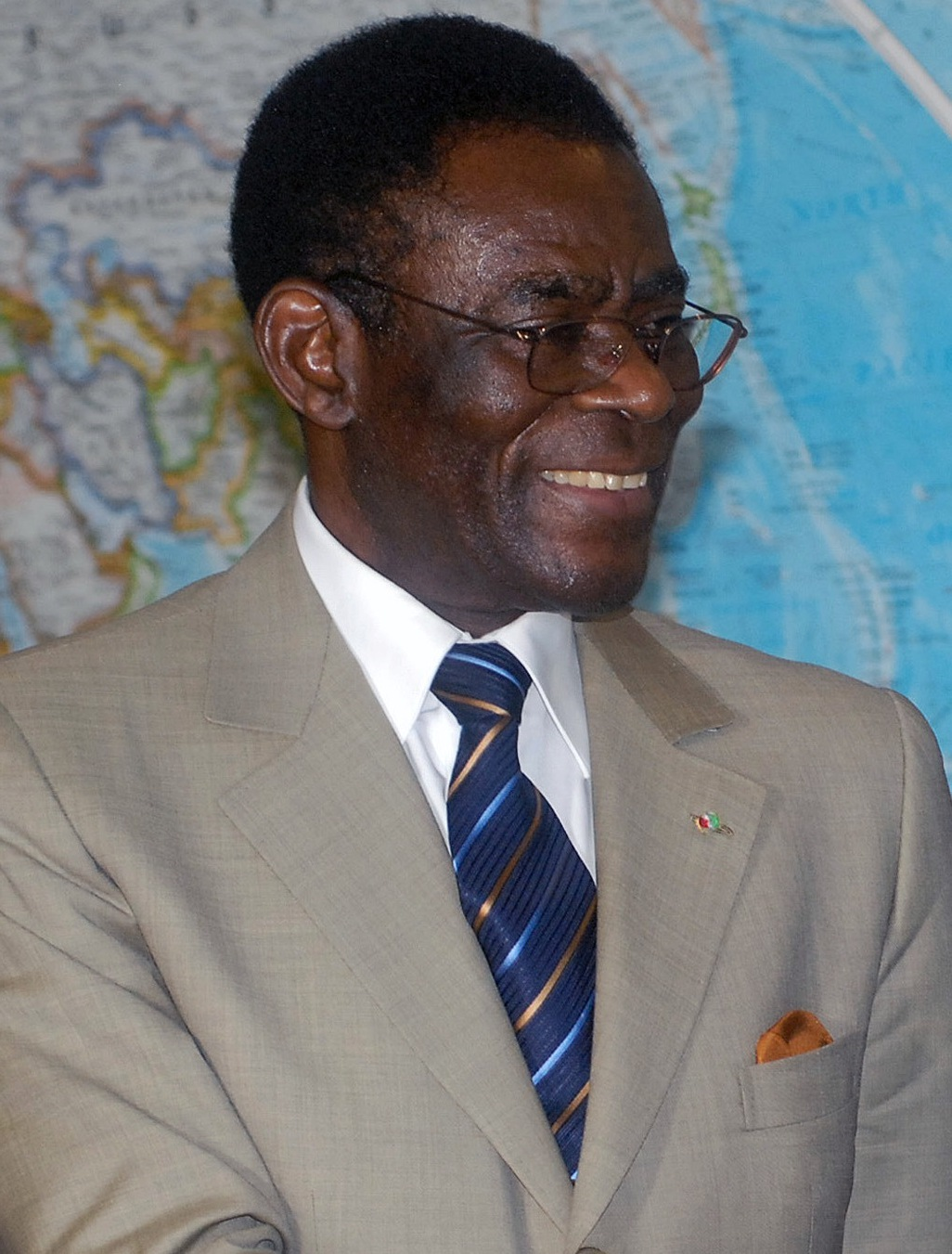
Teodoro Obiang, leader of Equatorial Guinea since 1979.

Although President Obiang signed a national anti-torture decree in 2006 to ban all forms of abuse and improper treatment in Equatorial Guinea and commissioned the renovation and modernization of Black Beach prison in 2007 to ensure the humane treatment of prisoners, human rights abuses continue. Human Rights Watch, Amnesty International and other non-governmental organizations have documented severe human rights abuses in prisons, including torture, beatings, unexplained deaths and illegal detention.

According to a March 2004 BBC profile, politics within the country are dominated by tensions between Obiang's son, Teodorin, and other close relatives with powerful positions in the security forces. The tension may be rooted in power shifts arising from the dramatic increase in oil production which has occurred since 1997.

The unsuccessful "Wonga Coup" by European and South African mercenaries in 2004 attempted to replace Obiang with a puppet ruler who would open the country's mineral wealth to the plotters. Simon Mann, a former officer in the SAS, led the plot, which also included former members of the South African Army 32 Battalion. Financial backers included Sir Mark Thatcher, son of former Prime Minister Margaret Thatcher and possibly the novelist Jeffrey Archer. Somewhere between $3 million and $20 million was expended on the failed coup, which has been claimed by some to have had the tacit support of some Western governments and international corporations.

In 2011, the government announced it was planning a new capital for the country, which was to be named Oyala but will be Djibloho – Ciudad de la Paz.

On March 7, 2021, there were munitions explosions at a military base near the city of Bata that resulted in 98 deaths and 600 people were injured and a/tending in hospital.

In November 2022 Teodoro Obiang was re-elected in 2022 Equatorial Guinean general election with 99.7% of the vote amidst accusations of fraud by the opposition.

In 2024 it was published that mercenaries from the Wagner Group (now called “Africa Corps”) had entered in Equatorial Guinea at the request of Teodoro Obiang. According to opponents, the objective of the mercenaries was to help consolidate a hypothetical succession of Obiang's power to his son "Teodorín".

On May 19, 2025, the International Court of Justice (ICJ) granted Equatorial Guinea sovereignty over Mbanie Island, Cocoteros Island, and Conga Island in response to territorial claims that neighboring Gabon had been making since 1972.

On 3 January 2026 Obiang officially declared Ciudad de la Paz as the countries new capital.
