= Prime Minister of Equatorial Guinea =

Prime minister of the Republic of Equatorial Guinea
- Primer ministro de la República de Guinea Ecuatorial (Spanish); Premier ministre de la République de Guinée-Équatoriale (French); Primeiro-ministro da República da Guiné Equatorial (Portuguese)
- Coat of arms of Equatorial Guinea

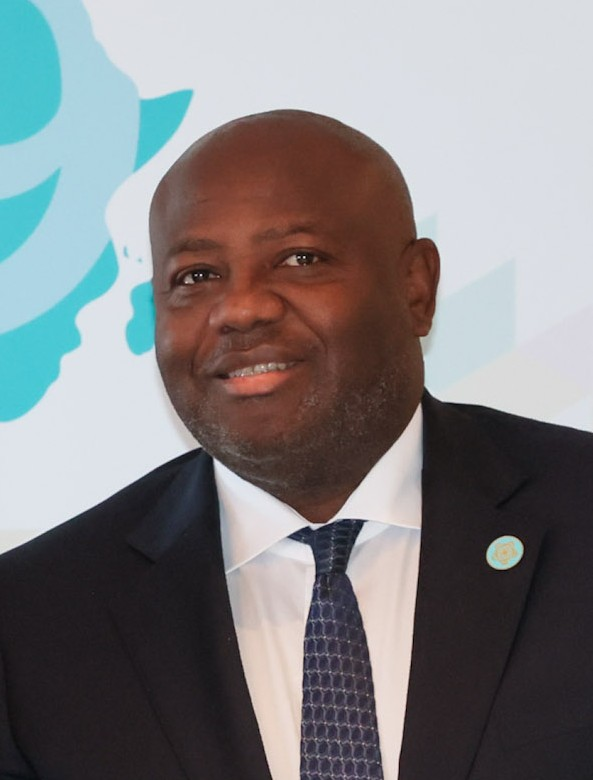
- Incumbent; Manuel Osa Nsue Nsua since 17 August 2024
- Executive branch of the Government of Equatorial Guinea
- Member of: Council of Ministers
- Residence: Malabo Government Building
- Appointer: President of Equatorial Guinea
- Term length: No term limit
- Constituting instrument: Constitution of Equatorial Guinea (1991)
- Formation: 15 August 1982; 44 years ago
- First holder: Cristino Seriche Bioko

The Prime Minister of the Government of Equatorial Guinea (Spanish: Primer Ministro del Gobierno de Guinea Ecuatorial; French: Premier ministre du gouvernement de la Guinée équatoriale; Portuguese: Primeiro-Ministro do Governo da Guiné Equatorial) is the head of government of the Republic of Equatorial Guinea. They are member of the Council of Ministers, which is chaired by the President of the Republic. The appointment of the Prime Minister is made by the President, and since incumbent President Teodoro Obiang Nguema Mbasogo came to power, all prime ministers have been affiliated with the ruling party, the Democratic Party of Equatorial Guinea (PDGE). Generally the post is responsible for administrative coordination within the country's government. The incumbent is Manuel Osa Nsue Nsua, having taken office on 17 August 2024.

== History ==
The name of the position used to be President of the Council of Autonomous Government during the time of Spanish Guinea. Bonifacio Ondó Edu was the first person to hold the preceding office of prime minister of Spanish Guinea, taking effect on 15 December 1963. After independence, the title was defunct until 1982, when it was restored and bestowed upon Cristino Seriche Bioko, an independent politician.

== Deputy ==
The principal deputy of the prime minister is the deputy prime minister, the possibility of having more than one deputy prime minister.

=== Current deputies ===
Title	Portfolio/Area of responsibility	Name
First Deputy Prime Minister	Ministry of Education, Higher Education and Sports	Clemente Engonga Nguema Onguene
Second Deputy Prime Minister	Relations with Parliament and Legal Affairs	Ángel Mesie Mibuy
Third Deputy Prime Minister	Human Rights	Alfonso Nsue Mokuy

== List of officeholders ==
Political parties

National Unity Movement of Equatorial Guinea (MUNGE)
Democratic Party of Equatorial Guinea (PDGE)

Other factions

Independent

=== Prime minister of Spanish Guinea (1963–1968) ===
No.	Portrait	Name (Birth–Death)	Election	Term of office			Political party
No.	Portrait	Name (Birth–Death)	Election	Took office	Left office	Time in office	Political party
1		Bonifacio Ondó Edú (1922–1969)	1964	15 December 1963	12 October 1968	4 years, 302 days	MUNGE

=== Prime ministers of Equatorial Guinea (1968–present) ===
No.	Portrait	Name (Birth–Death)	Election	Term of office			Political party	President
No.	Portrait	Name (Birth–Death)	Election	Took office	Left office	Time in office	Political party	President
Post abolished (12 October 1968 – 15 August 1982)								Teodoro Obiang
1		Cristino Seriche Bioko (1940–2024)	1983	15 August 1982	4 March 1992	9 years, 202 days	Independent (until 1987)	Teodoro Obiang
		Cristino Seriche Bioko (1940–2024)	1988	15 August 1982	4 March 1992	9 years, 202 days	PDGE	Teodoro Obiang
2		Silvestre Siale Bileka (born 1940)	1993	4 March 1992	1 April 1996	4 years, 28 days	PDGE	Teodoro Obiang
3		Ángel Serafín Seriche Dougan (born 1946)	1999	1 April 1996	4 March 2001	4 years, 337 days	PDGE	Teodoro Obiang
4		Cándido Muatetema Rivas (1960–2014)	2004	4 March 2001	11 July 2004	3 years, 129 days	PDGE	Teodoro Obiang
5		Miguel Abia Biteo Boricó (1961–2012)	—	11 July 2004	14 August 2006	2 years, 34 days	PDGE	Teodoro Obiang
6		Ricardo Mangue Obama Nfubea (born 1961)	2008	14 August 2006	8 July 2008	1 year, 329 days	PDGE	Teodoro Obiang
7		Ignacio Milam Tang (born 1940)	—	8 July 2008	21 May 2012	3 years, 318 days	PDGE	Teodoro Obiang
8		Vicente Ehate Tomi (born 1968)	2013	21 May 2012	23 June 2016	4 years, 33 days	PDGE	Teodoro Obiang
9		Francisco Pascual Obama Asue (born 1949)	2017; 2022	23 June 2016	1 February 2023	6 years, 223 days	PDGE	Teodoro Obiang
10		Manuela Roka Botey (born 1973)	—	1 February 2023	17 August 2024	1 year, 198 days	PDGE	Teodoro Obiang
11		Manuel Osa Nsue Nsua (born 1976)	—	17 August 2024	Incumbent	2 years, 86 days	PDGE	Teodoro Obiang

== See also ==
- Politics of Equatorial Guinea
- List of presidents of Equatorial Guinea
- Vice President of Equatorial Guinea
- List of colonial governors of Spanish Guinea
