= Elections in Equatorial Guinea =

Equatorial Guinea elects on the national level a head of state – the president – and a legislature. The president is elected for a seven-year term by the people. President Teodoro Obiang Nguema Mbasogo was re-elected unopposed on 15 December 2002. The Chamber of Deputies (Chambre des députés) has 100 members, elected for a five-year term by proportional representation in multi-member constituencies.

Equatorial Guinea is a dominant-party state. This means that only one political party, the Democratic Party of Equatorial Guinea (PDGE), is de facto allowed to hold effective power. Although minor parties are de jure allowed to rule, they are de facto required to accept the leadership of the dominant party. According to Freedom House, Equatoguinean elections are "neither free nor fair."

== Latest elections ==
The official government website announced on 21 November 2022 that after a preliminary count, the PDGE had won over 99.7% of the votes so far counted. It was therefore suspected by many news agencies and journalists that this election would be a landslide "victory" for incumbent Obiang, just as every presidential election in Equatorial Guinea since their post-coup reintroduction in 1989. The United States said that it had "serious doubts about the credibility of the announced results" of the election.

=== President ===
The government announced on 26 November 2022 that Obiang had won the election by an overwhelming margin, as expected. It stated that provisional results showed him with 97% of the vote on a turnout of 98%. The official numbers included a few mistakes including the total electorate or the number of valid votes.

Candidate	Party	Votes	%
Teodoro Obiang Nguema Mbasogo	Democratic Party of Equatorial Guinea	405,910	97.00
Andrés Esono Ondó	Convergence for Social Democracy	9,684	2.31
Buenaventura Monsuy Asumu	Party of the Social Democratic Coalition	2,855	0.68
Total		418,449	100.00
Valid votes		418,449	99.50
Invalid votes		1,278	0.30
Blank votes		804	0.19
Total votes		420,531	100.00
Registered voters/turnout		427,671	98.33
Source: Government of Equatorial Guinea

=== Chamber of Deputies ===
The PDGE won all seats in parliament and in all municipal assemblies according to official results as well.

Party	Votes	%	Seats	+/–
Democratic Party of Equatorial Guinea			100	+1
Convergence for Social Democracy			0	New
Party of the Social Democratic Coalition			0	New
Total			100	0
Registered voters/turnout	427,671	–		
Source: Government of Equatorial Guinea

=== Senate ===
Party	Votes	%	Seats	+/–
Democratic Party of Equatorial Guinea			55	0
Convergence for Social Democracy			0	New
Party of the Social Democratic Coalition			0	New
Total			55	0
Registered voters/turnout	427,671	–		
Source: Government of Equatorial Guinea

== See also ==
- Electoral calendar
- Electoral system
