= 1999 Equatorial Guinean parliamentary election =

- 7 March 1999
- All 80 seats in the Chamber of Deputies; 41 seats needed for a majority
- Turnout: 94.94% (▲27.45pp)
Party	Leader	Vote %	Seats	+/–
PDGE	Teodoro Obiang Nguema Mbasogo	85.52	75	+7
UPGE	Daniel Martínez Ayecaba	6.41	4	New
CPDS	Plácido Micó Abogo	5.30	1	New
This lists parties that won seats. See the complete results below.
Prime Minister before	Prime Minister after
Ángel Serafín Seriche Dougan; PDGE	Ángel Serafín Seriche Dougan; PDGE

Parliamentary elections were held in Equatorial Guinea on 7 March 1999. They were won by the Democratic Party of Equatorial Guinea of President Teodoro Obiang Nguema Mbasogo, which took 75 of the 80 seats in the Chamber of People's Representatives.

== Results ==
Party	Votes	%	Seats	+/–
Democratic Party of Equatorial Guinea	156,949	85.52	75	+7
Popular Union of Equatorial Guinea	11,771	6.41	4	New
Convergence for Social Democracy	9,735	5.30	1	New
Other parties and independents	5,073	2.76	0	–
Total	183,528	100.00	80	0
Valid votes	183,528	99.63		
Invalid/blank votes	690	0.37		
Total votes	184,218	100.00		
Registered voters/turnout	194,036	94.94		
Source: African Elections Database
