= 1993 Equatorial Guinean parliamentary election =

- 21 November 1993
- All 80 seats in the Chamber of Deputies; 41 seats needed for a majority
- Turnout: 67.49%
Party	Leader	Vote %	Seats	+/–
PDGE	Teodoro Obiang Nguema Mbasogo	69.79	68	+8
CSDP	Secundino Oyono Aguong Ada	10.28	6	New
UDS	Carmelo Modu Akuse Bindang	7.36	5	New
PL	Santos Pascual Bikomo Nanguande	6.36	1	New
This lists parties that won seats. See the complete results below.
Prime Minister before	Prime Minister after
Silvestre Siale Bileka; PDGE	Silvestre Siale Bileka; PDGE

Parliamentary elections were held in Equatorial Guinea on 21 November 1993. They were the first multi-party elections in the country since the pre-independence elections of 1968. Although seven parties were allowed to run in the election, the ruling Democratic Party of Equatorial Guinea (PDGE) maintained its grip on power, winning 68 of the 80 seats in the enlarged Chamber of People's Representatives. According to official figures, voter turnout was 67%. The Joint Opposition Platform, an alliance of eight opposition parties, called for a boycott and claimed voter turnout was as low as 20%.

The alliance's leaders were prevented from travelling to the mainland to campaign for the boycott and some were banned from leaving the country. Following the election, the Spanish Foreign Minister Javier Solana claimed the elections were not free and fair, an opinion shared by other observers.

== Results ==
Party	Votes	%	Seats	+/–
Democratic Party of Equatorial Guinea	54,589	69.79	68	+8
Social Democratic and Popular Convergence	8,042	10.28	6	New
Social Democratic Union	5,760	7.36	5	New
Liberal Party	4,974	6.36	1	New
Liberal Democratic Convention	1,963	2.51	0	New
Socialist Party of Equatorial Guinea	1,106	1.41	0	New
Social Democratic Party	909	1.16	0	New
National Democratic Union of Equatorial Guinea	880	1.12	0	New
Total	78,223	100.00	80	+20
Valid votes	78,223	99.35		
Invalid/blank votes	512	0.65		
Total votes	78,735	100.00		
Registered voters/turnout	116,666	67.49		
Source: Nohlen et al.

There was a difference of one vote between the party totals and the official number of valid votes (78,224).
