= Socialist Party of Equatorial Guinea =

Partido Socialista de Guinea Ecuatorial
- President: Tomás Mecheba Fernández
- Founded: 1986
- Ideology: Democratic socialism
- Political position: Center-left

The Socialist Party of Equatorial Guinea (Partido Socialista de Guinea Ecuatorial, usually abbreviated as PSGE) is an Equatorial Guinean political party.

== History ==
The PSEG was founded in 1986 by exiled Equatorial Guineans in Spain, led by Tomás Mecheba Fernández and Andrés Esono Ondó. According to the historian Donato Ndongo-Bidyogo, the founding of the party was supported by the Spanish Socialist Workers' Party.

The party began its political activity following the introduction of multi party politics in Equatorial Guinea in 1990. It was established as an opposition to Teodoro Obiang Nguema Mbasogo, briefly joining the Joint Opposition Platform. The party suggested foreign military intervention to end the human rights violations under the Obiang government. The first election involving the PSEG took place in the 1993 Equatorial Guinean parliamentary election, ending with poor results.

However, during the early 2000s, the PSEG softened its oppositional stance toward the Obiang regime gradually integrating into the government. After running in the 2004 Equatorial Guinean parliamentary election and once again performingly poorly, the SPEG also began to participate in elections alongside other opposition parties in a coalition against the ruling Democratic Party of Equatorial Guinea for both legislative and presidential elections.

In May 2012, the leader of the PSGE, Tomás Mecheba Fernández, was appointed Minister of Prevention and Control of HIV/AIDS and Sexually Transmitted Diseases. In May 2016, he moved to the position of Minister of Tourism.
