= 2013 Equatorial Guinean parliamentary election =

- 26 May 2013
- Chamber of Deputies
- All 100 seats in the Chamber of Deputies; 51 seats needed for a majority
Party	Leader	Seats	+/–
PDGE	Teodoro Obiang Nguema Mbasogo	99	+10
CPDS	Andres Esono Ondo	1	0
This lists parties that won seats. See the complete results below.
- Senate
- 55 of 70 seats in the Senate; 28 seats needed for a majority
Party	Leader	Seats
PDGE	Teodoro Obiang Nguema Mbasogo	54
CPDS	Andres Esono Ondo	1
This lists parties that won seats. See the complete results below.
Prime Minister before	Prime Minister after
Vicente Ehate Tomi; PDGE	Vicente Ehate Tomi; PDGE

Parliamentary elections were held in Equatorial Guinea on 26 May 2013, alongside local elections. Following constitutional reforms approved in a 2011 referendum, they were the first elections in which the newly established Senate was elected. The ruling Democratic Party of Equatorial Guinea won all but one seat in both houses of Parliament. The only opposition party represented was the Convergence for Social Democracy, which won 1 seat in each chamber. The "Democratic Opposition" bloc, minor allies of the ruling party which placed a combined second in 2004 and 2008, did not contest this election separately.

== Electoral system ==
The 100 members of the Chamber of People's Representatives were elected by closed list proportional representation in multi-member constituencies.

The Senate had 70 members, of which 55 were elected and 15 appointed by President Teodoro Obiang Nguema Mbasogo.

== Results ==
=== Senate ===
Party	Seats
Democratic Party of Equatorial Guinea	54
Convergence for Social Democracy	1
Appointed members	15
Total	70
Source: Government of Equatorial Guinea

=== Chamber of Deputies ===
Party	Seats	+/–
Democratic Party of Equatorial Guinea	99	+10
Convergence for Social Democracy	1	0
Total	100	0
Source: Government of Equatorial Guinea
