= Andrés Esono Ondó =

Equatoguinean politician

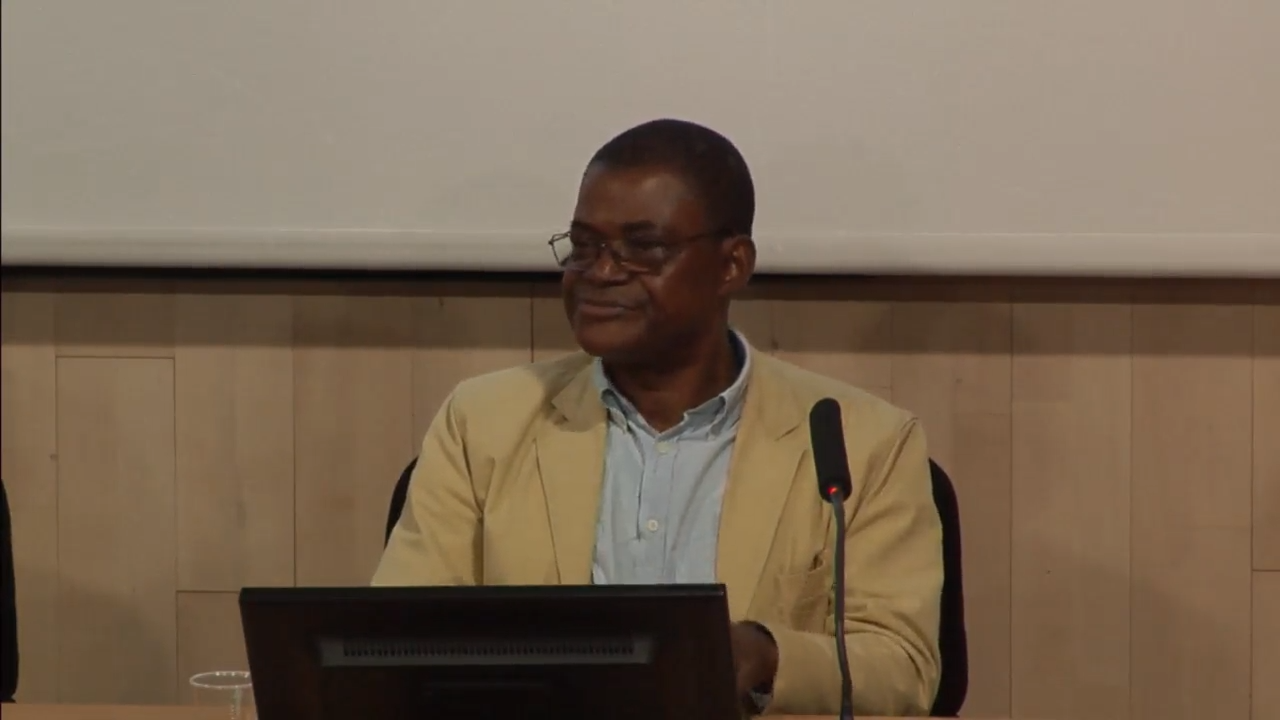
- Born: 4 February 1961 (age 65); Añiso, Equatorial Guinea
- Education: Complutense University of Madrid

Andrés Esono Ondó Okogo (Añisoc, February 4, 1961) is a politician and academic of Equatorial Guinea, and the general secretary of the Convergence for Social Democracy (Equatorial Guinea) (CSD).

He has a degree of sociology from the Universidad Complutense de Madrid and has a Political Science degree from Universidad Nacional de Educación a Distancia. He taught at Colegio Español de Malabo and in other colleges He has worked as a national consultant for the World Bank and three United Nations agencies; UNICEF, United Nations Population Fund, and United Nations Development Programme.

He began his political career in 1986 as a founding member of the Socialist Party of Equatorial Guinea. In 1992, he abandoned the party and merged with the Convergence for Social Democracy (Equatorial Guinea), serving as Secretary of Communication as well as being part of the National Executive Committee.

In the 2013 Equatorial Guinean parliamentary election, he was elected as city councilor of Malabo.

In December 2013, he was elected as the Secretary General of the CSD, succeeding Plácido Micó Abogo.

For the 2017 Equatorial Guinean parliamentary election, he ran for a seat in the National Parliament, but was not elected.

In 2019, he was arrested in Chad under accusations of plotting a coup against Teodoro Obiang Nguema Mbasogo.

In October 2022, Ondó announced his presidential candidacy for the 2022 Equatorial Guinean general election. In the elections, he obtained 2.31% of the votes and denounced it as fraudulent.

He is married and has three children.
