= Celestino Bonifacio Bacalé =

Equatorial-Guinean politician (1957–2021)

Minister of Labor in Equatorial Guinea
- In office 2018-2020

Minister of Transport in Equatorial Guinea
- In office 2015-2018

Minister of Trade and Commerce in Equatorial Guinea
- In office 2012-2015

Member of the Chamber of Deputies
- In office 2004-?

Secretary of International Relations and Cooperation of the Convergence for Social Democracy
- In office December 1994 - ?

Personal details
- Born: 24 September 1957
- Died: 2 March 2021 (aged 63) Douala, Cameroon
- Party: Convergence for Social Democracy

Celestino Bonifacio Bacalé Obiang (24 September 1957 – 2 March 2021) was an Equatoguinean politician. He was the Secretary of International Relations and Cooperation of the Convergence for Social Democracy (CPDS).

== Biography ==
Bacalé was a founding member of the CPDS and was the Secretary of Information and Propaganda of the CPDS Provisional Executive Committee during the early 1990s. After copies of the CPDS paper La Verdad, which he and Plácido Micó Abogo wanted sent to Spain, were intercepted at the airport in Malabo in February 1992, Bacalé was among those arrested. When the party held its Constitutive Congress in December 1994, Bacalé became Secretary of International Relations.

Bacalé was the CPDS candidate in the December 2002 presidential election; Micó Abogo, the party's leader, was imprisoned at the time. Complaining of voter fraud, Bacalé withdrew his candidacy on the day of the election. Along with Micó Abogo, he was one of two CPDS candidates elected to the Chamber of Deputies in the April 2004 parliamentary election. He and Micó Abogo won their seats from Malabo, the capital.

At the Third National Congress of the CPDS, held in Bata on 28–30 January 2005, Bacalé was re-elected to his post on CPDS National Executive Committee as Secretary for International Relations and Cooperation, however he joined the Democratic Party of Equatorial Guinea as a member of the Executive Board

Bacalé served as Minister of Trade and Commerce from 2012 until 2015 and Minister of Transport from 2015 to 2018. From 2018 to 2020, he served as Minister of Labor.

Bacalé died in Cameroon at a clinic in Douala as a result of COVID-19.
