= 2022 Equatorial Guinean general election =

- 20 November 2022
- Presidential election
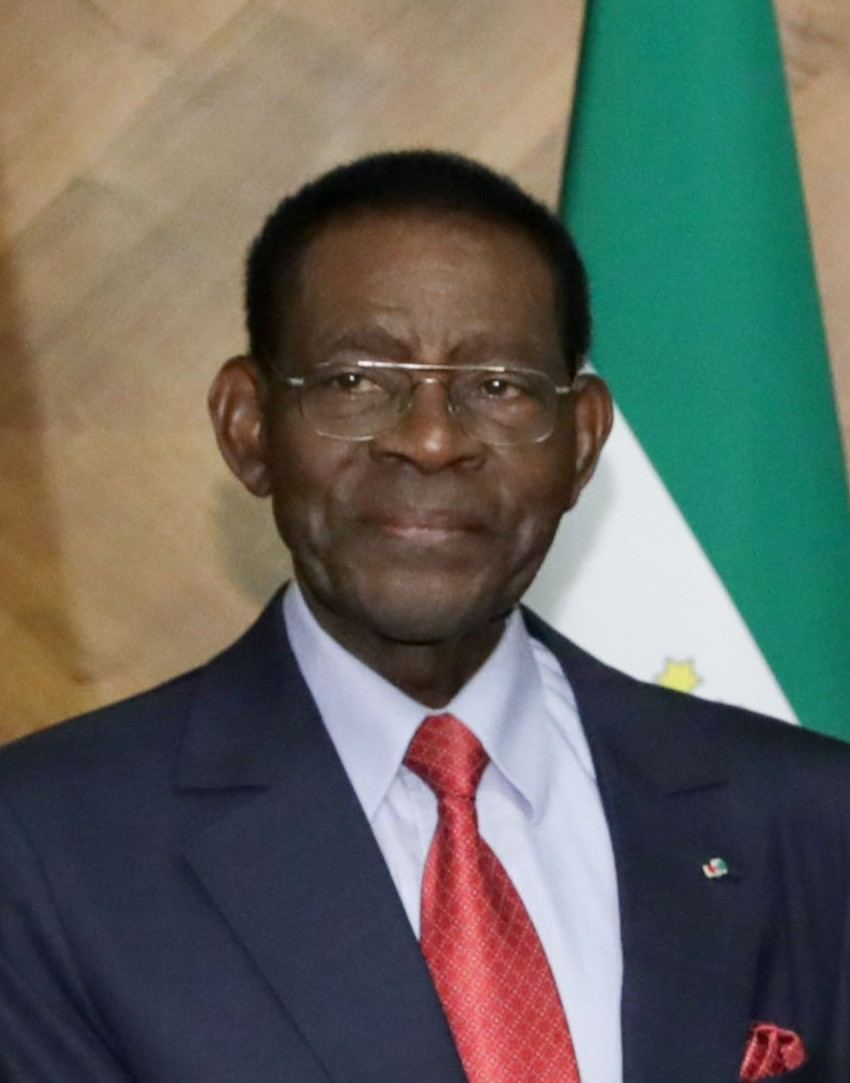

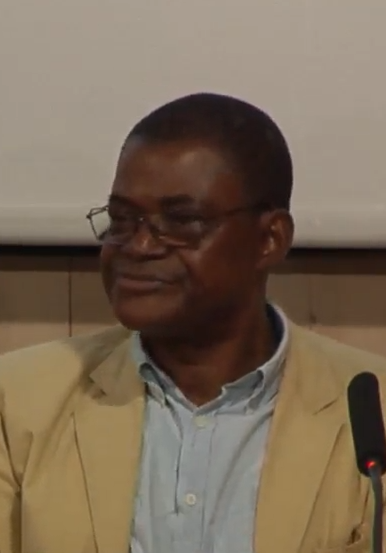
Nominee	Teodoro Obiang Nguema	Andrés Esono Ondó
Party	PDGE	CPDS
Popular vote	405,910	9,684
Percentage	97.00%	2.31%
President before election
Teodoro Obiang Nguema Mbasogo
PDGE
Elected President
Teodoro Obiang Nguema Mbasogo
PDGE
- Chamber of Deputies election
Party	Leader	Seats	+/–
PDGE	Teodoro Obiang Nguema Mbasogo	100	+1
This lists parties that won seats. See the complete results below.
- Senate election
Party	Leader	Seats	+/–
PDGE	Teodoro Obiang Nguema Mbasogo	55	0
This lists parties that won seats. See the complete results below.

General elections were held in Equatorial Guinea on 20 November 2022 to elect the President and members of Parliament, alongside local elections. Originally the parliamentary elections had been scheduled for November 2022 and presidential elections for 2023. However, in September 2022 Parliament approved a proposal to merge the elections due to economic constraints. The government announced on 26 November 2022 that Obiang had won the election by an overwhelming margin, as expected. It stated that provisional results showed him with 97% of the vote on a turnout of 98%. The elections were considered a sham by international observers.

== Background ==
After becoming independent from Spain in 1968, Equatorial Guinea was ruled by President for life Francisco Macías Nguema until he was overthrown in a coup in 1979 by his nephew Teodoro Obiang Nguema Mbasogo, who has served as the country's president since. Both have widely been characterised as corrupt dictators.

Equatorial Guinea's government is authoritarian and has one of the worst human rights records in the world, consistently ranking among the "worst of the worst" in Freedom House's annual survey of political and civil rights. Reporters Without Borders ranks President Obiang among its "predators" of press freedom.

Political opposition, though nominally allowed alongside a nominal multi-party system, is effectively nonexistent, with President Obiang loyalists holding a supermajority of seats in the legislature since his installation as leader, and Obiang has regularly "won" elections with over 90% of the vote. No election has been described as free or fair in the country. Human Rights Watch and Amnesty International among other non-governmental organizations have documented severe human rights abuses including illegal detention, with prisoners subjected to tactics including torture and beatings. Unexplained deaths have also been reported.

== Electoral system ==
The president is elected using the first-past-the-post system.

The 100 members of the Chamber of Deputies are elected by closed-list proportional representation from multi-member constituencies based on the 19 districts with an electoral threshold of 10%. Of the 70 members of the Senate, 55 are elected from the same 19 electoral districts also by closed-list proportional representation and with an electoral threshold of 10%. An additional 15 members are appointed.

Districts in Equatorial Guinea
District	Chamber	Senate
Malabo	10	6
Baney	4	2
Luba	4	3
Riaba	2	1
Annobón	3	1
Bata	10	6
Mbini	4	2
Cogo	4	3
Evinayong	8	4
Niefang	6	3
Akurenam	4	2
Mongomo	8	4
Añisok	6	3
Nsork	3	2
Akonibe	4	2
Djibloho	1	1
Ebebiyin	9	5
Mikomeseng	6	3
Nsok-Nsomo	4	2
Total	100	55

== Presidential candidates ==
On Friday, 14 October, the National Electoral Commission (CEN) announced all the candidates who will participate the November elections. For the presidential election, there were three candidates including incumbent President Obiang, but the legal and practical political system heavily favors Obiang and he personally controls all media.

Obiang was elected as the presidential candidate of the ruling Democratic Party of Equatorial Guinea (PDGE) at a party convention on 23 September. Obiang's eldest son, incumbent Vice President Teodorin Nguema Obiang, had previously sought the party's nomination. The Africa Report describes the compromise that was reached whereby Obiang would seek re-election and then step down after some years, allowing Teodorin to complete the term before facing election.

Buenaventura Monsuy Asumu, a sitting Senator who has run in the previous three elections, is the candidate of the Party of the Social Democratic Coalition (PCSD). The PCSD is allied with the ruling PDGE for the legislative and municipal elections.

Andrés Esono Ondó of the Convergence for Social Democracy (CPDS) party is the sole opposition candidate. He is participating for the first time.

== Results ==
The official government website announced on 21 November 2022 that after a preliminary count, the PDGE had won over 99.7% of the votes so far counted. It was therefore suspected by many news agencies and journalists that this election would be a landslide "victory" for incumbent Obiang, just as every presidential election in Equatorial Guinea since their post-coup reintroduction in 1989. The United States said that it had "serious doubts about the credibility of the announced results" of the election.

=== President ===
The government announced on 26 November 2022 that Obiang had won the election by an overwhelming margin, as expected. It stated that provisional results showed him with 97% of the vote on a turnout of 98%. The official numbers included a few mistakes including the total electorate or the number of valid votes.

Candidate	Party	Votes	%
Teodoro Obiang Nguema Mbasogo	Democratic Party of Equatorial Guinea	405,910	97.00
Andrés Esono Ondó	Convergence for Social Democracy	9,684	2.31
Buenaventura Monsuy Asumu	Party of the Social Democratic Coalition	2,855	0.68
Total		418,449	100.00
Valid votes		418,449	99.50
Invalid votes		1,278	0.30
Blank votes		804	0.19
Total votes		420,531	100.00
Registered voters/turnout		427,671	98.33
Source: Government of Equatorial Guinea

=== Chamber of Deputies ===
The PDGE won all seats in parliament and in all municipal assemblies according to official results as well.

Party	Votes	%	Seats	+/–
Democratic Party of Equatorial Guinea			100	+1
Convergence for Social Democracy			0	New
Party of the Social Democratic Coalition			0	New
Total			100	0
Registered voters/turnout	427,671	–		
Source: Government of Equatorial Guinea

=== Senate ===
Party	Votes	%	Seats	+/–
Democratic Party of Equatorial Guinea			55	0
Convergence for Social Democracy			0	New
Party of the Social Democratic Coalition			0	New
Total			55	0
Registered voters/turnout	427,671	–		
Source: Government of Equatorial Guinea
