= Evangelina Oyo Ebule =

Equatorial Guinean politician

Evangelina Oyo Ebule is an Equatorial Guinean politician who served as the country's Minister of Justice, Worship and Penitentiary Institutions.

== Political career ==
Ebule has a law degree from Madrid. In 1989, she was appointed to the Guinean Supreme Court of Justice.

By 1998, Ebule was the Vice Minister of Justice and Worship in President Teodoro Obiang's government. In January 2003, Ebule was reconfirmed to this role during the investiture of President Obiang following his victory in the 2002 presidential elections. In 2008, she was made the Cabinet Minister for Labour and Social Security. In 2013, she was made the Cabinet Minister for Justice, Worship and Penitentiary Institutions. In this role, she has turned down the demands of opposition groups to legalize the formation of new political parties. As Justice Minister, Ebule was part of the effort to passing legislation to abolish the death penalty in Equatorial Guinea. The death penalty was abolished in 2016.

Ebule is a member of the ruling Democratic Party of Equatorial Guinea. In July 2017 at the closing session of the 6th Ordinary National Congress, she was named one of four vice-presidents of the party.
