= Cristino Seriche Bioko =

Equatoguinean politician (1940–2024)

Cristino Seriche
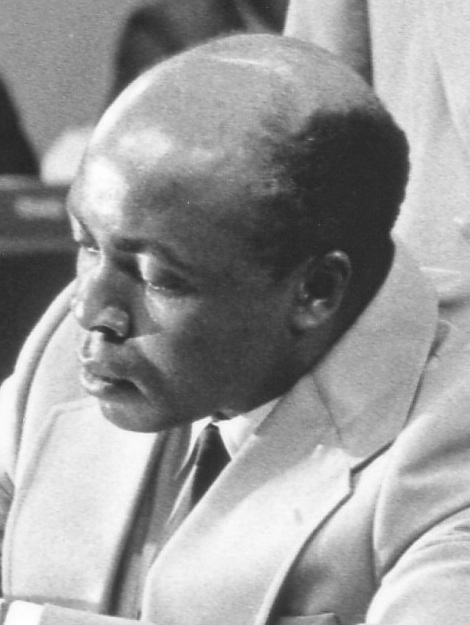
- Seriche in 1979

Prime Minister of Equatorial Guinea
- In office 15 August 1982 – 4 March 1992
- President: Teodoro Obiang
- Preceded by: position established
- Succeeded by: Silvestre Siale

Personal details
- Born: Cristino Seriche Bioko; 15 June 1940 Bata, Spanish Guinea
- Died: 11 June 2024 (aged 83) Sipopo, Equatorial Guinea
- Party: PDGE

Cristino Seriche Malabo Bioko (15 June 1940 – 11 June 2024) was an Equatoguinean soldier and politician who was the prime minister of Equatorial Guinea from 15 August 1982 to 4 March 1992. He previously served as vice president under Teodoro Obiang Nguema Mbasogo for almost one year, from December 1981 to until the position was abolished in October 1982 according to the constitutional referendum, at which point he became president.

== Biography ==
He was a member of the Bubi people. Like Teodoro Obiang Nguema Mbasogo, he attended the General Military Academy in Zaragoza.

During the dictatorship of Francisco Macías Nguema he served as governor of Bioko Island, formerly known as Fernando Pó, but in 1975 he was removed from the role and imprisoned in the Playa Negra prison.

In 1979 he participated alongside Obiang and other soldiers in the coup d'état that overthrew the dictator Francisco Macías Nguema, during whose regime Seriche Bioko was imprisoned in the Playa Negra prison.

In 1982, after a new constitution came into force, Seriche Bioko assumed the position of prime minister of Equatorial Guinea, operating with limited power alongside Obiang, who was president. After the Democratic Party of Equatorial Guinea was founded by President Obiang in 1987, Seriche Bioko joined it as did almost all politicians in the country. In those years, he was also a party deputy in the House of People's Representatives. He served as prime minister until March 4, 1992.

He later fell into disgrace and went into exile in Spain. At the end of 2004 he founded the opposition party "Vanguardia por la Defensa de los Derechos de Ciudadanos".

He died on 11 June 2024, at the age of 83.
