= Ministry of Justice (Equatorial Guinea) =

Government ministry of Equatorial Guinea

The Ministry of Justice, Worship and Penitentiary Institutions of Equatorial Guinea handles responsibilities such as overseeing the country's bar association, creating judicial rules and procedures, and investigating human rights issues.

== List of ministers (Post-1968 upon achieving independence) ==
- Jesus Eworo Ndongo (1968-1969)
- Rafael Obiang Nsogo (1970-1971)
- Expedito Rafael Momo Bakara (1972-1973)
- Leoncio Placido Conte May (1974-1975) [referred to as the Vice Minister of Justice]
- Okori Dougan Kinson (1976-1979)
- Policarpo Mansu Mba (1980-1981)
- Alfredo King Tomas (1982)
- Celestino Mansogo Nsi (1983-1984)
- Angel Ndongo Micha (1985-1990)
- Silvestre Siale Bileka (1990-1992)
- Mariano Nsue Nguema (1992-1994)
- Francisco Javier Ngomo Mbengono (1994-1998) [also referred to as the Vice Minister of Justice & Religious Affairs]
- Ruben Maye Nsue (1999-2004)
- Angle Masii Mibuy (2004-2006)
- Mauricio Bokung Asumu (2006-2008)
- Salvador Ondo Nkumu (2008-2011)
- Francisco Javier Ngomo Mbenono (2011-2014)
- Evangelina Oyo Ebule (2014-2018)
- Salvador Ondo Nkumu (2018–present)

== See also ==
- Equatorial Guinea Bar Association
- Justice ministry
- Politics of Equatorial Guinea
