= Popular Action of Equatorial Guinea =

Political party in Equatorial Guinea

Popular Action of Equatorial Guinea Acción Popular de Guinea Ecuatorial
- President: Carmelo Mba Bacale
- Founded: 1990
- Ideology: Christian democracy
- Political position: Centre
- International affiliation: Centrist Democrat International

The Popular Action of Equatorial Guinea (Spanish: Acción Popular de Guinea Ecuatorial) is a political party in Equatorial Guinea. It is led by Carmelo Mba Bacalé. It is currently one of many opposition parties in the country banned by the ruling party, the Democratic Party of Equatorial Guinea, in power since 1979.

Bacalé gained 0.16% of the country's vote for the AP in the 2009 Equatoguinean presidential election.

== Electoral history ==
=== Presidential elections ===
Election	Party candidate	Votes	%	Result
1996	Did not contest			
2002	Did not contest			
2009	Carmelo Mba Bacale	437	0.16%	Lost ✗
2016	Carmelo Mba Bacale	2,415	0.83%	Lost ✗
