= Politics of Equatorial Guinea =

The politics of Equatorial Guinea take place under an authoritarian regime where power has been centralized under President Teodoro Obiang Nguema since he seized power in a 1979 coup against his uncle, Francisco Macías Nguema. The regime party, Partido democrático de guinea ecuatorial, is the dominant party in Equatorial Guinea politics. The structure of Nguema's regime has varied over time. Initially, it was a military dictatorship before transforming into a single-party state before most recently becoming competitive authoritarian.

Elections take place in Equatorial Guinea but they are neither free nor fair. The political opposition is either repressed or co-opted by the Nguema regime.

Corruption is widespread in Equatorial Guinea where members of the Nguema regime enrich themself on Equatorial Guinea's substantial oil wealth.

Nominally, the politics Equatorial Guinea takes place in a framework of a presidential republic, whereby the President is both the head of state and head of government. Executive power is exercised by the government. Legislative power is vested in both the government and the Chamber of People's Representatives

== Political conditions ==
A great deal of political party activity ensued when Equatorial Guinea attained autonomy from Spain in 1963. Bubi and Fernandino parties on the island preferred separation from Río Muni or a loose federation. Ethnically based parties in Río Muni favored independence for a united country comprising Bioko and Río Muni, an approach that was adopted. The Movement for the Self-Determination of Bioko Island (MAIB), which advocates independence for the island under Bubi control, is one of the offshoots of the era immediately preceding independence.

Equatorial Guinea became independent from Spain on October 12, 1968. Since then, the country has had two presidents: Francisco Macías Nguema, who had been the mayor of Mongomo under the Spanish colonial government, and Teodoro Obiang Nguema Mbasogo Macías's nephew, who has ruled since 1979, when he staged a military coup d'état and executed his uncle. When Macías came to power, political activity largely ceased. Opposition figures among the exile communities in Spain and elsewhere agitated for reforms; some of them had been employed in the Macías and Obiang governments. After political activities in Equatorial Guinea were legalized in the early 1990s, some opposition leaders returned to test the waters, but repressive actions have continued sporadically.

The 1982 Constitution gives Obiang extensive powers, including the right to name, and dismiss, members of the cabinet. The 1982 constitution also give him the power to make laws by decree, dissolve the Chamber of Representatives, negotiate and ratify international treaties, and calling legislative elections. Obiang retained his role as commander-in-chief of the armed forces and minister of defense when he became president and he maintains close supervision of military activity. The Prime Minister is appointed by the President and operates under powers designated by the president. The prime minister coordinates government activities in areas other than foreign affairs, national defense and security.

With the prodding of the United Nations, the United States, Spain, and other donor countries, the government undertook an electoral census in 1995 and held freely contested municipal elections, the country's first, in September. Most observers agree that these elections were relatively free and transparent and also that the opposition parties garnered between 2/3 and 3/4 of the total vote. The government delayed announcing the results, then claimed a highly dubious overall 52% victory, and capture of 19 of the 27 municipal councils. The council of Malabo, the capital, went to the opposition however. In early January 1996 Obiang called presidential elections, to be held in six weeks. The campaign was marred by allegations of fraud, and most of the other candidates withdrew in the final week. Obiang claimed re-election with 98% of the vote. International observers agreed the election was neither free nor fair. In an attempt to mollify his critics, Obiang announced a new cabinet, giving minor portfolios to some people identified by the government as opposition figures.

Since President Obiang has been constrained only by a need to maintain a consensus among his advisers and political supporters in the Democratic Party of Equatorial Guinea, most of whom are drawn from the Nguema family in Mongomo, part of the Esangu subclan of the Fang in the eastern part of Río Muni. Alleged coup attempts in 1981 and 1983 raised little sympathy among the populace.

Under Obiang, schools reopened and primary education expanded, public utilities and roads were restored, a favorable contrast with Macías' tyranny and terror, but his administration has been criticized for not implementing genuine democratic reforms. Corruption and a dysfunctional judicial system disrupt development of Equatorial Guinea's economy and society. In March 2001 the President appointed a new Prime Minister, Cándido Muatetema Rivas, and replaced several ministers perceived to be especially corrupt. However, the government budget still does not include all revenues and expenditures. The United Nations Development Programme has proposed a broad governance reform program, but the Equatorial Guinean Government has not moved very rapidly to implement it.

Although Equatorial Guinea lacks a well-established democratic tradition comparable to the developed democracies of the West, it has progressed toward developing a participatory political system out of the anarchic, chaotic, and repressive conditions of the Macías years. In power since 1979, the Obiang government has made little progress in stimulating the economy. Extremely serious health and sanitary conditions persist, and the educational system remains in desperate condition. Although the abuses and atrocities that characterized the Macías years have been eliminated, effective rule of law does not exist. Religious freedom is tolerated.

On December 15, 2002, Equatorial Guinea's four main opposition parties withdrew from the country's presidential election. Obiang won an election widely considered fraudulent by members of the western press.

According to a March 2004 BBC profile, politics within the country are currently dominated by tensions between Obiang's son Teodoro (known by the nickname Teodorín, meaning Little Teodoro), and other close relatives with powerful positions in the security forces. The tension may be rooted in a power shift arising from the dramatic increase since 1997 in oil production.

A November 2004 report named Mark Thatcher as a financial backer of a March 2004 attempt to topple Obiang organized by Simon Mann. Various accounts also name the UK's MI6, the US Central Intelligence Agency, and Spain as having been tacit supporters of the coup attempt. Nevertheless, an Amnesty International report on the ensuing trial highlights the government's failure to demonstrate in court that the alleged coup attempt had ever actually taken place.

== Executive branch ==
Main office-holders
Office	Name	Party	Since
President	Teodoro Obiang Nguema Mbasogo	Democratic Party of Equatorial Guinea	3 August 1979
Prime Minister	Manuel Osa Nsue Nsua	Democratic Party of Equatorial Guinea	16 August 2024

The 1982 constitution of Equatorial Guinea gives the President extensive powers, including naming and dismissing members of the cabinet, making laws by decree, dissolving the Chamber of Representatives, negotiating and ratifying treaties and calling legislative elections. The President retains his role as commander in chief of the armed forces and minister of defense, and he maintains close supervision of military activity. The Prime Minister is appointed by the President and operates under powers designated by the President. The Prime Minister coordinates government activities in areas other than foreign affairs, national defense and security.

Teodoro Obiang Nguema Mbasogo seized power in a military coup. He is elected by popular vote to a seven-year term.

Another branch of the government is the State Council. The State Council's main function is to serve as caretaker in case of death or physical incapacity of the President. It comprises the following ex-officio members: the President of the Republic, the Prime Minister, the Minister of Defense, the President of the National Assembly and the Chairman of the Social and Economic Council.

== Legislative branch ==
The Chamber of People's Representatives (Cámara de Representantes del Pueblo) has 100 members, elected for a five-year term by proportional representation in multi-member constituencies. Equatorial Guinea is a dominant-party state. This means that only one political party, the Democratic Party of Equatorial Guinea, is in fact allowed to hold effective power. Although minor parties are allowed, they are required to accept the de facto leadership of the ruling party. The Convergence for Social Democracy is the only true opposition party to operate legally in the county, which holds only a single seat in each house of parliament.

== Political parties and elections ==
=== Presidential elections ===
The government announced on 28 April 2016 that Obiang had won the election by an overwhelming margin, as expected. Provisional results showed him with 93.7% of the vote on a turnout of 92.9%. He was sworn in for another term at a ceremony in Malabo on 20 May 2016.

Candidate	Party	Votes	%
Teodoro Obiang Nguema Mbasogo	Democratic Party of Equatorial Guinea	271,177	93.53
Avelino Mocache	Centre-Right Union	4,556	1.57
Buenaventura Monsuy Asumu	Party of the Social Democratic Coalition	4,417	1.52
Benedicto Obian Mangue	Independent	2,802	0.97
Carmelo Mba Bakalé	Popular Action of Equatorial Guinea	2,415	0.83
Agustín Masoko Abegue	Independent	2,412	0.83
Tomás Mba Monabang	Independent	2,154	0.74
Total		289,933	100.00
Valid votes		289,933	96.07
Invalid/blank votes		11,864	3.93
Total votes		301,797	100.00
Registered voters/turnout		325,548	92.70
Source: Government of Equatorial Guinea

=== Parliamentary elections ===
==== Chamber of Deputies ====
Party	Votes	%	Seats	+/–
Democratic Party of Equatorial Guinea			99	0
Citizens for Innovation			1	New
Together We Can			0	–1
Total			100	0
Valid votes	272,022	99.46		
Invalid/blank votes	1,480	0.54		
Total votes	273,502	100.00		
Registered voters/turnout	325,555	84.01		
Source: GEP, GEP

==== Senate ====
Party	Votes	%	Seats	+/–
Democratic Party of Equatorial Guinea			55	+1
Citizens for Innovation			0	New
Together We Can			0	–1
Appointed members			15	0
Total			70	0
Valid votes	272,022	99.46		
Invalid/blank votes	1,480	0.54		
Total votes	273,502	100.00		
Registered voters/turnout	325,555	84.01		
Source: GEP, GEP

== Judicial branch ==
The judicial system follows similar administrative levels. At the top are the President and his judicial advisors (the Supreme Court). In descending rank are the appeals courts, chief judges for the divisions, and local magistrates. Tribal laws and customs are honored in the formal court system when not in conflict with national law. The court system, which often uses customary law, is a combination of traditional, civil, and military justice, and it operates in an ad hoc manner for lack of established procedures and experienced judicial personnel.

As for the legal profession, the Equatorial Guinea Bar Association (Colegio de Abogados de Guinea Ecuatorial) was dissolved by the government in 2002. Although a new bar association was created in 2003, a report issued the same year claimed that " there are few independent lawyers and judges" unless they are "a member of [or sympathetic to] the ruling party." It was reported in 2014 (and later reconfirmed in 2016) that the association does not have an official headquarters.

== Administrative divisions ==
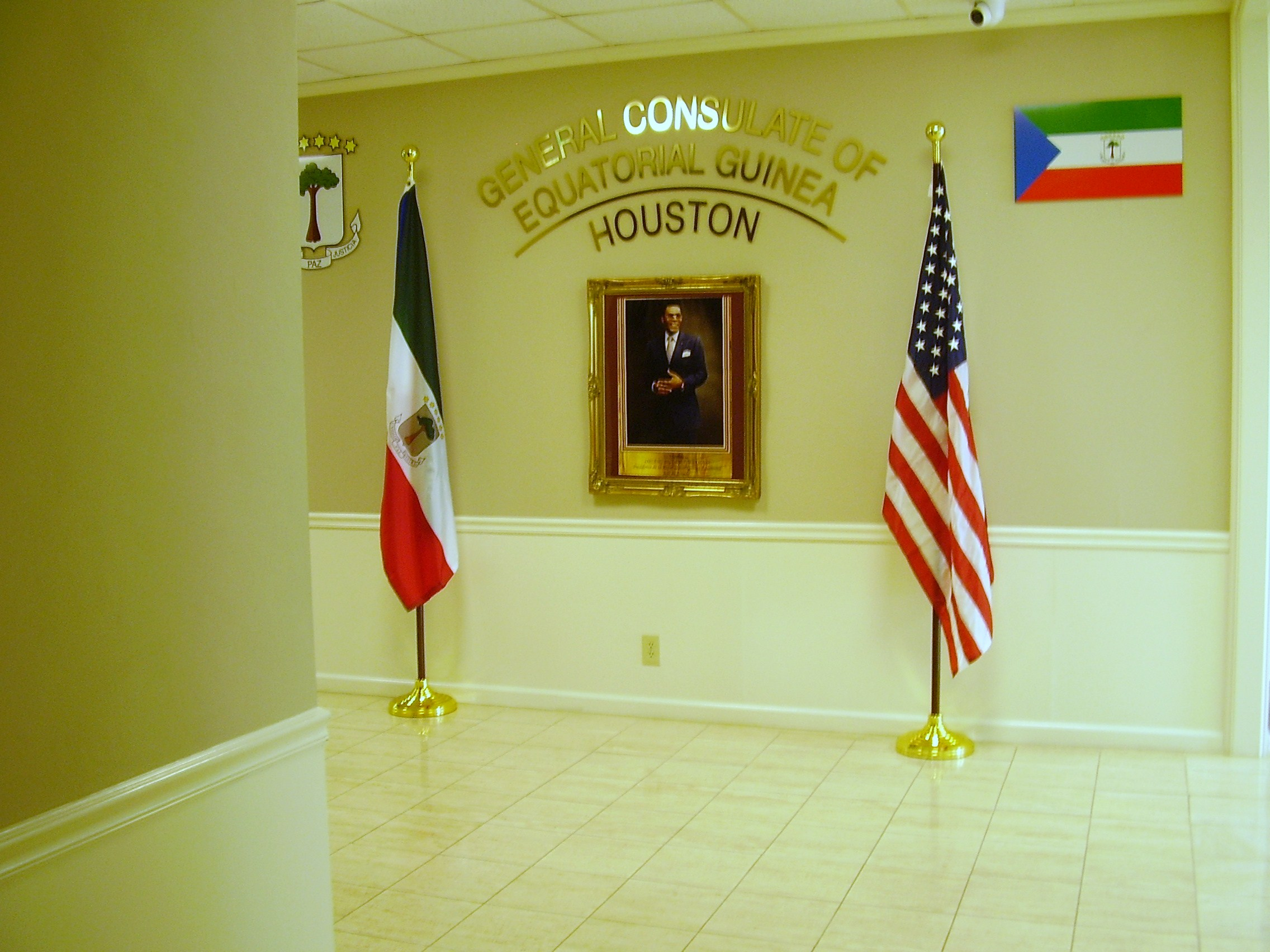
A portrait of President Obiang appears in the entrance to the Consulate-General of Equatorial Guinea in Houston, a diplomatic complex in an office building in Houston, Texas, United States

Equatorial Guinea is divided in seven provinces (provincias); Annobon, Bioko Norte, Bioko Sur, Centro Sur, Kie-Ntem, Litoral, Wele-Nzas.

The President appoints the governors of the seven provinces. Each province is divided administratively into districts and municipalities. The internal administrative system falls under the Ministry of Territorial Administration; several other ministries are represented at the provincial and district levels.

== Membership in international organizations ==
- ACCT, Agency for the French-Speaking Community,
- ACP, African, Caribbean, and Pacific Group of States,
- AfDB, African Development Bank,
- BDEAC, Central African States Development Bank,
- CEEAC, Economic Community of Central African States,
- ECA, Economic Commission for Africa,
- FAO, Food and Agriculture Organization,
- FZ, Franc Zone,
- G-77, Group of 77,
- IBRD, International Bank for Reconstruction and Development,
- ICAO, International Civil Aviation Organization,
- ICRM, International Red Cross and Red Crescent Movement,
- IDA, International Development Association,
- IFAD, International Fund for Agricultural Development,
- IFC, International Finance Corporation,
- IFRCS, International Federation of Red Cross and Red Crescent Societies,
- ILO, International Labour Organization,
- IMF, International Monetary Fund,
- IMO, International Maritime Organization,
- Intelsat, International Telecommunications Satellite Organization,
- Interpol, International Criminal Police Organization,
- IOC, International Olympic Committee,
- ITU, International Telecommunication Union,
- NAM, Non-Aligned Movement,
- OAS; (observer), Organization of American States
- OAU, Organization of African Unity,
- OIF, International Organisation of La Francophonie,
- OPCW, Organisation for the Prohibition of Chemical Weapons,
- OPEC, Organization of the Petroleum Exporting Countries,
- UDEAC, Central African Customs and Economic Union,
- UN, United Nations,
- UNCTAD, United Nations Conference on Trade and Development,
- UNESCO, United Nations Educational, Scientific, and Cultural Organization,
- UNIDO, United Nations Industrial Development Organization,
- UPU, Universal Postal Union,
- WHO, World Health Organization,
- WIPO, World Intellectual Property Organization,
- WToO, World Tourism Organization,
- WTrO;(applicant), World Trade Organization

== Further viewing ==
- Once Upon a Coup, PBS Documentary, August 2009,
