= 2004 Equatorial Guinean parliamentary election =

- 25 April 2004
- All 100 seats in the Chamber of Deputies; 51 seats needed for a majority
- Turnout: 96.45% (▲1.51pp)
Party	Leader	Vote %	Seats	+/–
PDGE	Teodoro Obiang Nguema Mbasogo	49.39	68	−7
OD		42.43	30	New
CPDS	Plácido Micó Abogo	6.03	2	+1
This lists parties that won seats. See the complete results below.
Prime Minister before	Prime Minister after
Cándido Muatetema Rivas; PDGE	Miguel Abia Biteo Boricó; PDGE

Parliamentary elections were held in Equatorial Guinea on 25 April 2004. They were won by the Democratic Party of Equatorial Guinea of President Teodoro Obiang Nguema Mbasogo, which won 68 of the 100 seats in the Chamber of People's Representatives. Its allies, the "Democratic Opposition" bloc, won a further 30 seats.

== Results ==
Party	Votes	%	Seats	+/–
Democratic Party of Equatorial Guinea	99,892	49.39	68	–7
Democratic Opposition (PDGE allies)	85,822	42.43	30	New
Convergence for Social Democracy	12,202	6.03	2	+1
Others	4,353	2.15	0	–
Total	202,269	100.00	100	+20
Valid votes	202,269	99.62		
Invalid/blank votes	773	0.38		
Total votes	203,042	100.00		
Registered voters/turnout	210,514	96.45		
Source: African Elections Database
