= 2008 Equatorial Guinean parliamentary election =

Election in Equatorial Guinea

- 4 May 2008
- All 100 seats in the Chamber of Deputies; 51 seats needed for a majority
Party	Leader	Seats	+/–
PDGE	Teodoro Obiang Nguema Mbasogo	89	+21
OD		10	−20
CPDS	Plácido Micó Abogo	1	−1
This lists parties that won seats. See the complete results below.
Prime Minister before	Prime Minister after
Ricardo Mangue Obama Nfubea; PDGE	Ignacio Milam Tang; PDGE

Early parliamentary elections were held in Equatorial Guinea on 4 May 2008, alongside local elections; 100 seats in parliament and 230 council seats were up for election. According to official results, the ruling Democratic Party of Equatorial Guinea won 89 of the 100 seats in the Chamber of Deputies. Its minor allies, the so-called "Democratic Opposition" bloc, won a further 10 seats. The Convergence for Social Democracy, the main opposition party, won a single seat, down from 2 in 2004.

== Background ==
President Teodoro Obiang Nguema dissolved the Chamber of People's Representatives on 29 February 2008 and announced that the parliamentary elections, originally scheduled for 2009, was being brought forward by one year and would be held together with the local elections on 4 May. This was explained as a way to save money. Prior to the elections, Obiang's Democratic Party of Equatorial Guinea (PDGE) and its allies held 98 of 100 seats in the Chamber of People's Representatives and over 200 of 230 municipal council seats. It was expected that the PDGE would again win overwhelmingly in 2008.

== Campaign ==
Campaigning was reported to have proceeded without popular enthusiasm; about 1,000 people were present for the launch of the PDGE's campaign at a stadium in Malabo, although 15,000 seats were available. During the campaign, an army Antonov An-32 plane crashed off Annobón, killing 13 PDGE militants. There were 278,000 registered voters at the time of the elections.

== Conduct ==
In order to "guarantee a normal functioning of mental faculties" among voters, the sale and consumption of alcohol was banned from the night before the elections through to election day.

On 4 May the Secretary-General of the opposition Convergence for Social Democracy (CPDS), Plácido Micó Abogo, condemned the elections as "a repetition of what the government has always done". He said the elections were marked by "arbitrary procedures in many polling stations", including disappearing ballot papers and the failure to replace ballot papers that had run out; he also alleged that CPDS representatives in polling stations were harassed.

== Results ==
Partial official results were first released on 5 May, showing the PDGE winning overwhelmingly. In some constituencies, such as Moka in southern Bioko, the party was credited with 100% of the vote. Results from most polling stations in Mongomo, from which Obiang originates, showed the PDGE receiving every vote. The best result for the CPDS in these partial results was in Luba district in southern Bioko, where the CPDS was credited with 0.7%. Full results were expected to be announced on 20 May.

On 9 May Clemente Engonga Nguema Onguenes, the President of the National Electoral Commission and Minister of the Interior, announced on the radio that the PDGE and the nine small parties allied to it, which are together known as the Democratic Opposition, had won a total of 99 out of 100 seats; CPDS Secretary-General Plácido Micó Abogo won the remaining seat. The PDGE and the Democratic Opposition also won a combined 213 out of 230 local councillors; the CPDS won 17 councillors on Bioko and in Litoral Province.

Party	Votes	%	Seats	+/–
Democratic Party of Equatorial Guinea			89	+21
Democratic Opposition			10	–20
Convergence for Social Democracy			1	–1
Total			100	0
Registered voters/turnout	278,000	–		
Source: African Elections Database
