= Ministry of Social Affairs and Gender Equality =

Government ministry of Equatorial Guinea

- Ministerio de Asuntos Sociales e Igualdad de Género

Agency overview
- Formed: 1992
- Jurisdiction: Equatorial Guinea
- Minister responsible: Maria Consuelo Nguema Oyana, Minister of Social Affairs and Gender Equality
- Parent agency: Government of Equatorial Guinea

The Ministry of Social Affairs and Gender Equality (Ministerio de Asuntos Sociales e Igualdad de Género, MINASIG) is a government ministry in Equatorial Guinea.

== History ==
A Secretariat of State for the Advancement of Women was created in 1980 as a ministerial office attached to the Ministry of Labor. In 1992 this became a fully-fledged ministry, the Ministry for the Advancement of Women and Social Affairs, later called the Ministry of Social Affairs and the Status of Women (MINASCOM). The ministry received its current name in 2013.

== Ministers ==
| Dates in office | Minister | Ministerial title |
|---|---|---|
| 1994-1996 | Balbina Nchama Nvo | Minister of Social Affairs and Women. |
| 1996-1999 | Margarita Alene Mba | Minister of Social and Women's Affairs (1996–1998); Minister of Social Affaits and Women's Development (1998–1999). |
| 1999-2006 | Teresa Efua Asangono | Minister of Social Affairs and Women's Development (1999–2001); Women's Promotion and Social Affairs (2001–2006). |
| 2006-2012 | Eulalia Nvo Bela | Minister of Social and Women's Affairs. |
| 2012-2013 | Maria Leonor Epan Biribe | Minister of Social and Women's Affairs. |
| 2013-2018 | Mari Carmen Ecoro | Minister of Social Affairs and Gender Equality. |
| 2018- | Maria Consuelo Nguema Oyana | Minister of Social Affairs and Gender Equality. |
