= Vice President of Equatorial Guinea =

Deputy head of state in Equatorial Guinea

Vice President of the Republic of Equatorial Guinea
- Coat of arms of Equatorial Guinea

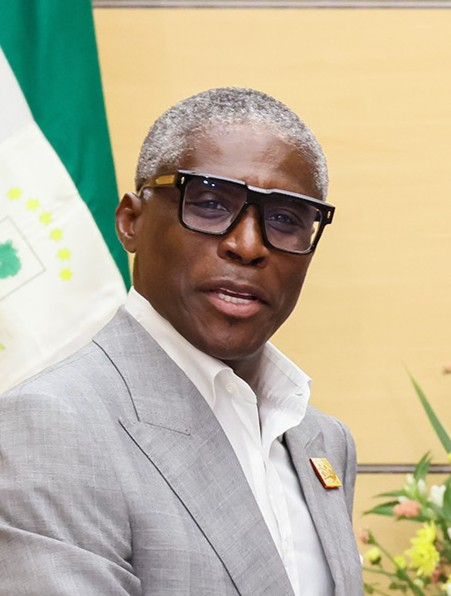
- Incumbent; Teodoro Nguema Obiang Mangue since 21 May 2012
- Member of: Council of Ministers
- Residence: Malabo Government Building
- Appointer: President of Equatorial Guinea
- Constituting instrument: Constitution of Equatorial Guinea (1991)
- Inaugural holder: Edmundo Bossio
- Formation: 12 October 1968; 57 years ago

The vice president of Equatorial Guinea (Spanish: Vicepresidente de Guinea Ecuatorial) is the second highest political position obtainable in Equatorial Guinea. Following the 2011 constitutional reform, there is a provision for two vice presidents who are appointed by the president of Equatorial Guinea.

== List of vice presidents (1968–1982) ==
The position was established in 1968, and abolished in 1982 with the adoption of the new constitution.

=== Vice presidents ===
No.	Portrait	Name (Birth–Death)	Term of office			Political party	President	Ref
No.	Portrait	Name (Birth–Death)	Took office	Left office	Time in office	Political party	President	Ref
1		Edmundo Bossio (1922–1975 (Note: Executed in Black Beach prison on 21 February 1975.))	12 October 1968	2 March 1974	5 years, 141 days	Bubi Union (until 1970)	Francisco Macías Nguema	
		Edmundo Bossio (1922–1975)	12 October 1968	2 March 1974	5 years, 141 days	PUNT	Francisco Macías Nguema	
2		Miguel Eyegue (1933–1979 (Note: Executed by firing squad on 29 September 1979.))	2 March 1974	November 1976	2 years, 244 days	PUNT	Francisco Macías Nguema	
Vacant (November 1976 – May 1978)							Francisco Macías Nguema	
3		Bonifacio Nguema Esono Nchama (1936–2015)	May 1978	3 August 1979 (Deposed in a coup)	1 year, 94 days	PUNT	Francisco Macías Nguema	—

=== First vice presidents ===
No.	Portrait	Name (Birth–Death)	Term of office			Political party	President	Ref
No.	Portrait	Name (Birth–Death)	Took office	Left office	Time in office	Political party	President	Ref
1		Florencio Mayé Elá (born 1944)	3 August 1979	7 December 1981	2 years, 126 days	Military	Teodoro Obiang Nguema Mbasogo	—
2		Cristino Seriche Bioko (1940–2024)	7 December 1981	12 October 1982	309 days	Military	Teodoro Obiang Nguema Mbasogo	—

=== Second vice presidents ===
No.	Portrait	Name (Birth–Death)	Term of office			Political party	President	Ref
No.	Portrait	Name (Birth–Death)	Took office	Left office	Time in office	Political party	President	Ref
1		Salvador Elá Nseng (1940–2022)	3 August 1979	5 February 1980	186 days	Military	Teodoro Obiang Nguema Mbasogo	—
2		Eulogio Oyó (1942–2013)	5 February 1980	7 December 1981	1 year, 305 days	Military	Teodoro Obiang Nguema Mbasogo	—

== List of vice presidents (2012–present) ==
=== First vice presidents ===
No.	Portrait	Name (Birth–Death)	Term of office			Political party	President	Ref
No.	Portrait	Name (Birth–Death)	Took office	Left office	Time in office	Political party	President	Ref
1		Ignacio Milam Tang (born 1940)	21 May 2012	22 June 2016	4 years, 32 days	PDGE	Teodoro Obiang Nguema Mbasogo	
2		Teodoro Nguema Obiang Mangue (born 1969) (Note: Son of President Teodoro Obiang Nguema Mbasogo.)	22 June 2016	Incumbent	10 years, 78 days	PDGE	Teodoro Obiang Nguema Mbasogo	

=== Second vice presidents ===
No.	Portrait	Name (Birth–Death)	Term of office			Political party	President	Ref
No.	Portrait	Name (Birth–Death)	Took office	Left office	Time in office	Political party	President	Ref
1		Teodoro Nguema Obiang Mangue (born 1969)	21 May 2012	22 June 2016	4 years, 32 days	PDGE	Teodoro Obiang Nguema Mbasogo	
Vacant (22 June 2016 – present)

== See also ==
- Politics of Equatorial Guinea
- List of presidents of Equatorial Guinea
- Prime Minister of Equatorial Guinea
- List of colonial governors of Spanish Guinea
