= 2009 Equatorial Guinean presidential election =

- 29 November 2009
- Registered: 292,585
- Turnout: 93.36%
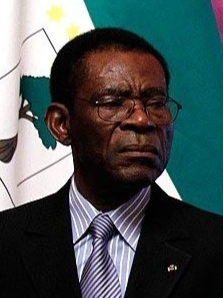

Nominee	Teodoro Obiang Nguema Mbasogo	Plácido Micó Abogo
Party	PDGE	CPDS
Popular vote	260,462	9,700
Percentage	95.76%	3.57%
President before election
Teodoro Obiang Nguema Mbasogo
PDGE
Elected President
Teodoro Obiang Nguema Mbasogo
PDGE

Presidential elections were held in Equatorial Guinea on November 29, 2009. Teodoro Obiang Nguema, who has been President since 1979, ran for another term and won re-election with 95.8% of the vote, according to official results. Opposition leader Plácido Micó Abogo placed second with 3.6%. However, international observers and the main opposition candidate questioned the legitimacy of this election, noting the poor management which created an unfriendly field for other candidates to take part, media manipulation and the unbalanced results.

== Background ==
According to a presidential decree issued on February 29, 2008, the election was planned for 2010. However, it was announced on October 16, 2009, that the election would be held on November 29, 2009. Micó Abogo criticized the election date, arguing that the government intended to deprive the opposition of adequate time to prepare for the election by announcing the date only 45 days in advance. He said that his party, the Convergence for Social Democracy (CPDS), would participate in the election, along with other opposition parties, although he alleged that the ruling Democratic Party of Equatorial Guinea (PDGE) was planning fraud.

== Campaign ==
Campaigning began on November 5. The Equatoguinean Ambassador to the United States, Purificacion Angue Ondo, stressed that the government was "committed to holding fair and democratic elections. As part of our reform efforts we aim to ensure all voices are heard. We view open access of the media to political candidates as crucial in this process. We are committed to ensuring all of our candidates are able to exercise their right to speak to the press." The government pointed to an interview given by Micó Abogo on the Spanish International Channel, which was broadcast on television in Equatorial Guinea, as a sign of its commitment to openness.

Parties running candidates in the election were to receive public funds for campaigning purposes. There were about 291,000 people registered to vote. There is substantial variation in estimates of the total population, with low estimates of around 600,000 people and high estimates of more than one million.

Five candidates stood in the election, although two of them were characterized by the international press as mere proxies for President Obiang. Obiang's campaign presented him as the candidate representing continuity and successful management of Equatorial Guinea's lucrative oil industry, promising redistribution of oil wealth and economic development. Declaring himself to be "the candidate of the people", Obiang said that no one could contradict the will of the people and expressed confidence that he would win more than 97% of the vote (he officially won the previous presidential election, held in 2002, with 97.1%). Meanwhile, Mico Abogo denounced the government as oppressive and said that it won elections only through fraud. He also said that oil wealth had only served to enrich the small elite surrounding Obiang and that it helped to reinforce the regime.

According to a diplomat posted in Malabo, who pointed to Micó Abogo's severe criticisms of the government, the campaign had been marked by an increased "freedom of tone" for the opposition. Noting that the government wanted the election to appear credible, he believed that the increased degree of freedom was the result of negotiations with the government. The active participation of the opposition in the campaign was nevertheless considered limited by Almani Cyllah of the International Foundation for Electoral Systems: "These elections would have been a turning point if the opposition had actually participated. We would have felt that yes, things are moving in the right direction. But the opposition felt that the elections were not going to be free and fair."

Popular Action of Equatorial Guinea candidate Carmelo Mba Bacale announced on 28 November that he had decided to boycott the election. He alleged that the PDGE was planning fraud, saying that PDGE members were heading polling stations as well as the electoral commission.

== Conduct ==
On election day, 29 November, voter turnout was reportedly low. Mico Abogo denounced the conduct of the election, saying that fraud and manipulation were rife, and he declared that he would not accept the official results. Observers noted irregularities in the election. Abogo also claimed that "government agents voted in place of the public and some polling stations closed early."

Abogo's allegation of fraud came amidst international observations that the media had been subjected to manipulations throughout the election, including the refusal of visas for the press and enhanced public relations activity by a private firm supporting President Obiang. Soon after the election, Human Rights Watch said "In recent weeks it [the government] has stifled and harassed the country's beleaguered political opposition ... [and] imposed serious constraints on international observers." With similar observations and accounts in mind, IFES commentator Almani Cyllah said that "it is a little difficult to see how we can say that those elections are free and fair."

== Results ==
Nearly complete provisional results were released by 1 December, showing Obiang winning 95.19% of the vote; Micó Abogo was credited with 4.05%, while Popular Union candidate Archivaldo Montero was credited with 0.39%, Party of the Social Democratic Coalition candidate Bonaventura Monsuy Asumu was credited with 0.19%, and Mba Bacale (who had announced a boycott the day before the election) was credited with 0.17%. 292,585 people were said to have voted, a figure that slightly exceeded the official number of registered voters (about 291,000).

According to official results, Obiang's lead increased slightly when the final results were released on 3 December. According to those results, Obiang received 95.8% of the vote, Micó Abogo received 3.6%, Montero received 0.34%, and Monsuy Asumu received 0.17%. Speaking to a gathering of thousands of supporters in Malabo on 3 December, Obiang declared that the people had chosen "progress and peace" by re-electing him. He vowed "to focus on health and education" as well as more training for women and the youth, while stressing the importance of spending the country's oil wealth responsibly. The official results were inconsistent, with the total of votes received by candidates (271,992) being 28 higher than the published total valid votes (271,964).

Candidate	Party	Votes	%
Teodoro Obiang Nguema Mbasogo	Democratic Party of Equatorial Guinea	260,462	95.76
Plácido Micó Abogo	Convergence for Social Democracy	9,700	3.57
Archivaldo Montero Biribé	Popular Union of Equatorial Guinea	931	0.34
Buenaventura Moswi M'Asumu Nsegue	Party of the Social Democratic Coalition	462	0.17
Carmelo Mba Bacale	Popular Action of Equatorial Guinea	437	0.16
Total		271,992	100.00
Valid votes		271,992	99.57
Invalid/blank votes		1,163	0.43
Total votes		273,155	100.00
Registered voters/turnout		292,585	93.36
Source: African Elections Database

== Aftermath ==
Obiang was sworn in for his new seven-year term in a ceremony at the Palace of Congress in Bata on 8 December 2009; various other African heads of state were in attendance. On the occasion, Obiang spoke of a "bright and promising future". He also said that he would promote cooperation between parties so that there could be a political consensus for the good of the nation.
