= Ministry of Women =

A ministry of women or women's affairs exists in several countries under various names, often headed by a minister for women (or equivalent):

- Ministry of Women's Affairs (Afghanistan) (extinct)
- Ministry of Women, Genders and Diversity (Argentina) (extinct)
- Ministry of Women (Brazil)
- Ministry of Women's Affairs (Cambodia)
- National Women's Service (Chile)
- Minister for Gender Equality (Denmark)
- Ministry of Social Affairs and Gender Equality (Equatorial Guinea)
- Ministry of Women's Rights (France) (extinct)
- Federal Ministry of Family Affairs, Senior Citizens, Women and Youth (Germany)
- Ministry of Women and Children's Affairs (Ghana)
- Ministry on the Status and Rights of Women (Haiti)
- Ministry of Women and Child Development (India)
- Ministry of Women Empowerment and Child Protection (Indonesia)
- Ministry of Women, Youth, Sports and Social Affairs (Kiribati)
- Ministry of Women, Family and Community Development (Malaysia)
- Ministry of Women, Children and Social Welfare (Nepal)
- Ministry for Women (New Zealand)
- Minister of Women's Affairs (Nigeria)
- Ministry of Women and Vulnerable Populations (Peru)
- Ministry of Women Development and Family Affairs (Puntland)
- Ministry of Women and Family (여성가족부) (South Korea)
- Ministry of Women's Affairs (Sri Lanka)
- Ministry of Integration and Gender Equality (Sweden)
- Ministry of Gender, Labour and Social Development (Uganda)
- Ministry of Gender (Zambia)
- Ministry of Women's Affairs, Gender and Community Development (Zimbabwe)
