= 1996 presidential election =

1996 presidential election may refer to:

- 1996 United States presidential election
- 1996 Russian presidential election
- 1996 Armenian presidential election
- 1996 Beninese presidential election
- 1996 Cape Verdean presidential election
- 1996 Chadian presidential election
- 1996 Republic of China presidential election
- 1996 Comorian presidential election
- 1996 Equatorial Guinean presidential election
- 1996 Gambian presidential election
- 1996 Ghanaian presidential election
- 1996 Icelandic presidential election
- 1996 Malagasy presidential election
- 1996 Nigerien presidential election
- 1996 Portuguese presidential election
- 1996 Romanian presidential election
- 1996 São Tomé and Príncipe presidential election
- 1996 Ugandan presidential election
- 1996 Zimbabwean presidential election
