= 1983 Equatorial Guinean parliamentary election =

Parliamentary elections were held in Equatorial Guinea on 28 August 1983, the first since 1973. The new constitution approved in a referendum the previous year provided for a 41-seat Chamber of People's Representatives. President Teodoro Obiang Nguema Mbasogo selected a single candidate for each constituency, which were then approved by voters. No political parties took part in the election, with all candidates standing as independents.

== Results ==
Party	Seats	+/–
Independents	41	New
Total	41	–29
Source: IPU
