= Popular Union of Equatorial Guinea =

Political party in Equatorial Guinea

Popular Union of Equatorial Guinea Unión Popular de Guinea Ecuatorial
- President: Alfredo Mitogo Mitogo Ara
- Founded: 1988
- Legalised: 1992
- Ideology: Christian democracy Conservatism
- Political position: Centre-right
- International affiliation: Centrist Democrat International (Observer)

Website
- elsolnacientege.bligoo.es

The Popular Union of Equatorial Guinea (Spanish: Unión Popular de Guinea Ecuatorial) is a political party in the Equatorial Guinea. It is led by Daniel Martinez Ayecaba. The party was originally banned by the ruling Democratic Party of Equatorial Guinea, the ruling party since 1987, but was legalized in May 1992.

The UP's candidate, Archivaldo Montelo Biribé gained 0.34% of the country's vote in the 2009 Equatoguinean presidential election. The party did not participate in the 2016 election.

== Electoral history ==
=== Presidential elections ===
Election	Party candidate	Votes	%	Result
1996	Andres Moses Mbada	1,135	0.62%	Lost ✗
2002	Jeremías Ondo Ngomo	663	0.31%	Lost ✗
2009	Archivaldo Montero Biribé	931	0.34%	Lost ✗
2016	Did not participate.			
