= Sendje Hydroelectric Power Station =

Power station in Equatorial Guinea

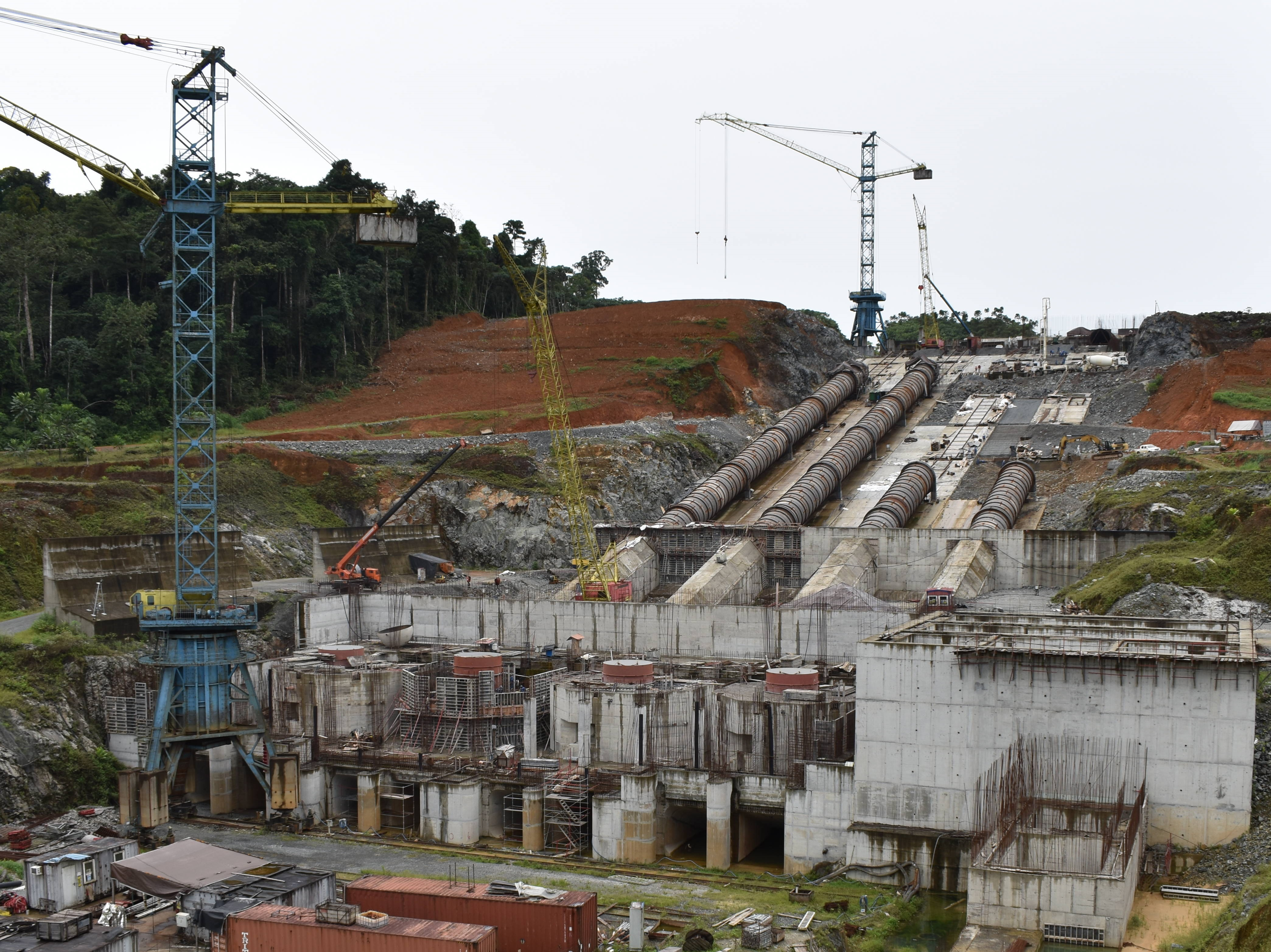

- Map of Equatorial Guinea showing the location of Sendje. Sendje Hydroelectric Power Station (Africa) Sendje Hydroelectric Power Station (Earth)
- Country: Equatorial Guinea
- Location: Sendje, Mainland
- Coordinates: 01°38′52″N 09°49′32″E
- Purpose: Power
- Status: Under construction
- Construction began: 2012
- Construction cost: €467 million
- Owner: Government of Equatorial Guinea

Dam and spillways
- Impounds: Weller River

Power Station
- Turbines: 4 x 50 MW
- Installed capacity: 200 megawatts (270,000 hp)
- Annual generation: 1,042 GWh

Sendje Hydroelectric Power Station is a 200 megawatts (270,000 hp) hydroelectric power station under construction in Equatorial Guinea. The power station is under development by the Government of Equatorial Guinea, with funds borrowed from the Development Bank of Central African States (BDEAC). The engineering, procurement and construction (EPC) contractor for this project is Duglas Alliance, a Ukrainian multinational engineering and construction company.

== Location ==
The power station is located at the village of Sendje (Senye), across the Weller River, approximately 40 kilometres (25 mi) southeast of the city of Bata, on the country's mainland.

== Overview ==
The power station is designed with maximum generation capacity of 200 megawatts, derived from four Alstom turbines, each rated at 50 megawatts. When fully operational, the power station's energy will be distributed to the main urban centers on the mainland, including Bata, Mbini, Kogo, Añisok, Mongomo and Ebebiyin. This power station together with the 120 megawatts Djibloho Hydroelectric Power Station, form the "backbone" of the country's hydroelectric energy capacity.

== Construction costs and funding ==
The construction budget is reported to be €467 million (US$531 million). The cost was met by the government of Equatorial Guinea, with partial funding in form of a loan of €122 million (US$137 million), provided by BDEAC. Construction began in 2012 and was expected to conclude in 2020.

== Benefits ==
When fully operational, this power station will increase national generational capacity to 590 megawatts. It will add 1,042 GWh to the national electric output, in form of "clean renewable energy", increasing access to grid-power, reducing the cost of electricity in the country and promoting national economic growth.

== See also ==
- List of power stations in Equatorial Guinea
