= Gaudencio Mohaba Mesú =

Equatoguinean politician

President of Chamber of Deputies of Equatorial Guinea
- In office 12 July 2013 – 29 August 2024
- Preceded by: Ángel Serafín Seriche Dougan
- Succeeded by: Salomón Nguema Owono

Personal details
- Born: 26 December 1970 (age 55)
- Party: PDGE
- Occupation: Politician

Gaudencio Mohaba Mesú (born 26 Dec 1970) is an Equatoguinean politician. He has served as the President of the Chamber of Deputies in Equatorial Guinea since July 2013. In August 2024, he was appointed as deputy prime minister.
