= Jerónimo Osa Osa Ecoro =

Equatorial Guinean politician

Secretary General of the Democratic Party of Equatorial Guinea
- Incumbent
- Assumed office October 2013
- President: Teodoro Obiang Nguema Mbasogo
- Preceding: Lucas Nguema Esono

Member of the Chamber of Deputies of Equatorial Guinea
- Incumbent
- Assumed office 2013

Personal details
- Born: November 1963 (age 62) Anisoc, Equatorial Guinea
- Party: Democratic Party of Equatorial Guinea
- Occupation: Secretary General of PDGE Minister of Information (2009–2012)

Jerónimo Osa Osa Ecoro is an Equatorial Guinean politician and economist.

== Life ==
He was born on November 1963 in the town of Añisoc. He is currently working as a secretary general of the Democratic Party of Equatorial Guinea (PDGE).

In 2004, he was appointed as a deputy minister of infrastructure and urban planning. In August 2006, he was appointed as a deputy minister of labour and social security; in May 2009, he was as an appointed minister of information, culture, tourism and as government spokesperson. He held these positions until he resigned in May 2012.

Since 2013, he has served as a member of the Chamber of Deputies, being the spokesperson for the PDGE parliamentary group.

In October 2013, he was appointed as a Secretary General of the PDGE, replacing Lucas Nguema Esono.
