= Parliament of Equatorial Guinea =

National legislative body of Equatorial Guinea

Parliament of Equatorial Guinea Parlamento de Guinea Ecuatorial Parlement de Guinée équatoriale Parlamento da Guiné Equatorial

Type
- Type: Bicameral
- Houses: Senate (upper house) Chamber of Deputies (lower house)

History
- Founded: 2012

Leadership
- President of Senate: Teresa Efua Asangono, Democratic Party of Equatorial Guinea since 12 July 2013
- President of Chamber of Deputies: Salomón Nguema Owono, Democratic Party of Equatorial Guinea since 29 August 2024
- Deputy Presidents: Ernesto Obiang Nchama Ekong; Javier Mbong Oyono Nguema; Alejandro Yengue Mba Esono; Rosario Efa Nze Mbou since 12 July 2023

Structure
- Seats: 155: Senate: 55; Chamber of Deputies: 100
- Senate political groups: Government (55): Democratic Party of Equatorial Guinea (55)
- Chamber of Deputies political groups: Government (100): Democratic Party of Equatorial Guinea (100)

Elections
- Senate voting system: Party-list proportional representation
- Chamber of Deputies voting system: Party-list proportional representation
- Last Senate election: 20 November 2022
- Last Chamber of Deputies election: 20 November 2022

Meeting place
- Malabo

The Parliament is the national legislature of Equatorial Guinea. The bicameral parliament consists of a Senate and the Chamber of Deputies.

== Latest elections ==
=== Senate ===
Party	Votes	%	Seats	+/–
Democratic Party of Equatorial Guinea			55	0
Convergence for Social Democracy			0	New
Party of the Social Democratic Coalition			0	New
Total			55	0
Registered voters/turnout	427,671	–		
Source: Government of Equatorial Guinea

=== Chamber of Deputies ===
The PDGE won all seats in parliament and in all municipal assemblies according to official results as well.

Party	Votes	%	Seats	+/–
Democratic Party of Equatorial Guinea			100	+1
Convergence for Social Democracy			0	New
Party of the Social Democratic Coalition			0	New
Total			100	0
Registered voters/turnout	427,671	–		
Source: Government of Equatorial Guinea
