= Angue =

Angue or Angüe is a Fang feminine name. Notable people with the name include:

- María Nsué Angüe (1945–2017), Equatoguinean writer and Minister of Education
- Gerardo Angüe Mangue, Equatoguinean political activist
- Purificación Angue Ondo Equatoguinean, diplomat

== See also ==
Angüés
