= Minister for women =

Minister for women or minister of women is a ministerial position in several countries and country subdivisions, including:

- Minister for Women (Australia)
  - Minister for Women (New South Wales)
  - Minister for Women (South Australia), see Second Malinauskas ministry
  - Minister for Women (Victoria)
  - Minister for Women's Interests, Western Australia
- Minister for Women and Gender Equality, Canada
- Minister for Women (New Zealand)
- Minister of Women, Children and Senior Citizens (Nepal)
- Minister for Women and Equalities (United Kingdom)

== See also ==
- Ministry of Women (disambiguation)
- Minister for Gender Equality (Denmark)
- Minister for Gender Equality (Sweden)
