= Miguel Abia Biteo Boricó =

Equatoguinean politician (1961–2012)

Miguel Abia Biteo

Prime Minister of Equatorial Guinea
- In office 11 July 2004 – 14 August 2006
- Preceded by: Cándido Muatetema Rivas
- Succeeded by: Ricardo Mangue Obama Nfubea

Personal details
- Born: Miguel Abia Biteo Boricó; 11 January 1961 Baney, Spanish Guinea
- Died: 6 December 2012 (aged 51) Malabo, Equatorial Guinea
- Cause of death: Myocardial infarction
- Citizenship: Equatorial Guinean
- Party: Democratic Party of Equatorial Guinea
- Occupation: Politician

Miguel Abia Biteo Boricó (11 January 1961 – 6 December 2012) was an Equatoguinean politician who served as the 5th Prime Minister of Equatorial Guinea having served from 11 July 2004 to 14 August 2006. He was a member of the Bubi ethnic group.

Abia Biteo was born in 1961 in Santiago de Bane, which is part of the island of Bioko Norte, in then Spanish Guinea. He was a part of the Bubi ethnic group, becoming one of the first Bubi politicians as they have previously not had an active role in politics. Abia Biteo lived and studied in the Soviet Union, where he became a mining engineer. After returning to Equatorial Guinea he began to work for the government and became one of the most powerful officials in his country's oil industry, becoming one of the signatories of the first oil agreements between Equatorial Guinea and American companies and help shaped the country's oil policy. During the 1990s he held the position of Director at the Ministry of Mines and Hydrocarbons and was also Secretary of State in that ministry.

He was Minister of Finance from 1999 until 2000, when he was forced to resign following a corruption scandal.

Abia Biteo served as Minister of State in charge of Relations with Parliament and Legal Affairs of the Presidency prior to being appointed Prime Minister on 11 July 2004; his government was announced on 14 July. He married Isabel Erauel Ivina, the daughter of the Mayor of Malabo, in 2005.

President Obiang directed serious criticism at Abia Biteo during 2006, and his government resigned on 10 August 2006. Ricardo Mangue Obama Nfubea was appointed to succeed him on 14 August.

Abia Biteo remained tortured in Black Beach prison in Malabo as of 2007 and died on 6 December 2012 apparently due to a cardiac arrest.

Preceded by Cándido Muatetema Rivas	Prime Minister of Equatorial Guinea; 2004–2006	Succeeded by Ricardo Mangue Obama Nfubea
