= Cándido Muatetema Rivas =

Prime Minister of Equatorial Guinea (1960–2014)

Ambassador of Equatorial Guinea to Germany
- In office 2005–2014

Prime Minister of Equatorial Guinea
- In office 27 February 2001 – 11 July 2004
- President: Teodoro Obiang Nguema
- Preceded by: Ángel Serafín Seriche Dougan
- Succeeded by: Miguel Abia Biteo Boricó

Second Secretary of the Chamber of People's Representatives
- In office June 1996 – February 2001

Secretary of State for Youth and Sports
- In office December 1993 – January 1996

General Treasurer of the State
- In office November 1991 – August 1993

Personal details
- Born: 20 February 1960 Batete, Fernando Po, Equatorial Guinea
- Died: 16 June 2014 (aged 54) Berlin, Germany

Cándido Muatetema Rivas (20 February 1960 – 16 June 2014) was an Equatoguinean politician who served as Prime Minister from 2001 to 2004.

== Biography ==
Muatetema was born in Batete, a village in southern Fernando Po (today Bioko) near Luba. His maternal side, the Rivas, was of Cuban descent.

Muatetema was General Treasurer of the State from November 1991 to August 1993 and served in the government as Secretary of State for Youth and Sports from December 1993 to January 1996. He was also a co-founder of the youth section of the Democratic Party of Equatorial Guinea (PDGE) and was the youth section's General Coordinator from 1993 to 1995. He later became Deputy Secretary-General of the PDGE.

From June 1996 to February 2001, Muatetema was Second Secretary of the Chamber of People's Representatives. He was also a member of CEMAC's Inter-Parliamentary Commission and Vice-President of its Economic Affairs Sub-Commission from April 2000 to February 2001.

Muatetema was appointed prime minister by President Teodoro Obiang Nguema on 26 February 2001, succeeding Ángel Serafín Seriche Dougan. His government was sworn in on 27 February and President Obiang emphasized on this occasion that it needed to show unity and "cohesion".

Muatetema and his government resigned on 11 July 2004, and Obiang appointed Miguel Abia Biteo Boricó to succeed him on 14 July. The structure of his government was a cabinet with 50 ministerial posts.

He was appointed Equatorial Guinea's Ambassador to Germany in 2005, a posting he held until his death in 2014.

Cándido Muatetema Rivas died in Berlin, Germany, on 16 June 2014, at the age of 54.

Preceded by Ángel Serafín Seriche Dougan	Prime Minister of Equatorial Guinea; 2001–2004	Succeeded by Miguel Abia Biteo Boricó
