= Senate (Equatorial Guinea) =

Upper house of Equatorial Guinea

Senate Senado Sénat

Type
- Type: Upper house

History
- Founded: 2012

Leadership
- President: Teresa Efua Asangono, Democratic Party of Equatorial Guinea since 12 July 2013

Structure
- Seats: 55
- Political groups: Government (55): Democratic Party of Equatorial Guinea (55)

Elections
- Voting system: Party-list proportional representation
- Last election: 20 November 2022

Meeting place
- Malabo

Website
- Official Website of the Senate

The Senate is the upper house of the Parliament of Equatorial Guinea.

== Latest election ==
| Party | Votes | % | Seats | +/– |
|---|---|---|---|---|
| Democratic Party of Equatorial Guinea | | | 55 | 0 |
| Convergence for Social Democracy | | | 0 | New |
| Party of the Social Democratic Coalition | | | 0 | New |
| Total | | | 55 | 0 |
| Registered voters/turnout | 427,671 | – | | |
Source: Government of Equatorial Guinea

== History ==
The Senate was established following constitutional reforms approved in a referendum in 2011 and enacted in February 2012. The first elections were held in May 2013.

== Presidents of the Senate ==
| Name | Took office | Left office | Notes |
|---|---|---|---|
| Teresa Efua Asangono | 12 July 2013 | Incumbent | |

== Membership ==
The Senate has 70 members, of which 55 are elected and 15 are appointed by the President.
