= Salomón Nguema Owono =

Equatoguinean politician

3rd President of Chamber of Deputies of Equatorial Guinea
- Incumbent
- Assumed office 29 August 2024
- Preceded by: Gaudencio Mohaba Mesú
- In office 1999 – 18 June 2008
- Preceded by: Marcelino Nguema Onguene
- Succeeded by: Ángel Serafín Seriche Dougan

Personal details
- Born: 12 December 1954 (age 71)
- Party: PDGE

Salomón Nguema Owono (born 12 December 1954) is an Equatoguinean politician who has been the 3rd President of the Chamber of Deputies since 2024, and previously held the position from 1999 to 2008. He and Gaudencio Mohaba Mesú are tied for having the longest tenures as president of the chamber. Between his terms as president he was Minister of Health and Social Welfare, during which he oversaw Equatorial Guinea's response to the COVID-19 pandemic.

== Early life ==
Salomón Nguema Owono was born on 12 December 1954.

== Career ==
In 1999, Owono was selected to succeed Marcelino Nguema Onguene as President of the Chamber of Deputies. He was the third person to hold the position and held it until 2008. In 2006, Owono conducted a three day state visit to Angola.

Owono was Vice Prime Minister in charge of Social Affairs and Human Rights of Equatorial Guinea and then Minister of Health and Social Welfare. He oversaw the response to the COVID-19 pandemic in Equatorial Guinea. A nurse was arrested for criticising Sampaka Hospital for having no oxygen for COVID-19 patients and Owono threatened legal action against her.

Santiago Nsobeya, the First Vice President of the chamber, died on 14 August 2020, and Owono was selected to replace him. On 29 August 2024, Owono was elected President of the chamber to succeed Gaudencio Mohaba Mesú, who was appointed Deputy Prime Minister. He is tied with Mesú for longest serving president of the chamber. María Pelagia Abeso Tomo, who was Second Vice President, was selected to succeed Owono as First Vice President.

== Works cited ==
=== News ===
- "Angola: Equatorial Guinea Parliament Speaker in Luanda". allAfrica. 7 March 2006. Archived from the original on 2 July 2025.
- "Coronavirus: une infirmière équato-guinéenne emprisonnée pour avoir critiqué un hôpital". Voice of America. 17 April 2020. Archived from the original on 2 July 2025.
- Bichua, Alisol (29 August 2024). "Salomón Nguema Owono, elegido nuevo Presidente de la Cámara de los Diputados". Ahoraeg. Archived from the original on 2 July 2025.
- Nchama, Catalina (29 August 2024). "Salomón Nguema Owono, más de dos décadas después vuelve a ser elegido presidente de la Cámara de Diputados de Guinea Ecuatorial". Revista Real Equatorial Guinea. Archived from the original on 2 July 2025.

=== Web ===
- "Equatorial Guinea". Inter-Parliamentary Union. Archived from the original on 2 July 2025.
- "Human Rights Council starts third day of its High-Level Segment and hears statements from 17 dignitaries". Office of the United Nations High Commissioner for Human Rights. 29 February 2012. Archived from the original on 2 July 2025.
- "Salomón Nguema Owono, appointed First Vice President of the Chamber of Deputies". Equatorial Guinea. 15 August 2020. Archived from the original on 2 July 2025.
- "Salomón Nguema Owono, new President of the Chamber of Deputies". Equatorial Guinea. 30 August 2024. Archived from the original on 2 July 2025.
