= Silvestre Siale Bileka =

Equatoguinean politician (born 1940)

Silvestre Siale

Prime Minister of Equatorial Guinea
- In office 4 March 1992 – 1 April 1996
- President: Teodoro Obiang
- Preceded by: Cristino Seriche

Personal details
- Born: Silvestre Siale Bileka; 8 March 1940 (age 85)
- Political party: Democratic Party of Equatorial Guinea

Silvestre Siale Bileka (born 8 March 1940) is an Equatoguinean politician. Bileka served as Prime Minister from 4 March 1992 to 1 April 1996. He is a member of the Partido Democrático de Guinea Ecuatorial (Democratic Party of Equatorial Guinea). Bileka also served as President of the Supreme Court, tendering his resignation to President Teodoro Obiang in January 2004. The official reason for his resignation was "not being able to reach the desired result in terms of improvement of the operation of the judiciary". He was the first senior state official to resign, as the President usually instead simply dismissed his colleagues. He is a Bubi.

Preceded by Cristino Seriche Bioko	Prime Minister of Equatorial Guinea; 1992–1996	Succeeded by Ángel Serafín Seriche Dougan
