= Mari Carmen Ecoro =

Equatoguinean politician

Ministry of Social Affairs and Gender Equality
- In office 2013—2018

Personal details
- Born: Equatorial Guinea
- Children: 2
- Education: LaGuardia Community College; Queens College; Columbia University
- Occupation: Politician

María del Carmen Ecoro is an Equatoguinean politician and former Minister of Social Affairs and Gender Equality.

== Biography ==
Mari Carmen Ecoro was born in Equatorial Guinea. She married young, and her first child was born two weeks before her 16th birthday. In 1984 she and her first husband, an accountant with the United Nations, to the United States. After a second child, the pair divorced. She stayed in the United States, bringing up her two daughters in Queens, New York City. At the age of 34 she restarted study, obtaining her GED through the public television station WNET. She went on to study mental health at LaGuardia Community College and then majored in psychology at Queens College.

In 2006 she was appointed a presidential adviser on education in Equatorial Guinea. In 2010-11 she returned to study in the United States, gaining a M.Sc. in negotiation and conflict resolution from Columbia University School of Continuing Education. Her master's thesis was titled "The Impact of Colonialism on the Education and on Cultural Identity Development of the African-Spanish."

In 2013 Mari Carmen Ecoro was appointed Minister of Social Affairs and Gender Equality. During her tenure, she worked on interventions to promote gender equality and reduce gender based violence. Some of those interventions included increasing awareness among the populace and stipulation of legal mechanisms to arrest violence against women in particular.

Along with the Mayor of Malabo, Maria Coloma Edjang Bengono, as among the two top senior female politicians in Equatorial Guinea in 2014, Ecoro left indications during an interview that women in her country were present at all senior government levels. This was in response to criticisms from the United Nations that women were lacking in leadership positions in most countries. She added that while "there are still things to improve", President Obiang Nguema Mbasogo's personal commitment to gender equality in Equatorial Guinea should be a model for others to emulate.

In 2018 Ecoro was replaced as Minister of Social Affairs and Gender Equality by María Consuelo Nguema Oyana.
