= Colegio Español Don Bosco =

Spanish international school in Equatorial Guinea

Coordinates: 3.750°N 8.7376°E

- Colegio Español Don Bosco
- Barrio Elá-Nguema, Malabo, Equatorial Guinea

Information
- Grades: Educación Infantil through Bachillerato

Colegio Español Don Bosco is a private Spanish international school in Barrio Elá-Nguema, Malabo, Equatorial Guinea. It serves levels Educación Infantil through Bachillerato (senior high school/sixth form college).

== See also ==
- Education in Equatorial Guinea
- List of international schools
