= 1989 Equatorial Guinean presidential election =

← 1968	25 June 1989	1996 →
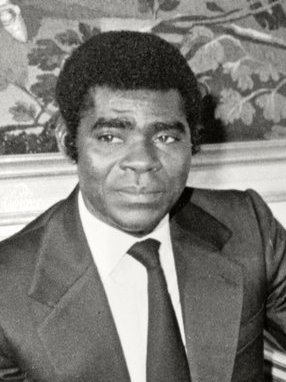
Nominee	Teodoro Obiang Nguema Mbasogo
Party	PDGE
Percentage	99%
President before election
Teodoro Obiang Nguema Mbasogo
PDGE
Elected President
Teodoro Obiang Nguema Mbasogo
PDGE

Presidential elections were held in Equatorial Guinea on 25 June 1989, the first since 1968, although incumbent Teodoro Obiang Nguema Mbasogo had his seven-year term starting in 1982 approved in a referendum in 1982. He was the only candidate and was re-elected unopposed with 99% of the vote.
