= Ángel Serafín Seriche Dougan =

Equatorial Guinea politician

President of Chamber of Deputies of Equatorial Guinea
- In office 18 June 2008 – 12 July 2013
- Preceded by: Salomón Nguema Owono
- Succeeded by: Gaudencio Mohaba Mesu

Personal details
- Born: 1946 (age 79–80)

Ángel Serafín Seriche Dougan (born 1946) was an Equatoguinean politician who served as Prime Minister of Equatorial Guinea from 1 April 1996 to 4 March 2001.

Beginning in 2000, Dougan's government was subjected to serious criticism from the parliamentary majority with regard to allegations of corruption. This led to what was described as an "institutional crisis", and Dougan resigned on 23 February 2001. President Teodoro Obiang Nguema appointed Cándido Muatetema Rivas to succeed him on 26 February.

Preceded by Silvestre Siale Bileka	Prime Minister of Equatorial Guinea; 1996–2001	Succeeded by Cándido Muatetema Rivas
