= 2017 Equatorial Guinean parliamentary election =

Parliamentary elections were held in Equatorial Guinea on 12 November 2017. The ruling Democratic Party of Equatorial Guinea won all but one of the seats in the Chamber of Deputies, every seat in the Senate and control of every local council.

== Electoral system ==
The 100 members of the Chamber of Deputies are elected by closed-list proportional representation from multi-member constituencies based on the 19 electoral districts with an electoral threshold of 10%. Of the 70 members of the Senate, 55 are elected from the same 19 electoral districts also by closed-list proportional representation and with an electoral threshold of 10%. An additional 15 members are appointed.

== Results ==
=== Chamber of Deputies ===
Party	Votes	%	Seats	+/–
Democratic Party of Equatorial Guinea			99	0
Citizens for Innovation			1	New
Together We Can			0	–1
Total			100	0
Valid votes	272,022	99.46		
Invalid/blank votes	1,480	0.54		
Total votes	273,502	100.00		
Registered voters/turnout	325,555	84.01		
Source: GEP, GEP

=== Senate ===
Party	Votes	%	Seats	+/–
Democratic Party of Equatorial Guinea			55	+1
Citizens for Innovation			0	New
Together We Can			0	–1
Appointed members			15	0
Total			70	0
Valid votes	272,022	99.46		
Invalid/blank votes	1,480	0.54		
Total votes	273,502	100.00		
Registered voters/turnout	325,555	84.01		
Source: GEP, GEP
