= Teresa Efua Asangono =

Equatoguinean politician

President of the Senate
- Incumbent
- Assumed office 12 July 2013

Personal details
- Born: 1957 (age 68–69)
- Party: PDGE
- Occupation: Politician

Teresa Efua Asangono (born 1957) is an Equatoguinean politician. She is the current Senate President of the Parliament of the Republic of Equatorial Guinea. Efua is the first female Senate President in the Republic of Equatorial Guinea. She was first elected on 12 July 2013 for her first tenure and subsequently re-elected on 12 January 2018.
