= 1988 Equatorial Guinean parliamentary election =

Parliamentary elections were held in Equatorial Guinea on 3 and 10 July 1988. The Democratic Party of Equatorial Guinea (PDGE), established the previous year, was the sole legal party at the time, as an attempt at legalising the opposition Progress Party of Equatorial Guinea in June had failed. The PDGE presented a single list of 60 candidates for the 60 seats, which was reportedly approved by 99.2% of voters.

== Results ==
Party	Seats	+/–
Democratic Party of Equatorial Guinea	60	New
Total	60	+29
Source: Inter-Parliamentary Union
