= 2011 Equatorial Guinean constitutional referendum =

- 13 November 2011

Results
Choice	Votes	%
Yes	295,780	97.73%
No	6,858	2.27%
Valid votes	302,638	99.31%
Invalid or blank votes	2,092	0.69%
Total votes	304,730	100.00%
Registered voters/turnout	331,982	91.79%

A constitutional referendum was held in Equatorial Guinea on 13 November 2011. It allowed the incumbent President Teodoro Obiang Nguema Mbasogo (ruling since 1979) to run for at least two more seven-year terms as well as establish the post of Vice-President, widely expected to be given to his son Teodoro Nguema Obiang Mangue in preparation of dynastic succession.

== Background ==
The constitutional changes included imposing term limits on the presidency, allowing two seven-year terms. They also abolished age restrictions, allowing the then 69-year old President Obiang to run when he turned 75. The changes were hailed by the government as a democratic advance, with the addition of term limits highlighted by state media. They would also allow the president to create the post of Vice President, suspected to be given to Obiang's son, Teodoro Obiang Nguema Mbasogo, then under investigation in the United States and France for money laundering.

== Conduct ==
Many denounced the referendum as fake, with many widespread cases of voter fraud and intimidation of groups trying to monitor the votes. They also pointed to the fact that votes were counted by those close to the government. Opposition leader Plácido Micó Abogo claimed that the proposal was not even seen the official text of the constitutional changes. He removed poll watchers after threats of violence, including one of a young supporter who alleged he "was threatened with being tortured by a colonel." Despite these reports, the government claimed the vote had passed peacefully. There was also concern that the provision on term limits would not apply retrospectively, allowing Obiang to run again in 2016, which he did.

== Results ==
Choice	Votes	%
For	295,780	97.73
Against	6,858	2.27
Total	302,638	100.00
Valid votes	302,638	99.31
Invalid/blank votes	2,092	0.69
Total votes	304,730	100.00
Registered voters/turnout	331,982	91.79
Source: African Elections Database
