= 1996 Equatorial Guinean presidential election =

← 1989	25 February 1996	2002 →
- Registered: 230,238
- Turnout: 79.81%
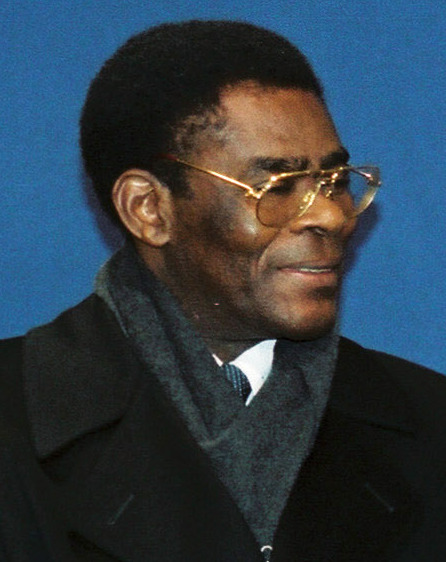

Nominee	Teodoro Obiang Nguema Mbasogo	Secundino Oyono Edú-Aguong Ada
Party	PDGE	CSDP
Popular vote	179,592	1,349
Percentage	97.85%	0.73%
President before election
Teodoro Obiang Nguema Mbasogo
PDGE
Elected President
Teodoro Obiang Nguema Mbasogo
PDGE

Presidential elections were held in Equatorial Guinea on 25 February 1996. Although the country was no longer a one-party state, the elections were boycotted by the opposition, although their names remained on the ballot papers. As a result, the incumbent Teodoro Obiang Nguema Mbasogo won with 98% of the vote. Turnout was 80%.

Election monitors found numerous cases of irregularities in the conduct of the election. There was widespread fraud in the elections.

The main opposition candidate, Celestino Bacale, withdrew his candidacy amid threats of violence.

== Results ==
Candidate	Party	Votes	%
Teodoro Obiang Nguema Mbasogo	Democratic Party of Equatorial Guinea	179,592	97.85
Secundino Oyono Edú-Aguong Ada	Social Democratic and Popular Convergence	1,349	0.73
Andres Moses Mbada	Popular Union of Equatorial Guinea	1,135	0.62
Severo Moto Nsá	Progress Party of Equatorial Guinea	1,017	0.55
Buenaventura Monsue Asumu	Party of the Social Democratic Coalition	451	0.25
Total		183,544	100.00
Valid votes		183,544	99.88
Invalid/blank votes		218	0.12
Total votes		183,762	100.00
Registered voters/turnout		230,238	79.81
Source: Nohlen et al.

The official results had a total of 183,830 voters.
