= Plácido Micó Abogo =

Equatoguinean politician (born 1963)

Plácido Micó

Secretary-General of the Convergence for Social Democracy
- In office 1994-2013

Member of the Chamber of People's Representatives
- In office 1999-2009

Personal details
- Born: Plácido Micó Abogo; 11 July 1963 (age 62) Mbini, Spanish Guinea
- Party: Convergence for Social Democracy

Plácido Micó Abogo (born 11 July 1963) is an Equatoguinean politician. He was Secretary-General of the Convergence for Social Democracy (CPDS), an opposition political party in Equatorial Guinea, from 1994 to 2013.

== Biography ==
Micó Abogo was a founding member of the CPDS and was Secretary of Administration and Finance of the CPDS Provisional Executive Committee during the early 1990s. He was arrested after copies of the CPDS paper La Verdad, which he and Celestino Bonifacio Bacalé wanted sent to Spain, were intercepted at the airport in Malabo in February 1992. He was jailed for about four months and was allegedly tortured.

In December 1994, at the Constitutive Congress of the CPDS, held in Bata, Plácido Micó Abogo was chosen as secretary-general. He was re-elected to that post at the party's Second National Congress in February 2001 and at its Third National Congress (28–30 January 2005).

Plácido Micó Abogo was the only CPDS candidate to win a seat in the Chamber of People's Representatives in the 1999 parliamentary election. He was arrested in May 2002, placed under house arrest, and charged in connection with a 1997 coup plot. In June 2002, he was sentenced to 14 years and eight months in prison; however, President Teodoro Obiang Nguema Mbasogo pardoned him in August 2003.

In the April 2004 parliamentary election, Micó Abogo was re-elected to the Chamber of People's Representatives as a CPDS candidate in Malabo; he was one of two CPDS candidates to win seats. He was again re-elected in the May 2008 parliamentary election, but was left as the only representative of the opposition in the 100-seat Chamber of People's Representatives.

In an interview with the Spanish newspaper El Pais, published on 11 July 2008, he was strongly critical of the political situation in Equatorial Guinea, saying that "the opposition has no political presence. There are no unions or professional associations. There is no media that escapes the government's control", and he condemned the parliamentary election held in May as severely "violent and manipulated". He accused the United States of being complicit in the rule of President Obiang for the sake of its oil interests.

On 16 October 2009, it was announced that the next presidential election would be held on 29 November 2009, earlier than expected. Micó Abogo promptly denounced the move, arguing that "with such little time, it will be impossible to properly organise a political campaign in a country that lacks everything". Despite his criticism, he stood as a candidate in the election.
