= 2002 Equatorial Guinean presidential election =

- 15 December 2002
- Registered: 215,447
- Turnout: 97.98%
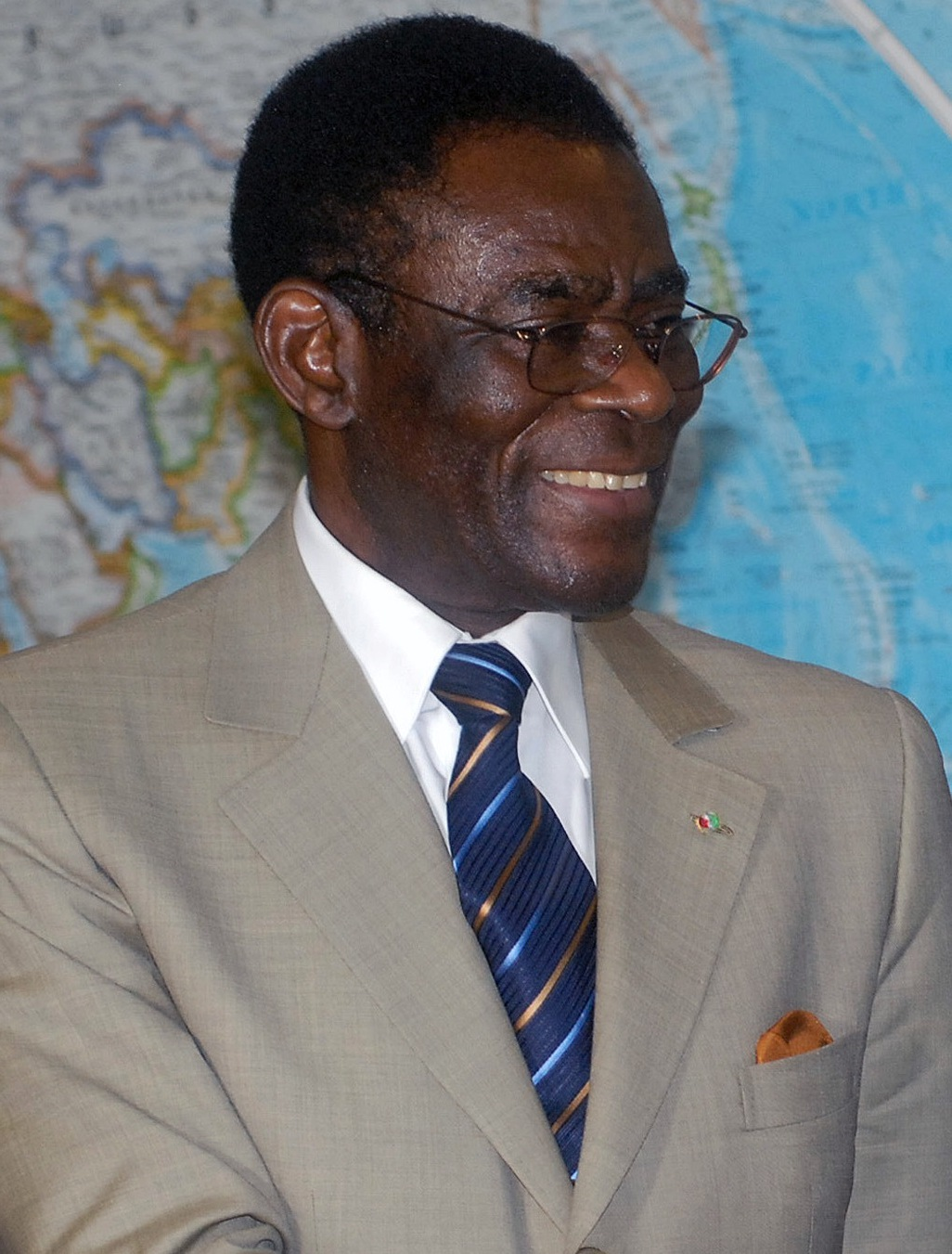

| Nominee | Teodoro Obiang Nguema Mbasogo | Celestino Bonifacio Bacalé |
| Party | PDGE | CPDS |
| Popular vote | 204,367 | 4,570 |
| Percentage | 97.06% | 2.17% |
President before election
Teodoro Obiang Nguema Mbasogo
PDGE
Elected President
Teodoro Obiang Nguema Mbasogo
PDGE

Presidential elections were held in Equatorial Guinea on 15 December 2002. Incumbent President Teodoro Obiang Nguema Mbasogo easily won another term amidst an opposition boycott.

== Boycotts ==
The four opposition candidates withdrew their candidacy on election day. The first opposition candidate to withdraw was Convergence for Social Democracy (CPDS) candidate Celestino Bonifacio Bacalé. He denounced the election, saying that "voting is totally fraudulent at every level. In 90% of the polling stations, the vote is being carried out in public, and people are being obliged to take only one voting slip, the one for Obiang". He also said that some designated polling stations did not actually exist, while some polling stations that were not designated had suddenly appeared; he also alleged that secret ballot envelopes were being opened and checked by electoral officials. Furthermore, according to Bacalé, some individuals in charge of polling stations had been deprived of that responsibility due to their insistence on having a free and fair election, and he said that the CPDS would not recognize the results. Despite Bacalé's withdrawal, his name remained on the ballot.

Aside from Bacalé, the other three withdrawn candidates were Secundino Oyono of the Social Democratic and Popular Convergence (CSDP), Jeremiah Ondo of the Popular Union (UP), and Buenaventura Mosuy of the Party of the Social Democratic Coalition. Severo Moto, an opposition leader in exile, said that there was no chance of a free and fair election.

== Conduct ==
President Obiang's Democratic Party of Equatorial Guinea (PDGE) said that voting occurred "in a normal and peaceful atmosphere", while Minister of the Interior Clemente Engonga denounced the withdrawal of the opposition candidates as "unlawful ... irresponsible and anti-democratic" and said that it was "proof of [their] bad faith and diabolical spirit". The opposition candidates demanded a new election "in the best conditions of freedom, legality and transparency".

One electoral observer, Ahmed Rajab, told the BBC that he had not seen "any irregularities as such", although he emphasized that he did not know what had occurred prior to the election and said that there might have been "an element of fear" involved in the support for Obiang. He said that the government was embarrassed by the loss of credibility caused by the opposition withdrawal, which left Obiang as the winner of what was effectively a one-candidate election.

== Results ==
Obiang received 97% of the votes, according to official results. Voter turnout was allegedly 98%. At least one voting district was recorded as giving Obiang 103% of the vote, a statistical impossibility without there having been electoral fraud.

| Candidate | Party | Votes | % |
|---|---|---|---|
| Teodoro Obiang Nguema Mbasogo | Democratic Party of Equatorial Guinea | 204,367 | 97.06 |
| Celestino Bonifacio Bacalé | Convergence for Social Democracy | 4,570 | 2.17 |
| Jeremías Ondo Ngomo | Popular Union of Equatorial Guinea | 663 | 0.31 |
| Buenaventura Monsuy Asumu | Party of the Social Democratic Coalition | 501 | 0.24 |
| Secundino Oyono Edú-Aguong Ada | Social Democratic and Popular Convergence | 449 | 0.21 |
| Total | | 210,550 | 100.00 |
| Valid votes | | 210,550 | 99.74 |
| Invalid/blank votes | | 554 | 0.26 |
| Total votes | | 211,104 | 100.00 |
| Registered voters/turnout | | 215,447 | 97.98 |
Source: African Elections Database
