= Purificación Angue Ondo =

Equatoguinean diplomat (born 1945)

Purificación Angue

Personal details
- Born: Purificación Angue Ondo Avomo; 30 April 1945 (age 80) Mongomo, Spanish Guinea

Purificación Angue Ondo Avomo (born 30 April 1945) is an Equatoguinean diplomat and former Minister of Women's and Children's Affairs. She has served as an ambassador to several countries, including Cameroon, Chad, the United States, and Spain. Dedicating her life to defending the rights of women and children, she has made a significant impact in policymaking and gender equality advocacy. She has had a "pivotal role in promoting the status of women within and beyond the frontiers of her country".

== Early life and education ==
Purificación Angue Ondo was born on 30 April 1945 in Mongomo. She graduated as a State Certified Teacher from the Spanish Government in 1964, when Equatorial Guinea during the colonial period. On 15 October 1968, she was appointed to the Ministry of Foreign Affairs.

== Political persecution and exile ==
Following Equatorial Guinea’s independence in 1968, Angue Ondo experienced intense political persecution under President Francisco Macías Nguema’s regime. Because of her education in prestigious institutions, her advocacy for women's rights, and her relationships with people of European descent, she became a target of systemic discrimination. She faced multiple arrests, beginning on 5 December 1968, for her status as an educated, independent woman, rather than for any criminal act. She eventually fled to Gabon on 30 December 1973, with her six children to escape further persecution and lived in exile until 1980. During her time in Gabon, she taught Spanish at Collège Notre-Dame de Quaben in Libreville and Collège d'Enseignement Secondaire Sainte Thérèse in Angone-Oyem. With the regime change on August 3, 1979, she returned to Equatorial Guinea in 1980 and began working at the Ministry of Education before entering the political arena.

== Political career ==
From 1981 to 1992, Angue Ondo held significant roles in the government, including Vice Minister and later Minister for Women's and Children's Affairs. She focused on promoting labor rights and gender equality, helping to establish policies that improved the welfare of women and children.

In 1990, she founded ABIFAGE, the Asociación de Bienestar Familiar de Guinea Ecuatorial, a non-governmental organization that supports family welfare. She collaborated with a Japanese NGO to establish schools in underserved areas, emphasizing education and community development.

== Diplomatic career ==
=== Cameroon and Chad (2000–2005) ===
Angue Ondo served as the Ambassador to Cameroon and Chad, where she built strong diplomatic and cultural relationships. At the end of her mission in Cameroon, she was decorated as a Knight of the Order of Valour by the Cameroonian government.

=== United States, Mexico, and Panama (2006–2012) ===
From 2006 to 2012, she served as Ambassador to the United States, with additional accreditation to Mexico and Panama. In Washington DC, she collaborated with Presidents George W. Bush and Barack Obama, promoting the interests of Equatorial Guinea.

=== Spain (2012–2021) ===
In 2012, she became the first woman to be appointed as Ambassador of Equatorial Guinea to Spain. She presented her credentials to King Juan Carlos I on 24 September 2013, and later worked with King Felipe VI to strengthen bilateral relations.

== Awards and recognitions ==
=== United Nations Population Award (1984) ===
Awarded by the United Nations Population Award (UNPFA) for her contributions to women's rights and family welfare.

=== Knight of the Order of Valour (2005) ===
Conferred by the Cameroonian government for her contributions to diplomacy.

=== Recognition from the Don Quixote Knights Brotherhood (2014) ===
Honored as “Dame of the Honorable International Brotherhood of the Knights of Don Quixote” by the César Egido Serrano Foundation.

=== Feature in Diplomacia Siglo XXI (2014) ===
Her diplomatic accomplishments were featured on the cover of Diplomacia Siglo XX I, a publication by the Diplomatic School of Spain.

=== Asturias Mundial Recognition ===
Asturias Mundial highlighted her career as the first woman to be appointed as Ambassador to Spain, recognizing her role in promoting gender equality and diplomatic excellence.
