= Malabo Government Building =

Government building in Malabo, Equatorial Guinea

Malabo Government Building (Spanish: Palacio Presidencial de Malabo)
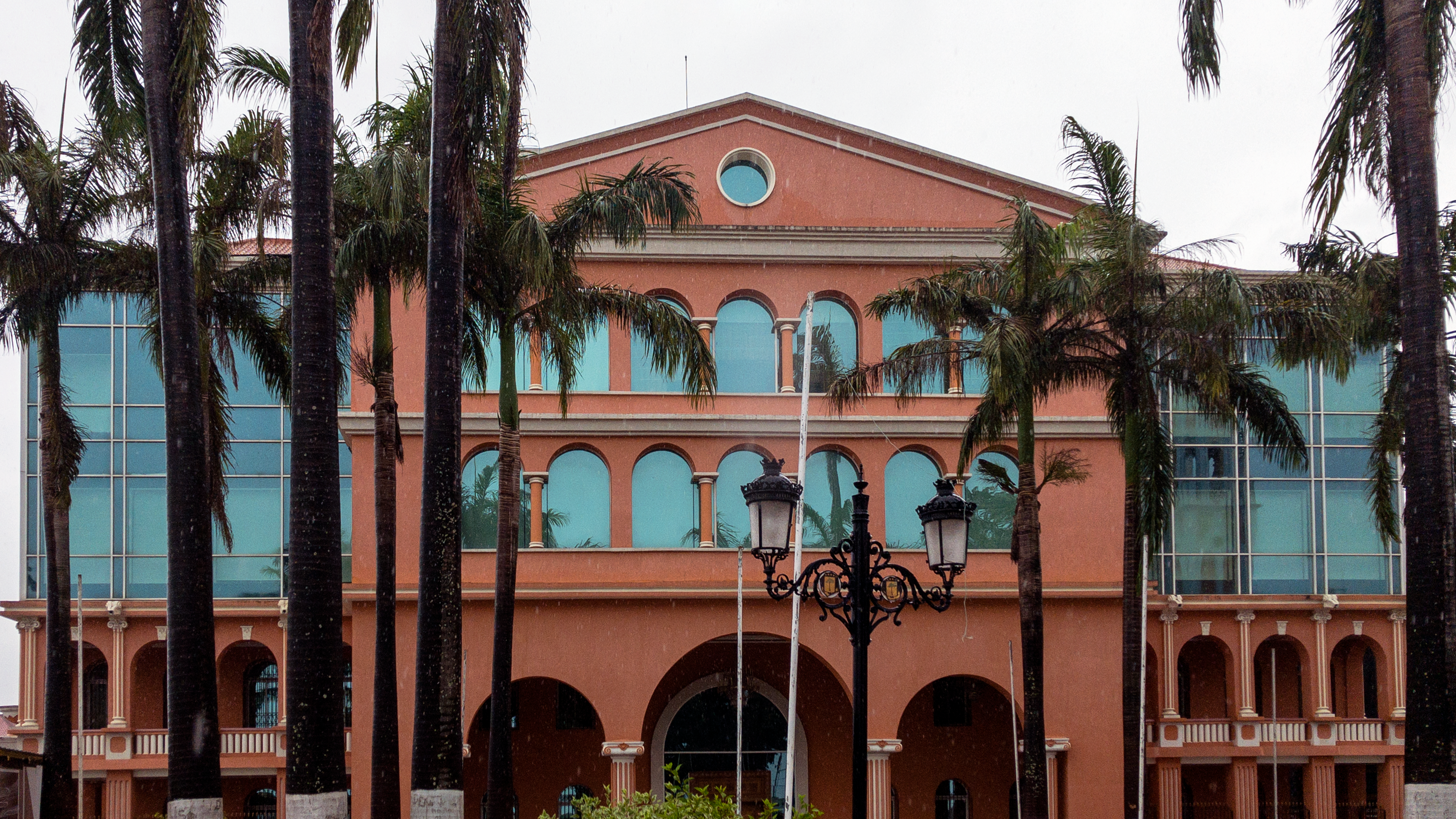
- The Malabo Government Building in 2019

General information
- Location: Malabo

The Malabo Government Building (Spanish: Palacio Presidencial de Malabo) is the residence of Teodoro Obiang Nguema Mbasogo, the President of Equatorial Guinea. It is located in Malabo, Equatorial Guinea, and was built in 1965.
