= 2016 Equatorial Guinean presidential election =

- 24 April 2016
- Registered: 325,548
- Turnout: 92.70%
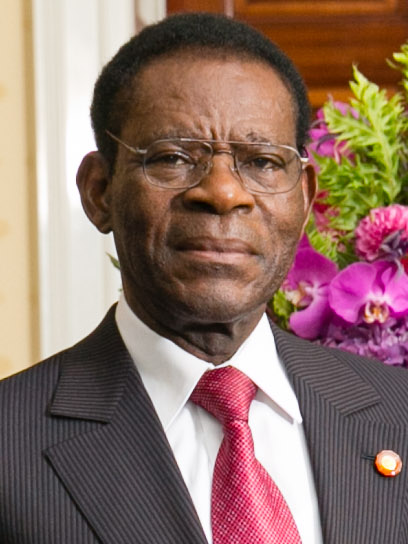

Nominee	Teodoro Obiang Nguema Mbasogo	Avelino Mocache
Party	PDGE	UCD
Popular vote	271,177	4,556
Percentage	93.53%	1.57%
- Results by district (districts won by Obiang in green)
President before election
Teodoro Obiang Nguema Mbasogo
PDGE
Elected President
Teodoro Obiang Nguema Mbasogo
PDGE

Presidential elections were held in Equatorial Guinea on 24 April 2016. In a vote initially scheduled for November but brought forward by seven months, incumbent President Teodoro Obiang Nguema Mbasogo retained his office, allegedly with 93.7 percent of the vote and a 92.7% turnout.

== Electoral system ==
The president is elected using the first-past-the-post system. After the 2011 constitutional referendum, presidents were limited to two terms of seven years and the age limit for candidates was removed. In addition, the post of Vice President was established, allowing the vice president to automatically assume power if the president died in office.

== Candidates ==
The leading candidate was incumbent president Teodoro Obiang Nguema Mbasogo, running for his first term after the 2011 constitutional referendum and sixth overall. He ran as the candidate of the Democratic Party of Equatorial Guinea, a coalition of ten parties, and was expected to win. At the time of the election, Obiang was the longest serving African president, having been in power since 1979. He was widely expected to win the vote.

The opposition were all mainly new faces with little political recognition and none of their parties were represented in Parliament. There were also three independent candidates, which critics claimed were dummy candidates to provide legitimacy for the elections. The Democratic Opposition Front, which is a coalition of dissident parties, boycotted the election, citing that the election would be "anti-constitutional" and that Obiang would win "with a big score as a result of fraud". Opposition candidate, Gabriel Nse Obiang Obono, was prevented from running for not meeting residency requirements.

== Conduct ==
Three days after the election date was announced, Human Rights Watch said that the Center for the Study and Initiatives for Development had been ordered to shut down. According to EG Justice, a member of opposition party Centre-Right Union was detained and beaten by authorities during the campaign. Reporters from Africa24 were also detained for five hours on entry into the country before being released.

The African Union sent an observer mission, led by former Beninese President Thomas Boni Yayi, on 13 April to oversee the conduct of the election.

== Results ==
The government announced on 28 April 2016 that Obiang had won the election by an overwhelming margin, as expected. Provisional results showed him with 93.7% of the vote on a turnout of 92.9%. He was sworn in for another term at a ceremony in Malabo on 20 May 2016.

Candidate	Party	Votes	%
Teodoro Obiang Nguema Mbasogo	Democratic Party of Equatorial Guinea	271,177	93.53
Avelino Mocache	Centre-Right Union	4,556	1.57
Buenaventura Monsuy Asumu	Party of the Social Democratic Coalition	4,417	1.52
Benedicto Obian Mangue	Independent	2,802	0.97
Carmelo Mba Bakalé	Popular Action of Equatorial Guinea	2,415	0.83
Agustín Masoko Abegue	Independent	2,412	0.83
Tomás Mba Monabang	Independent	2,154	0.74
Total		289,933	100.00
Valid votes		289,933	96.07
Invalid/blank votes		11,864	3.93
Total votes		301,797	100.00
Registered voters/turnout		325,548	92.70
Source: Government of Equatorial Guinea
