= Convergence for Social Democracy =

Political party in Equatorial Guinea

Convergence for Social Democracy Convergencia Para la Democracia Social
- President: Santiago Obama Ndong
- Secretary-General: Andres Esono Ondo
- Founded: 1990
- Headquarters: C/ Tres de Agosto, 72, 2º 1, Malabo
- Newspaper: La Verdad
- Ideology: Social democracy Democratic socialism
- Political position: Centre-left
- International affiliation: Socialist International; Progressive Alliance
- Chamber of Deputies: 0 / 100
- Senate: 0 / 55

Website
- www.cpdsge.org

Convergence for Social Democracy (Spanish: Convergencia para la Democracia Social, CPDS) is the largest opposition party in Equatorial Guinea. It was the only opposition party with parliamentary representation during 2013-2017.

== Structure ==
The CPDS is headed by a president and a secretary-general, who are currently Santiago Obama Ndong and Andres Esono Ondo, respectively. The Secretary-General is defined as the leader of the party, while the President is assigned the role of a moderator.

== History ==
After operating clandestinely and publishing its newspaper La Verdad ("The Truth") in the early 1990s, the CPDS applied for legal recognition in November 1992 and was given legal recognition in February 1993. The party was led and founded by Secundino Oyono Edú-Aguong. The CPDS attributed this recognition to international pressure.

In December 1994, the CPDS held its Constitutive Congress in Bata. The Congress chose Plácido Micó Abogo as Secretary-General at the head of an Executive Commission. The party held its Second National Congress in Bata in February 2001; Plácido Micó Abogo was again chosen as secretary-general. The Third National Congress, held in Bata in February 2005, again chose Plácido Micó Abogo as Secretary-General and elected a National Executive Commission.

Plácido Micó Abogo was the only CPDS candidate to win a seat in the 1999 legislative election. The party's candidate in the December 2002 presidential election was Celestino Bonifacio Bacalé, who withdrew from the election along with other opposition candidates due to alleged fraud and intimidation but remained on the ballot and won 2.2% of the vote; President Teodoro Obiang Nguema Mbasogo of the Democratic Party of Equatorial Guinea won 97.1%.

In the April 2004 parliamentary election, the party won two seats in the 100-member Chamber of People's Representatives, with CPDS candidates Plácido Micó Abogo and Bacalé winning seats from Malabo. In the May 2008 parliamentary election, it won one out of 100 seats; this seat was won by Plácido Micó Abogo.

Although the Convergence is a legally recognized party, its members are regularly detained and/or tortured by police. The CPDS acquired a radio station in August 2008 and began broadcasting from it in September. The police raided the CPDS headquarters on 13 September 2008, searching for the party's radio transmitter, although the police reportedly failed to find the transmitter and only seized electoral campaign material.

The CPDS is a full member of the Socialist International.

== Electoral history ==
=== Presidential elections ===
Election	Party candidate	Votes	%	Result
2002	Celestino Bonifacio Bacalé	4,570	2.17%	Lost ✗
2009	Plácido Micó Abogo	9,700	3.57%	Lost ✗
2016	Did not contest			
2022	Andrés Esono Ondó	9,684	2.31%	Lost ✗

=== Chamber of Deputies elections ===
Election	Party leader	Votes	%	Seats	+/–	Position	Result
1999	Plácido Micó Abogo	9,735	5.30%	1 / 80	▲1	▲3rd	Opposition
2004	Plácido Micó Abogo	12,202	6.03%	2 / 100	▲1	3rd	Opposition
2008	Plácido Micó Abogo			1 / 100	▼1	3rd	Opposition
2013	Andres Esono Ondo			1 / 100	Steady	▲2nd	Opposition
2017 (Note: Run as part of the Together We Can coalition (CPDS - UCD))	Andres Esono Ondo		2.23%	0 / 100	▼1	▼3rd	Extra-parliamentary
2022	Andres Esono Ondo			0 / 100	0		Extra-parliamentary

=== Senate elections ===
Election	Party leader	Votes	%	Seats	+/–	Position	Result
2013	Andres Esono Ondo			1 / 70	▲1	▲2nd	Opposition
2017 (Note: Run as part of the Together We Can coalition (CPDS - UCD))	Andres Esono Ondo		2.23%	0 / 70	▼1	▼3rd	Extra-parliamentary
2022	Andres Esono Ondo			0 / 70	0		Extra-parliamentary

==== Notes ====
15 members of the Senate are appointed by the President
