= List of presidents of Equatorial Guinea =

President of the Republic of Equatorial Guinea
- Presidente de la República de Guinea Ecuatorial (Spanish); Président de la République de Guinée-Équatoriale (French); Presidente da República da Guiné Equatorial (Portuguese)
- Coat of arms of Equatorial Guinea

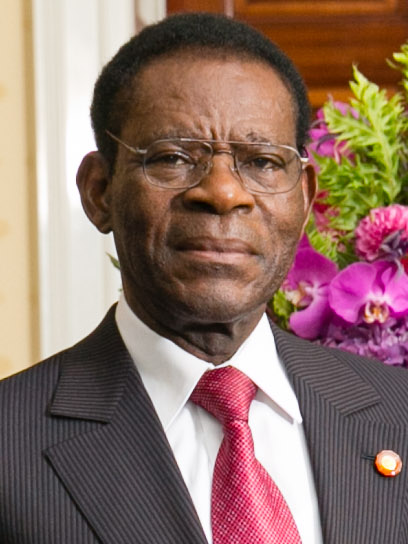
- Incumbent; Teodoro Obiang Nguema Mbasogo since 3 August 1979
- Executive branch of the Government of Equatorial Guinea
- Residence: Malabo Government Building
- Term length: 7 years; renewable once
- Precursor: Governor of Spanish Guinea
- Formation: 12 October 1968; 57 years ago
- First holder: Francisco Macías Nguema
- Deputy: Vice President of Equatorial Guinea
- Salary: 93,139,380 Central African CFA francs/152,680 USD annually
- Website: www.guineaecuatorialpress.com

The president of Equatorial Guinea is the head of state and head of government of Equatorial Guinea, a country in the Gulf of Guinea. The president has formal presidency over the Council of Ministers and is the commander-in-chief of the Armed Forces of Equatorial Guinea. Francisco Macías Nguema was the first person to hold the office, taking effect on 12 October 1968. The incumbent is Teodoro Obiang Nguema Mbasogo, having taken office on 3 August 1979.

== Term limits ==
As of 2021, there is a two-term limit for the president in the Constitution of Equatorial Guinea. The term limit has not been met by any president yet.

== List of officeholders ==
=== Prime minister of Spanish Guinea (1963–1968) ===
No.	Portrait	Name (Birth–Death)	Election	Term of office			Political party
No.	Portrait	Name (Birth–Death)	Election	Took office	Left office	Time in office	Political party
1		Bonifacio Ondó Edú (1922–1969)	1964	15 December 1963	12 October 1968	4 years, 302 days	MUNGE

== List ==
Political parties

Popular Idea of Equatorial Guinea (IPGE)
United National Workers' Party (PUNT)
Democratic Party of Equatorial Guinea (PDGE)

Other factions

Military
Independent

Symbols

^{C} Constitutional referendum

No.	Portrait	Name (Birth–Death)	Elected	Term of office			Political party
No.	Portrait	Name (Birth–Death)	Elected	Took office	Left office	Time in office	Political party
1		Francisco Macías Nguema (1924–1979) (Note: Changed name to Masie Nguema Biyogo Ñegue Ndong in 1976 due to the policy of Africanization.)	1968	12 October 1968	3 August 1979 (Deposed (Note: Executed by firing squad on 29 September 1979.))	10 years, 295 days	IPGE (until 1970)
		Francisco Macías Nguema (1924–1979)	1973 ^{[C]}	12 October 1968	3 August 1979 (Deposed)	10 years, 295 days	PUNT
2		Teodoro Obiang Nguema Mbasogo (Note: Nephew of Francisco Macías Nguema.) (born 1942); Chairman of the SMC from 1979 to 1982	—	3 August 1979	Incumbent	47 years, 63 days	Military (until 1982)
		Teodoro Obiang Nguema Mbasogo (born 1942); Chairman of the SMC from 1979 to 1982	1982 ^{[C]}	3 August 1979	Incumbent	47 years, 63 days	Independent (until 1987)
		Teodoro Obiang Nguema Mbasogo (born 1942); Chairman of the SMC from 1979 to 1982	1989; 1996; 2002; 2009; 2016; 2022	3 August 1979	Incumbent	47 years, 63 days	PDGE

== See also ==
- Politics of Equatorial Guinea
- Vice President of Equatorial Guinea
- List of prime ministers of Equatorial Guinea
- List of colonial governors of Spanish Guinea
