= 1982 Equatorial Guinean constitutional referendum =

15 August 1982
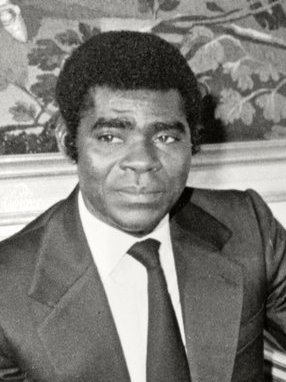
- Teodoro Obiang Nguema Mbasogo

Results
Choice	Votes	%
Yes	139,777	95.79%
No	6,149	4.21%
Valid votes	145,926	97.58%
Invalid or blank votes	3,619	2.42%
Total votes	149,545	100.00%
Registered voters/turnout	159,992	93.47%

A constitutional referendum was held in Equatorial Guinea on 15 August 1982 following the overthrow and execution of Francisco Macías Nguema in the 1979 coup d'état. The new constitution replaced the 1973 document and appointed Teodoro Obiang Nguema Mbasogo president for seven years, as well as making provisions for the protection of human rights and limited political representation. It was passed by 96% of voters with a 93% turnout.

== Results ==
Choice	Votes	%
For	139,777	95.79
Against	6,149	4.21
Total	145,926	100.00
Valid votes	145,926	97.58
Invalid/blank votes	3,619	2.42
Total votes	149,545	100.00
Registered voters/turnout	159,995	93.47
Source: African Elections Database
