= Chamber of Deputies (Equatorial Guinea) =

Lower house of the Parliament of Equatorial Guinea

Chamber of Deputies Cámara de los Diputados Chambre des députés Câmara dos Deputados

Type
- Type: Lower house Unicameral (1968–2012)

History
- Founded: 1968

Leadership
- President: Salomón Nguema Owono, Democratic Party of Equatorial Guinea since 29 August 2024

Structure
- Seats: 100
- Political groups: Government (100): Democratic Party of Equatorial Guinea (100)

Elections
- Voting system: Party-list proportional representation
- Last election: 20 November 2022

Meeting place
- Malabo

Website
- presidencia-ge.org/index.php/es/parlamento

The Chamber of Deputies (Spanish: Cámara de los Diputados; French: Chambre des députés; Portuguese: Câmara dos Deputados) is the lower house of the Parliament of Equatorial Guinea.

Although vested with considerable powers under the country's constitution, the Chamber has been dominated by the Democratic Party of Equatorial Guinea since its establishment, and there is virtually no opposition to executive decisions. Indeed, there have never been more than eight opposition legislators in the body.

== Latest election ==
The PDGE won all seats in parliament and in all municipal assemblies according to official results as well.

Party	Votes	%	Seats	+/–
Democratic Party of Equatorial Guinea			100	+1
Convergence for Social Democracy			0	New
Party of the Social Democratic Coalition			0	New
Total			100	0
Registered voters/turnout	427,671	–		
Source: Government of Equatorial Guinea

== Electoral system ==
The 100 members of the Chamber are elected by closed-list proportional representation in multi-member constituencies. Members serve five-year terms.

== Legislative history ==
The first legislative body was the unicameral General Assembly of Spanish Guinea (Spanish: Asamblea General) which was established in 1964, when Spanish Guinea was given autonomy. It was replaced by the Republican Assembly (Spanish: Asamblea de la Republica) in October 1968, which had 36 deputies elected for five-year terms. An upper house, the Republican Council (Spanish: Consejo de la Republica), was also created. Mba Ada was the first president of the Republican Council. The Council ceased to exist in 1973 when most of the members fled the country or were murdered. By 1974, every four out of five deputies of the earlier Republican Assembly had been murdered.

The Republican Assembly was replaced by the Popular National Assembly (Spanish: Asamblea Nacional Popular) in the Constitution of 1973. It had 60 deputies effectively selected by the United National Workers' Party (PUNT), the sole legal party at the time. The legislature was dissolved in 1979 following a coup d'état.

A unicameral House of Representatives of the People (Spanish: Cámara de los Representantes del Pueblo) was created in 1983. All members needed to swear an oath of allegiance to Obiang Nguema.

In 2013, an upper house was reintroduced in the form of a Senate, and the House of Representatives of the People became the lower chamber, renamed to the Chamber of Deputies.

== Presidents of the Legislatures ==
Name	Took office	Left office	Notes
Enrique Gori Molubela	1964	June 1965	Of General Assembly
Federico Ngomo	June 1965	1968	Of General Assembly
Pastor Torao Sikara	16 October 1968	5 March 1969	Of National Assembly
?	1969	August 1979	Of National Assembly
Legislature dissolved	August 1979	1983	
Francisco Bodien Ngalo	1983	November 1993	
Felipe Ondo Obiang	21 November 1993	November 1994	
Marcelino Nguema Onguene	November 1994	1999	
Salomón Nguema Owono	1999	18 June 2008	
Ángel Serafín Seriche Dougan	18 June 2008	12 July 2013	
Gaudencio Mohaba Mesu	12 July 2013	29 August 2024	
Salomón Nguema Owono	29 August 2024	Incumbent	

== See also ==
- List of legislatures by country
- Legislative branch
