= Democratic Party of Equatorial Guinea =

Ruling political party in Equatorial Guinea

Democratic Party of Equatorial Guinea Partido Democrático de Guinea Ecuatorial
- Abbreviation: PDGE
- President: Teodoro Obiang Nguema
- Secretary-General: Jerónimo Osa Osa Ecoro
- Founded: 11 October 1987 (39 years, 20 days)
- Headquarters: Malabo
- Ideology: See list: Nationalism; Right-wing populism; Economic liberalism; Neoliberalism; Personalism; Authoritarianism; Fang interests; Militarism; Self-proclaimed: Free market economics; Progressive liberalism; Social justice; Historical (1998–1999): Economic statism
- Political position: Right-wing to far-right
- International affiliation: Centrist Democrat International (observer)
- Chamber of Deputies: 100 / 100 (100%)
- Senate: 55 / 55 (100%)

Party flag

Website
- www.pdge-guineaecuatorial.com

The Democratic Party of Equatorial Guinea (Spanish: Partido Democrático de Guinea Ecuatorial, abbreviated PDGE) is the ruling political party in Equatorial Guinea. It was established by President Teodoro Obiang Nguema Mbasogo on 11 October 1987.

Prior to 1991, the PDGE was the sole legal political organization in the country. Still, the PDGE has been the dominant party since its inception, and it typically wins almost all seats in the Parliament. In the 2004 legislative election, 98 of 100 seats were won by either PDGE members or "opposition" parties that support Obiang; in the 2008 legislative election, the PDGE and its allies won a total of 99 out of 100 seats. There have never been more than eight true opposition deputies in the lower house, and the PDGE and its allies have won every seat in the upper chamber since its inception in 2013. Consequently, there is no substantive opposition to presidential decisions.

Similarly, Obiang typically wins 95 to 99% of the vote in presidential elections, with the opposition regularly calling for boycotts. In the 2016 presidential election, however, Obiang won around 93% of the vote, a new low for his presidency.

The party has been criticized for acting in an authoritarian manner and teaming up with the government to inform on political dissidents. The party is considered by the vast majority of international observers to be corrupt.

== Stances ==
The PDGE has little in the way of a platform or guiding ideology other than support for Obiang, although it has sometimes been described as pseudo-populist. One of its few concrete policy stances is support of foreign investment in the oil sector. Some of the few other tenets of the PDGE are militarism and anti-separatism (which often amounts to Fang chauvinism).

The community leaders in all of rural Equatorial Guinea are strongly pressured to be members of the party, and also pressure citizens throughout their communities into joining.

Although almost all the highest placed political appointments are held by former soldiers, the core military force, the army, remains somewhat underfunded in favour of naval and air force maintenance. Government expenditures are equal to less than 10% of GDP, with military expenditures accounting for roughly 25-35% of that figure. The amount of the budget spent on schooling, healthcare and other such investments is in proximity to the military budget. The constitution guarantees that the government will have a monopoly in certain industries, although much has been done to privatise these industries, in similar fashion to the way oil drilling was privatised. The party also has a minister for women, and has in recent years pursued a female empowerment agenda.

== Electoral history ==
=== Presidential elections ===
Election	Presidential candidate	Votes	%	Result
1989	Teodoro Obiang Nguema Mbasogo		99%	Elected ✓
1996	Teodoro Obiang Nguema Mbasogo	179,592	97.8%	Elected ✓
2002	Teodoro Obiang Nguema Mbasogo	204,367	97.1%	Elected ✓
2009	Teodoro Obiang Nguema Mbasogo	260,462	95.36%	Elected ✓
2016	Teodoro Obiang Nguema Mbasogo	271,177	92.70%	Elected ✓
2022	Teodoro Obiang Nguema Mbasogo	405,910	97.00%	Elected ✓

=== Chamber of Deputies elections ===
Election	Party leader	Votes	%	Seats	+/–	Position	Result
1988	Teodoro Obiang		99.2%	60 / 60	New	▲1st	Sole legal party
1993	Teodoro Obiang	54,589	69.8%	68 / 80	▲8	1st	Supermajority government
1999	Teodoro Obiang	156,949	85.5%	75 / 80	▲7	1st	Supermajority government
2004	Teodoro Obiang	99,892	49.4%	68 / 100	▼7	1st	Supermajority government
2008	Teodoro Obiang			89 / 100	▲21	1st	Supermajority government
2013	Teodoro Obiang			99 / 100	10	1st	Supermajority government
2017	Teodoro Obiang		92.00%	99 / 100	0	1st	Supermajority government
2022	Teodoro Obiang			100 / 100	▲1	1st	Supermajority government

=== Senate elections ===
Election	Party leader	Votes	%	Seats	+/–	Position	Result
2013	Teodoro Obiang			54 / 70	▲54	▲1st	Governing supermajority
2017	Teodoro Obiang		92.00%	55 / 70 (Note: 15 members of the Senate are appointed by the President.)	▲1	1st	Governing supermajority
2022	Teodoro Obiang			55 / 55	0	1st	Governing supermajority
