= Nguema family =

Equatoguinean political family

Nguema family Obiang family Obiang clan
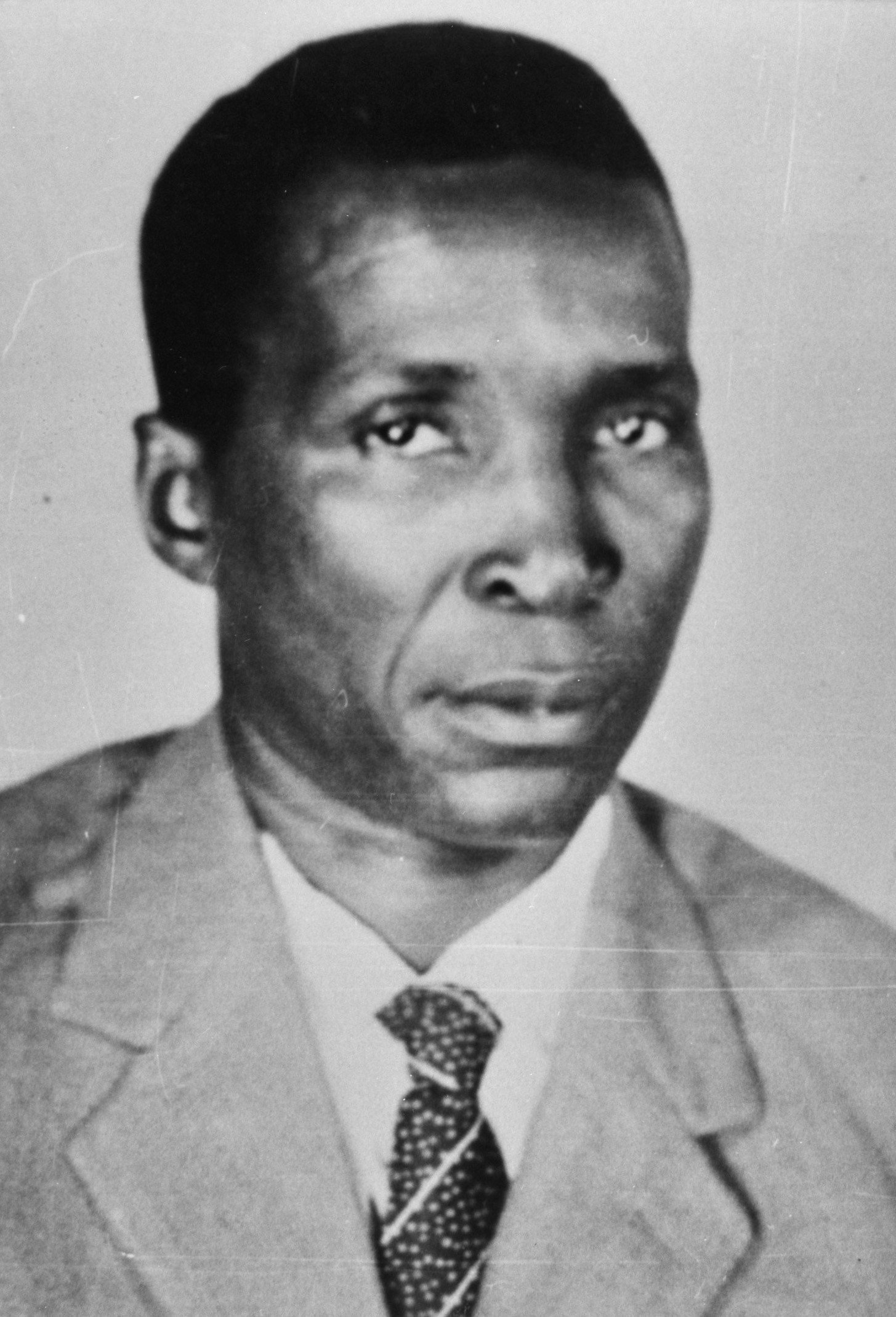
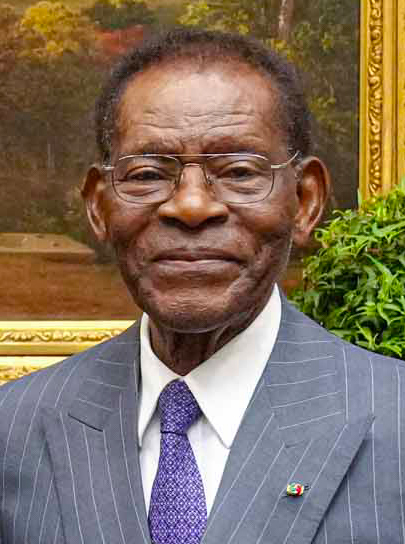
- Francisco Macías Nguema Teodoro Obiang Nguema Two members of the family which were Presidents
- Parent family: Esangui clan Mongomo clan
- Country: Republic of Equatorial Guinea

The Nguema family, also referred to as the Obiang family or Obiang clan, is a political family and the ruling family of Equatorial Guinea since its independence in 1968. Francisco Macías Nguema served as the first president of the country before being overthrown by his nephew Teodoro Obiang Nguema Mbasogo in 1979.

== History ==
The Nguema family has ruled Equatorial Guinea since 1968 and is seen as an example of a hereditary political dynasty in a republican country.

=== Before independence ===
Francisco Macías Nguema, originally named Mez-m Ngueme, was born on 1 January 1924, at Nzangayong, Spanish Guinea. His parents had been expelled with the rest of their clan from what is today Woleu-Ntem Province, Gabon, at a time when the Spanish Colonial Guard had not yet exerted control over the jungled area. The family was part of the Esangui clan of the Fang people, Equatorial Guinea's majority ethnic group. His family settled in Mongomo, where he was raised. Differing accounts exist of Macías Nguema's parentage and childhood, with some alleging that he was the son of a witch doctor who allegedly killed his younger brother as a sacrifice. Other accounts claims that his father was merely a local Fang nobel. According to this version, at age nine, Macías saw his father being fatally beaten by a local colonial administrator, when he tried to use his title to negotiate better wages for his people. Macías was orphaned a week later when his mother committed suicide, leaving him and 10 siblings to fend for themselves.

== Members ==
- Pedro Mez-m-Ngueme
- Emilia Ñegue Ndong
- Ten siblings of Macías
- One younger brother of Macías (alleged)
- Francisco Macías Nguema
- Clara Angue Osa
- Mónica Bindang Ayong
- Rita Flores Mernicon
- Mónica Macías
- Maribel Macías
- Paco Macías
- Filiberto Ntutumu Nguema
- Teonesto Nguema
- Santiago Nguema Eneme
- Obama María Mbasogo Ngui
- Carmen Mikue Mbira
- Armengol Ondo Nguema
- Antonio Mba Nguema
- Unnamed brother of Teodoro
- Six other sons of Santiago Nguema Eneme
- First wife of Antonio
- Second wife of Antonio
- 17 children of Antonio
- Teodoro Obiang Nguema Mbasogo
- Constancia Mangue
- Teodoro Nguema Obiang Mangue
- Two other sons of Constancia Mangue
- Celestina Lima
- Gabriel Mbega Obiang Lima
- Virginia Esther Mayé
- Florencio Mayé Elá
- Three children of Gabriel

=== Connected members ===
- Manuel Balboa
- Isabel Arkins
- Abilio Balboa Arkins
- Armando Balboa
- Other two children of Arkins

== Family tree ==
Family tree of the Nguema family.

== See also ==
- Bongo family
- Gouled-Guelleh family
