= Nguema =

Nguema is a Fang masculine name. It may refer to two different post-colonial leaders of Equatorial Guinea:

- Francisco Macías Nguema (January 1, 1924 – September 29, 1979)
- Teodoro Obiang Nguema Mbasogo (born June 5, 1942).

The Nguema family also includes:

- Armengol Ondo Nguema, the younger brother of president Obiang Nguema and head of the president's security bodyguards.
- Teodorín Nguema Obiang, the favorite son of president Obiang Nguema.
- Patrick Nguema Ndong (1957–2021), Franco-Gabonese journalist

Also:

- CD Elá Nguema, a football club, from Malabo, Equatorial Guinea
- Brice Clotaire Oligui Nguema, Gabonese officer and coup d'état leader
