= Ministry of Defence (Equatorial Guinea) =

Government ministry of Equatorial Guinea

The Ministry of Defence (Spanish: Ministerio de Defensa) is a department of the Government of Equatorial Guinea responsible for military administration. It is the administrative and executive body of the Armed Forces of Equatorial Guinea. It is under the supervision of the Vice President of Equatorial Guinea in charge of National Defense and Security, Teodoro Nguema Obiang Mangue.

== History ==
After the 1979 Equatorial Guinea coup d'état in which Lieutenant Colonel Teodoro Obiang Nguema Mbasogo assumed the Presidency of the Republic from his uncle Francisco Macías Nguema and created the Supreme Military Council, a draft decree on "Organization" was drawn up. structuring of higher organisms require any higher degree related to the area of their responsibility. A Spanish military delegation helped draft the reorganization of the Ministry of Defense in the 1980s.

== List of ministers ==
This lists the Defence Ministers of Equatorial Guinea:

Minister	President	Start	End	Ref
Francisco Macías Nguema	Francisco Macías Nguema	October 1968	November 1976 or later	
Teodoro Obiang Nguema Mbasogo	Francisco Macías Nguema		3 August 1979	
Antonio Mba Nguema	Teodoro Obiang Nguema Mbasogo	2004	2016	
?	Teodoro Obiang Nguema Mbasogo	2016	2020	
Victoriano Bibang Nsue Okomo	Teodoro Obiang Nguema Mbasogo	August 2020	Present	
