= Malabo Mosque =

Mosque in Equatorial Guinea

- Mezquita de Malabo (Spanish); Mosquée de Malabo (French); Mesquita Malabo (Portuguese)
- Location within Equatorial Guinea

Religion
- Affiliation: Islam
- Branch/tradition: Sunni

Location
- Location: Malabo, Bioko Norte, Equatorial Guinea
- Coordinates: 03°43′12″N 08°42′57″E

Architecture
- Type: mosque
- Funded by: Constancia Mangue
- Established: 21 July 2015
- Construction cost: 2 billion Central African CFA francs
- Capacity: 2,000

Malabo Mosque (Spanish: Mezquita de Malabo; French: Mosquée de Malabo; Portuguese: Mesquita Malabo) also known as Malabo Central Mosque (Spanish: Mezquita Central de Malabo) is a mosque in Malabo, Equatorial Guinea. It is the largest mosque in Equatorial Guinea and can accommodate two thousand people.

== History ==
Hausa Muslims from Cameroon and Nigeria built a mosque in Malabo sometime in the early 20th century. They sold African masks and statues to European settlers and supplied plantation managers with imported goods such as medicine brought in from Nigeria. The mosque they built no longer exists, having been demolished due to its dilapidated state. It was replaced by a temporary mosque in the northern suburbs of Malabo.

In 2014, the First Lady of Equatorial Guinea, Constancia Mangue, agreed to finance the construction of a new mosque in the city. The approximate cost of the mosque was two billion Central African CFA francs or about three million euros.

On 21 July 2015, Malabo Mosque was officially opened by the President of Equatorial Guinea Teodoro Obiang Nguema Mbasogo, his wife and the two vice presidents Ignacio Milam Tang and Teodoro Nguema Obiang Mangue. The inauguration of the mosque was also attended by the Prime Minister of Egypt Ibrahim Mahlab, President of the Comoros Ikililou Dhoinine and Sahrawi Arab Democratic Republic politician Mohamed Lamine Ould Ahmed who was both the Minister of Health and Special Envoy to the African Summit on Ebola. Mahlab and the Ministry of Awqaf provided imams and preachers to the mosque as part of Egypt's role spreading the teachings of Islam. The imam and spiritual leader of the Muslim community of Equatorial Guinea, Pedro Benigno Matute Tang began the ceremony with words of thanks. In his inauguration ceremony speech, President Obiang said that the mosque will be an "Islamic beacon of coexistence" for "social and religious tolerance". He also said that Islam cannot be viewed as a "religion of terror, discrimination or extremism".

In 2020, two Equatoguinean Muslims were given Samsung-branded products in an award ceremony at the mosque as part of a contest to encourage young people to read and study.

== See also ==
- Islam in Equatorial Guinea
