= Teodoro Obiang =

Teodoro Obiang may refer to:

- Teodoro Obiang Nguema Mbasogo (born 1942), president of Equatorial Guinea
- Teodoro Nguema Obiang Mangue (born 1968), son of the President
