= Corruption in Equatorial Guinea =

Corruption in Equatorial Guinea is high by world standards and considered among the worst of any country on earth. It has been described as "an almost perfect kleptocracy" in which the scale of systemic corruption and the rulers' indifference towards the people's welfare place it at the bottom of every major governance indicator or ranking, below nations with similar per capita GDPs.

"Few countries symbolize oil-fuelled corruption and nepotism more than Equatorial Guinea", wrote Jan Mouawad in The New York Times in July 2009. Its corruption system, according to the Open Society Foundations (OSF), is "unparalleled in its brazenness". This government is controlled by a limited group of powerful individuals who divert most of the country's revenues into their own clandestine bank accounts in other nations. Equatorial Guinea's corruption is so entrenched, scholar Geoffrey Wood has claimed, that it can be classified as a criminal state.

This situation is especially dramatic due in large part to the massive scale of the country's revenues from oil and other natural resources. The Guardian noted that the nation is enormously wealthy due to vast oil reserves, but that that wealth is concentrated in the hands of an elite minority. Despite its GDP per capita of $18,236 – which makes it richer than most African countries and places it below China – Equatorial Guinea is ranked 145th out of 189 countries in the Human Development Index measure of quality of life. While the people of Equatorial Guinea technically have a per capita GDP similar to China, the vast majority live in poverty worse than Afghanistan or Chad, according to Arvind Ganesan of Human Rights Watch in 2009, attributing this disparity to the government's corruption, incompetence, and disregard of its own people's well-being. Most people in Equatorial Guinea remain in abject poverty, with no access to healthcare or education. Meanwhile, any criticism of the ruling class is non-existent due to the government's use of force and intimidation to silence opposition.

Sasha Lezhnev of Global Witness noted in 2008 that the government earns oil revenues in the billions yearly, while the population lives on less than $1 a day. President Teodoro Obiang is said to have control over the oil reserves and the government, Ganesan claimed, and consequentially the country's immensely rich treasury is "a private cash machine for a few" rather than used for any public benefit. According to the Financial Times, foreign diplomats joke that Equatorial Guinea is a family-run business which holds a seat at the UN. The nation is known among foreign businessmen as a poor environment for business and investments. The individual who has become most associated in the international media with the corruption of Equatorial Guinea's leaders is Teodorin Obiang, a son of the president whose lavish lifestyle in southern California, Paris, and elsewhere has made headlines and been the target of investigations by American and French authorities, among others.

Because of the levels of corruption, the country always ranks near the bottom of Transparency International's (TI) Corruption Perceptions Index. In 2025, Equatorial Guinea scored 15 on a scale from 0 ("highly corrupt") to 100 ("very clean"). When ranked by score, Equatorial Guinea ranked 172nd among the 182 countries in the Index, where the country ranked first is perceived to have the most honest public sector. For comparison with regional scores, the best score among sub-Saharan African countries (Note: Angola, Benin, Botswana, Burkina Faso, Burundi, Cameroon, Cape Verde, Central African Republic, Chad, Comoros, Côte d'Ivoire, Democratic Republic of the Congo, Djibouti, Equatorial Guinea, Eritrea, Eswatini, Ethiopia, Gabon, Gambia, Ghana, Guinea, Guinea-Bissau, Kenya, Lesotho, Liberia, Madagascar, Malawi, Mali, Mauritania, Mauritius, Mozambique, Namibia, Niger, Nigeria, Republic of the Congo, Rwanda, Sao Tome and Principe, Senegal, Seychelles, Sierra Leone, Somalia, South Africa, South Sudan, Sudan, Tanzania, Togo, Uganda, Zambia, and Zimbabwe.) was 68, the average was 32 and the worst was 9. For comparison with worldwide scores, the best score was 89 (ranked 1), the average was 42, and the worst was 9 (ranked 181, in a two-way tie).

Equatorial Guinea is the only nation in the world since 2008 to receive a score of 'zero' for budget transparency. In 2008, a U.S. State Department report indicated that officials in Equatorial Guinea are frequently engaging in corruption and illegal practices with impunity. In 2014, the country received a score of zero on TI's Open Budget Index. From 1996 to 2013, the Economic Intelligence Unit gave the country a score of 0.0 for "control of corruption". On the National Resource Governance Institute's Resource Governance Index, Equatorial Guinea received a "failing" score of 13/100, ranking 56th out of 58 countries. On "reporting practices", it received a score of 14/100, for a rank of 55th.

In 2011, Freedom House put Equatorial Guinea in its "worst of the worst" category for governments that violate human rights and civil liberties, which also includes North Korea, Sudan, and Turkmenistan. In its 2014 world report, Human Rights Watch (HRW) stated: "Corruption, poverty, and repression continue to plague Equatorial Guinea. ... Vast oil revenues fund lavish lifestyles for the small elite surrounding the president, while a large proportion of the population continues to live in poverty. Mismanagement of public funds and credible allegations of high-level corruption persist, as do other serious abuses, including arbitrary detention, secret detention, and unfair trials."

== Corruption system ==
=== Nepotism ===
This corruption system has existed in more or less its present form since the early 1980s, when the government seized farmland on Bioko Island belonging mostly to Spanish and Portuguese owners and redistributed it to members of the Nguema/Mongomo group.

==== The Nguema/Esangui group ====
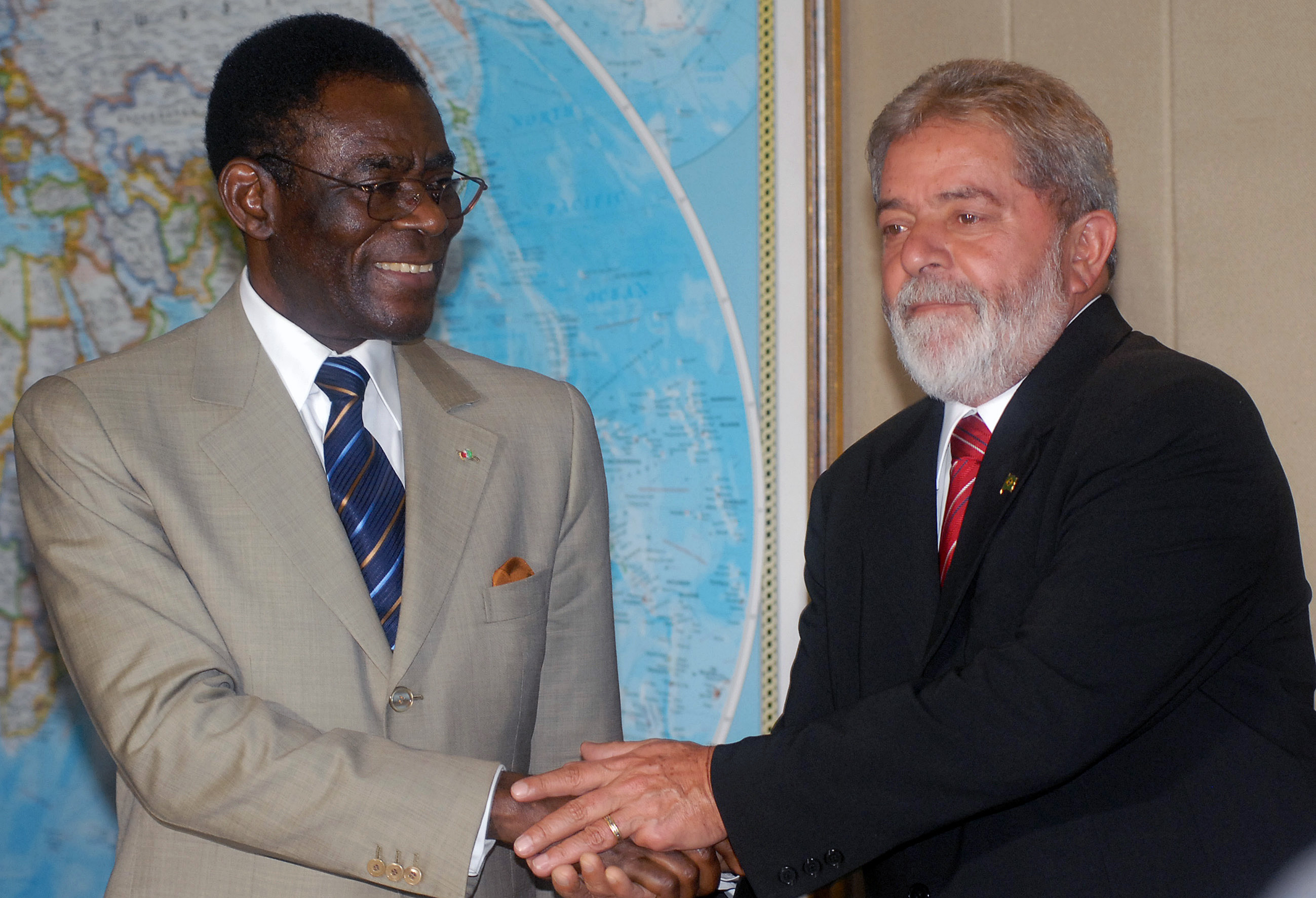
Teodoro Obiang Nguema Mbasogo with then-President of Brazil, Luiz Inácio Lula da Silva.

Corruption in Equatorial Guinea is carried out via an elaborate system that is the exclusive province of President Obiang and his circle, known collectively as "the Nguema/Esangui group". The members of this group divert revenue from Equatorial Guinea's natural resources, including land and hydrocarbon, to their own private accounts.

Equatorial Guinea's corruption system has been called "a seamless and self-reinforcing web of political, economic, and legal power", whereby the members of the Nguema/Esangui group employ the power of the government to enrich themselves. Their increasing wealth enables them, in turn, to finance ever more efficiently their political machine that subverts and undermines effective opposition through repression, intimidation, violence, and bribery. Meanwhile, the group's domination of the legal system enables them to make their misappropriation of wealth appear lawful.

Several sources indicate that there are serious tensions within the group, with considerable competition for power and favors.

=== Foreign bank accounts and shell companies ===
Between 1995 and 2004, much of the money extorted from the people of Equatorial Guinea by the Nguema/Mongomo group was deposited in Riggs Bank in Washington, D.C. According to Human Rights Watch, Riggs had been aware of the level of corruption and human rights concerns in the country.

A 2004 U.S. Senate probe determined that Equatorial Guinea's oil-revenues account at Riggs Bank was controlled by three persons: President Obiang, Africa's longest-serving dictator; his son Gabriel Mbega Obiang Lima (who is minister of mines); and his nephew, Melchor Esono Edjo (who is secretary of state for treasury and budget). Two signatures, the President's and that of either his son or nephew, were required to remove funds from the account. From 2000 to 2003, about $34 million was transferred from that account into foreign bank accounts held by shell corporations – for example, an account at Spain's Banco Santander owned by Kalunga S.A., a firm registered in Panama, and an account at HSBC Luxembourg owned by Apexside Trading Ltd. Probes by a Spanish NGO and by the Open Society Justice Initiative showed that millions of dollars from the Kalunga account were spent on properties in Spain purchased in the names of President Obiang and other high officials, former high officials, and Obianga relatives.

=== Later expropriations ===
Since then, the government has expropriated other valuable land, mostly the homes of poor and middle-class Equatoguineans. Thousands of people have been the victims of these seizures, for which very few of them are compensated and in response to which they have no legal recourse. Many of those who have protested these expropriations have been abused and intimidated by soldiers or police. Officially, these lands are seized for public purposes, but in fact they have ended up in the hands of members of the Nguema/Esangui group, who have built homes or businesses on the properties. In 2003, for example, Le Temps (Geneva) reported on a village in which 75 people lived in abject poverty, having been uprooted by the regime from their homes, which had been used to construct a methanol factory without compensation or apology. A 2013 Amnesty report stated that over 1,000 families in the country had been forcibly removed from their homes so that the government could build roads, luxury homes and hotels, and shopping centers. Many of the homes demolished were in perfect shape, with the vast majority of those living there holding land titles. Despite promises from the government to relocate victims to new homes, to date, no one has been compensated in any way.

=== Exploitation of natural resources ===
The 1990s saw the discovery of petroleum and natural gas in the waters off Equatorial Guinea. The "oil rush" began in 1995 when ExxonMobil began working the Zafiro field; shortly after, Hess and Marathon also began exploiting the nation's natural-gas reserves. By 2005, Equatorial Guinea was sub-Saharan Africa's third-largest oil producer, after Nigeria and Angola. Even as the oil and gas business has thrived, however, most Equatoguineans have continued to support themselves through subsistence farming and lived almost exclusively outside of the nation's monetary economy. This is because government authorities have used their political power to limit participation in the exploitation of the country's natural resources to themselves and other members of the Nguema/Mongomo group, granting business licenses and approvals only to the chosen few. Agencies that provide jobs in these businesses are also owned by members of the group, and the granting of such jobs is also limited in a similar way.

=== Other forms of corruption ===
Other means by which members of Nguema/Mongomo group enrich themselves include "sweetheart" co-investments with foreign companies (deals with such favorable terms they cannot logically be passed up), rigged contracts, bribes from foreign companies to the Nguema/Mongomo group, and monopoly arrangements for all Nguema/Mongomo enterprises involved in the petroleum and gas industry.

For example, a U.S. Senate probe noted that Mobil, in 1998–99, had sold a 15% stake in a joint business, Mobil Oil Guinea Ecuatorial (MOGE), to the Obiang-owned company Socio Abayak, S.A., for $2,300. By 2004, Abayak's MOGE holdings were worth $645,000. ExxonMobil could not explain the sale to Senate investigators. Another firm, Marathon, has paid Obiang over $2 million for land. Amerada Hess paid government officials and their relatives nearly $1 million for building leases. Of 28 properties Hess leased in Equatorial Guinea, 18 were owned by Obiang family members and persons connected to the family. Representatives for both Hess and ExxonMobil told U.S. Senate investigators that they had purchased their security services in Equatorial Guinea, at non-negotiable prices, from Sociedad Nacional de Vigilancia (Sonavi), which is owned by Obiang's brother, Armengol Ondo Nguema, and which has a monopoly on security services in the country.

As of 2009, according to the U.S. State Department, most ministers in Equatorial Guinea also operate conflated businesses along with their government responsibilities. For instance, the minister of justice owns his own private law firm, while the minister of transport and communications was director of the firm's board and owned shares in both the parastatal airline and the national telephone company. In addition, in 2008, when the government began distributing funds for social projects for the social development fund (SDF), a development mechanism created jointly with foreign investors to promote a culture of transparency and openness, one minister reportedly chose his own firm to receive funds rather than any bidding firms. It also surfaced that the minister had not even placed a bid of their own. The minister defended his actions by claiming his firm was eligible to receive SDF money.

== Members of the Obiang Nguema/Esangui group ==
=== President Obiang ===
The President has been criticized as living a life of lavish and absurd luxury yielding considerable waste. He has six personal aircraft, homes in Cape Town, Paris, Madrid, Las Palmas and Maryland, and bank accounts in numerous countries, including France and Switzerland. He bought a $2.6 million residence in Potomac, Maryland, in 1999. A 2001 memorandum noted the sale by Obiang of two properties in Spain for $5 million, which was deposited in Riggs Bank.

=== Constancia Mangue ===
Obiang's so-called "senior wife", Constancia Mangue (he has five wives), who is considered first lady, is minister of health and social action. She bought her own $1.15 million residence in Potomac, Maryland, not to be confused with her husband's home in the same city. At one point, five accounts and three certificates of deposit at Riggs Bank were held in Constancia's name, and ExxonMobil made several payments into these accounts. Andrew P. Swiger of ExxonMobil told investigators that his firm co-owned the Obiang energy firm Abayak with Constancia, who, he said, received 15 percent of all revenue from Abayak.

A company called Nusiteles, G.E., founded in 2000 to provide domestic telephone and computer services, is partly owned by the Obiangs through Abayak, and partly owned by other high Equatoguinean officials. As of 2004, Abayak is the only construction company in all of Equatorial Guinea.

The President and First Lady also own two clinics called Virgen de Guadalupe, which came to light in January 2009 when a Paraguayan couple who had worked at the clinics were arrested in January 2009 for stealing 6.1 million euros in cash, jewelry, and other valuables.

In October 2013, according to a Spanish news source, Contancia Mangue and Cristina Lima, another of Obiang's wives, got into a heated argument over dinner with Obiang. Mangue accused Lima, who was described as the country's second lady, of doing nothing to help the country's women. In return, Lima accused Mangue of looting the nation's wealth. Obiang reportedly intervened several times and told his wives to go to their own hometowns.

=== Gabriel Mbaga Obiang Lima ===
Another Obiang son, Gabriel (Gabi) Mbaga Obiang Lima, is the minister of mines, industry, and energy, and has the power to arrange oil concessions. Lima, whose mother is Obiang's second wife, Celestine Lima, has been called the "lord and master" of Equatorial Guinea's oil industry. He controls the production of half a million barrels of oil per day and travels frequently to such countries as Angola, Malaysia, France, China, the United States, Canada, Brazil, Britain, Switzerland, and Trinidad and Tobago, where he has lucrative business partners and, in some cases, numbered bank accounts and safe-deposit boxes. A 2012 article in a Spanish news source lamented that the extensive media attention accorded to Teodorin's corruption had overshadowed the investigation by Spanish authorities of Gabi's money-laundering in Spain and his purchase of various properties in that country.

=== Candido Nsue Okomo ===
Until early 2015, Candido Nsue Okomo, the First Lady's brother, served as head of the state-owned oil company, GEPetrol. Foreign oil executives complained that Okomo made ludicrous and impossible demands of them and hindered investments. The Netherlands-based Centre for Research on Multinational Corporations noted that President Obiang and his family have personal interests in GEPetrol and that Transparency International gave GEPetrol a low score for transparency in its 2008 revenue report, indicating the company to be highly opaque. Okomo is now Minister of Youth and Sports.

=== Ruslan Obiang ===
Ruslan Obiang, a son of the President, is Equatorial Guinea's sports minister and president of a top soccer club, the "Panthers". He has lived in Spain, where he encouraged firms to do business in his country. Several Spanish businessmen have complained about the consequences of these deals. One Spaniard who had paid $200,000 to secure a contract to build soccer stadiums described a system that involved bribes at every turn. After paying bribes for years, however, his deal eventually fell apart when he refused to pay any more bribes to Ruslan Obiang and his associates. The businessman was critical of business in the country, saying officials exploit as much money as possible until moving on to another contractor. The businessman also noted that he had been threatened on several occasions, both with violence, and trumped-up rape charges that could have resulted in his being imprisoned. His report claimed that there is no avenue for justice in the nation, since "[t]he corruption is absolute and endemic; there is nobody you can turn to." After the deal collapsed, one of his business partners was visited at his Portugal home by men in dark suits who staked outside his home for several days as a threat and then visited him in his office. Herein, they warned him that if he reported his story to the media or any authorities, there would be consequences. He concluded: "You sign a contract with the son of the president and you believe it is worth something. You have no idea what is going to happen to you. We had to flee the country. We were afraid for our lives."

=== Ricardo Mangue Obama Nfubea ===
Ricardo Mangue Obama Nfubea became prime minister in 2006 and promised to fight corruption. However, his purported efforts have had almost no impact on corruption in the country.

=== Emilio Oñebula ===
A foreign businessman complained that his difficulties with doing business in Equatorial Guinea only became worse when he was required to deal with Emilio Oñebula, a senior official in the sports ministry: "Everything is so easy that you fall for it. As long as you are paying them, they do not leave you alone for a moment. Initially, I thought that this was just the way they did things, but I later realized that they are simply keeping an eye on you. If you went out alone, they got angry. We were watched the whole time."

=== Teodorin Obiang ===
Teodoro Nguema Obiang, known as Teodorin, is the President's oldest son and was for many years the country's minister of forestry. He has been sardonically called "the world's richest minister of agriculture and forestry." Through his solely owned firm Grupo Sofana and its affiliate Somagui Forestal, Teodorin owned, and may still own, "exclusive rights of exploiting and exporting timber in Equatorial Guinea." Teodorin also owns the nation's only TV station, as well as Radio Asonga, the nation's main radio station. In May 2012, he was removed from the ministry and given the title of "second vice president", a position that is not mentioned in the nation's constitution, and placed in charge of state security.

The heir apparent to the presidency, Teodorin has been described as "fantastically corrupt" and has been called "an unstable, reckless idiot" by a former U.S. intelligence official. His lifestyle, which has been characterized by Foreign Policy as a "surreal playboy life", has been the focus of media attention around the world, making him the personification of the Obiang regime's corruption.

A 2009 article in The New York Times stated that U.S. officials believed that the vast majority of Teodorin's assets derived "from corruption related to the extensive oil and gas reserves discovered more than a decade and a half ago off the coast of his tiny West African country." Another source of Teodorin's wealth, according to the article, was a tax on timber, the payments of which were made directly to him. The Justice Department also suggested that Teodorin might be taking bribes or extortion payments from oil companies. Later investigations by the U.S. Senate and other bodies (see below) established many of the sources of his wealth and uncovered details of his personal expenditures.

Teodorin "shamelessly looted his government and shook down businesses in his country to support his lavish lifestyle, while many of his fellow citizens lived in extreme poverty", said U.S. Assistant Attorney General Leslie Caldwell in 2014. Although Teodorin's annual salary was about $100,000, he had managed "through bribes, kickbacks, embezzlement, and extortion" to accumulate a fortune of over $300 million, including major U.S. assets owned and acquired through shell companies and third parties.

The U.S. Department of Justice has accused Teodorin of carrying out "corruption schemes" and charging businesses illegal commissions. It has further charged him with extorting France's Isoroy, Spain's ABM, and Italy's Agroforestal. "He threatened timber companies, among them Isoroy and ABM, that refused to meet his payment demands", according to the charge. One Spanish businessman told El Pais in 2013 that he and his business partners had run several firms in Malabo and Bata between 2009 and 2011, and simply to meet with Teodorín at his house in Paris to make necessary arrangements, required payment of a so-called "intentions royalty" of 40,000 to 100,000 euros. Also, the government compelled foreign businessmen to leave machinery behind when they were done with it so that the government could keep it. "If you don't accept," said the businessman, "you know that you will end up in the Black Beach prison."

Another Spanish businessman, who supervised ABM's operations in Equatorial Guinea from 1995 to 1997, said Teodorín "would call us to come to his office, which meant wearing a suit and tie. He would keep you waiting for five hours and then appear wearing shorts. He would then tell you how much he wanted you to pay him, and that you had a week to do so, saying: 'If you don't pay, we will confiscate the machinery and give your concession to the Chinese.' We had to flee the country. He was demanding millions. The only ones who stayed were those who paid him." Yet another Spanish firm, which was forced to work with a local company on whose board of directors Teodorin sat, "had to pay commissions at every stage of the way" and was confronted "with permits and other obstacles"; after the firm had filled a warehouse with timber, one member of the firm was arrested and imprisoned on trumped-up charges of rape, apparently a standard way of treating foreign businesspeople. "He caught malaria and had a fever. ... In return for being allowed to leave, he had to agree to leave all his money and the timber warehouse behind."

As of March 2014, Roberto Berardi, an Italian businessman who partnered with Teodorin in a construction company, was serving a 28-month sentence in Bata prison after being found guilty on charges of misappropriation brought by Teodorin; Bernardi has said "he was unjustly jailed after he demanded explanations from Teodorin for their company, Eloba Construccion S.A., being named in the U.S. investigation against the vice-president."

==== Activities in the U.S. ====
In 1991, Teodorin, then 22, enrolled in an English language course at Pepperdine University in Malibu. Walter International, a U.S. energy firm with a stake in Equatorial Guinea's offshore fields, agreed to pay his $3400 tuition and his living expenses. Teodorin rejected the dormitory and instead "shuttled between two off-campus residences: a rental home in Malibu and a suite at the Beverly Wilshire hotel. He rarely attended class, instead spending much of his time shopping in Beverly Hills. Teodorin dropped out of the program after five months; Walter International's tab came to about $50,000."

From 2004 to 2008, U.S. lawyers, bankers, and real estate and escrow agents helped Teodorin move over $110 million through U.S. bank accounts.

From 1998 to 2006, he owned a mansion on a 16-acre estate at 3620 Sweetwater Mesa Road, in the private gated community of Serra Retreat in Malibu. He owned the house through his company, Sweetwater Mesa LLC, which in April 2006 sold this property to another of his shell firms, Sweetwater Malibu LLC. (He also owns a firm called Sweetwater Management Inc.) The $35 million purchase price made it the sixth costliest home purchase in the U.S. in 2006. It was also the most expensive home purchase in California in 2006. The estate includes two guardhouses. "A long, tree-lined driveway runs from the estate's main gate past a motor court with fountains and down to a 15,000-square-foot mansion with eight bathrooms and an equal number of fireplaces", reported Foreign Policy in 2011. "The grounds overlook the Pacific Ocean, complete with swimming pool, tennis court, four-hole golf course, and Hollywood stars Mel Gibson, Britney Spears, and Kelsey Grammer for neighbors." Over the years, a dozen former employees at his Malibu estate sued him for unpaid salaries, overtime, and expenses. They described a lifestyle consisting of "drug 'binges' ... escort service girls, Playboy bunnies, and even a tiger." One ex-employee said, "I never witnessed him perform anything that looked like work. ... His days consisted entirely of sleeping, shopping and partying."

Teodorin's female companions in southern California have included a porn actress, a former Playboy Playmate of the Month, and a Grammy-winning rapper and actress named Eve, whom he appointed as president, treasurer, and CFO of one of his shell companies, Sweet Pink. He also secured female party guests from escort agencies. In 2005, he paid $700,000 to rent a yacht from Microsoft's Paul Allen for a party. In 2009, he spent a month on Maui, flying there on his Gulfstream V, chartering another jet for employees, and also bringing along escort girls, sports cars, and a speedboat.

At one point, he routinely carried up to $1 million in cash into the U.S., and always had a bag stuffed with fresh $100 bills. He has stayed in the $5,000-a-night presidential suite at the Four Seasons in Las Vegas and has also spent time in Miami and Palm Beach, in addition to such places outside the U.S. as Bermuda, Nice, and Paris.

Teodorin owned and ran TNO Records and TNO Entertainment, which produced two techno records in 2003. He also released a rap song, "No Better Than This", by Won-G Bruny.

A 2009 article in The New York Times reported that, as of that time, Teodorin frequently visited the U.S., traveling on a diplomatic passport.

In addition to the Malibu home, Teodorin also paid $6.5 million in 2001 for a house in the Bel Air section of Los Angeles, but never moved in. The house was on Antelo Road, across the street from the residence of the actress Farrah Fawcett.

He tried to buy a luxury apartment on Fifth Avenue in Manhattan but was barred by the homeowner's association.

Senate investigators found he spent $59,850 on rugs, $58,000 on a home theater, and $1,734.17 on a pair of wine glasses.

At one point, he owned 32 motorcycles and automobiles in California, including "seven Ferraris, five Bentleys, four Rolls Royces, two Lamborghinis, two Maybachs, two Mercedes, two Porsches, one Aston-Martin, and one Bugatti, with a collective insured value of $9.5 million." Since there were "far too many cars to keep at the estate", he rented garage space at the Petersen Automotive Museum on Wilshire Boulevard. As of 2012, according to Time magazine, his fleet of cars included a half-million-dollar 2011 Ferrari.

Teodorin also owns an expensive collection of Michael Jackson memorabilia. At one point, he went on "a $3.2 million spree on Jackson items. He paid $275,000 for one of the singer's white crystal-covered gloves and $80,000 for a pair of his crystal-covered socks. He also spent $245,000 on a basketball signed by Jackson and the basketball player Michael Jordan." One report identifies the "white, crystal-encrusted glove" as having been worn on Jackson's Bad World Tour. Teodorin also owned the red leather jacket Jackson wore in his "Thriller" video.

In 2005, Teodorin tried unsuccessfully to have a U.S. oil firm, Ocean Energy, buy him a $40 million Gulfstream jet. The next year, he spent $30 million up front for a Gulfstream G-V private jet. He bought the jet through a British Virgin Islands-registered shell company called Ebony Shine International, Ltd. Once he sent it from Rio to Los Angeles to fetch his barber. "In one six-week period in 2006", reported The New York Times in 2009, Teodorin had "transferred $33,799,799.99 to the United States ... which was used to buy" the jet. As of October 2012, his private jet was "believed to be in Equatorial Guinea, but US officials said they would try to seize it if it ever lands in another country."

In a single month, he spent "$80,000 at Gucci and $50,000 at Dolce & Gabbana" for designer clothing. Dolce & Gabbana would periodically send a sales associate and tailor to his estate with racks of merchandise for him to browse and "would close off its second-floor showroom when his girlfriends came in to shop." One girlfriend "racked up about $80,000 in purchases, including bronze and red dresses that cost nearly $7,000 apiece."

In June 2005, he bought two 50-foot speedboats worth $2 million and shipped one to Hawaii so he could use it there. In 2008, "he commissioned a German company ... to design a 'mega yacht' worth $380 million, nearly three times what Equatorial Guinea spends on health and education in a year. After the plan became public, Equatorial Guinea announced it would not be buying it."

==== Activities in France ====
In late 2010, Teodorin shipped his collection of sports cars and $400,000 worth of motorcycles from Los Angeles to France.

For a time, he lived at a Paris hotel off the Champs-Élysées; one day in Paris, he bought over 30 suits. As of 2012, he owned "a five-story mansion on Paris' swank Avenue Foch", where he had "kept 11 luxury cars, including a Maserati and an Aston Martin, until French police seized them" in late 2011 or early 2012. His neighbors on Avenue Foch described "how a parade of tailors from France's top fashion houses regularly arrived at the house while Teodorin was there."

==== Activities in South Africa ====
In 2004, he purchased two homes in Cape Town worth a total of $7 million and also spent about $1.45 million on three cars. George Ehlers, owner of a South African construction firm who said the government of Equatorial Guinea owed him nearly $7.8 million, tried to recoup the debt by gaining ownership of the two mansions as collateral. In 2006, he secured an attachment order from the Cape Town High Court. In a court affidavit, however, Teodorin claimed that the houses belonged to him and not to his government, and explained that he could afford them because "Cabinet Ministers and public servants in Equatorial Guinea are by law allowed to owe [sic] companies that, in consortium with a foreign company, can bid for government contracts and should the company be successful, then what percentage of the total cost of the contract the company gets, will depend on the terms negotiated between the parties."

==== Activities in Equatorial Guinea ====
The French engineering firm Bouygues built Teodorin a free mansion in Malabo, the capital of Equatorial Guinea. He also ordered foreign firms to install zinc-tile roofs on thousands of poor Equatorialguinean homes at a time when he had a "substantial financial interest" in the zinc-roofing industry.

==== Other activities by Teodorin ====
Reportedly, Teodorin also purchased a home in Buenos Aires.

=== Other family members ===
Obiang's three other wives also have government positions. Maria Verminia Buckanan García is a technical adviser to the Ministry of Education. Shaw has a position in technical administration, and Elema is in the agricultural ministry.

Other members of the family who hold high government positions are Obiang's brother Antonio Mba Nguema, who became defense minister in April 2015, and his nephew Baltasar Engonga, who is head of regional integration.

== Effects ==
Equatorial Guinea is considered wealthy by African standards, with a GDP that routinely outperforms neighboring African nations, in most instances by over 300 percent, and that has grown steadily in recent years. Indeed, its per capita GDP now exceeds that of Brazil or Bosnia and Herzegovina. But thanks to the massive diversion of funds from the national treasury into the Nguema/Mongomo group's bank accounts, the people of Equatorial Guinea live in desperate poverty, with over 60% earning less than $1 a day. Life expectancy is below 50, 57% of the people lack clean drinking water, 47% lack safe plumbing, and the level of medical care is primitive. The country has the world's fourth-highest infant mortality rate. Many of these kinds of indicators have gone from bad to worse in recent years. A 2009 UNDP report found that the difference between Equatorial Guinea's per capita GDP rank and its HDI (Human Development Index) rank was the world's highest, implying that Equatorial Guinea is the worst-governed country on the planet.

== Anti-corruption efforts ==
According to Transparency International, the control of corruption in Equatorial Guinea is among the lowest 1% in the world, with citizens of the country believing that many public authorities perform for personal gain. The rule of law of the country was ranked in the lowest 9% among nations by Transparency International as well.

=== EG Justice ===
There is no human-rights organization or anti-corruption group in Equatorial Guinea. The human-rights group EG Justice, which focuses on such issues in the country, is based abroad. Its executive director, Tutu Alicante, has lived in U.S. exile since age 19 and describes his country as having two realities. "It has the highest GDP per capita but also the widest gap between rich and poor people." Despite being "on paper the richest country on the continent on a per capita basis, on a par with many European nations", he told The Guardian in 2014, Equatorial Guinea has "one of the highest income and standard of living disparities. ... The income per capita is one that should allow people to have the same access to healthcare, etc., as most European nations. Then you look at the rates of access to water, access to adequate healthcare, access to education, infant mortality, maternal mortality, and you see that we are basically where the DRC is, where Haiti is. The gap between the income and the access to basic needs and rights is astronomical." The reason for the absence of human-rights or anti-corruption groups, he has explained, is that the country is small, and any institution, such as a church, "that the government perceives as sufficiently powerful is immediately co-opted" or "completely undermined". Also, there are no labor unions, and any meeting of over five people requires a government permit.

When the African Football Confederation (CAF) awarded Equatorial Guinea the rights to host the 2015 Africa Cup of Nations tournament (AFCON), Alicante protested. "At a moment when Equatorial Guinea desperately needs to move from dictatorship to democracy and at a moment when we in Equatorial Guinea and beyond should be concerned with political and economic reforms that would transform the riches of our nations into sustainable economic development for all, it is unfortunate to see the CAF and other institutions acting in complicity with the government of Equatorial Guinea to entrench corruption and bad governance", he said.

=== U.S. investigations ===
Although U.S. law prohibits foreign officials found to be involved in corruption and their families from receiving visas, U.S. State Department officials told The New York Times in 2009 that Equatorial Guinea's close relationship with the American oil industry led to lax enforcement of the law in Teodorin's case. John Bennett, former U.S. ambassador to Equatorial Guinea, stated that U.S. authorities had "turned a blind eye" to Obiang's corruption and repression because of the country's dependence on the U.S. for natural resources." Speaking in Congress on September 26, 2006, Senator Carl Levin blamed the failure of the U.S. to act thus far against flagrant official corruption in Equatorial Guinea on the U.S. oil industry's ties to that country's leaders.

The U.S. Justice Department (DOJ) and Senate Permanent Committee on Investigations started to examine the finances of the Obiang family in 2004. The Senate committee found that Teodorin Obiang had utilized shell corporations to circumvent anti-money-laundering laws to funnel more than $100 million into United States financial institutions and that Riggs Bank in Washington, D.C., had opened several accounts for Obiang and helped him sequester his wealth in offshore shell corporations. The bank was eventually fined for these actions and for similar dealings on behalf of Chilean dictator Augusto Pinochet. The Senate committee concluded, moreover, that Riggs Bank had ignored evidence suggesting it had handled the proceeds of corrupt foreign practices. After the U.S. fined Riggs Bank for its dealings with Obiang, the bank was allowed to keep his account open, although the funds were transferred shortly thereafter to accounts in Banco Santander and other institutions in the name of Kalumga Company.

In three civil cases, the first of which was filed in 2011, the U.S. Justice Department accused Teodorin, whose official annual salary is about $100,000, of buying a long list of expensive items with money stolen from Equatorial Guinea. A former employee of Teodorin's told investigators that Teodorin had a habit of travelling with Louis Vuitton rolling suitcases stuffed with sometimes $1 million in cash. In an October 2014 settlement, filed in a Los Angeles district court, Teodorin gave the U.S. government less than half of what it wanted, including his Malibu mansion, a Ferrari, and "six life-size Michael Jackson statues". In exchange, he was permitted to keep his jet, a boat, and the rest of his collection of Michael Jackson memorabilia. The agency agreed not to look into Teodorin's "alleged removal of Michael Jackson memorabilia from the U.S. during the civil case."

Officials said the agreement with Teodorin showed that the justice department's Kleptocracy Asset Recovery Initiative, under the auspices of which the probe into Teodorin had taken place, had become a key deterrent to foreign kleptocrats. "These cases do send a strong message that if you bring your assets into our country, if you buy real estate here, we will find them. We will take them", said U.S. Assistant Attorney General Leslie Caldwell, then head of the Justice Department's criminal division. The 2014 settlement did not affect Teodorin's ability to enter the U.S., which he continued to enjoy because of his diplomatic immunity.

The DOJ investigation of the Obiang family also involved work by Immigration and Customs Enforcement (ICE) and by Homeland Security Investigations' (HSI) Foreign Corruption Investigations Group (FCIG) and HSI Asset Identification and Removal Group in Miami. The probes involved work in Rome, Madrid, London, and Paris. The Teodorin action was the first ever initiated by the DOJ against a sitting official of a foreign government.

=== French investigations ===
In 2007, French police uncovered assets in the tens of millions belonging to the Obiang family, including several luxury cars owned by Teodorin worth a combined $6.3 million. In 2010, a French judge ruled that a related corruption case brought by human rights groups against the Obiangs, along with several other ruling African families, could proceed with investigations and hearings. The French government charged Teodorin with money laundering and seized his massive, multi-million-dollar Paris mansion and his fleet of luxury cars.

On July 13, 2012, French authorities issued an arrest warrant for Teodorin, for failing to appear at a French money-laundering investigation to answer questions about his spending millions of dollars despite supposedly earning only a modest government salary. In September 2012, Equatorial Guinea sued France in the International Criminal Court after French police raided a Paris mansion owned by Teodorin and found luxury goods worth millions of Euros. The complaint called on the ICC to prohibit France from interfering in its internal affairs and to order France to stop legal action against its representatives.

=== Spanish investigations ===
In 2008, the Pro Human Rights Association of Spain filed a criminal complaint in that country against the government of Equatorial Guinea for money laundering, citing over $26 million in transfers of funds from Riggs Bank to Banco Santander in Madrid between 2000 and 2003. The complaint listed eleven people, including Obiang, his son Gabriel Nguema Lima, his daughter-in-law Virginia Esther Maye, his brother-in-law Teodoro Biyogo, Elena Mensa, Minister of Foreign Affairs Pastor Mincha, Mincha's wife, Magdalena Ayang, and former Minister of Mines Anastasio Ela. As of 2011, a Spanish court was investigating these charges of money laundering as well as the charge that the money had been used to buy luxury homes and chalets primarily in Madrid and the Canary Islands.

=== Italian investigations ===
Italian officials also stated that an Italian businessman who was in business with Teodorin Obiang had died in a plane crash in Equatorial Guinea that had suspicious circumstances.

== Whitewashing ==
To counteract reporting about corruption in Equatorial Guinea, Obiang retains U.S. lobbyists and PR experts, notably Lanny Davis, former counsel to U.S. President Bill Clinton. As of 2011, Davis was earning $1 million a year from Obiang.

== See also ==
- International Anti-Corruption Academy
- Group of States Against Corruption
- International Anti-Corruption Day
- ISO 37001 Anti-bribery management systems
- United Nations Convention against Corruption
- OECD Anti-Bribery Convention
- Transparency International
