= Gabriel Mbega Obiang Lima =

Equatoguinean politician (born 1972)

Gabriel Mbega
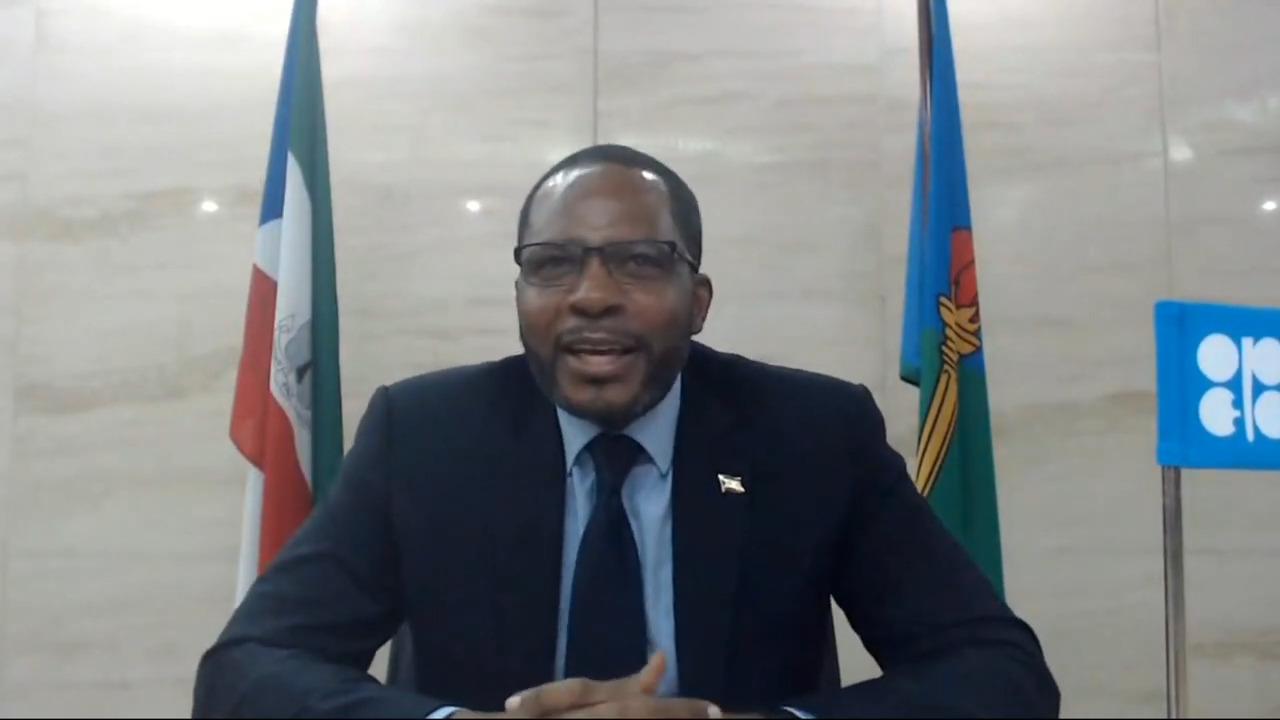
- Mbega in 2020

Minister of Mines and Hydrocarbons
- Incumbent
- Assumed office 2 February 2023
- Preceded by: Valentín Maye Eka

Personal details
- Born: 2 November 1972 (age 53) Mongomo, Equatorial Guinea
- Party: Democratic Party of Equatorial Guinea
- Spouse: Virginia Esther Mayé
- Children: 3
- Parents: Teodoro Obiang Nguema Mbasogo (father); Celestina Lima (mother)
- Relatives: Constancia Mangue (stepmother); Teodoro Nguema (half-brother); Florencio Mayé (father-in-law)
- Occupation: Politician and businessman

Gabriel Mbega Obiang Lima (born 2 November 1972) is an Equatoguinean politician who has served as Minister of Finance, Economy and Planning since February 2023. He previously served as Minister of Mines and Hydrocarbons of Equatorial Guinea from 2012 to 2023.

== Early life ==
Mbega was born on 2 November 1972 in Mongomo, the son of Teodoro Obiang and Obiang's second wife, Celestina Lima, originally from São Tomé and Príncipe. He graduated with a degree in economics from Alma College, in the United States. He is married to the daughter of Florencio Mayé, Virginia Esther Mayé, and has one son and two daughters. He is a linguist with fluency in the English language, French and Spanish.

== Political life ==
Mbega has served in the oil and gas sector since 1997. Between 1998 and 2000, he served as Government Representative in the Equity of the State in the Products Sharing Contracts (PSCs) and further functioned as Presidential Advisor for Hydrocarbons. He also served as Secretary of State for Mines and Hydrocarbons from 1999 to 2009

He later became Vice Minister of Mines, Industry and Energy in 2003. He was appointed the Minister of Mines and Hydrocarbons of Equatorial Guinea on 21 May 2012 and was confirmed in office in June 2016, following a restructuring of the administrative instrument. He has also served as a member of the board of directors of three public energy companies in Equatorial Guinea: SONAGAS, SEGESA and GEPetrol. He continues to serve on the Advisory Board of Africa Oil & Power (AOP). His past positions, experience and initiatives has contributed to advancing the country's oil and gas industry to be one among the five largest in Sub-Saharan Africa. Equatorial Guinea has since 2017, become the 14th Global and 6th African Member State to be part of the Organization of Petroleum Exporting Countries (OPEC).

== Achievements ==
Equatorial Guinea in 2007 rolled out an industrialization plan, National Plan Horizon 2020 for the country aimed at a sustainable economy by 2020. Attempts at its implementation saw a partnership with Energy Allied International, a Houston based firm, to advance the petrochemical sector of the country under the leadership of Mbega, then Minister Delegate of the Ministry of Mines, Industry and Energy, in 2011. The partnership with the firm was projected to create more jobs for citizens. Additionally, Gabriel Obiang Lima supervised the nation's partnership with Royal Vopak, a Dutch storage facilities expert, to build a crude oil storage terminal that will enhance the distribution of crude oil on the island of Bioko. The Ministry of Mines and Hydrocarbons under the leadership of him, has again executed definitive agreements through engagements with major oil and gas industry players, particularly Alen Unit to monetize gas and has launched other successful initiatives including LNG2Africa, the Fortuna FLNG, and the Gas Mega-Hub.

With the aim of indulging the local workforce and local businesses into the operations of the oil and gas sector, as well as improving the capacity of citizens and local businesses, a new local content regulation was enacted in 2014. The regulation was put in place to ensure that all oil and gas agreements have local content clauses and provisions for capacity building and preference is given to local companies in the award of services contracts. In cases where there is no suitable local firm to carry out the project, contractors must offer priority to companies owned by nationals of CEMAC states (African countries), if all else fails. Other important aspects of oil and gas operations were duly outlined in the regulation. As it were, the regulation would help to boost the sector's performance and contribute to the economic growth of the nation as has been experienced in years following its implementation. In the quest to develop the capacity of the workforce to fully grasp the opportunities in the mines, oil and gas industries, Mbega led a delegation to sign an agreement with the Southern Alberta Institute of Technology (SAIT Polytechnic) in 2016 to provide a two-year comprehensive technical training (on both core and technological knowledge in oil and gas) for Equatorial Guinea nationals in Calgary, Alberta, in Canada. This initiative was implemented to ensure that the workforce in the mines and energy sectors are well abreast with latest trends in the field and have the requisite skills needed to boost the activities of the sectors. Owing to the contributions from the energy and oil sector, Equatorial Guinea experienced an improvement in macroeconomic performance which affected public finances. Taxes from that sector increased revenue, with an increment of 7.2% in non-oil revenues in 2018. With the country's oil windfall and the efforts of him as Minister of Mines and Hydrocarbons, Equatorial Guinea cease not to witness a rapid infrastructural development in areas such as roads, airports, electricity production and distribution to other African Countries.

The Ministry of Mines and Hydrocarbons under the leadership of Mbega, has launched several initiatives which are geared towards positioning Equatorial Guinea and the African continent on the international scale to promote local companies and achievements as well as boost foreign capital investments in the mines and hydrocarbons sectors. Some of these initiatives are the Year of Energy 2019 and Year of Investment 2020 with $1 Billion in projects. The latter was envisioned to be characterized by projects such as construction of two modular oil refineries with capacities of 20,000 and 10,000-20000 barrel per day (bpd), construction of a gold refinery, state owned and managed strategic tanks to store oil, gasoline and liquefied petroleum gas, among others. He also played a critical role in the inauguration a pioneering compressed natural gas plant that powers a fleet of public buses, which was projected to be upgraded to provide a wider range of products in 2020 (factored in Year of Investment 2020). Identifying the promising prospects and usage of gas in Equatorial Guinea, the Ministry of Mines and Hydrocarbons did not focus their attention only on minerals and oils but sought to diversify their operations such that gas was explored as well. From the gas, Equatorial Guinea has been able to build the biggest methanol plant in Africa.

The outbreak of COVID-19 has led to critical problems, such as reduction in oil prices, for oil companies and industry stakeholders. As a result, the Ministry of Mines and Hydrocarbon under Mbega's leadership has granted oil and gas companies a two-year extension of their exploration programs. In the same vein, a feasibility study has successfully been carried out on Punta Europa Modular Refinery, a project which was commissioned to V-Fuels Oil and Gas Engineering with the aim of reducing dependence on the importation of refined products, fending off stock breaks and preventing the depletion of the State's foreign exchange reserves. The Ministry again has introduced a new petroleum regulatory framework, a modernized version of the old regulation, which is aimed at maintaining the nation's attractive appeal to foreign investors. The new regulatory framework addresses notable concerns including but not limited to the extension of the productive life of mature fields by structures enabling operators to generate greater value from these assets, the exploration of marginal and onshore fields along with investments in deep and ultra deep water acreages, and the monetization of gas and the growth of the petrochemicals industry. More significantly, this new regulation ensures the integration of the national workforce and local businesses across the value-chain. The new regulation is regarded as a significant component of Equatorial Guinea's recovery strategy for post COVID-19 to aid the country perform even better than she has already been doing.

Again, Equatorial Guinea sealed a contract with a State-owned Russian geological exploration company, Rosgeo to undertake geological mapping project in the country. The project is expected to focus on the Rio Muni area, where there would be scouting works for state geological mapping and complex seismic acquisition. The aim of this project is to analyze landscape conditions for geological surveying, prospecting and technical conditions for the arrangement of geological camp in Rio Muni, determine the scope of mapping drilling and conduct research into the possibility of mineralogical sampling of channel deposits. Upon successful completion of the project, the Rio Muni region of Equatorial Guinea is projected to become a novel natural resources center not just for onshore oil and gas operations but also for mining and minerals as the exploration exercise will provide the grounds for this next stage of growth in the industry. A preliminary team has been deployed by Rosgeo to commence work on the project as of October 2020.

== Honours and awards ==
As the Delegate Minister of Mining, Industry and Energy, Mbega was honoured with an award for Best Contributor to the Development of the African Oil Industry in 2011 at the 18th Africa Oil Week held in Cape Town (South Africa) from 2 to 4 November 2011. In 2017, he, as the Minister of Mines, Industry and Energy of Equatorial Guinea, received the Big Five Energy Award along with other four individuals. The awards were given by NJ Ayuk, the Centurion Law Group CEO at the Africa Oil & Power's Gala Dinner held in Cape Town. He also received an award for Foreign Investment Network (FIN) Outstanding Minister of Hydrocarbon as FIN honoured oil and gas icons at the Petroleum Industry Award 2019.
