= Abaamang =

- Location in Equatorial Guinea
- Coordinates: 1°40′N 10°38′E
- Country: Equatorial Guinea
- Province: Wele-Nzas
- Elevation: 445 m (1,460 ft)

Population
  - Total: 7,729

Abaamang is a town in central Equatorial Guinea. It is located in Wele-Nzas several kilometres north of Nsemensoc.
