= Won-G =

Haitian rapper (born 1973)

- Also known as: The Haiti Boy
- Born: Wondge Bruny; August 29, 1978; Port-au-Prince, Haiti
- Origin: Brooklyn, New York, U.S.
- Genres: Hip hop
- Occupation: Rapper
- Years active: 1995-present

Wondge Bruny (born August 29, 1978), best known by his stage name Won-G, is a Haitian-American rapper.

== Career ==
Won-G was born in Port-au-Prince, Haiti, and raised in Brooklyn, New York. He has released several records, including: Do It, Do It (1995), Royal Impression (2000), No Better Than This (2001), Explosion (2002), Rage of the Age (2004), and Haiti Prince (2008). Won-G has released singles "Rich Together feat Rick Ross" (2015), "Racks" (2015), and "I Can’t Sleep at Night" (2014).

His 2001 single "Nothing Wrong" reached No. 26 on the Billboard Hot 100 Singles Sales chart. "Put It Inside", featuring Da Brat, reached #15 on the Hot Rap Singles chart.

== Discography ==
=== Albums ===
Title	Album details	Peak chart positions	
Title	Album details	US 200	US R&B
Do It Do It	Released: October 17, 1995; Label: Gas Chamber; Format: CD, LP, cassette	—	—
Royal Impression	Released: September 26, 2000; Label: Beyond; Format: CD, LP	—	64
No Better Than This	Released: October 9, 2001; Label: TNO Entertainment; Format: CD, LP	—	—
Explosion	Released: April 9, 2002; Label: Orpheus Records; Format: CD, LP	—	—
Rage of the Age	Released: August 24, 2004; Label: Real Sovage; Format: CD, LP	—	49
Haiti Prince	Released: 2008; Label: AGR Television; Format: CD	—	—
	"—" denotes releases that did not chart or receive certification.		

=== Singles ===
Year	Single	Chart positions		Album
Year	Single	U.S. R&B	U.S. Rap	Album
2000	"We Got What U Want"	—	—	Royal Impression
2001	"Nothing's Wrong" (featuring DJ Quik and James DeBarge)	70	2	No Better Than This
2002	"Put It Inside" (featuring Da Brat)	—	15	Explosion
2004	"Caught Up in the Rapture"	—	—	Rage of the Age
2014	"I Can't Sleep"	—	—	Non-album singles
2014	"Racks"	—	—	Non-album singles
2015	"Rich Together" (featuring Rick Ross)	—	—	Non-album singles
	"—" denotes releases that did not chart or receive certification.			
