= Islam in Equatorial Guinea =

Equatorial Guinea is a Christian majority country, with Islam being a minority religion. Due to the secular nature of the country's constitution, Muslims are free to proselytize and build places of worship in the country.

In the 2021 Aid to the Church in Need religious freedom report it was estimated that 4.1% of the population were Muslims. Previous estimates by the official press agency of Equatorial Guinea in 2015 reported that 3.5% of the population were Muslim and the U.S. State Department International Religious Freedom Report 2006 found that practitioners of Islam comprised less than 1 percent of the population.

Malabo Mosque was opened in 2015 and can accommodate two thousand people. On 2 May 2022, over 500 Muslims gathered on the Malabo promenade to pray and celebrate the end of Ramadan known as Eid al-Fitr after not being able to perform these prayers at the end of the fasting month in 2020 and 2021 due to COVID-19 restrictions. Equatorial Guinea's imam Pedro Benigno Matute Tang said that the main message for 2022 was that Muslims must love one another and educate their children because a "well-educated child, with discipline, cannot adhere to vandalism groups".
