= Antonio Mba Nguema =

Equatoguinean politician (1952–2019)

Antonio Mba Nguema Mikue (17 November 1952 – 5 May 2019) was an Equatoguinean politician. He was a member of the ruling Democratic Party of Equatorial Guinea (PDGE).

== Biography ==
He was born on 17 November 1952 in Mongomo, Wele-Nzas. He was the stepbrother of the current president of Equatorial Guinea, Teodoro Obiang Nguema Mbasogo and started his military career in the 1970s.

In 1992, he became the director of National Security in Obiang's government, working in this position until 2004. Later, he became the Minister of National Defense, a position which he occupied until 2016. He had the highest rank in the country's army as the Captain of the Armed Forces of Equatorial Guinea. In June 2016, he was named as the Secretary of State to the Presidency of the Republic, in charge of Presidential Security—a position he held until his death in 2019.

He died on 5 May 2019, in a South African hospital after severe illness. The government declared a "state of mourning" in response. His funeral took place on 10 May, with various government officials in attendance. He was posthumously awarded the Grand Cross of Independence of Equatorial Guinea. He was subsequently buried in Mongomo.

He married twice and had 17 children.

== Also see ==
- Armengol Ondo Nguema
