= Acoacán =

- Town
- Location in Equatorial Guinea
- Coordinates: 1°37′N 11°19′E
- Country: Equatorial Guinea
- Province: Wele-Nzas

Acoacán is a small town in eastern Equatorial Guinea, located just outside Mongomo, in the province of Wele-Nzas.

It is the birthplace of President Teodoro Obiang Nguema Mbasogo.
