= Armengol Ondo Nguema =

Equatoguinean politician

Armengol Ondo Nguema (born 3 February 1970) is the younger half-brother of Equatoguinean President Teodoro Obiang, as well as the head of the president's Israeli-trained security detail named Sonavi.

He was, until recently, the head of national security. He may have been forced to retire from this position due to his business links to Nick du Toit, who was a leading figure in an abortive coup d'etat in 2004. Nguema shares ownership of Triple Options, a security company with du Toit. The president's son and likely heir, Teodorín Nguema Obiang, reportedly attacked his uncle after discovering the link. Armengol also owns vast properties in Virginia. He is bitterly opposed to the succession of his nephew to the presidency, and presents himself as a stalking horse contender. He has been suspected to be heavily involved in the many human rights abuses that occur in Equatorial Guinea,
