= Constancia Mangue =

First Lady of Equatorial Guinea

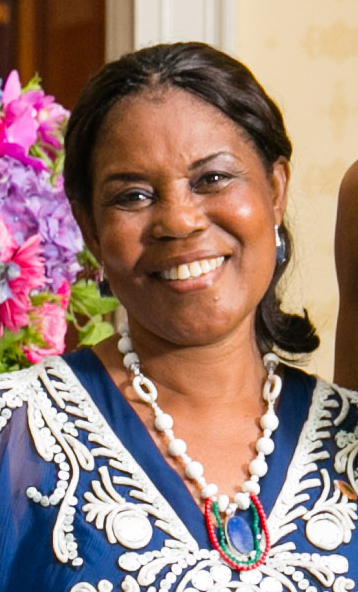
- Mangue in 2014

First Lady of Equatorial Guinea
- Incumbent
- Assumed role 3 August 1979
- President: Teodoro Obiang Nguema Mbasogo

First Lady of African Union
- In office 31 January 2011 – 29 January 2012
- President: Teodoro Obiang Nguema Mbasogo
- Preceded by: Callista Chimombo
- Succeeded by: Chantal Yayi

Personal details
- Born: 20 August 1951 (age 74) Angong-Obuc, Mongomo, Spanish Guinea (now Equatorial Guinea)
- Spouse: Teodoro Obiang Nguema Mbasogo (m. 1968)
- Children: 3 (including Teodoro Nguema Obiang Mangue)

Constancia Mangue Nsue Okomo (born 20 August 1951), also known as Constancia Mangue de Obiang, is the First Lady of Equatorial Guinea. She is married to President Teodoro Obiang Nguema Mbasogo and mother of First Vice President Teodoro Nguema Obiang Mangue.
