= Teodoro Obiang Nguema Mbasogo =

President of Equatorial Guinea since 1979

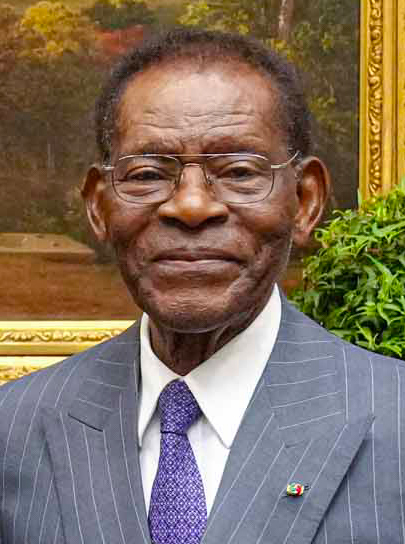
- Obiang in 2026

2nd President of Equatorial Guinea
- Incumbent
- Assumed office 12 October 1982
- Prime Minister: See list: Cristino Seriche Bioko; Silvestre Siale Bileka; Ángel Serafín Seriche Dougan; Cándido Muatetema Rivas; Miguel Abia Biteo Boricó; Ricardo Mangue Obama Nfubea; Ignacio Milam Tang; Vicente Ehate Tomi; Francisco Pascual Obama Asue; Manuela Roka Botey; Manuel Osa Nsue Nsua
- Vice President: See list: First Vice Presidents; Ignacio Milam Tang (2012–2016); Teodoro Nguema Obiang Mangue (2016–present); Second Vice President; Teodoro Nguema Obiang Mangue (2012–2016); Vacant (2016–present)
- Preceded by: Himself (as Chairman of the SMC)

Chairman of the Supreme Military Council (Note: First called the Revolutionary Military Council until 25 August 1979.)
- In office 3 August 1979 – 12 October 1982
- Deputy: See list: First Deputy; Florencio Mayé Elá (1979–1982); Second Deputies; Salvador Elá Nseng (1979–1980); Eulogio Oyó (1980–1981); Cristino Seriche Bioko (1981–1982)
- Preceded by: Council established Francisco Macías Nguema (as President)
- Succeeded by: Council dissolved; Himself (as President)

9th Chairperson of the African Union
- In office 31 January 2011 – 29 January 2012
- Preceded by: Bingu wa Mutharika
- Succeeded by: Thomas Boni Yayi

Personal details
- Born: 5 June 1942 (age 84) Acoacán, Wele-Nzas, Spanish Guinea
- Party: Democratic (since 1987)
- Other political affiliations: United National Workers' Party (before 1979); Independent (1979–1987)
- Spouse: Constancia Mangue (m. 1968)
- Children: Teodoro Nguema; Gabriel Mbaga
- Parent: Santiago Nguema Eneme Obama María Mbasogo Ngui
- Relatives: Francisco Macías Nguema (uncle); Armengol Ondo (brother)
- Education: Colegio Nacional Enrique Nvó Okenve

Military service
- Allegiance: Francoist Spain (until 1968); Equatorial Guinea (after 1968)
- Branch/service: Armed Forces of Equatorial Guinea
- Years of service: 1968–1982
- Rank: Major general
- Commands: Chief of General Staff

Teodoro Obiang Nguema Mbasogo (Note: Spanish pronunciation: [obiãŋ ᵑgema ᵐbazua]) (born 5 June 1942) is an Equatoguinean politician, former military officer, and dictator who has led Equatorial Guinea since 1979, including as its second president since 1982. As of 2026, he is the second-longest-consecutively-serving current non-royal national leader in the world, second to Paul Biya of Cameroon.

After graduating from military school in Zaragoza, Spain, Obiang held multiple positions under the presidency of his uncle, Francisco Macías Nguema, including director of the Black Beach prison notorious for its human rights violations. He ousted Macías in a military coup in 1979 and took control of the country as president and chairman of the Supreme Military Council. The country nominally returned to civilian rule in 1982, and in 1987 Obiang founded the Democratic Party of Equatorial Guinea (PDGE), which was the country's sole legal party until 1992. He has overseen Equatorial Guinea's emergence as an important oil producer, beginning in the 1990s. Obiang was Chairperson of the African Union from 2011 to 2012.

Obiang is widely regarded as an autocratic leader who leads a regime of widespread corruption, abuse of power, human rights violations, and nepotism. Under his rule, Equatorial Guinea continues to have one of the worst human rights records in the world. Equatorial Guinea is a dominant-party state, in which Obiang's PDGE holds virtually all governing power and has held all or almost all seats in the legislature since its creation. The constitution gives Obiang sweeping powers, including the right to rule by decree, effectively making his government a corrupt dictatorship and banana republic. He has also placed family members in key government positions.

== Early life ==
From a family of the Esangui ethnic clan, Obiang was born on 5 June 1942 in the town of Akoacám (Mongomo district, Wele-Nzas province), belonging to the continental region of the colony of Spanish Guinea on the present-day border with Gabon. Obiang was the third of ten sons born to the Gabonese Santiago Nguema Eneme Obama, among whom are also the National Security Delegate Armengol Ondo Nguema and former National Defense Minister Antonio Mba Nguema. Obiang's parents emigrated from Gabon to avoid paying capitation taxes and take advantage of Spanish Guinea's good economic situation. After María Mbasogo Ngui died, Obiang and his brothers were raised by his father and his new wife, Carmen Mikue Mbira.

Obiang completed his first studies at the Cardenal Cisneros School Group in Ebibeyin and the La Salle Center in Bata (now the Enrique Nvo Okenve National College), where he obtained a degree in labor administration.

== Presidency ==
=== Coup and aftermath ===
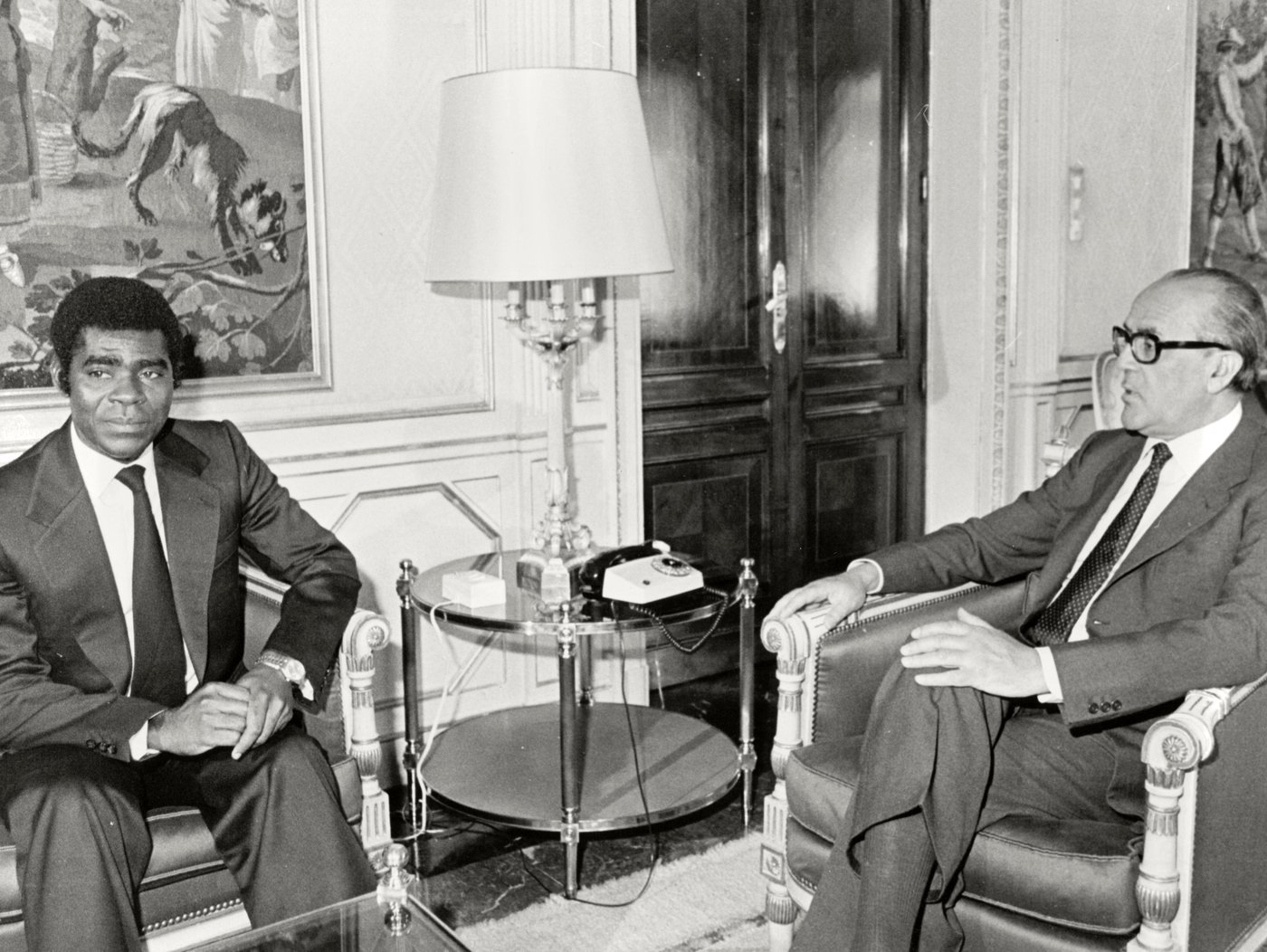
Obiang and Spanish prime minister Leopoldo Calvo-Sotelo in 1982

After Macías ordered the murders of several members of the family they shared, including Obiang's brother, Obiang and others in Macías's inner circle feared he had gone insane. Obiang overthrew Macías on 3 August 1979 in a bloody coup d'état and put him on trial for his actions, including the genocide of the Bubi people, over the previous decade. Macías was sentenced to death and executed by firing squad on 29 September 1979. A new Moroccan presidential guard was required to form the firing squad, because local soldiers feared his alleged magical powers.

Obiang declared that the new government would make a fresh start from Macías's brutal and repressive régime. He granted amnesty to political prisoners, and ended the previous régime's system of forced labor. He also reversed the previous régime's most repressive measures, reversing its bans on glasses and Christianity. But he made virtually no mention of his own role in the Macías régime's atrocities.

=== New constitution ===
The country nominally returned to civilian rule in 1982, with the enactment of a slightly less authoritarian constitution. At the same time, Obiang was elected unopposed to a seven-year term as president. He was sworn in on 12 October, the 14th anniversary of the country's independence from Spain. He was reelected in 1989, again unopposed. After other parties were nominally allowed to organize in 1992, he was reelected in 1996 and 2002 with 98% of the vote in elections international observers condemned as fraudulent. In 2002, at least one voting district was recorded as giving Obiang 103% of the vote.

Obiang was elected to a fourth term in 2009 with 97% of the vote, again amid accusations of voter fraud and intimidation, beating opposition leader Plácido Micó Abogo.

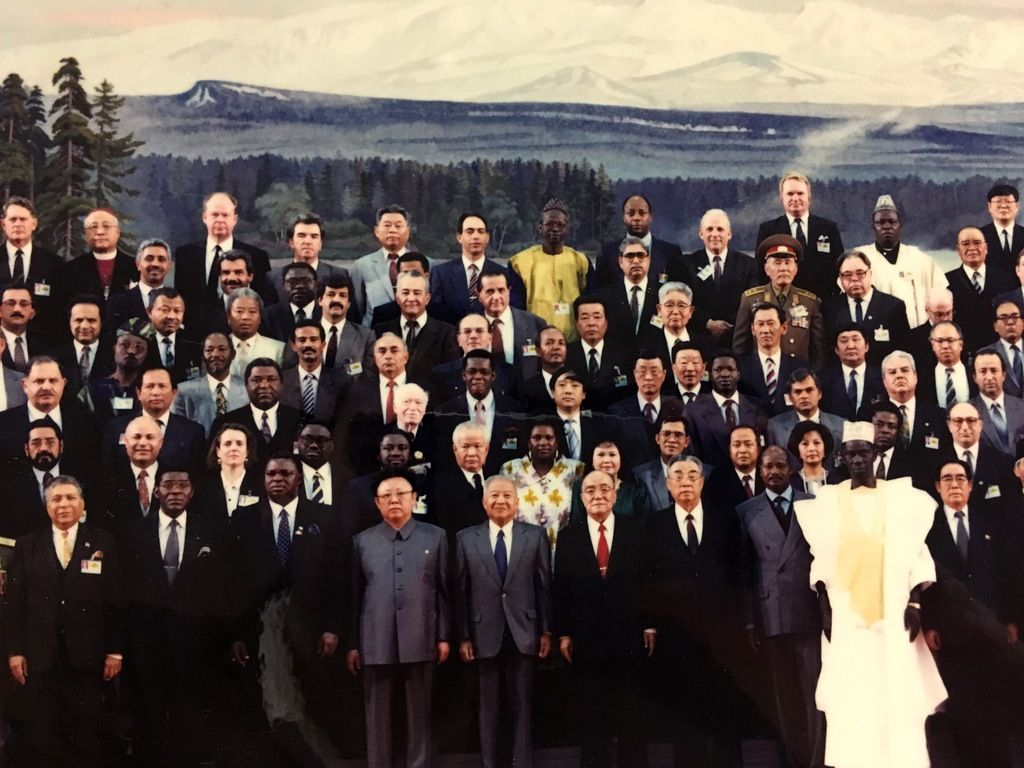
Obiang (1st row, 2nd from left) at Kim Il Sung's 80th birthday anniversary in April 1992

According to most domestic and international observers, Obiang leads one of the world's most corrupt, ethnocentric, and repressive regimes. Equatorial Guinea is essentially a one-party state dominated by Obiang's Democratic Party of Equatorial Guinea (PDGE). The constitution grants Obiang sweeping powers, including the power to rule by decree.

Although opposition parties were de jure legalized in 1992, the legislature is dominated by the PDGE and there is no substantive opposition to executive decisions. There have never been more than eight opposition deputies in the lower house, while the PDGE has held every seat in the Senate since its inception in 2013.

A 2006 article in Der Spiegel quoted Obiang as asking, "What right does the opposition have to criticize the actions of a government?" Free press is severely restricted in the country. There are few private newspapers and almost all mass media is either state-owned or owned by Obiang's son, Teodoro Nguema Obiang Mangue.

=== Foreign relations ===
In 2013, Obiang attended the funerals of Venezuelan president Hugo Chávez and South African president Nelson Mandela. In 2014, he was the only foreign head of state at the funeral of former Spanish prime minister Adolfo Suárez.

==== United States ====
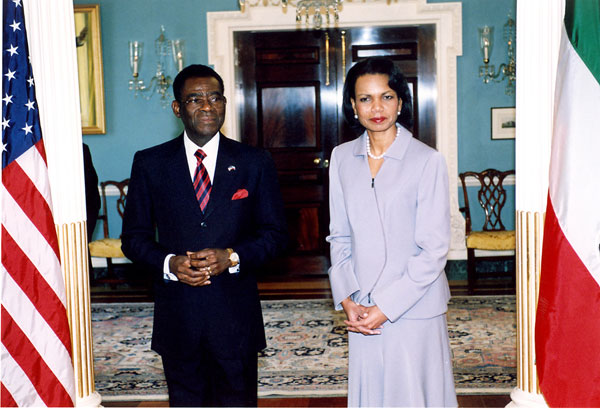
Condoleezza Rice with Obiang in 2006

Equatorial Guinea's relations with the United States cooled in 1993, after US Ambassador John E. Bennett was accused of practicing witchcraft at the graves of 10 British airmen who were killed when their plane crashed there during World War II. Bennett left after receiving a death threat at the U.S. Embassy in Malabo in 1994. In his farewell address, he publicly named the government's most notorious torturers, including Equatorial Guinea's Minister of National Security, Manuel Nguema Mba, another Obiang uncle. No new envoy was appointed, and the embassy closed in 1996, leaving its affairs to be handled by the embassy in Cameroon.

Things turned around for the Obiang regime after the September 11 attacks, after which the United States re-prioritized its dealings with African states. The Institute for Advanced Strategic and Political Studies, a neoconservative Israeli-based think tank, sponsored a forum on 15 May 2006, at which Assistant Secretary of State for Africa Walter H. Kansteiner said, "African oil is of national strategic interest to us, and it will increase and become more important as we move forward."

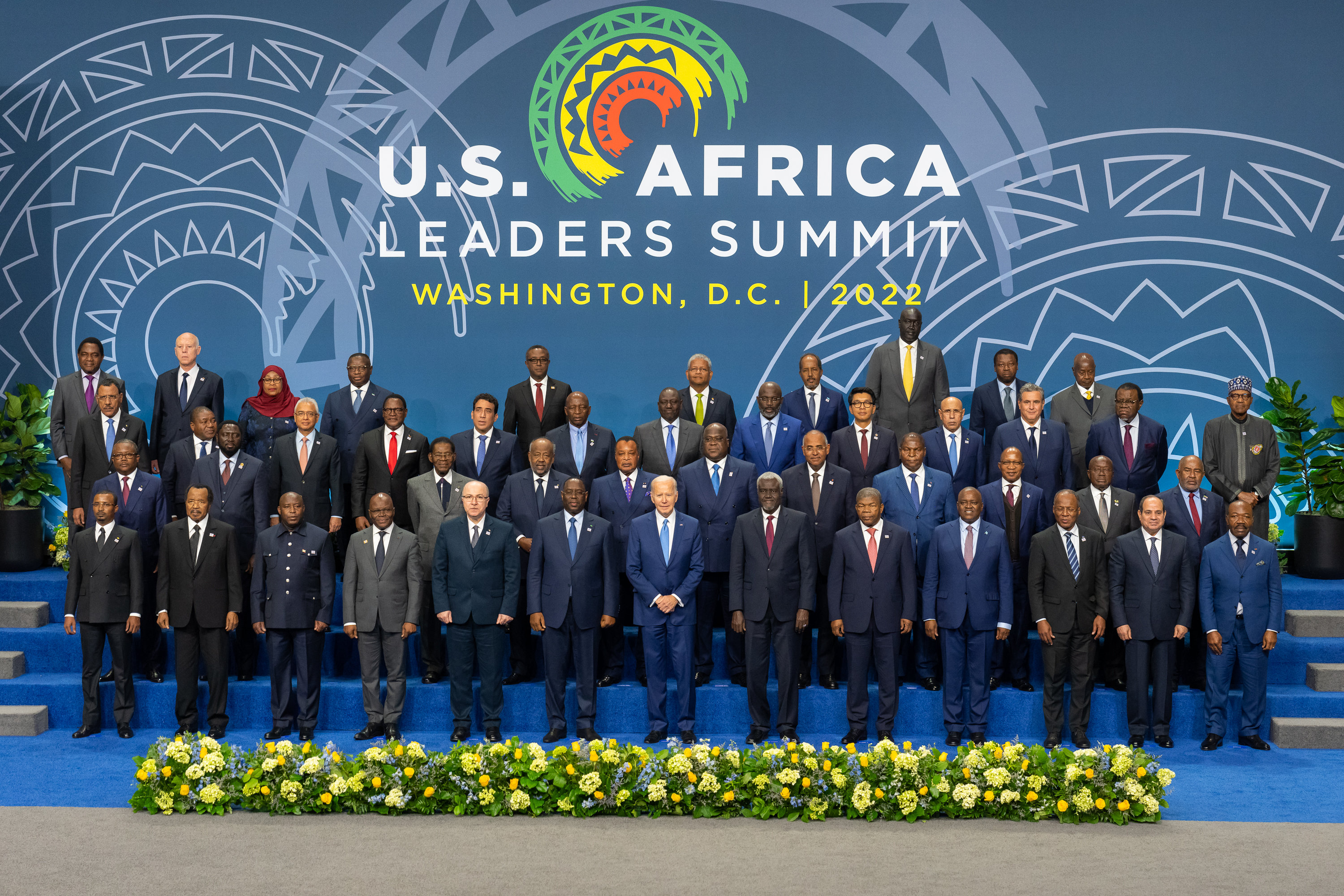
Obiang with other African leaders and US President Joe Biden at the United States–Africa Leaders Summit in December 2022

In a lengthy state visit from March to April 2006, Obiang sought to reopen the closed embassy in the US, saying that "the lack of a U.S. diplomatic presence is definitely holding back economic growth." Obiang was warmly greeted by Secretary of State Condoleezza Rice, who called him a "good friend".

Public relations company Cassidy & Associates may have been partially responsible for the change in tone between Obiang and the US government. From 2004 to 2010, Obiang's government employed Cassidy at a rate of at least $120,000 a month.

But by October 2006, the Senate Foreign Relations Committee had raised concerns about the proposal to build the new embassy on land owned by Obiang, whom the United Nations Commission on Human Rights accused of directly overseeing the torture of opponents. The new embassy chancery opened in 2013.

==== Cameroon ====
Equatorial Guinea has mixed relations with neighbouring Cameroon. There was criticism in Cameroon in 2000 about perceived mistreatment of Cameroonians working in Equatorial Guinea. Cameroon and Equatorial Guinea have an unresolved maritime border dispute. The majority Fang ethnic group of mainland Equatorial Guinea extends both north and south into the forests of Cameroon and Gabon. Cameroon exports some food products to Equatorial Guinea and imports oil from Equatorial Guinea for its refinery at nearby Limbe.

In January 2009, Equatorial Guinean soldiers seized three Cameroonian fishermen were accused by villagers of killing a fourth. In response, Cameroon detained three Equatorial Guinean marines and exchanged them for the detained fishermen.

==== North Korea ====
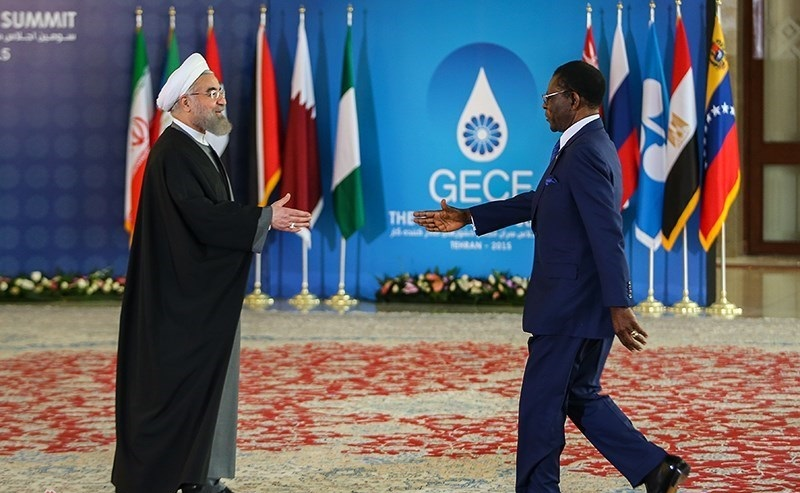
Obiang and Iranian President Hassan Rouhani in 2015

In 2011 Yang Hyong-sop, Vice President of the Presidium of the Supreme People's Assembly, made a four-day visit to Equatorial Guinea. In 2013 President Teodoro Obiang Nguema Mbasogo was presented the first International Kim Jong Il Prize by a North Korean delegation. In 2016, Kim Yong-nam of North Korea visited Equatorial Guinea and held amicable talks with Obiang.

In 2018, Equatorial Guinea reported that it had severed economic ties with North Korea and repatriated North Korean workers in line with United Nations sanctions. However, North Korea reported continued friendly relations.

==== Russia ====
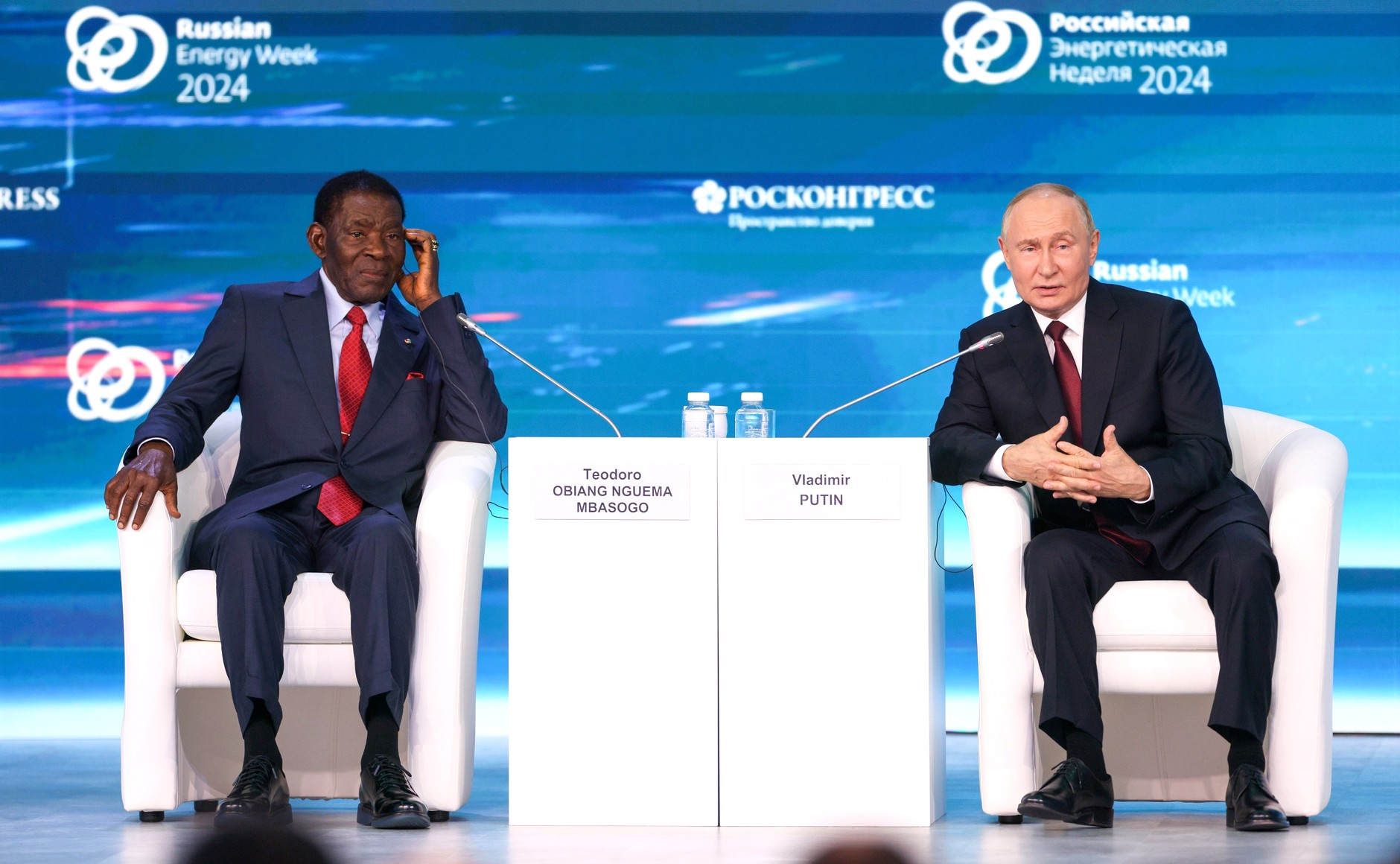
Obiang with Russian President Vladimir Putin in Russian Energy Week 2024

On 26 September 2024, Obiang visited Moscow and had a meeting with Russian President Vladimir Putin at Russian Energy Week 2024. Putin emphasized that Russia and Equatorial Guinea have successfully cooperated in OPEC+.

==== Spain ====
In August 1979, Obiang overthrew his uncle, Francisco Macías Nguema, in a military coup in Equatorial Guinea. Spain did not intervene to defend Macías and was prepared to send troops if Spanish nationals were targeted by Macias.

Between 1979 and 1983, Spain sent Equatorial Guinea 15 million Spanish pesetas for the development of the nation. Relations between both nations almost severed again due to debt renegotiation in 1983 and the fact that Equatorial Guinea owed Spain over 6 million Spanish pesetas.

Tensions resurfaced during the failed 2004 coup attempt against Obiang. The Equatoguinean government accused Spain of having prior knowledge of the plot and of deploying naval vessels to the region. Former Spanish Prime Minister José María Aznar denied the allegations that the ships were there to assist in the coup.

In 2016, trade between Equatorial Guinea and Spain totaled €748 million Euros. 90% of Equatorial Guinea's exports to Spain is in oil. Spain's main exports to Equatorial Guinea include: drinks, furniture and lamps, mechanical equipment, automobiles and trucks, and electronic material. Spain's has €3 million Euros of investment in Equatorial Guinea, mainly in the construction industry. At the same time, Equatorial Guinea's investment in Spain totals €4 million Euros. Equatorial Guinea is Spain's ninth biggest trading partner from Africa (78th largest globally). Spain is Equatorial Guinea's third biggest trading partner globally (after China and the United States).

=== Economy ===
The economy of this small nation continued to struggle under President Obiang, with the country depending mostly on foreign aid in order to subsist. This changed in 1995 when ExxonMobil discovered oil in the country. Massive offshore discoveries over the past decade have boosted oil to about 380,000 barrels per day, ranking Equatorial Guinea behind only Nigeria and Angola among Sub-Saharan African producers.

As expected, income from petroleum led to a boom and the country experienced rapid economic growth. According to UNESCO, the country has one the highest adult literacy rates in sub-Saharan Africa, with an average of 95 per cent. It also has the highest per capita income in Africa. Despite this, more than three-quarters of the population live below the poverty line, according to data from the World bank. This wealth is distributed extremely unevenly and most of it is concentrated in the hands of the ruling family.

President Obiang has a net worth of $600 million, according to Forbes, meaning he is easily one of the world's richest heads of state, while the country's HDI ranks 145th out of 191. The vast majority of the oil revenue of Equatorial Guinea has been siphoned under the guise of funding large infrastructure projects executed by contractors with ties to President Obiang's inner circle. Education and health receive an average of 2–3 percent of the budget, while extraction has already been declining since 2012 and oil reserves are estimated to dry out by 2035.

=== New capital city ===
In 2012, Obiang ordered the construction of a new planned city, Ciudad de la Paz, previously known as Oyala, replacing Malabo as the country's capital city. The location was chosen for its easy access and milder climate and national security purposes, as the 2004 Equatorial Guinea coup attempt raised paranoia about maritime access to the capital. It is notably on the mainland, in contrast to Malabo, which is on the island of Bioko. It was designed by the Portuguese Studio for Architecture and Urbanism FAT – Future Architecture Thinking. It is projected to have around 200,000 inhabitants, a new Parliament building, a number of presidential villas and an area of 81.5 km². Additionally, the Afro-American University of Central Africa is located there. The construction of this new capital has been criticized by the political opposition to Obiang, the driving force behind the initiative. The government of Equatorial Guinea began to move to the city in early 2017.

AICEP Portugal Global funded the construction of the city and plans came from a Portuguese architectural office. The construction work was supported by China, Poland, Brazil and North Korea. Construction faced delays such as, according to unconfirmed reports, Obiang ordering a building to be moved because he did not like the view. Additionally, all materials were imported.

On 2 January 2026, Obiang signed an order declaring Ciudad de la Paz as the formal capital city.

=== Human rights ===
Obiang with Eritrean President Isaias Afwerki in October 2026

In 2006, Obiang signed an anti-torture decree banning all forms of abuse and improper treatment in Equatorial Guinea, and commissioned the renovation and modernization of Black Beach prison in 2007 to ensure the humane treatment of prisoners. However, human rights abuses have continued. Human Rights Watch and Amnesty International among other non-governmental organizations have documented severe human rights abuses in prisons, including torture, beatings, unexplained deaths and illegal detention.

In their most recently published findings (2020), Transparency International awarded Equatorial Guinea a total score of 16 on their Corruption Perceptions Index (CPI). CPI ranks countries by their perceived level of public corruption where zero is very corrupt and 100 is extremely clean. As of 2023, Equatorial Guinea was ranked 120th out of a total of 180 countries. Freedom House, a pro-democracy and human rights NGO, described Obiang as one of the world's "most kleptocratic living autocrats", and complained about the US government welcoming his administration and buying oil from it.

=== Abolition of the death penalty ===
In September 2022, Obiang signed a law which officially abolished the death penalty and declared it an illegal punishment, even though the last execution took place in 2014, eight years earlier. This was seen as a slight improvement in human rights in the country and this move was praised internationally.

=== LGBT+ rights ===
Homosexuality is not illegal in Equatorial Guinea, but the International Lesbian, Gay, Bisexual, Trans and Intersex Association (ILGA) reported that "evidence that State intimidation of sexually diverse individuals persists." Equatorial Guinea's criminal code is a revision of the Spanish Criminal Code that dates to the Francoist era and is said to post-colonially carry homophobic undertones. The age of consent is 18, regardless of gender or sexual orientation.

== Controversy ==
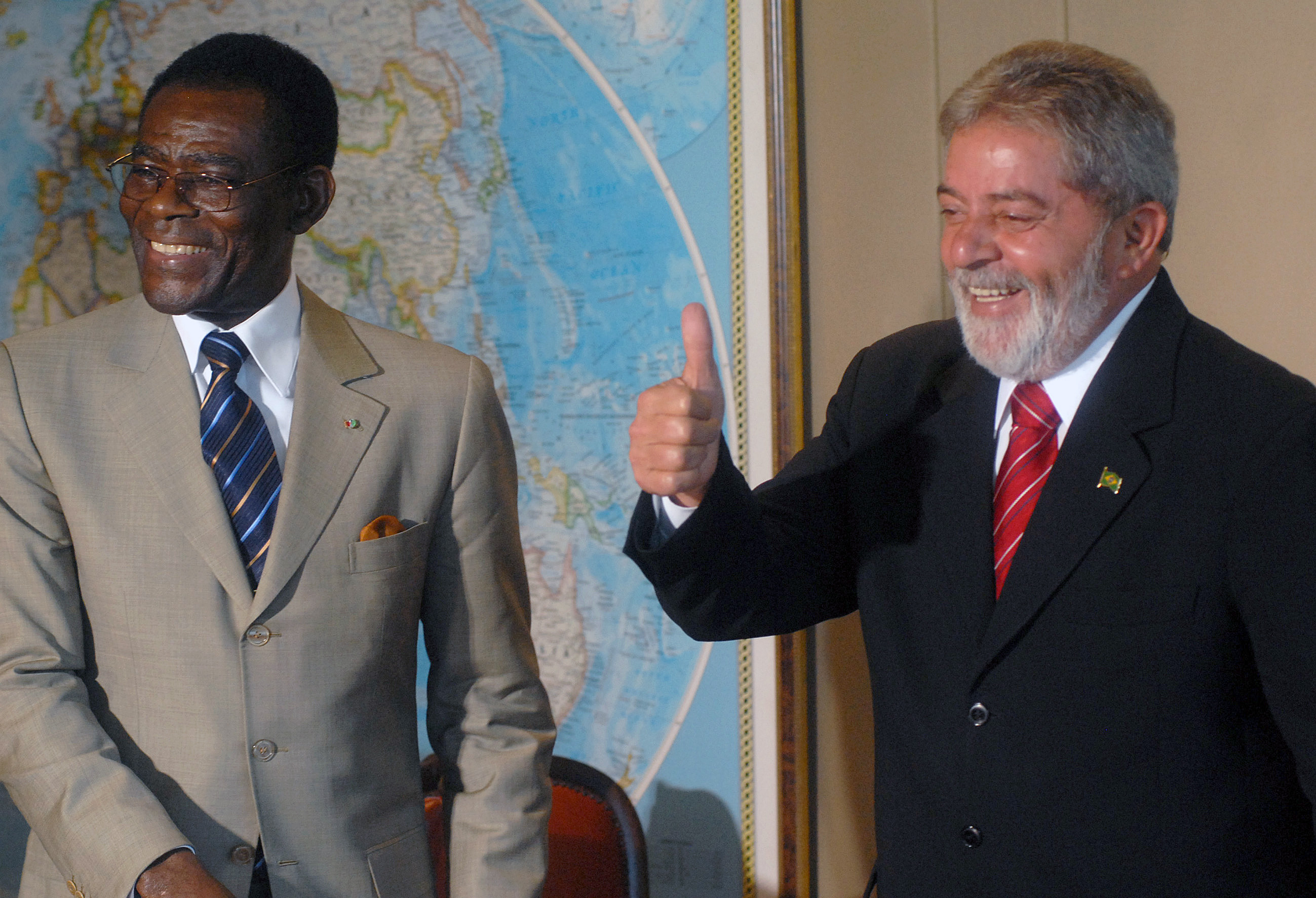
Obiang with Brazilian president Lula da Silva in 2008

In July 2003, state-operated radio declared Obiang "the country's God" with "all power over men and things." It added that the president was "in permanent contact with the Almighty" and "can decide to kill without anyone calling him to account and without going to hell." He personally made similar comments in 1993. His uncle and predecessor Macías had also proclaimed himself a god. Despite these comments however, Obiang still claims that he is a devout Catholic and was invited to the Vatican by Pope John Paul II and again by Pope Benedict XVI.

Obiang has encouraged his cult of personality by ensuring that public speeches end in well-wishing for himself rather than for the nation as a whole. Many important buildings have a presidential lodge, many towns and cities have streets commemorating Obiang's coup against Macías, and many people wear clothes with his face printed on them.

Like his predecessor and other African strongmen such as Idi Amin and Mobutu Sese Seko, Obiang has assigned himself several creative titles. Among them are "gentleman of the great island of Bioko, Annobón and Río Muni." He also refers to himself as El Jefe (the boss).

In 2008, American journalist Peter Maass called Obiang Africa's worst dictator, worse than Robert Mugabe of Zimbabwe. While he was researching a book on the country's oil boom in 2004, Maass recalled that no one approached him on the streets. He believed that the only time he had encountered a more docile populace was in North Korea.

In a 2012 interview on CNN, Christiane Amanpour asked Obiang whether he would step down at the end of his current term (2009–2016) since he had been reelected at least four times in over 30 years. Obiang categorically refused to step down despite term limits in the 2011 constitution.

=== Abuses ===
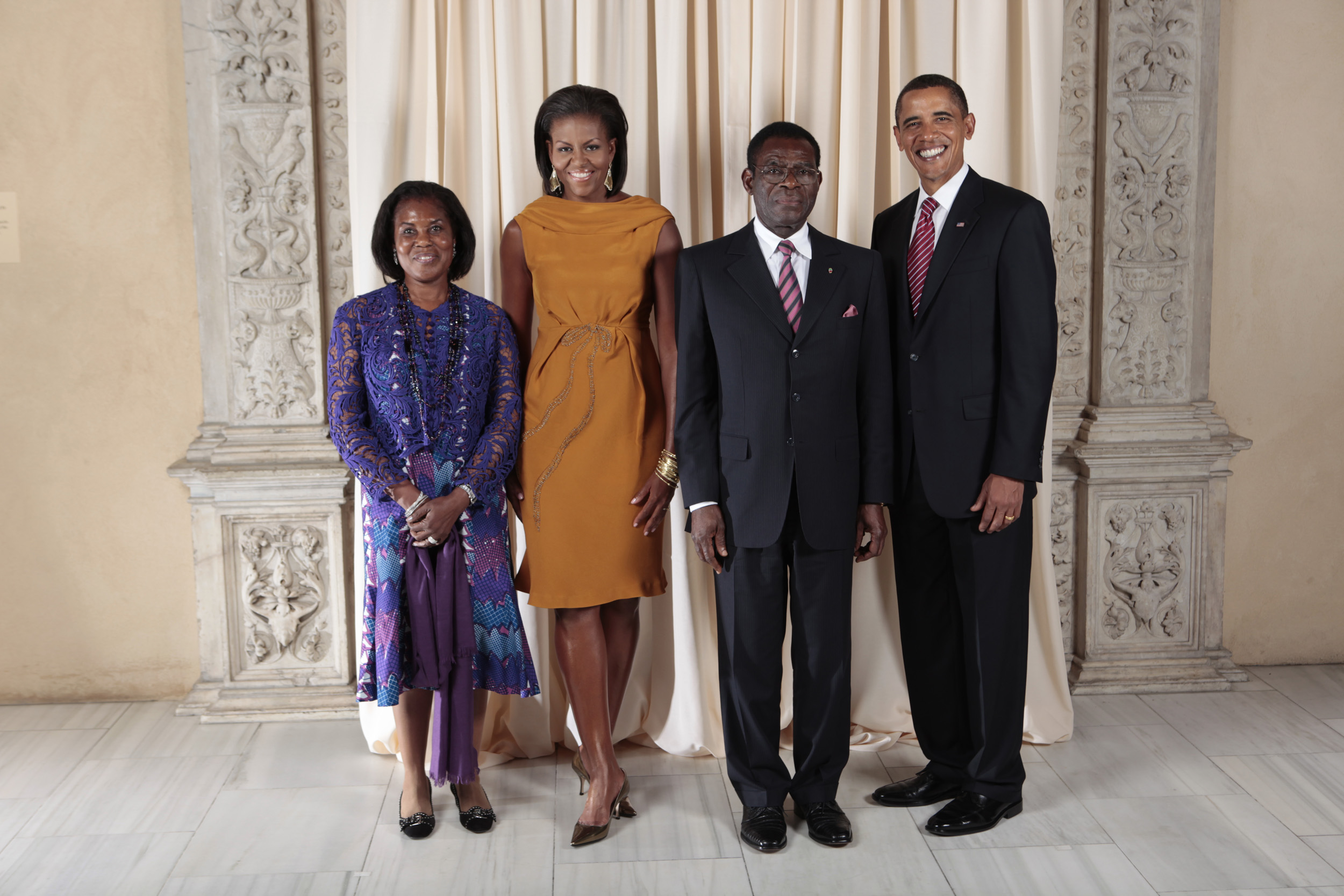
President Barack Obama and First Lady Michelle with Obiang and his wife, First Lady Constancia Mangue in 2009

Abuses under Obiang have included "unlawful killings by security forces; government-sanctioned kidnappings; systematic torture of prisoners and detainees by security forces; life-threatening conditions in prisons and detention facilities; impunity; arbitrary arrest, detention, and incommunicado detention."

The few private media outlets in the country are largely owned by people close to Obiang. Freedoms of association and of assembly are severely curtailed, and the government imposes restrictive conditions on the registration and operation of nongovernmental organizations. The few local activists who work on human rights-related issues often face intimidation, harassment, and reprisals.

=== Wealth ===
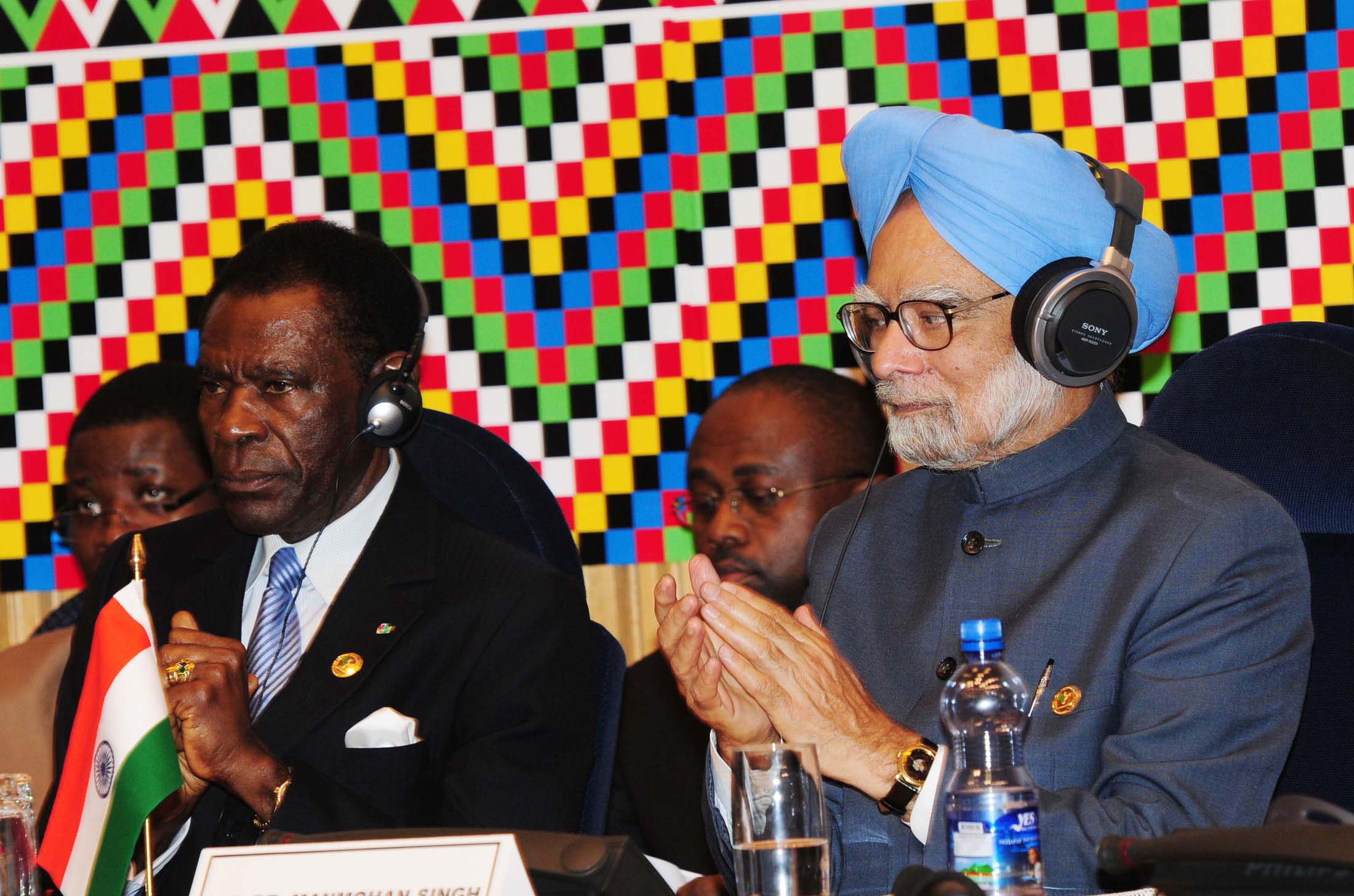
Obiang and Indian prime minister Manmohan Singh in 2011

Forbes has said that Obiang, with a net worth of $600 million, is one of the world's wealthiest heads of state.

In 2003, Obiang told his citizenry that he felt compelled to take full control of the national treasury to prevent civil servants from being tempted to engage in corrupt practices. Obiang then deposited more than $500 million into more than 60 accounts controlled by himself and his family at Riggs Bank in Washington, D.C., leading a U.S. federal court to fine the bank $16 million for allowing him to do so. In 2004, a United States Senate investigation found that Riggs Bank had taken $300 million in payments on behalf of Obiang from ExxonMobil and Hess Corporation.

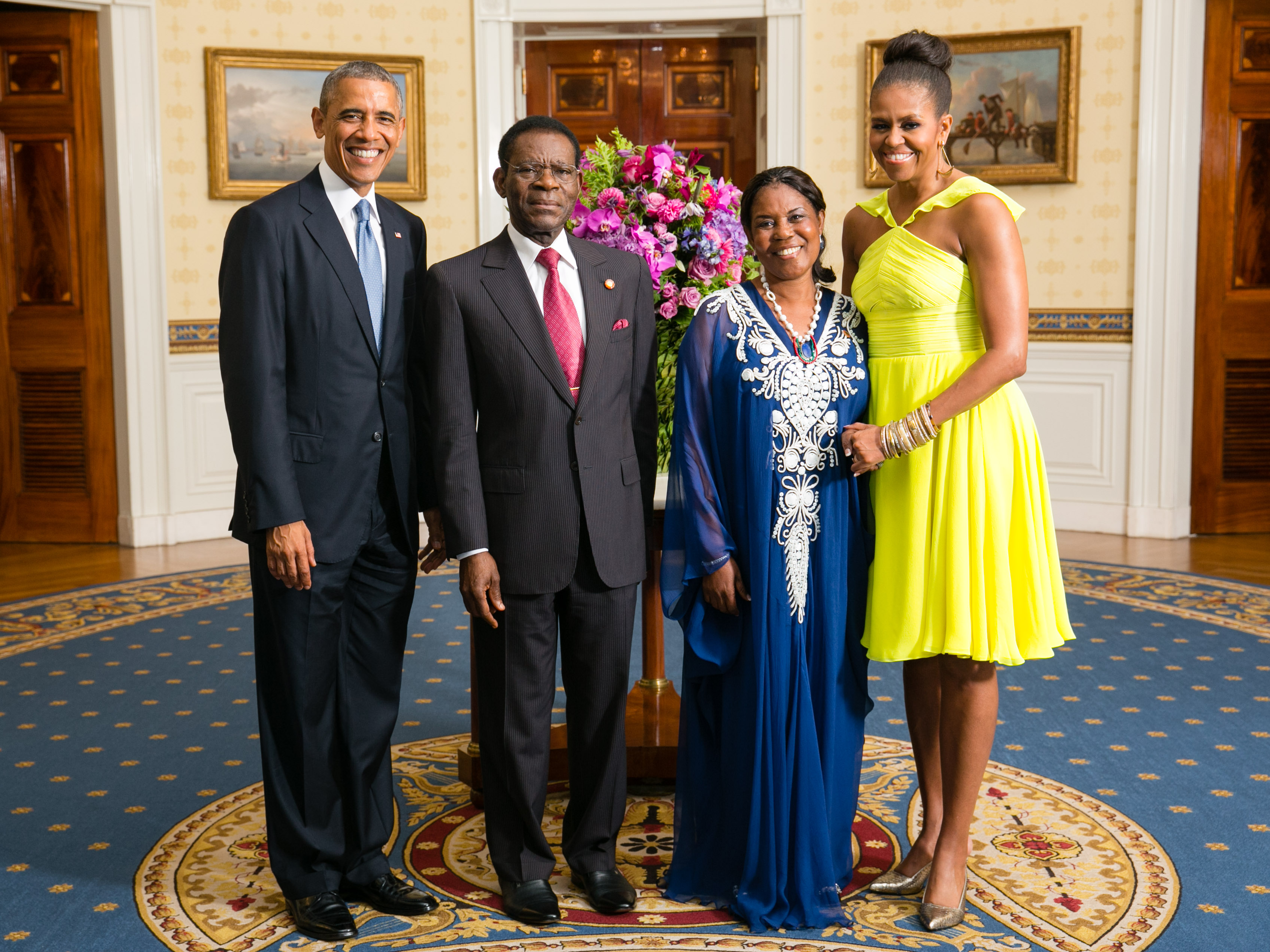
The Obamas welcome Obiang and Constancia Mangue at the White House, 2014

In 2008, the country became a candidate for the Extractive Industries Transparency Initiative—an international project meant to promote openness about government oil revenues—but never qualified and missed the April 2010 deadline. Transparency International includes Equatorial Guinea on its list of the 12 most corrupt states.

Beginning in 2007, Obiang and several other African state leaders came under investigation for corruption and fraudulent use of funds. He was suspected of using public funds to finance private mansions and other luxuries for himself and his family. He and his son, in particular, owned several properties and supercars in France. Several complaints were also filed in US courts against Obiang's son. Attorneys stressed that the funds appropriated by the Obiangs were taken legally under Equatoguinean laws, even though those laws might not meet international standards.

The U.S. Department of Justice alleged that Obiang and his son had appropriated hundreds of millions of dollars through corruption. In 2011 and early 2012, the French and US governments seized many assets from Obiang and his son, including mansions, wine collections, and supercars. The US, France, and Spain have all investigated the Obiang family's use of public funds. The corruption investigation is ongoing.

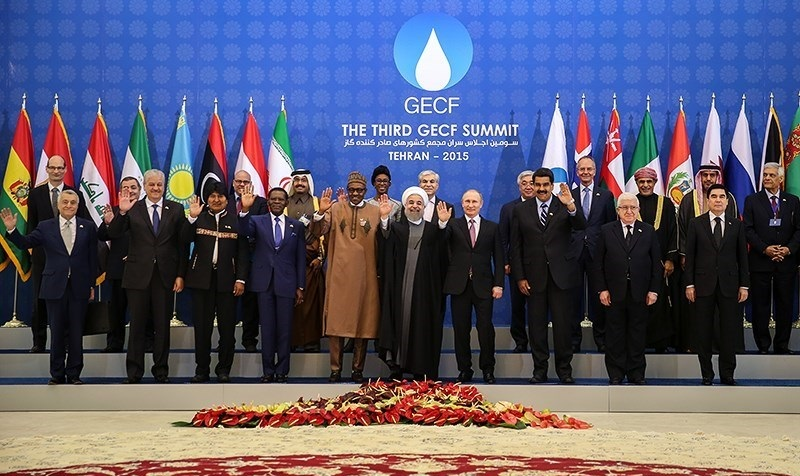
Obiang at the Third GECF summit in Tehran, Iran, 2015

Obiang, his cabinet, and his family have allegedly received billions in undisclosed oil revenue each year from the nation's oil production. Marathon Oil purchased land from Abayak, Obiang's personal investment vehicle, for more than $2 million; in 2004 the sale was pending but Marathon had already made a $611,000 payment with a check made out to Obiang. Marathon also was involved in a joint venture to operate two gas plants with GEOGAM, a quasi-state firm in which Abayak controlled a 75% stake.

Although the cabinet has made moderate increases in social spending, these are far overshadowed by the spending on, for instance, presidential palaces. In addition, the Obiang administration has been characterized by harassment of dissenters and foreign officials seeking to report on conditions.

Obiang filed a libel lawsuit in a French court against an organization he believed was defaming him by saying that his government had committed such acts, but the case was dismissed.

Obiang with Russian President Vladimir Putin at the Russia–Africa Summit in Moscow in 2026

Obiang has made several pledges to commit to open governance, reduce corruption, increase transparency, and improve citizens' quality of life and uphold their basic freedoms. Critics say that Obiang's government has made very little progress toward this goal. Several international groups have called for Obiang to:

- increase fiscal transparency and accountability by publishing all government revenues, and conducting and publishing annual audits of government accounts, including those abroad, and forcing officials to declare assets
- Disclose natural resource revenues
- Greatly increase spending alleviation of poverty
- Uphold political freedoms and rights
- Allow judicial practices to meet international standards
- Cease harassing and hindering his critics
- Allow foreign inspectors and groups to travel freely, unhindered and unharassed.

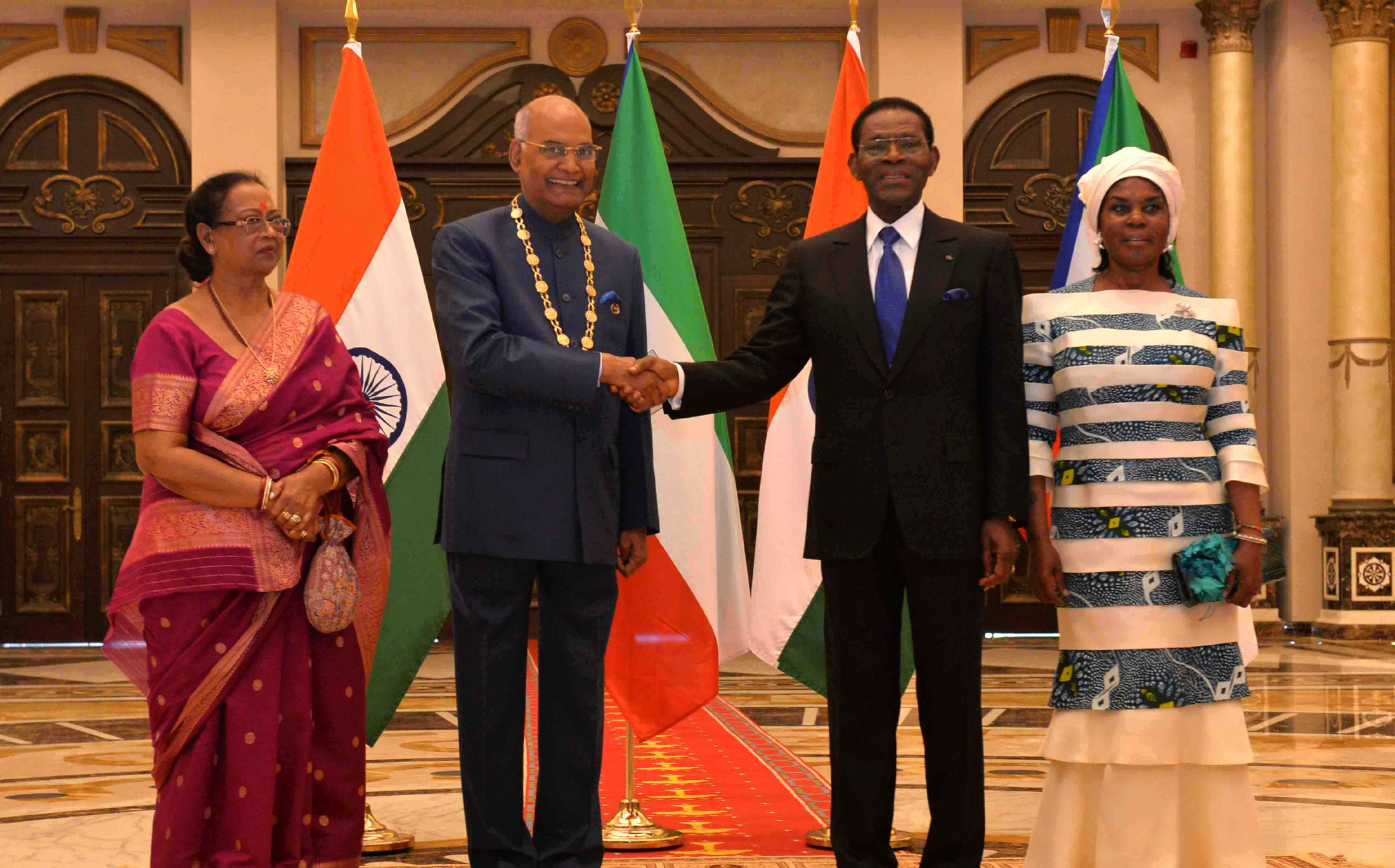
Indian president Ram Nath Kovind at a banquet hosted by Obiang in 2018

The U.S. Justice Department has alleged that Obiang's son also extorted funds from lumber and construction companies by inflating contractor payments by as much as 500%, then funnelled the funds into a private accounts for his own use. Obiang and his cabinet have defended Kiki, as his son is known. Lawyers uphold his innocence in both US and French courts, saying he received the funds legally though legitimate business enterprises.

Shortly after the emergence of these allegations, Obiang named his son Equatorial Guinea's deputy permanent delegate to UNESCO, possibly giving him diplomatic immunity from prosecution. Obiang has created an independent audit task force to review the expenditures and financials of public figures in the government, screen for corruption, and increase financial transparency. The head of this task force, however, was appointed by Obiang himself.

Obiang owns a mansion in the United States, in Potomac, Maryland.

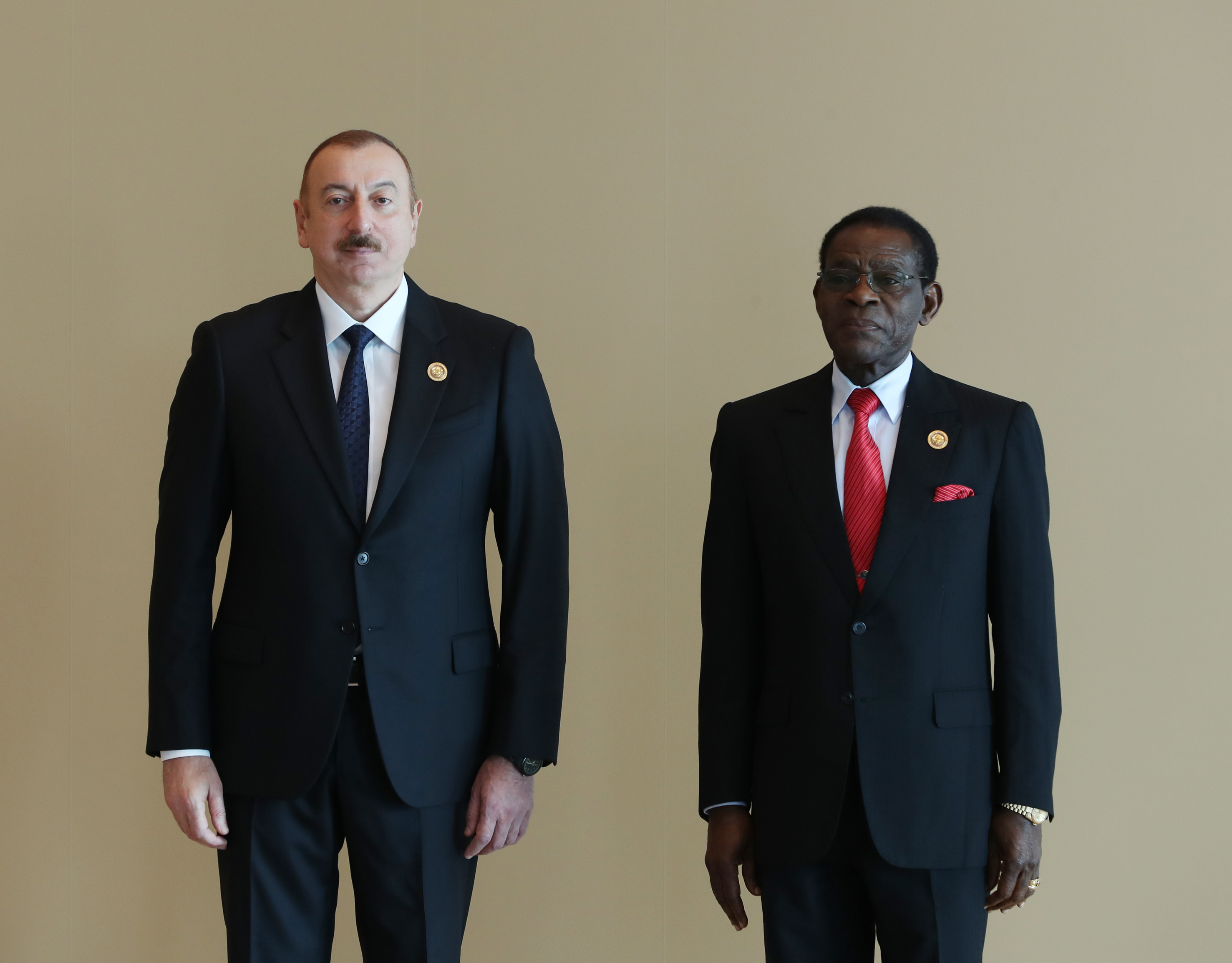
Obiang with the president of Azerbaijan Ilham Aliyev in 2019

Obiang maintained a close relationship with the US-based Riggs Bank. He is said to have been welcomed by top Riggs officials, who held a luncheon in his honor. Publicity regarding this relationship would later contribute to the downfall of Riggs.

On 10 November 2010, the Supreme Court of France ruled that a complaint filed by Transparency International in France on 2 December 2008 was admissible to the court system there. The decision allowed the appointment of an investigating judge and a judicial inquiry into claims that Obiang used state funds to purchase private property in France.

A 2010 article published in Forbes magazine suggested that Obiang gathered roughly $700 million of the country's wealth in US bank accounts.

== Personal life ==
On 12 December 1968, Obiang married Constancia Mangue Nsue Okomo (born 20 August 1951).

In 2006, it was reported that Obiang favoured his son Teodoro Nguema to succeed him.

== Honours ==
- Bolivia:
  - Grand Collar of the Order of the Condor of the Andes (November 2017)
- Eswatini:
  - Collar of the Royal Order of the Crown (2012)
- Philippines:
  - Grand Collar of the Order of Lakandula, Rank of Supremo (May 2006)
- Serbia:
  - Order of the Republic of Serbia, Second Class (February 2022)
- Spain:
  - Collar of the Order of Isabella the Catholic (December 1979)
- Suriname:
  - Grand Officer Honorary Order of the Yellow Star (February 2012)
- Uganda:
  - Most Excellent Order of the Pearl of Africa: Grand Master (2012)

== Notes ==
Political offices
Preceded by Francisco Macías Nguema	President of Equatorial Guinea; 1979–present	Incumbent
Diplomatic posts
Preceded by Bingu wa Mutharika	Chairperson of the African Union; 2011–2012	Succeeded by Yayi Boni
