= Teodoro Nguema Obiang Mangue =

Vice president of Equatorial Guinea since 2016

Teodoro Nguema
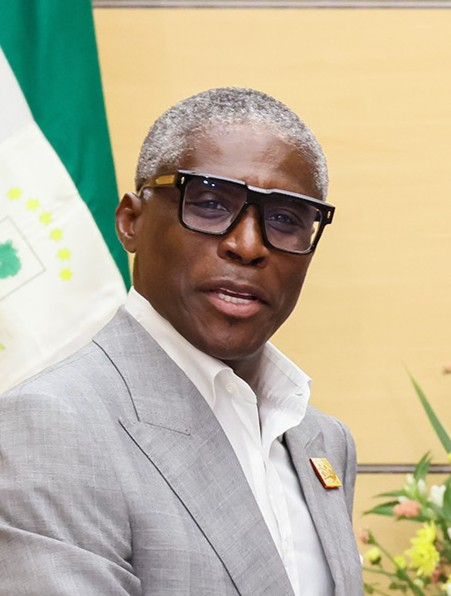
- Nguema in 2025

First Vice President of Equatorial Guinea
- Incumbent
- Assumed office 22 June 2016
- President: Teodoro Obiang Nguema Mbasogo
- Preceded by: Ignacio Milam Tang

Second Vice President of Equatorial Guinea
- In office 21 May 2012 – 22 June 2016
- President: Teodoro Obiang Nguema Mbasogo
- Preceded by: Office established
- Succeeded by: Vacant

Personal details
- Born: 25 June 1968 (age 58) Acoacán, Wele-Nzas, Republic of Equatorial Guinea
- Party: PDGE
- Parent(s): Teodoro Obiang Nguema Mbasogo; Constancia Mangue

Teodoro Nguema Obiang Mangue (born 25 June 1968), nicknamed Teodorín and Teddy, is an Equatoguinean politician and military officer who has served as the First Vice President of Equatorial Guinea since 2016. He is a son of Teodoro Obiang Nguema, the current president of Equatorial Guinea, by his wife, Constancia Mangue. Nguema has been appointed to numerous government positions under his father's regime. He served as Second Vice President of Equatorial Guinea from May 2012 to June 2016, when he was appointed to First Vice President. Between 1997 and 2012, he also served as Minister of Agriculture and Forestry in his father's government. In 2018 he was appointed Major General of the Armed Forces of Equatorial Guinea and is also the founder of the television network Asonga TV. In May 2023, he was described as the de facto leader of Equatorial Guinea.

He was promoted to the position of Ministry of National Defense and Security in 2018, and leads the country's anti-corruption commission set up in May 2022, known as the CNPCC (Comisión Nacional de Prevención y Lucha Contra la Corrupción). As head of the anti-corruption commission, he has overseen purges against perceived opponents of Obiang's regime.

Known for his lavish lifestyle, he has been the subject of a number of international criminal charges and sanctions for alleged embezzlement and corruption. His net worth is an estimated $600 million including his yacht, private jets, and luxury cars. The Nguema family has enriched itself on Equatorial Guinea's substantial oil wealth.

== Education ==
Nguema studied at the École des Roches in Normandy, a French private school. He registered to attend Pepperdine University in Malibu, California, United States, for a four-term non-degree program in English as a second language. He lived lavishly at the Beverly Wilshire Hotel and rarely attended class; he dropped out after only five months, reportedly at the behest of university administrators.

== Political career and international corruption cases ==
Nguema served as Adviser to the Presidency in the 1990s and subsequently as Minister of Agriculture and Forestry, a post he held for about fifteen years.

It was reported in 2005 that Nguema was to be made vice president of Equatorial Guinea, which, according to the constitution, would allow him to accede to the presidency upon his father's retirement. He was eventually elevated to the post of Second Vice-President, in charge of defense and security, on 21 May 2012, alongside former Prime Minister Ignacio Milam Tang, who was designated as First Vice-President. After four years as Second Vice-President, he was promoted to the post of First Vice-President, while remaining in charge of defense and security, on 22 June 2016; this move, which followed his father's re-election in the April 2016 presidential election, placed him clearly in line to succeed his father.

== Spending and controversies ==
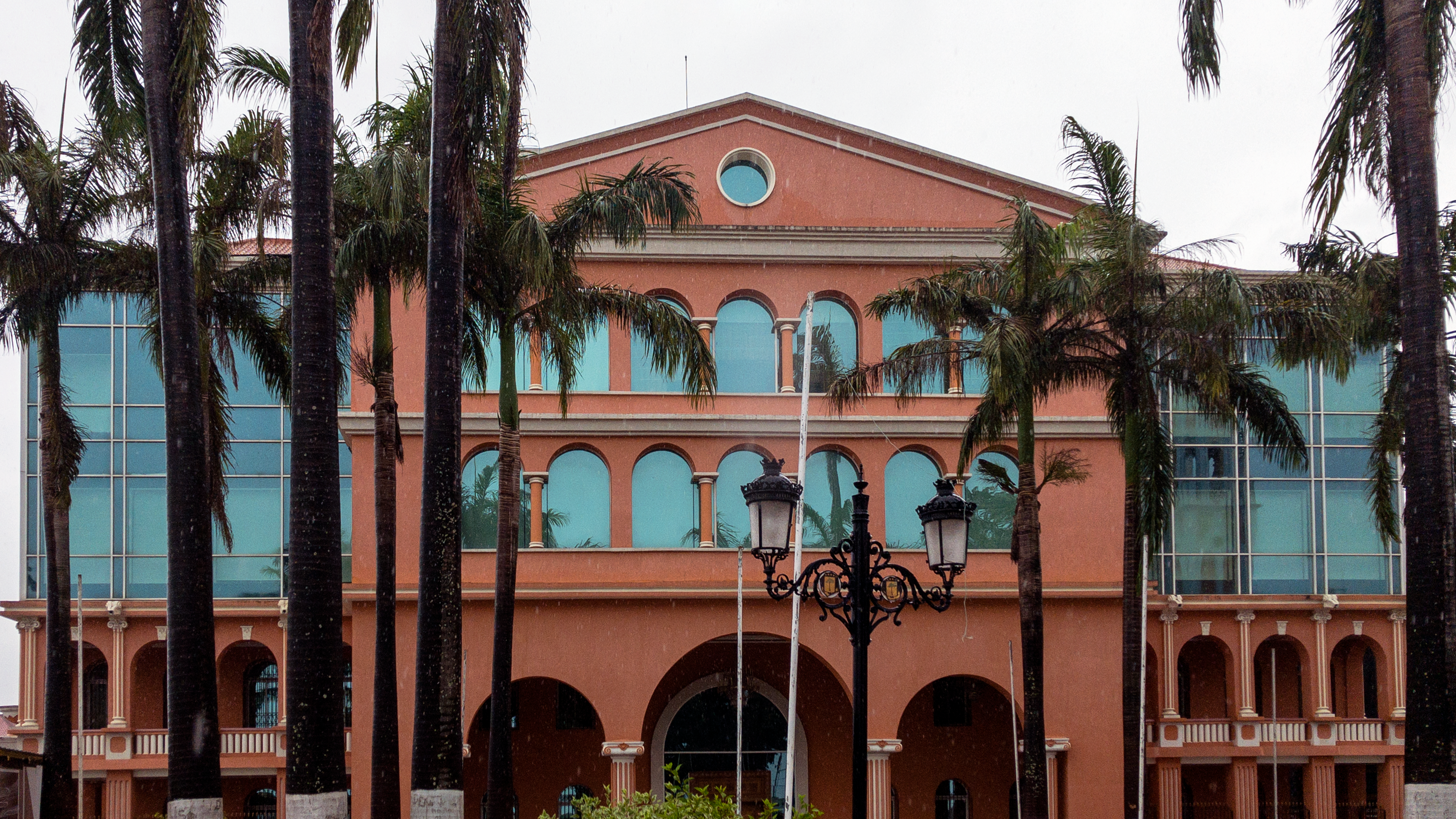
Presidential palace of Nguema's father Teodoro Obiang in Malabo, Equatorial Guinea

As Minister of Agriculture and Forestry, Nguema was paid €3,200 a month.

The New York Times reported in 2004 that Nguema was "a rap music entrepreneur and bon vivant, fond of Lamborghinis and long trips to Hollywood and Rio de Janeiro". Superyacht Tatoosh was hired for £400,000 by him for a Christmas cruise on which he entertained rapper Eve.

Nguema drew criticism from the international media for spending close to R10,000,000 over a weekend in South Africa on champagne, property renovations, a black 2004 Bentley Arnage, a cream 2003 Bentley Continental R from MG Rover Cape Town and a 2005 Lamborghini Murcielago, although some assets may soon be forcibly auctioned due to his failure to pay a South African businessman. American law enforcement officials believe that most or perhaps all of his wealth comes from corruption connected to oil and gas reserves in Equatorial Guinea.

Nguema's foreign interests include two houses in South Africa, worth a combined R50,000,000, a $31,000,000 compound in Malibu, California, US, a 5,000 square feet (460 m^{2}) home on Avenue Foch in the affluent 16th arrondissement of Paris, and the hip hop music record label TNO Entertainment. In 2008 he owned one of the 30 models of the Bugatti Veyron 16.4 sports car (estimated at €1,100,000) and a Maserati MC 12 at €700,000. He went on to purchase another Bugatti Veyron, and tried to purchase a third. In late 2011, both Veyrons, as well as nine other cars he owned, were seized by French police investigating corruption. In July 2013, the confiscated goods were sold at auction.

On 19 January 2013, Nguema's father, Teodoro Obiang, arrested Roberto Berardi, an Italian building contractor, active for 20 years in Africa. After working in Cameroon, Berardi had formed a construction company with him, but discovered some strange operations on the current account and asked for an explanation. A few hours later, the Italian contractor was arrested on charges of fraud and embezzlement. Berardi was fined 1.2 million euros and jailed. No charges were brought from Italy against Obiang. Berardi was released on 9 July 2015 after more than two years of detention.

On 18 October 2016, Swiss prosecutors opened an investigation on Nguema after he landed eight times in Geneva. French authorities had asked them for judicial assistance. He eventually reached an accommodation with the Swiss, letting them sell his seized luxury cars, valued at 18.5 million Swiss francs, and the payment of 1.3 million Swiss francs. On 27 September 2019, in an auction organised by British auctioneers Bonhams, 25 luxury cars were sold for 23.4m Swiss francs.

On 14 September 2018, Nguema flew on an official plane to Brazil with other 9 passengers and had some of their 19 bags searched by the Brazilian border police in Viracopos-Campinas International Airport. They found approximately US$1.4 million in cash and 20 watches with estimated value of US$15 million.

Obiang acquired private jets through British Virgin Islands shell companies.

=== Embezzlement charges ===
In October 2011, seven years after the United States Senate Homeland Security Permanent Subcommittee on Investigations exposed the Nguema's family secret accounts at Riggs Bank in Washington and five years after non-profit Global Witness discovered his mansion purchase in Malibu; the US Justice Department went to court to seize $70 million (£44m) of his US assets, which include a Gulfstream jet, yachts, cars and Michael Jackson memorabilia.

On 11 June 2012, the United States Department of Justice (DoJ) filed an amended complaint against Nguema, after a judge requested more evidence of the alleged corruption. The revised complaint states that he spent $315 million on properties and luxury goods between 2004 and 2011. According to the foreign complaint, he, while Minister of Forestry, levied personal "taxes" against local and foreign timber companies for licenses to operate and export timber, such as a $28.80 tax for every log exported, to fund his lavish lifestyle. The foreign prosecutors state that his expenditures "were inconsistent with both his known salary of less than $100,000 per year, and the income he purportedly generated from his companies." In October 2014, he reached a settlement with the United States Department of Justice to pay the U.S. DoJ some of the funds held at accounts on his behalf, as well as his Malibu home, a Ferrari, and portions of his Michael Jackson collection, for a total estimated value of US$34 million. Upon the resolution of the settlement, he was able to keep his Gulfstream Jet, as well as some of the Michael Jackson memorabilia, including the $275,000 crystal Michael Jackson glove which he wore during his 1987–89 "Bad" tour, and other assets. $20 million of the proceeds was pledged, on DOJ's website, to go to a charitable institution for the benefit of the people of Equatorial Guinea. Another $10.3 million was pledged to be used for the benefit of the people of Equatorial Guinea "to the extent permitted by law." Since both of these pledges, there have been no records of the funds sent to any of the citizens, nor any of the infrastructure of Equatorial Guinea.

In February 2012, a Parisian mansion belonging to Nguema, worth around €100 million, was raided by French police and they discovered luxury goods inside worth millions of euros. In July 2012, an arrest warrant was issued for him. The mansion was seized by French authorities in August 2012. He was indicted by the French justice on several counts of corruption and money-laundering with an 'in absentia' trial beginning in 2017. In response, Equatorial Guinea filed a case against France in the International Court of Justice accusing France of breaching the diplomatic immunity of its representatives and premises. In the preliminary phase the court found that France must guarantee the protection of the premises presented as housing the diplomatic mission of Equatorial Guinea in France. In December 2020 it ruled that the mansion was never a diplomatic premises.

In September 2016, the District Attorneys Roger Le Loire and Charlotte Bilger referred Nguema to the Criminal Court of Paris, and issued an arrest warrant through Interpol. This procedure was validated by the International Court of Justice in December 2016.

The French trial concluded in October 2017 with Nguema receiving a suspended sentence of three years plus a suspended fine of €30 million. His properties in France, as well as 17 luxury cars, were also seized, including the Parisian mansion.

=== UK sanctions ===
On 22 July 2021, the United Kingdom imposed sanctions on Nguema over "lavish lifestyle" spending, which he spent on mansions, private jets, among other things. In retaliation, the Foreign Minister of Equatorial Guinea, Simeón Oyono Esono Angue, announced the closure of the country's embassy in London, as the British government sanctioned Nguema. The Minister said that it was the first measure and that Equatorial Guinea "will not allow interference in internal affairs".

=== Brazil sanctions ===
In January 2025, Brazilian authorities charged Nguema with money laundering. The charges stem from allegations that he used embezzled public funds to purchase a $2.5 million apartment in Brazil and attempted to enter the country in 2018 with $16 million in cash and luxury items.

Political offices
| Preceded by Office established | Second Vice President of Equatorial Guinea; 2012–present | Incumbent |
