= Military ranks of Equatorial Guinea =

The Military ranks of Equatorial Guinea are the military insignia used by the Armed Forces of Equatorial Guinea. Being a former colony of Spain, Equatorial Guinea shares a rank structure similar to that of Spain.

== Commissioned officer ranks ==
The rank insignia of commissioned officers.

Rank group	General / flag officers		Senior officers			Junior officers
Army of Equatorial Guinea
Army of Equatorial Guinea	General de division	General de brigada	Coronel	Teniente coronel	Comandante	Capitán	Teniente	Alférez
Navy of Equatorial Guinea
Navy of Equatorial Guinea	Vice almirante	Contra almirante	Capitán de navío	Capitán de fragata	Capitán de corbeta	Teniente de navío	Alférez de navío	Alférez de fragata
Equatorial Guinea Air Force
Equatorial Guinea Air Force	General de division	General de brigada	Coronel	Teniente coronel	Comandante	Capitán	Teniente	Alférez
Rank group	General / flag officers		Senior officers			Junior officers

== Other ranks ==
The rank insignia of non-commissioned officers and enlisted personnel.

Rank group	Senior NCOs			Junior NCOs		Enlisted
Army of Equatorial Guinea
Army of Equatorial Guinea	Brigada	Sargento primero	Sarjento	Cabo primero	Cabo	Soldado
Navy of Equatorial Guinea
Navy of Equatorial Guinea	Brigada		Sarjento	Cabo primero	Cabo	Marinero
Equatorial Guinea Air Force
Equatorial Guinea Air Force	Brigada	Sargento primero	Sarjento	Cabo primero	Cabo	Soldado
Rank group	Senior NCOs			Junior NCOs		Enlisted
