= Tadiran =

Israeli air-conditioning and electrical appliances conglomerate

Tadiran was an Israeli conglomerate founded in 1962 by the merger of two companies, Tadir and Ran.

Tadiran had interests in electronics, home appliances (refrigeration and air conditioning), telecommunications, batteries, medical systems and defence electronics.

The brand name survives through the company's numerous products. They include:

- Tadiran Telecom
- Tadiran Telecommunications
- Tadiran Batteries
- Tadiran Air Conditioners
- Tadiran Appliances
- Tadiran Electronic Systems
- Tadiran Spectralink
- Tadiran Communications
- Tadiran LifeCare
- Tadiran Telematics

These brands and business are described below.

== Tadiran Telecom ==
- Tadiran Telecom – a manufacturer of business telecommunications equipment, privately held company owned by Afcon Industries which is controlled by the Shlomo Group.

== Tadiran Batteries (owned by Saft Groupe S.A.) ==
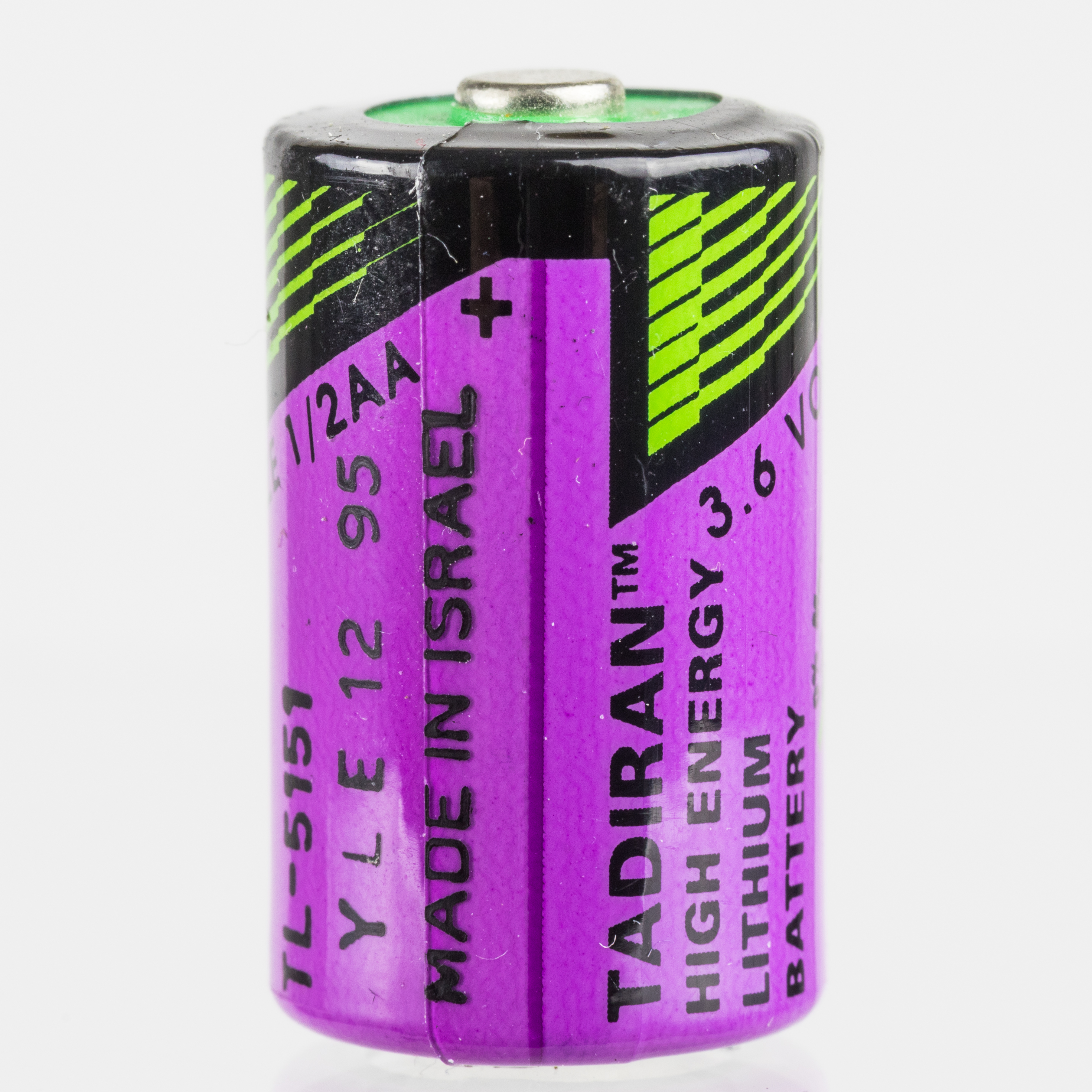
- Tadiran Israel TL-5151 3.6 Volt Lithium battery. Size: half AA
  Tadiran Batteries – One of the world's largest suppliers of Lithium batteries. The company is a wholly owned subsidiary of the Saft Groupe S.A. of France, which was created in January 2004 when the Doughty Hanson Funds bought the batteries business of Alcatel (who originally purchased Tadiran Batteries in 2000).

== Tadiran Air Conditioners, Tadiran Appliances (owned by Tadiran Holdings) ==
Tadiran Appliances (also known as Tadiran Air Conditioners), was acquired by the Carrier Corporation, the world's largest manufacturer and distributor of heating, ventilating and air conditioning (HVAC) systems, itself a subsidiary of United Technologies Corporation (UTC) of the US and a constitute of Dow Jones Industrial Average. Carrier initially acquired 26% of the company in 1997 and took full ownership of it in 2004.

In October 2009, Carrier sold Tadiran Appliances to Crystal Consumer Products, a white goods distributor in Israel, which shortly afterwards changed its name to Tadiran Holdings (TASE: TDRN).

In the past, Tadiran Appliances used to manufacture a wide range of White goods, including: refrigerators and freezers; stoves and ovens; TV sets (assembly of Italy's Voxson models) and Radio sets and Car Radios. However, today only the Air conditioning business remains active (and still has the highest market share by far in Israel).

In January 2021, Tadiran Appliances filed an international patent for a new air conditioning system that purifies 99.999% of viruses, germs and bacteria.

== Tadiran Telecommunications (merged with ECI Telecom) ==
- Tadiran Telecommunications – was a manufacturer of networking infrastructure solutions for carrier and service providers listed on NASDAQ (NASDAQ: TTELF). In September 1998 Tadiran Telecommunications merged with ECI Telecom Ltd. In July 2007 ECI Telecom was acquired by a private equity group and, after 25 years, has been delisted from Nasdaq.

== Tadiran Electronic Systems, Tadiran Spectralink, Tadiran Communications -> Elbit Systems ==
- Tadiran Electronic Systems – a manufacturer of military electronic equipment now part of the Elisra Group.
- Tadiran Spectralink – a supplier of advanced wireless communications products for crewed and uncrewed aircraft, also part of the Elisra Group.
- Tadiran Communications – a supplier of Military HF and VHF tactical radios and communication systems

In July 2008 Tadiran Communications and Elbit Systems merged, which brought all three of the above companies to exist under one group (this since Elisra Group itself is a subsidiary of Elbit Systems).

== Tadiran LifeCare (owned by Aerotel Medical Systems) ==
Tadiran LifeCare was a division within Tadiran Spectralink, established to design and develop wireless monitoring solutions for healthcare applications. Tadiran LifeCare was acquired by Aerotel Medical Systems in January 2007.

== Ituran & Tadiran Telematics ==
Ituran was established in 1994 by the Tadiran conglomerate to develop and operate a service for locating stolen vehicles using a telematics technology that was originally developed for military use at Tadiran Telematics, a subsidiary of Tadiran Communications. The technology involved transmitting location and status data from the vehicle to a control center. In 1995 Tadiran decided to sell the Ituran concept to a group of investors for US$250,000.

In 1998, the company had an initial public offering on the Tel Aviv Stock Exchange, raising the capital required to develop the service overseas in the United States, Brazil and Argentina.

In November 1999, Ituran acquired Tadiran Telematics, which continued to manufacture the tracking devices and components of the vehicle tracking system Ituran was using for its services, for $10 million. The acquisition enabled Ituran to reduce the cost of the systems it sold. Ituran changed the company's name to Telematics Wireless.

In 2004, Telematics Wireless won contracts to install and deploy vehicle tracking systems in Korea and China, for local companies developing a service similar to Ituran's.

In 2005, Ituran raised approximately $50 million in an initial public offering on Nasdaq, which gave the company a value of $294 million.

In November 2007, Ituran sold Telematics Wireless to Singapore based ST Electronics, part of the ST Engineering corporation, for $90 million.
