= Sa'ar (disambiguation) =

Sa'ar is a kibbutz in northern Israel.

Sa'ar may refer to:

== Ship classes ==
- Sa'ar 3-class missile boat
- Sa'ar 4-class missile boat
- Sa'ar 4.5-class missile boat
- Sa'ar 5-class corvette
- Sa'ar 6-class corvette
- Sa'ar 72-class corvette
- Sa'ar 62 class offshore patrol vessel

== Other uses ==
- Gideon Sa'ar (born 1966), Israeli politician
- IAI Sa'ar, an Israeli fighter jet based on the Dassault Super Mystère

== See also ==
- Saar (disambiguation)
