= Armed Forces of Equatorial Guinea =

National army of equatorial guinea

- Fuerzas Armadas de Guinea Ecuatorial
- Coat of arms of Equatorial Guinea
- Service branches: Army of Equatorial Guinea; Navy of Equatorial Guinea; Equatorial Guinea Air Corps

Leadership
- Supreme Commander of the Armed Forces and State Security: Teodoro Obiang Nguema Mbasogo
- Minister of Defence: General Antonio Mba Nguema
- Chief of the General Staff: Tertuliano Obama Alogo Angue

Personnel
- Conscription: 18 years of age, 2 years selective compulsory service
- Active personnel: 2,400

Expenditure
- Percent of GDP: 0.1% (2006 est.)

Industry
- Foreign suppliers: United States; Russia; Czech Republic; China; Belgium; South Africa; North Korea; Israel

Related articles
- Ranks: Military ranks of Equatorial Guinea

The Armed Forces of Equatorial Guinea (Spanish: Fuerzas Armadas de Guinea Ecuatorial; French: Forces armées de la Guinée équatoriale; Portuguese: Forças Armadas da Guiné Equatorial) consists of approximately 2,500 service members. The army has almost 1,400 soldiers, the navy 200 service members, and the air force about 120 members. There is also a gendarmerie, but the number of members is unknown. The Gendarmerie is a new branch of the service in which training and education is being supported by the French Military Cooperation in Equatorial Guinea. Military appointments are all reviewed by President Teodoro Obiang, and few of the native militiamen come from outside of Obiang's Mongomo-based Esangui clan. Obiang was a general when he overthrew his uncle, Francisco Macías Nguema.

== History ==
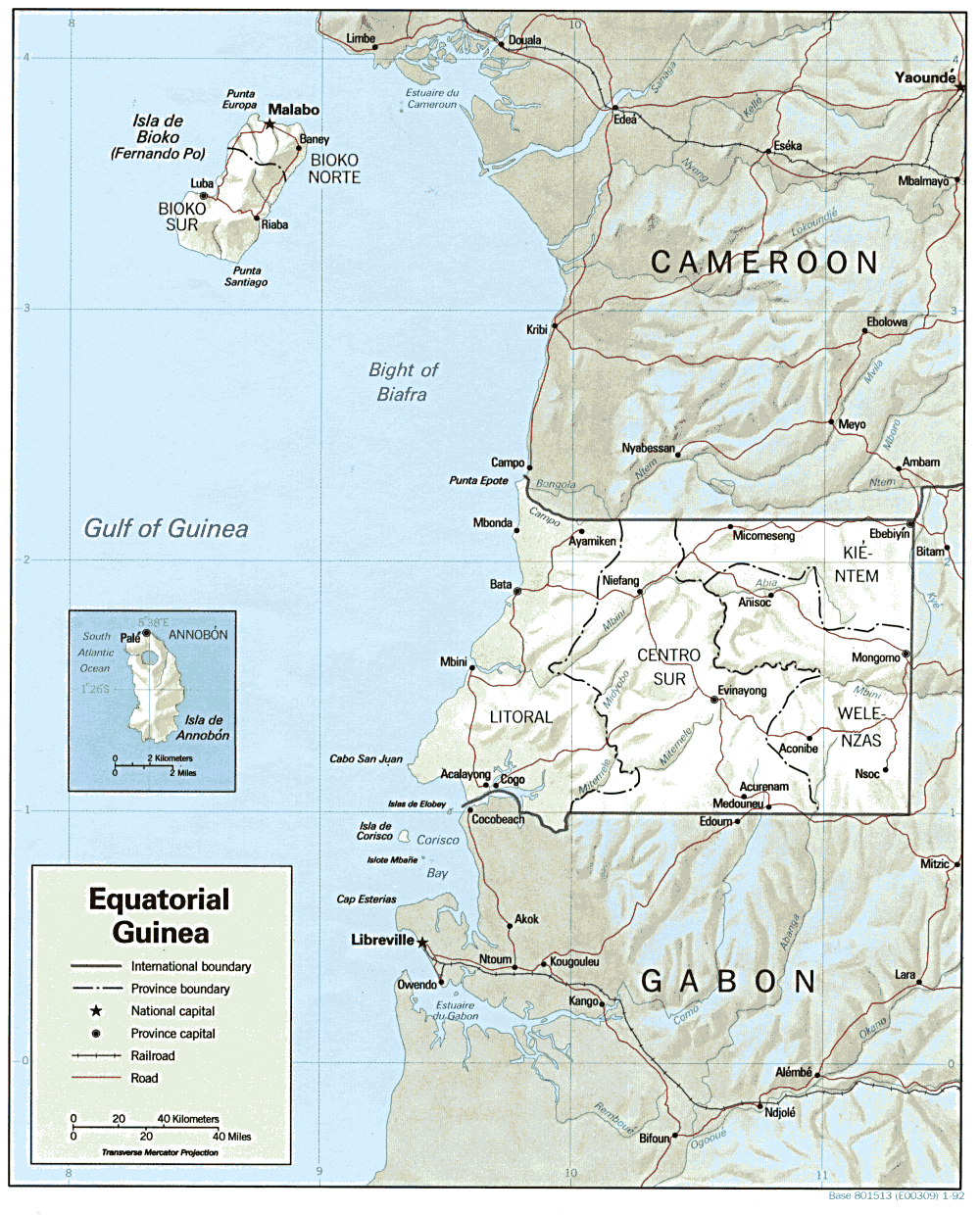
Map of Equatorial Guinea elaborated by CIA in 1992.

The Armed Forces were reorganized in 1979. In 1988, the United States donated a 68-foot patrol boat to the Equatoguinean navy to patrol its exclusive economic zone. The U.S. patrol boat Isla de Bioko is no longer operational. U.S. military-to-military engagement has been dormant since 1997 (the year of the last Joint Combined Exchange Training exercise). Between 1984 and 1992, service members went regularly to the United States on the International Military Education Training program, after which funding for this program for Equatorial Guinea ceased. The government spent 6.5% of its annual budget on defense in 2000 and 4.5% of its budget on defense in 2001. It recently acquired some Chinese artillery pieces, some Ukrainian patrol boats, and some Ukrainian helicopter gunships. Cooper and Weinert 2010 says that all aircraft are based on the military side of Malabo International Airport.

In 2002, an International Consortium of Investigative Journalists report said:

"The oil companies do not view Equatorial Guinea's military – a product of decades of brutal dictatorial rule – with much confidence. The army is believed to have only about 1,320 men under arms, the navy 120, and the air force 100. Seven of the army's nine generals are relatives of the president; the other two are from his tribe. There is no clear command structure, the level of discipline is low, and professionalism and training are almost non-existent, according to locals and foreign oil workers. Even the presidential guard – an indication of the lack of trust in the country's forces – is composed of 350 Moroccan troops."

== Equipment ==
=== Armour ===
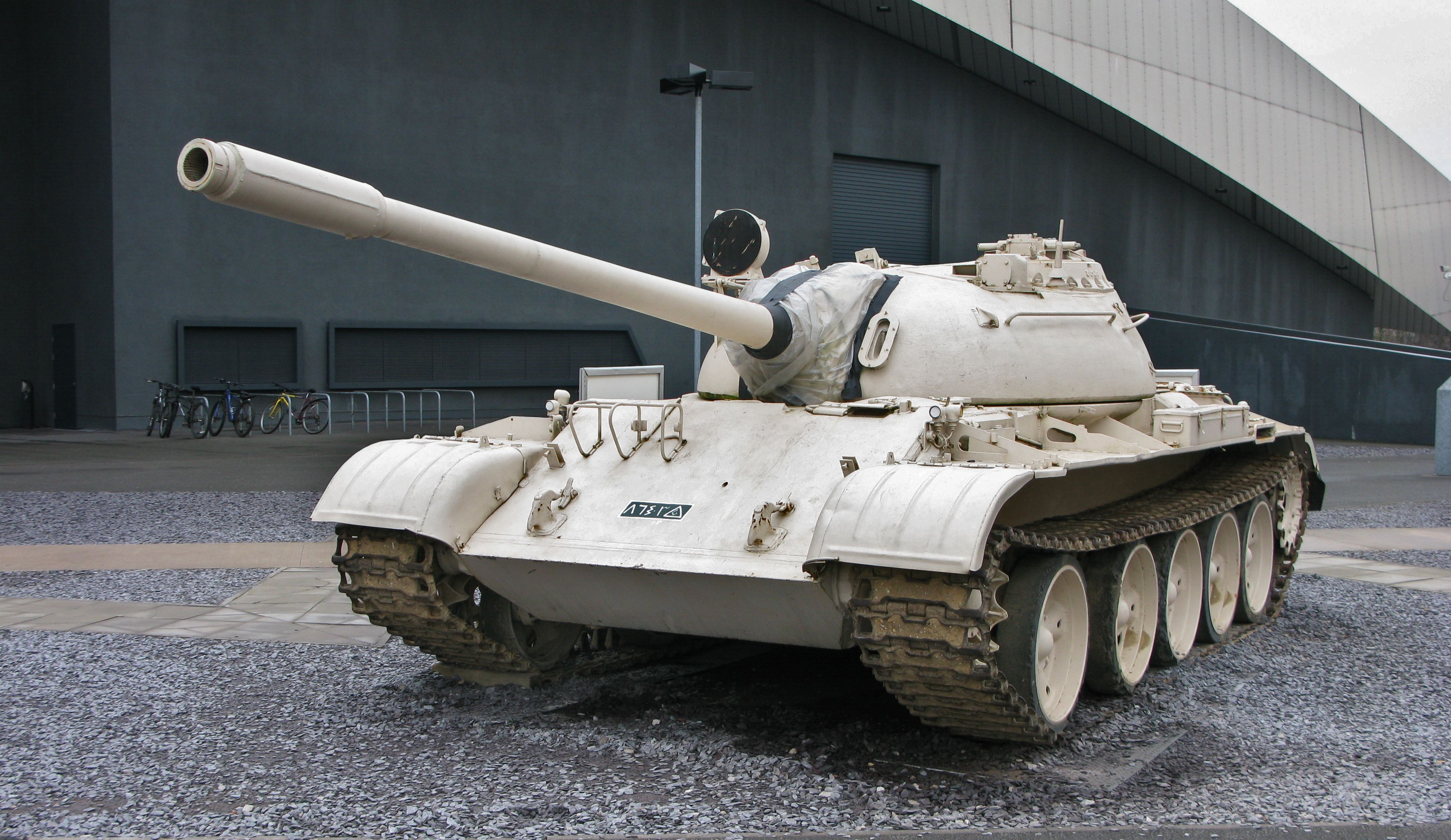
A T-55 Main Battle Tank

Name	Origin	Type	In service	Notes
Armored fighting vehicle
T-55	Soviet Union	Main battle tank	3	
BRDM-2	Soviet Union	Armored scout car	6	
BMP-1	Soviet Union	IFV	20	Acquired from the Czech Republic in 2007.
BTR-152	Soviet Union	Armoured personnel carrier	10	
Reva	South Africa	Mine-Resistant Ambush Protected	25	
WZ-551	China	IFV		Unknown number, IFV, recovery and fire-support variants seen.
Pantsir-S1	Russia	Anti-aircraft artillery	2	

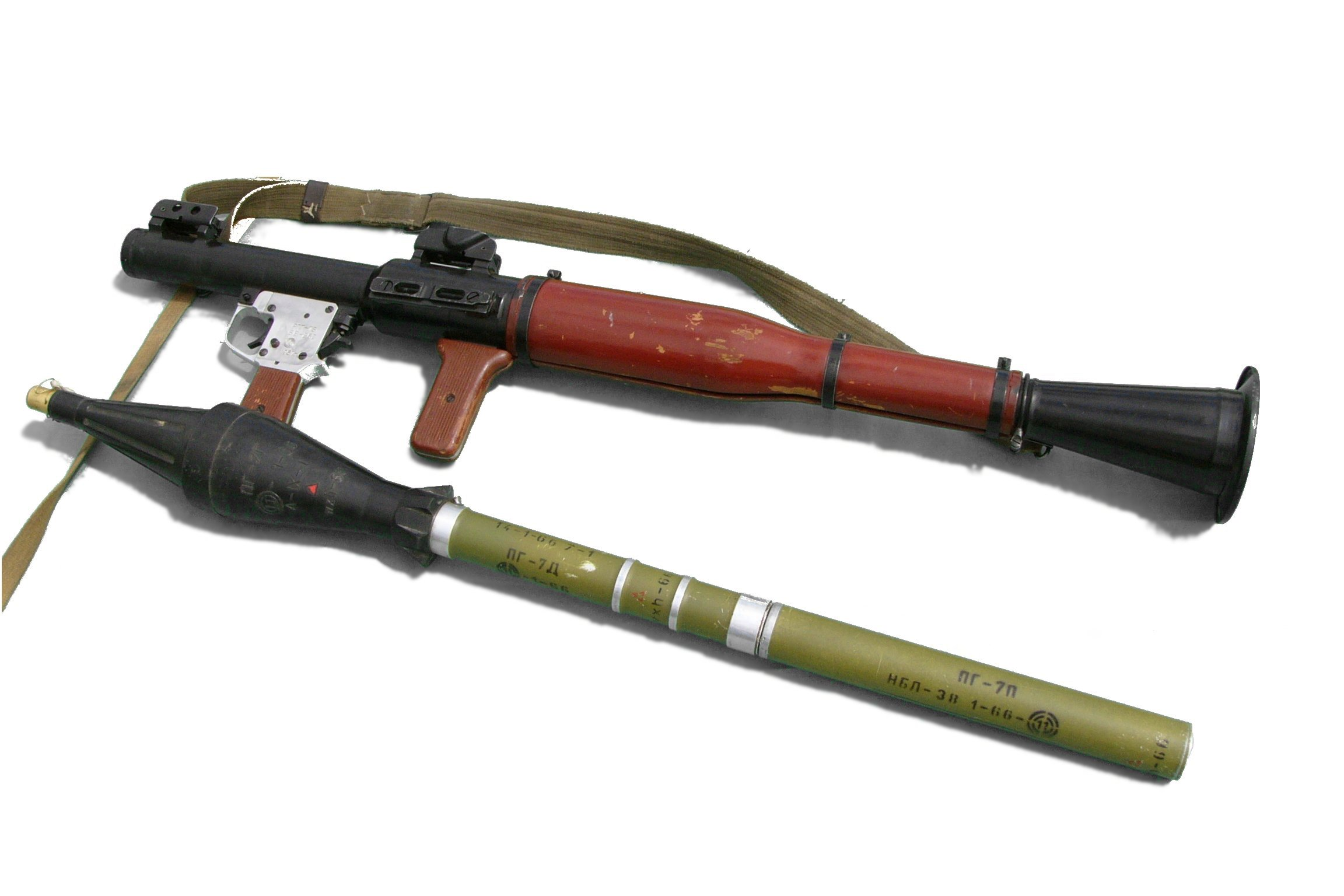
An RPG-7 Rocket-propelled grenade launcher

=== Small arms ===
Name	Origin	Type	Notes
AKM	Soviet Union	Assault rifle	
FN FAL	Belgium	Battle rifle	
RPD	Soviet Union	Light machine gun	
RPG-7	Soviet Union	Rocket-propelled grenade	
Type 56	China	Assault rifle	
SKS/Type 56 Carbine	Soviet Union/China	Semi-automatic carbine	

=== Aircraft ===
The Equatorial Guinea Air Corps was founded in 1979 with mainly French and Spanish air frames. In 2005, 4 Su 25s including 2 Su-25UB combat trainers were delivered to the Equatorial Guinea Air Corps. The current status of the aircraft is unknown. In 2015 two CASA C-295 (one transport and one surveillance) aircraft were ordered for delivery from September 2016.

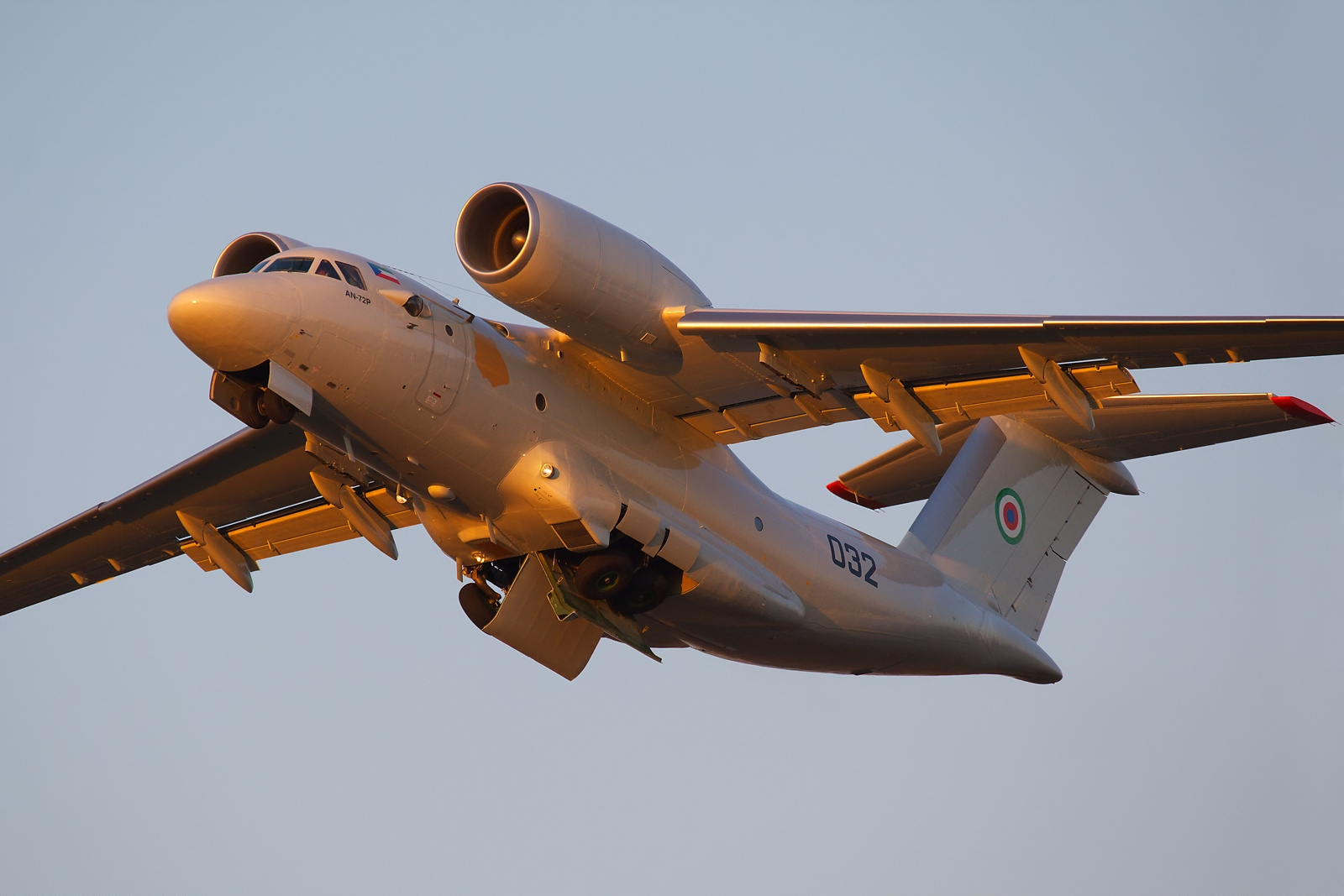
An Antonov An-72P on lift off

=== Current inventory ===
Aircraft	Origin	Type	Variant	In service	Notes
Combat aircraft
Sukhoi Su-25	Russia	attack		2	
Transport
Ilyushin Il-76	Soviet Union	heavy transport		1	
Antonov AN-12	Soviet Union	heavy transport		1	
Antonov An-72	Soviet Union	transport	An-72P	2	
Let L-410 Turbolet	Czech Republic	transport		2	
Antonov An-32	Soviet Union	transport	An-32B	1	
Dassault Falcon 900	France	VIP transport		1	
Helicopters
Mil Mi-24	Soviet Union	attack	Mi-24P/V	7	
Kamov Ka-27	Russia	utility	Ka-29	1	
Mil Mi-26	Russia	utility / transport		1	
Mil Mi-17	Soviet Union	utility		1	
Harbin Z-9	China	utility	Z-9WE	2	
Bell 206	United States	utility		1	
Enstrom 480	United States	utility		1	
Trainer aircraft
Aero L-39	Czech Republic	jet trainer		2	
Sukhoi Su-25	Soviet Union	Jet trainer		2	

== Navy ==
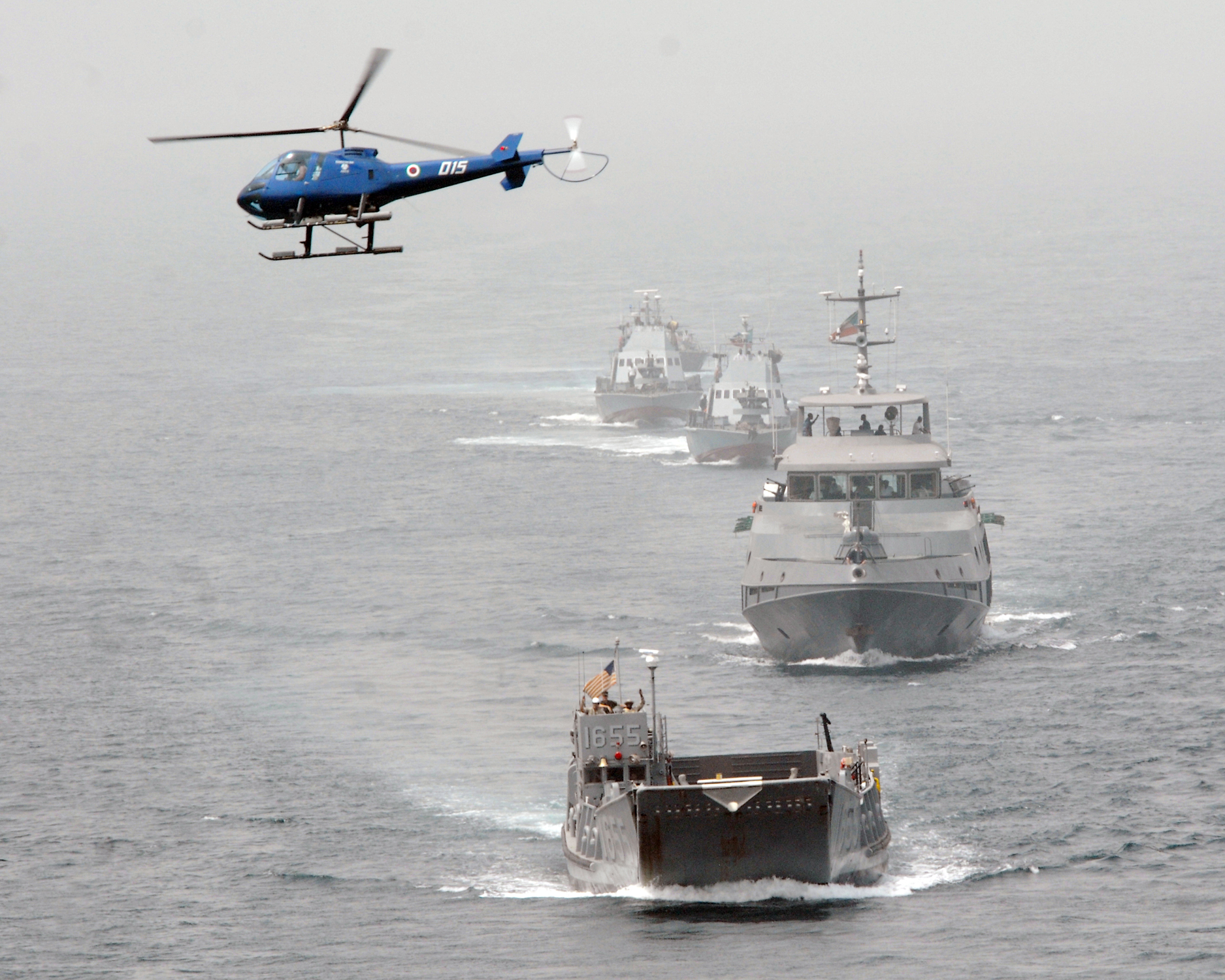
Joint U.S.-Equatorial Guinea naval exercises off the coast of Equatorial Guinea on February 2, 2008. Behind the American landing craft 1655 sail three Guinean patrol boats, the first being the patrol boat Daphne and the other two being Isla de Corisco and Isla de Annobon.

The Equatorial Guinean main task is to counter piracy and robbery at sea. In July 2010, after the visit of Brazilian president Luiz Inácio Lula da Silva, an order for a Barroso-class corvette was announced. However, as of 2014 no further news has been announced. On 3 June 2014, the frigate Wele Nzas was commissioned and became the navy's flagship.

Vessel	Origin	Type	In service	Notes
Wele Nzas (F073)	Bulgaria	Frigate	1	Ukrainian designed - modified locally
Bata	Bulgaria	Corvette	1	Ukrainian design
PV-50	Ukraine	Patrol vessel	2	
Isla de Corisco	Israel	Patrol boat	1	Shaldag class
Isla de Annobon	Israel	Patrol boat	1	Shaldag class
Sa'ar 4 class	Israel	Patrol boat	2	
Osa	China	Landing ship	1	Salamandra class
Daphne	Denmark	Patrol boat	1	

== Higher education and training ==
On 6 November 2016, the Zimbabwe Defence Forces deployed a training contingent to the Equatorial Guinea to train the country's military officers on operational and logistic matters following an urgent request by the West African country. The security personnel contingent is composed of members of the Zimbabwe National Army and Air Force of Zimbabwe. In 2018, 28 graduates from the military received diplomas from the Nakhimov Naval Academy in Sevastopol.
