= USCGC Walnut =

Two cutters of the United States Coast Guard have been named Walnut

- USCGC Walnut (WLM-252), a 175 ft (53 m) tender commissioned 27 June 1939 originally WAGL-252.
- USCGC Walnut (WLB-205), a 225 ft (69 m) Juniper-class seagoing buoy tender commissioned in 1999.
