= ERM Telematics =

Israeli electronic company

ERM Electronic Systems Ltd. ERM Advanced Telematics
- Company type: Subsidiary of a public company (Nasdaq: ITRN),(TASE: ITRN)
- Industry: Telematics, Vehicle Tracking, Vehicle Security
- Founded: 1985
- Founder: Meir Hayman
- Headquarters: Rishon LeZion, Israel
- Area served: Worldwide
- Key people: Meir Hayman, Kfir Lavi, Oren Hayman, Saar Avraham, Eitan Kirshenboim,
- Products: Tracking Devices, Driver Behavior Devices; Vehicle Alarm and Immobilizers
- Services: Vehicle Tracking System; Fleet Management Services
- Owner: Ituran Group, Meir Hayman
- Number of employees: 120
- Parent: Ituran
- Website: www.ermtelematics.com/

ERM Electronic Systems ltd., also known as ERM Advanced Telematics, is an Israeli electronic company specializing in the design, development, and manufacture of vehicle security and GPS tracking devices for the telematics and fleet management industry. ERM Advanced Telematics operates globally, providing telematics devices for Stolen Vehicle Recovery (SVR) and Fleet Management Solutions (FMS).

As of June 2013, the company had manufactured over 950,000 active devices worldwide.

Since 2006, ERM has been a subsidiary of Ituran Group (NASDAQ:ITRN).

== Corporate history ==
ERM Advanced Telematics was founded in May 1985 as ERM Electronic Systems Ltd by Meir Hayman. The company was focused on the design and development of vehicle security systems and manufactured its devices using third party facilities.

1998 – ERM moved to its new location in the west of Rishon LeZion where, for the first time, it launched its new SMT lines, and since then all design, manufacturing, and assembling is done in-house.

March 2000 – Cellular network-based M2M (Machine to Machine), technology, which was much cheaper and easily spread due to the efforts of cellular providers, gained popularity and slowly replaced the old RF technology in various markets. Soon, ERM began manufacturing its first line of telematics device – SkyLink.

September 2006 – Ituran, being a public company, acquired 51% of ERM Electronic Systems and started moving all its new customers to GSM/GPS technology based on ERM's devices.

ERM then launched its new StarLink Family of Telematics products and began to gain new knowledge about the automotive industry.

January 2013 – ERM was re-branded as an international vendor for Telematics and Tracking technologies and changed its name to ERM Advanced Telematics.

April 2013 – ERM released its Safety technology for Driver Behavior monitoring and an internal Black Box functionality.

December 2013 – ERM launched its patented (US 8612137B2) Jamming Mitigation solution for the US and South America regions. The solution involves both hardware with cellular and proprietary RF communication, as well as software methodology.

May 2014 – ERM launched its fuel monitoring technology.

July 2014 – ERM launched its first OBD solution requested by partner for Usage Based Insurance applications for insurance companies

March 2015 – ERM launched its ERM India office in Bangalore (in 2019 moved to Delhi and Pune)

September 2016 – ERM released its CANEngine technology for CANBUS monitoring and diagnostic, which includes a set of supported products for non-intrusive CANBUS monitoring, CANBUS analysis, and additional customized valuable functionalities to create valuable information from CANBUS data.

February 2017 – Added the fourth SMT line.

March 2017 – ERM declared its Wireless Connect strategy which will enable its partners and customers wireless interface to various sensors and accessories.

August 2017 – ERM launched its first Wi-Fi product, which can support several wireless technologies, including long and short range, in parallel with cellular coverage.

July 2019 – ERM launched its AIS140 certified device for the Indian market.

August 2019 – ERM launched its first Electric Vehicle (EV) telematics product for Micro Mobility vehicles.

October 2019 – ERM launched its IoTLink family of Asset and IoT monitoring products which includes hardware and software solutions.

== See also ==
- Economy of Israel
- Vehicle tracking system
- Location-based service
- Telematics
