= Saar =

Saar or SAAR has several meanings:

== People ==
=== Given name ===
- Saar Ganor, Israeli archaeologist
- Saar Klein (born 1967), American film editor

=== Surname ===
- Ain Saar (born 1968), Estonian (Võro) punk rocker and freedom fighter
- Alison Saar (born 1956), American artist
- Amit Saar (1978–2026), Israeli intelligence officer
- Andrus Saar (1946–2015), Estonian sociologist and media scholar
- Anti Saar (born 1980), Estonian children's writer and translator
- Betye Saar (1926–2026), American artist
- Elmar Saar (1908–1981), Estonian footballer and coach
- Erik Saar, American intelligence officer
- Evar Saar (born 1969), Estonian (Võro) non-fiction writer
- Ferdinand von Saar (1833–1906), Austrian writer
- Getter Saar (badminton) (born 1992), Estonian badminton player
- Getter Saar (born 1999), Estonian footballer
- Gideon Sa'ar (born 1966), Israeli politician
- Heleri Saar (born 1979), Estonian footballer
- Indrek Saar (born 1973), Estonian actor and politician
- Jüri Saar (born 1956), Estonian politician
- Katriin Saar (born 2002), Estonian tennis player
- Ketlin Saar (born 1997), Estonian footballer
- Leonid Saar (1913–2010), Estonian basketball player, ice hockey player and footballer
- Margus Saar (born 1966), Estonian television journalist and producer
- Martin Saar (born 1980), Estonian artist
- Mart Saar (1882–1963), Estonian composer
- Olivia Saar (1931–2025), children's writer, poet, journalist and editor
- Takács de Saár, Hungarian noble family
- Tõnu Saar (1944–2022), Estonian actor
- Ulla Saar (born 1975), Estonian illustrator, product designer, graphic artist, and interior designer
- Valeri Saar (born 1955), Estonian military major general

== Places ==
- Sa'ar, a kibbutz in Israel
- Saar, Bahrain, a town in Bahrain
- Saar Region and Saar Area—in context, any of the following:
  - Saarland, a state of Germany, often referred to as "the Saar"
  - Saar (League of Nations), a League of Nations governed territory (1920–35)
  - Saar Protectorate, a French protectorate (1947–56)
  - Sarre (département), a French département (1798–1814)
  - Saar (river), a navigable river running through the borderlands of France and Germany
- Saar (Rhine), a tributary of the Alpine Rhine in the Swiss canton of St. Gallen
- Saar (Werra), a tributary of the Werra in Thuringia, Germany
- Sarre, Aosta Valley, a town and comune in Aosta Valley region of North-Western Italy
- South American–Antarctic Ridge, a mid-ocean ridge in the South Atlantic
- Žďár nad Sázavou in Moravia, now Žďár nad Sázavou, which was called Saar under the Austrian monarchy

== Other uses ==
- Several classes of Israeli missile boats:
  - Sa'ar 3-class missile boat
  - Sa'ar 4-class missile boat
  - Sa'ar 4.5-class missile boat
  - Sa'ar 62 class offshore patrol vessel
  - Sa'ar 5-class corvette
  - Sa'ar 6-class corvette
  - Sa'ar S - 80-class corvette
- SS Saar, a German cargo ship in service 1937–45
- German submarine tender Saar, a WWII submarine tender
- Rosario - Islas Malvinas International Airport, ICAO airport code: SAAR
- SAAR Foundation
- Seasonally Adjusted Annual Rate, also Industry SAAR
- Saar (film series), a series of Indian Kannada-language comedy films by Rajendra Singh Babu
