= Mickaël Pariente =

Mickaël Parienté
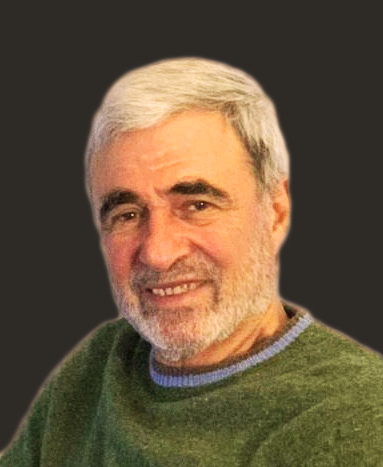
- Native name: מיכאל פריאנטה
- Born: June 6, 1947 (age 78) Meknes, Morocco
- Occupation: Writer, publisher, columnist
- Language: French, Hebrew
- Genre: Prose, essay

Mickaël Parienté (Hebrew: מיכאל פריאנטה) is a French-Israeli author, editor, and columnist.

== Biography ==
Born on June 6, 1947, in Meknes, Morocco, at the time of the French presence, Parienté lived until the age of fifteen in the old Mellah, the Jewish quarter of his hometown. Trilingual (Judeo-Arabic, Hebrew, French) since his early childhood, he babbled his first words in Judeo-Moroccan Arabic; he learned Hebrew at the Talmud Torah by reading psalms and prayers; and did his primary studies in French at the Alliance Israélite Universelle.

After his secondary education in the village of young Nitsanim, an agricultural boarding school, he studied electronics at the Israeli Air Force School. After his military service, he completed a two-year training course in Switzerland in telecommunications. He worked for seven years at Tadiran, as director for installation of public telephone exchanges and published two books that were used in Bezeq schools for the training of telecom technicians. He developed a sequential method to simplify the study of the functions of a telephone exchange.

In 1978, he established his own company, Technical Writing and offered services to the electronics industry as well as to the Israeli Ministry of Defense.

In 1979, he founded Hayofi, a beauty and aesthetics magazine, one of the first of its kind, which was published by subscription among beauticians and women's facialists, and distributed to newsstands throughout Israel.

In 1980, he founded the Stavit publishing house, where he published literary and ethnographic works in Hebrew and French. He thus became one of the few French-speaking publishers in Israel. At the same time, he pursued a self-taught career in graphic design and became art director of several magazines, including Moznaim, the writers' union, Politica initiated by the Meretz party, Mifagash, a Hebrew-Arabic literary periodical...

He has been living in France since 1988, where he continues his editorial activity and publishes mainly translations of Israeli authors into French. At the same time, he was for more than three years the artistic director of Famille & éducation, a monthly magazine with a circulation of one million copies for UNAPEL, the association of parents of free education students.

In 2006, Parienté defended his doctoral thesis: "La littérature israélienne traduite en français et publiée entre 1948 et 2005 - Étude bibliographique et socio-littéraire" (Israeli literature translated into French and published between 1948 and 2005 - A bibliographic and socio-literary study), which he obtained with the distinction "Très honorable avec félicitations du jury". Within the framework of this thesis, he published two bibliographical works: 2000 titles with a Jewish theme - 1420 authors, prefaced by Emmanuel Le Roy Ladurie, 1996, ed. StavNet, and Littératures d'Israël, 2003, ed. StavNet. It develops a thematic bibliographic search engine listing all Israeli works translated into French from 1948 to 2005. It is currently being updated and put online.

Within the framework of its editions, it publishes mainly literary and ethnographic works, in Hebrew as well as in French, including a boxed set of four books. These include Jewish Life in Morocco - Arts and Traditions, a collective work co-published with the Israel Museum; The Saga of the Families of the Jews of Morocco, by Joseph Toledano; and Judeo-Moroccan Proverbs, collected and commented on by Hanania Dahan (two volumes in Arabic and Hebrew).

He writes stories, novels and editorials in French and Hebrew, which are published regularly in Israel and France. He is a member of the Tel Aviv journalists' union.

== Family ==
His mother, Séti, belonged to the Amar family, a line of great rabbis and notables of the Jewish community of Meknes. She died at the age of 25, leaving her husband, Jacob Parienté, aged 27, and four children aged from eight years to six months. From his first wife, Myriam Cohen, he has a daughter Stavit and three grandchildren, Maya, Noam and Amitai. In 1990 he married Adriana Masel, born in Buenos Aires, the fourth Argentine generation of Jewish families: Masel and Braunstein, who came from Russia in the 19th century.

== Cultural activities ==
Mickaël Parienté devotes, in Israel as in France, a large part of his life to creating bridges between the triangle of his three cultures: French, Arab and Jewish. As a cultural mediator and entrepreneur, he has designed and implemented cultural projects, including

- Galerie Stavit (Stavit Gallery - Israeli Contemporary Arts)
- Lectures - Club littéraire et artistique du judaïsme contemporain (Literary and artistic club of contemporary Judaism)
- L'Autre Parnasse - Librairie-café méditerranéenne (The Other Parnassus - Mediterranean coffee shop bookstore)
- Salon du livre et de la presse internationale de Genève (Geneva Book Fair - Israel stand guest of honor 1998)

== Literary works ==
Fiction

- Rue de la Grande chaumière (French original version)
- רחוב הבקתה הגדולה (Hebrew original version)
- L'Autre Parnasse (French original version)
- פרנסוס האחר (Hebrew original version)
- The Other Parnasus (English translation)
- El Otro Parnaso
- A l'Ombre des Murailles
- בצל החומות (Hebrew original version)

Trilogy of books for children - Illustrated by Alec Borenstein

- סבא, בוא מהר! (Papi, come quickly!)
- סבא, אתה מבולבל! (Grandpa, are you distracted!)
- סבא, בוא למדבר! (Papi, come to the desert!)

Essays

- Israël: Politique et Société – De Ben Gourion à Netanyahou (French original version)
- Israël: Politik und Gesellschaft – Von Ben-Gurion bis Netanyahu (German translation)

== Thematic works ==
- 2000 titres à thème juif – (Prefaced by Emmanuel Le Roy Ladurie)
- Littératures d'Israël

== Published articles ==
Times of Israel

- Zemmour: «Faux messie» ou «Homme providentiel»
- Premier ministre haï, serait-il troqué par un clone?
- Le «démon ethnique» frappe à nouveau
- Les risques du confinement en France par rapport à l’expérience israélienne
- Mimouna, Oui! Instrumentalisation, Non!
- Deux «suicides» de plus sur l’autel du pouvoir
- Gantz: Proie d’un magicien ou d’un fraudeur?
- Une honte et une déception encore
- Encore un coup fourré du Shass
- Encore une déclaration raciste à la veille des élections en Israël
- Opposition à la circoncision: tendance ou crise d’identité
- L’État d’Israël pris en otage par son Premier ministre
- Pourquoi nombre de Marocains soutiennent Netanyahou?
- L’État d’Israël contre Netanyahou
- Cuisine électorale à l’israélienne
- La revanche des démunis
- L’imbroglio électoral israélien
- La France n’est pas antisémite

Le Monde

- Fin du pouvoir sans limite des éditeurs, Amazon est là!
- En Israël, une “gauche” disloquée aborde les prochaines élections

Liberation

- La littérature hébraïque ou israélienne?

Jerusalem Post

- Une main de fer dans un gant de velours

HaAretz

- על שלוש חביות אבק שריפה יושבים אנו
- בועה יהודית חדשה ומסוכנת בפוליטיקה הצרפתית
- המוצא היחידי - חוק משילות חדש
- איזנקוט, אל תיכנע לשד העדתי
- לליכוד אין מנהיג ליום שאחרי
- בשבחי ברית המילה
- נתניהו משתמש במרוקאים
- אם גנץ באמת רוצה להצליח
- היורדים מעניקים שירות חינם למדינה
- אבי גבאי, פנה את מקומך לאהוד ברק
- מעוררי השד העדתי
- צרפת אינה אנטישמית
- על שערוריית סלון הספרים של פאריס

Ynet

- ברכה לסופרים ולקוראים, סוף לאַדְנוּת של המו"לים

זמן ישראל

- תפוס כפי יכולתך

מעריב

- הרצון להחליף את נתניהו הוא ברור, אך לא בכל מחיר

מוניטין

- בחלומות שלי אני עוקף את העסקנות והפוליטיקה

פוליטיקה

- עפ נפנים ליתיד

== Press reviews ==
- רחוב הבקתה הגדולה (Hebrew original version)
- L'Autre Parnasse (French original version)
- פרנסוס האחר (Hebrew original version)
- El Otro Parnaso
- A l'Ombre des Murailles
- בצל החומות (Hebrew original version),
- 2000 titres à thème juif,
- Littératures d'Israël,
- סבא, בוא מהר! (Papi, come quickly!)
- סבא, אתה מבולבל! (Grandpa, are you distracted!)
- סבא, בוא למדבר! (Papi, come to the desert!)
- Israël: Politique et Société – De Ben Gourion à Netanyahou (French original version),
- Israël: Politik und Gesellschaft – Von Ben-Gurion bis Netanyahu (German translation) .
