= Equatoguinean frigate Wele Nzas =

Multi-mission frigate of the Navy of Equatorial Guinea

History

Equatorial Guinea
- Name: Wele Nzas
- Namesake: Wele-Nzas Province
- Builder: MTG Dolphin Shipyard, Varna, Bulgaria; Astilleros de Guinea Ecuatorial S.A., Malabo, Equatorial Guinea
- Laid down: 21 May 2012
- Launched: 26 February 2013
- Commissioned: 3 June 2014
- Identification: Pennant number: F073
- Status: In active service

General characteristics
- Type: Multi-mission frigate
- Displacement: 2,500 tonnes (2,500 long tons)
- Length: 107 m (351 ft 1 in)
- Beam: 14 m (45 ft 11 in)
- Draft: 3.7 m (12 ft)
- Propulsion: 4 × Caterpillar C280 diesel engines; 2 × shafts
- Speed: 25 knots (46 km/h; 29 mph)
- Range: 5,000 nmi (9,300 km; 5,800 mi)
- Sensors & processing systems: Positiv-U air/surface search radar; Delta-M fire control radar w/ Cascade self-defense system; ESM antenna; SATCOM antenna; 2 × navigation radars; 2 opto-electronic FCS
- Armament: 2 × 76.2 mm AK-176 guns; 2 × 30 mm AK-630M autocannons; 2 × 140 mm MS-227 22-barreled rocket launchers
- Aircraft carried: 1 × helicopter
- Aviation facilities: Flight deck

Wele Nzas (F073) is a Ukrainian-designed, Bulgarian-built multi-mission frigate of the Navy of Equatorial Guinea. The frigate serves as flagship of the navy and was commissioned in 2014.

== Design and description ==
Wele Nzas has a length of 107 m (351 ft 1 in), a beam of 14 m (45 ft 11 in) and draft of 3.7 m (12 ft 2 in). The frigate has estimated displacement of 2,500 tonnes (2,500 long tons) and is powered by four Caterpillar C280 diesel engines connected to two screws. She has a top speed of 25 knots (46 km/h; 29 mph) and range of 5,000 nmi (9,300 km; 5,800 mi).

The ship is armed with two 76.2 mm AK-176 naval guns, each on fore and aft of the ship, two 30 mm AK-630M autocannons located in either side of the funnel, and two MS-227 140 mm 22-barreled rocket launchers in front of the bridge. In addition, the ship could be fitted with guided missiles on the midship.

Her sensors and electronic systems consisted of Positiv-U air/surface search radar with radome, Delta-M fire control radar integrated with Cascade self-defense system, two navigation radars, two opto-electronic target designation and fire control systems, satellite communication antenna and ESM antenna.

Wele Nzas also has a raised helicopter flight deck amidships and carries some boats launched by davits.

== Construction and career ==
The ship was designed by Asaba Design Center in Mykolaiv, Ukraine. Her keel was laid on 21 May 2012 at MTG Dolphin Shipyard in Varna, Bulgaria. The ship was launched on 26 February 2013 as the salvage and rescue vessel Savior (IMO: 9664500) under Project SV 02. She was procured from Bulgaria using proxy entities in Panama and the Comoros. The ship was then fitted with weaponry in a 210 m (690 ft) navy-owned floating dock at Malabo harbor, Equatorial Guinea by the Astilleros de Guinea Ecuatorial S.A. (ASABA GE) with the help of Ukrainian technicians. Armament and combat systems used on the ship was probably sourced by Impulse 2, a Ukrainian company.

Wele Nzas was commissioned on 3 June 2014 in a ceremony at Malabo harbor by the President Teodoro Obiang Nguema Mbasogo. The president declared the frigate as the flagship of Equatorial Guinenan Navy. The ship was named after the Province of Wele-Nzas. She served as deterrent against threats of piracy in the Gulf of Guinea.
