= Honduran Navy =

- Fuerza Naval de Honduras
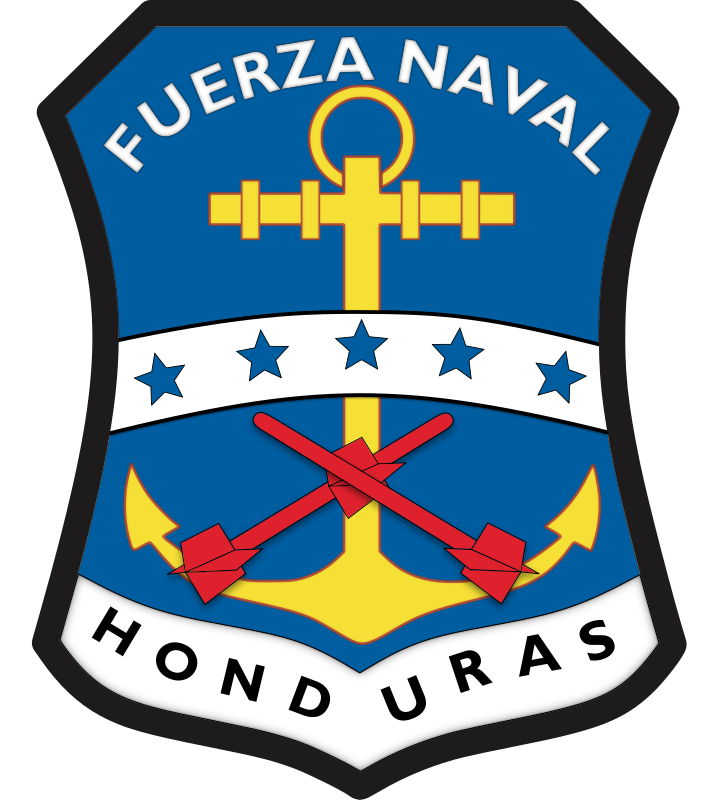
- Founded: 14 August 1976; 50 years ago
- Country: Honduras
- Type: Navy
- Role: Naval warfare
- Size: 4.000
- Part of: Armed Forces of Honduras
- Patron: Our Lady of Suyapa
- Mottos: Spanish: Mares azules y no manchados de sangre ante zozobras Blue and blood-clean seas in face of risky waters
- Colors: Blue and White
- Engagements: World War II

Commanders
- General Commander of the Honduran Navy: Ship Captain Juan Antonio De Jesús Rivera

The Navy Force of Honduras is one of the Armed Forces of Honduras's three branches.

The Honduran Navy was created through a presidential decree in the 14th of August 1976, with the stated goal of defending Honduran territorial waters, both in the Caribbean and the Pacific coasts.

== History ==
=== Background ===
During Brigadier José Santos Guardiola's presidency, there was an attempt to organize a navy, but due to the lack of funds it didn't come to be. The government acquired some ships, but no warships. In 1860, the government had 200 men from the army mustered into a schooner in order to aid the British screw sloop HMS Icarus, which had been stationed in British Honduras, in combating an invasion by the filibuster William Walker. Walker was ambushed near the Sico Tinto Negro River, captured, and, nine days later, found guilty and executed.

In September 1865, during Captain General José María Medina's presidency the Honduran Military Marine was instituted, with the president boarding the schooner Colibrí.

Afterwards, in the 1890s, a contract was signed with a German firm for the construction of two steamers, named Tatumbla and 22 de Febrero, with gross tonnages of 108 and 22 tons, capable of steaming at 10 and 7 knots, respectively, both built in Kiel. The Tatumbla had two guns. In the early 1900s, another steamer was commissioned, the Hornet; only in 1934 would the next acquisitions come, with the Bufalo and the Zambrano. During the 1940s, the Tiger, the General Carias and the General Cabañas were acquired.

=== World War II ===
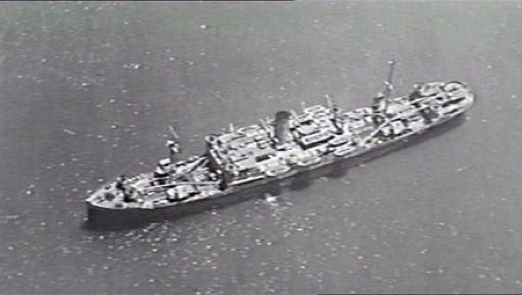
SS Contessa, Honduran-flagged cargo and passenger ship active during World War II.

Honduras maintained good diplomatic relations with Germany between the end of the 19th Century and the 1930s. During this period, many businesses were opened by German immigrants in Honduras, and when World War II started in Europe, some citizens of German descent left the country to fight for Germany. The country's ports were on occasion used by German submarines for resupply.

After the Japanese attack on Pearl Harbor, due to diplomatic pressure from the United States, relations with the Axis powers were broken. On December 8, 1941, Honduras declared war on Japan, and, four days later, on Italy and Germany, with Honduras thus joining the Allies. Some ships carrying Honduran goods had already been sunk by this point, and the situation worsened over the following months, with many Honduran ships sunk; around 200 Honduran citizens were killed. In the following years, Honduran pilots and sailors were involved in World War II.

=== Professional Naval Force ===
Honduran naval pennant

In November 1950, a regulation for the Navy's insignia and uniforms was issued by the government, and in April 1964, the first two officers and 14 enlisted men (who belonged to the Army's Third Infantry Battalion) were assigned to it. One of the officers, Ensign O'Connor Bain, was sent to the US Coast Guard Reserve Officer Training Center in Yorktown, Virginia, and the other, Ensign Regalado Hernández, together with the enlisted men, to the Naval Base Panama Canal Zone, where they were trained by Panamaian and North American officers. Afterwards, they formed the "First Boats Detachment", equipped with US donated patrol boats, which would be used as the core for the Navy when it was formally created in 1976, with Lieutenant Colonel Bain as its first commander.

In 1977, the Navy acquired three ships, the Guaymuras, 105 feet long, and the Patuca and the Ulua, both 65 feet long. In 1982, it was also given the 40+ year old tender USCGC Walnut, renamed to Yojoa; it served until 1998, when it was lost during Hurricane Mitch. These were the Navy's only proper ships until 1988, when it received the Landing Craft Utility Punta Caxinas, capable of transporting 100 tons of cargo and still in service as of 2021. A few years later, a new Peterson Mk3 patrol boat was acquired, and in 2013 a further two Damen Stan Patrol 4207 also were.

== Active Naval Bases ==
The Honduran Navy operates from four main naval bases, but it also has another two installations.

Honduran Navy Installations
Name	Location	Notes/Mission
Puerto Cortés Naval Base	Puerto Cortés, Cortés Department	Headquarters station on the Caribbean coast, host to the Naval Studies Center and the Naval Repairs Center
First Marine Infantry Battalion HQ	La Ceiba, Atlántida	
Honduras Naval Academy	La Ceiba, Atlántida	Founded in February 2000, it is tasked with training officers for the Navy; these may later on continue their studies in the Honduras Defence University.
Puerto Castilla Naval Base	Puerto Castilla, Colón	WWII-era naval base in the Caribbean coast
Amapala Naval Base	Amapala, Valle	Base on the Tiger Island in the Pacific coast
Caratasca Naval Base	Caratasca Lagoon, Gracias a Dios	

== Fleet ==
Class	Origin	Type	In service
Damen Stan 4207 patrol vessel	Netherlands	Patrol Vessel	2
Sa'ar 62-class offshore patrol vessel	Israel	Patrol vessel	1
Guardian patrol boat	United States	Patrol vessel	2
Swiftship patrol boat	United States/Israel	Patrol vessel	9
Various classes	Various	Interceptor/patrol launches	79
LCM-8 LCU	United States	Landing craft	4
Golfo de Tribuga-class LCU	Colombia	Landing craft	1

== Commanders ==
Honduran Navy Commanders
Order	Commander	Beginning of term	Term end
1	Infantry Lieutenant Colonel Erin O'Connor Bain	1976	1978
2	Infantry Colonel José Matías Hernández García	1978	1980
3	Brigadier General Rubén Humberto Montoya	1980	1984
4	Infantry Colonel Humberto Regalado Hernández	1984	1986
5	Infantry Colonel Ronnie H. Martínez Méndez	1986	1987
6	Infantry Colonel Carlos Reyes Barahona	1987	1988
7	Ship Captain Leonel Martínez Minera	1988	1989
8	Brigadier General Arnulfo Cantarero López	1989	1990
9	Brigadier General Luis Alonso Discua Elvir	1990	1991
10	Brigadier General Reinaldo Andino Flores	1991	1993
11	Rear Admiral Giordano Bruno Fontana Hedman	1993	1997
12	Ship Captain Ricardo Reyes Rivera	1997	1999
13	Ship Captain Hermán Iván Ramírez Lanza	1999	2000
14	Rear Admiral Rolando Gonzáles Flores	2000	2002
15	Artillery Colonel Nelson Willy Mejía Mejía	2002	2004
16	Rear Admiral José Eduardo Espinal Paz	2004	2007
17	Rear Admiral Juan Pablo Rodríguez Rodríguez	2008	2011
18	Rear Admiral Ramón Cristóbal Romero Burgos	2011	2011
19	Vice Admiral Rigoberto Espinoza Posadas	2011	2013
20	Rear Admiral Héctor Orlando Caballero Espinoza	2013	2015
21	Rear Admiral Jesús Humberto Benítez Alvarado	2015	2017
22	Ship Captain Efraín Mann Hernández	2017	2019
23	Ship Captain José Jorge Fortín Aguilar	2019	2021
24	Ship Captain Pablo Antonio Rodríguez Sauceda	2021	2023
25	Ship Captain Austacil Hagarin Tomé Flores	2024	2025
26	Ship Captain Ricardo De Jesús Dubon Cabrera	2025	2025
27	Ship Captain Juan Antonio De Jesús Rivera	2025	2026

== Ranks ==
=== Commissioned officer ranks ===
The rank insignia of commissioned officers.

Rank group	General / flag officers		Senior officers			Junior officers
Honduran Navy
Honduran Navy	Vicealmirante	Contralmirante	Capitán de navío	Capitán de fragata	Capitán de corbeta	Teniente de navío	Teniente de fragata	Alferez de fragata

=== Other ranks ===
The rank insignia of non-commissioned officers and enlisted personnel.

Rank group	Senior NCOs			Junior NCOs	Enlisted
Honduran Navy					No insignia
Honduran Navy	Contramaestre I	Contramaestre II	Contramaestre III	Cabo de cubierta	Marino de cubierta
