= Counter admiral =

Rank found in many navies of the world

Counter admiral is a military rank used for high-ranking officers in several navies around the world, though the rank is not used in the English-speaking world, where its equivalent rank is rear admiral. The term derives from the French contre-amiral. Depending on the country, it is either a one-star or two-star rank. In modern navies that use it, counter admiral is generally, although not always, the lowest flag officer rank. In the German Navy, for instance, Flottillenadmiral ranks below Konteradmiral; in the Royal Canadian Navy, contre-amiral (rear admiral in English) ranks above commodore.

== French-speaking countries ==
In France and other French-speaking countries' navies the rank of contre-amiral is used as the lowest flag officer. It is usually placed above ship-of-the-line captain (French: capitaine de vaisseau) and below vice admiral (French: vice-amiral).

== Germany ==
Konteradmiral is a NATO OF-7 (two-star rank) of the Deutsche Marine (German Navy), equivalent to the Generalmajor ("major general") in the German Army and the German Air Force.

== Nordic countries ==
The rank of counter admiral is used in all the Nordic countries.

=== Denmark and Norway ===
In 1771, the rank of schout-bij-nacht was removed and replaced with the rank of counter admiral (Danish/Norwegian: kontreadmiral).

=== Finland ===
Counter admiral is the more direct translation of Finnish kontra-amiraali, a two-star rank used in the Finnish Navy and the Finnish Border Guard. However, it is usually translated as rear admiral in international use.

== Portuguese speaking countries ==
In the navies of Brazil and Angola the rank of contra-almirante is the lowest of the flag officer ranks. In the navies of Portugal and Mozambique the rank of contra-almirante is the second lowest, above that of comodoro (commodore).

Until the end of the 19th century, the present rank of contra-almirante was named chefe de esquadra (chief of squadron), both in the Portuguese and in the Brazilian navies.

== Russia and other former communist countries ==
Kontr-admiral was the lowest flag officer rank of the Soviet Navy and is the lowest flag rank of the Russian Navy, similar to an OF-6 officer.

== NATO code ==
While the rank of counter admiral is used in a number of NATO countries, it is ranked differently depending on the country.

NATO code	Country	English equivalent	
NATO code	Country	UK	US
OF-7	Bulgaria, Canada, Croatia, Denmark, Estonia, Germany, Latvia, Lithuania, Montenegro, Norway, Portugal, Romania, Slovenia	Rear admiral	Rear admiral
OF-6	Albania, France, Italy, Poland, Spain	Commodore	Rear admiral (lower half)

== Gallery ==
Kundëradmiral
(Albanian Naval Force)

Contra-almirante
(Angolan Navy)

Contralmirante
(Argentine Navy)

Kontr-admiral
(Azerbaijani Navy)

Contre amiral
(Benin Navy)

Contraalmirante
(Bolivian Navy)

Contra-almirante
(Brazilian Navy)

Контраадмирал
Kontraadmiral
(Bulgarian Navy)

Contre-amiral
(Cameroon Navy)

Contre-amiral
Rear-admiral
(Royal Canadian Navy)

Contraalmirante
(Chilean Navy)

Contralmirante
(Colombian National Navy)

Contre-amiral
(Navy of the Democratic Republic of the Congo)

Contre-amiral
(Congolese Navy)

Kontraadmiral
(Croatian Navy)

Contralmirante
(Cuban Revolutionary Navy)

Kontreadmiral
(Royal Danish Navy)

Contralmirante
(Dominican Navy)

Contralmirante
(Ecuadorian Navy)

Contralmirante
(Navy of El Salvador)

Kontradmiral
(Estonian Navy)

Contra almirante
(Navy of Equatorial Guinea)

Kontra-amiraali
Swedish: Konteramiral
(Finnish Navy)

Contre-amiral
(French Navy)

Contre-amiral
(Gabonese Navy)

Konteradmiral
(German Navy)

Contralmirante
(Honduran Navy)

Contrammiraglio
(Italian Navy)

Contre-amiral
(Navy of Ivory Coast)

Контр-адмирал
Kontr-admïral
(Kazakh Naval Forces)

Kontradmirālis
(Latvian Naval Forces)

Kontradmirolas
(Lithuanian Naval Force)

Contre-amiral
(Madagascar Navy)

Contraalmirante
(Mexican Navy)

Kontra admiral
(Montenegrin Navy)

Contre-amiral
(Royal Moroccan Navy)

Contra-almirante
(Mozambique Naval Command)

Contralmirante
(Nicaraguan Navy)

Kontreadmiral
(Royal Norwegian Navy)

Contraalmirante
(Paraguayan Navy)

Contraalmirante
(Peruvian Navy)

Kontradmirał
(Polish Navy)

Contra-almirante
(Portuguese Navy)

Contraamiral
(Romanian Naval Forces)

Contraamiral de flotilă
(Romanian Naval Forces)

Контр-адмирал
Contre-admiral
(Russian Navy)

Contre-amiral
(Senegalese Navy)

Контра Адмирал
Kontra admiral
(Serbian River Flotilla)

Kontraadmiral
(Slovenian Navy)

Contra almirante
(Spanish Navy)

Konteramiral
(Swedish Navy)

Contre-amiral
(Togolese Navy)

Contre-amiral
Arabic: أمير لواء بالبحرية, romanized: 'amir liwa' bialbahria
(Tunisian Navy)

Kontr-admiral
(Turkmen Naval Forces)

Контр-адмірал
Kontr-admiral
(Ukrainian Navy)

Contraalmirante
(National Navy of Uruguay)

Contraalmirante
(Venezuelan Navy)
