= Ulla Saar =

Estonian illustrator

- Born: 4 January 1975 (age 51); Tallinn, then part of Estonian SSR, Soviet Union
- Occupations: Estonian illustrator, product designer, graphic artist, and interior designer

Ulla Saar (born 4 January 1975 in Tallinn) is an Estonian illustrator, product designer, graphic artist, and interior designer.

She has graduated from Estonian Academy of Arts in product design.

Her illustrations for the children's book Lift received international attention and she was listed in 2014 White Ravens catalogue.
