= USCGC Walnut (WLM-252) =

Coordinates: 15.826421°N 87.933787°W

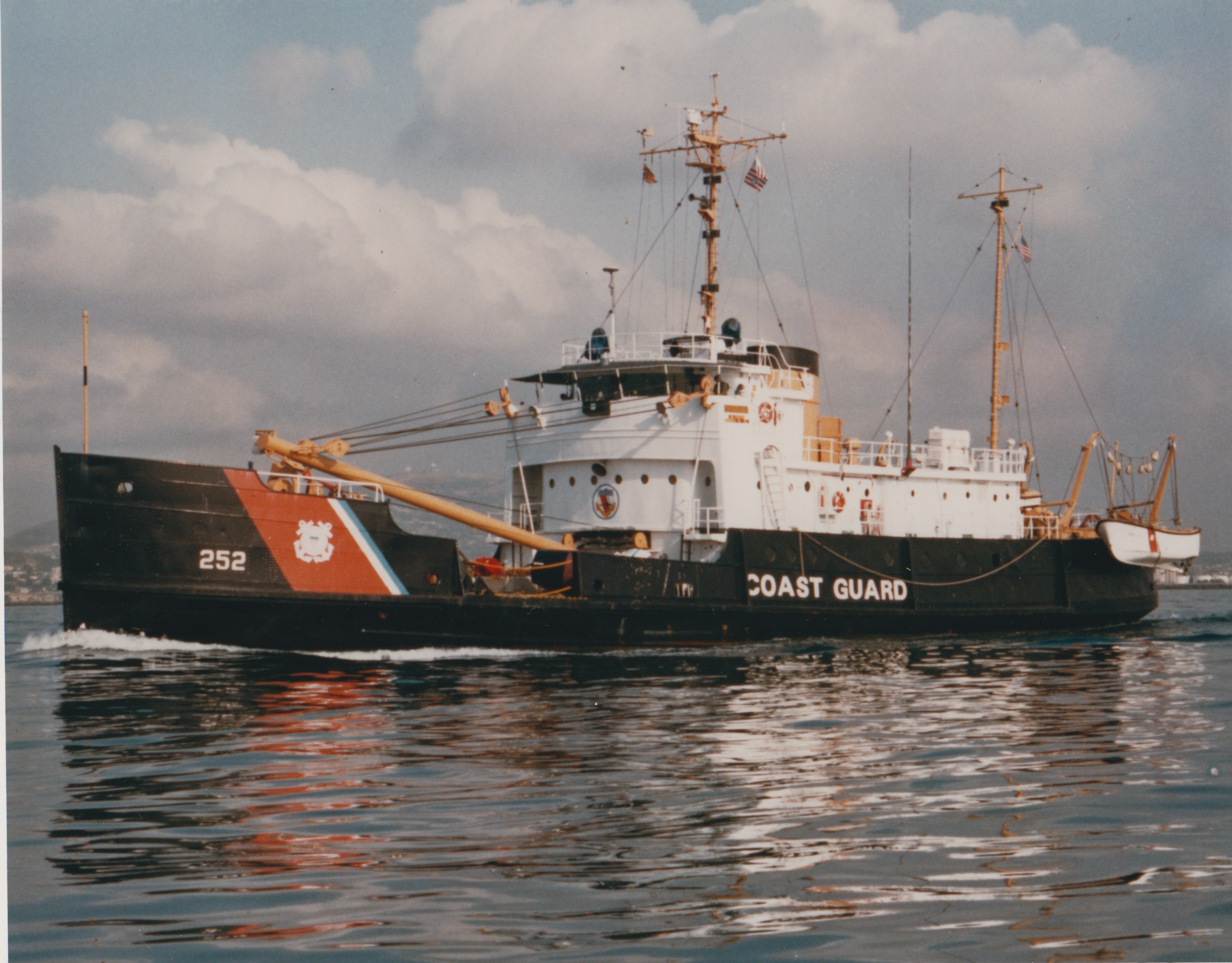
- USCGC Walnut underway, 1981

History

United States
- Name: Walnut
- Namesake: Walnut
- Operator: United States Lighthouse Service; United States Coast Guard
- Builder: Moore Dry Dock Company Oakland, California
- Commissioned: 8 July 1939
- Decommissioned: 1 July 1982
- Fate: Transferred to Honduras

Honduras
- Name: Yojoa
- Operator: Honduran Navy
- Acquired: 1982
- Out of service: 1998
- Identification: FNH–252
- Fate: Wrecked during Hurricane Mitch, 1998

General characteristics
- Type: General, Lighthouse tender WAGL; Coastal Buoy tender, WLM
- Displacement: 885 tons.
- Length: 174 ft 8 1/2 in (53.251 m)
- Beam: 32 ft (9.8 m)
- Draft: 11 ft 3 in (3.43 m)
- Ice class: Reinforced bow and stern. Ice-belt at water-line, notched forefoot.
- Installed power: Original: 2 triple-expansion steam, horizontal engines; 2 oil-fired Babcock & Wilcox watertube boilers; Diesel conversion: (1951); 2 four-cylinder Fairbanks-Morse 38D 8-1/8; 2 Detroit Diesel 100kW generators
- Propulsion: Twin screws; 1,000 shp (750 kW) (steam); 1,350 shp (1,010 kW) (diesel)
- Speed: 12 knots (22 km/h; 14 mph)
- Range: 2,000 mi (3,200 km)
- Complement: 4 officers, 1 warrant officer, 69 enlisted (1945)
- Crew: 74 (1945).
- Sensors & processing systems: Radar: SO-1 (1945); CS (1966). Sonar: WEA-2 (1945); UNQ-1 (1966)
- Armament: 1 × 3-inch gun; 2 × 20mm/80 single-mount cannons; M2 Browning machine gun; 2 × depth charge tracks (1945)

The USCGC Walnut (WLM-252) was a steel-hulled, steam-powered twin-screw Hollyhock-class tender built for the Lighthouse Service in 1939 at Oakland, California. With the transfer of the Lighthouse Service to the Coast Guard in June, 1939, she was commissioned as a Coast Guard cutter on 8 July 1939.

== History ==
She served at Detroit, Michigan, into mid-1941 until she was transferred, as of 1 June 1941, to the 14th District and was based at Honolulu, Hawaii. She arrived there after undergoing a refit at the Coast Guard Yard. In Hawaii, she serviced aids to navigation in local waters and the waters around Midway Island and carried out search and rescue duties when required. She came under naval control in November 1941, when the United States drew closer to war. She was moored at Long Dock on Midway Island when a radio message was received indicating that Pearl Harbor was under attack. She immediately got underway and anchored in Midway Lagoon. A historical pamphlet noted:

"This was the day the WALNUT was to depart for Honolulu, but due to lack of fuel and being unarmed the WALNUT remained at anchor playing the role of Decoy in case any enemy craft should appear. For the rest of the day, the ship's crew worked quickly to extinguish all of the island's aids to navigation, for this was to be Midway's first of many evening black-outs. Then at 9:30 that evening, the first shot was heard. The enemy had arrived! The Japanese attack force consisted of two cruisers and one destroyer, which appeared to be circling the island, while they showered the island and lagoon with mortar shells. During the attack, a U.S. PBY Flying Boat crashed into Midway Lagoon. In response, the WALNUT'S crew immediately launched their small boat, manned by several members of the ship's crew. The small boat quickly arrived on the scene and rescued the plane's crew, two of whom had been seriously injured in the crash. Meanwhile, enemy shells were falling within 100 ft. of the WALNUT. The attack lasted approximately 30 minutes, and when it was over the ship and crew had endured without any casualties. The next two weeks were fairly quiet and work went on as usual. Due to prevailing circumstances, the WALNUT departed for Honolulu. One evening as the WALNUT approached their destination, an enemy submarine was sighted at a nearby island, which was on the ship's present course. Luckily, the WALNUT managed to slip past without being noticed and arrived safely in Honolulu."

Sometime in early 1942, she was classified as "miscellaneous tender" and given the hull number WAGL-252. By the spring of 1942, her armament comprised two 3-inch guns; four 20-millimeter Oerlikon machine guns; and two depth charge tracks. She spent the war in and around the Hawaiian Islands, servicing aids to navigation, search and rescue, and convoy "decoy" duties. In 1944, she was involved in the construction of a LORAN station on the Hawaiian Islands.

Resuming her peacetime pursuits with the Coast Guard after the cessation of hostilities, Walnut remained in the Hawaiian area until 31 August 1954. On 2 June 1953 she assisted the sampan Sunfish 18 miles south of Honolulu. From 8 to 9 March 1954 she searched for the ketch Novia between Hilo and Honolulu. She was modernized and converted from steam reciprocating to geared diesel drive by the Guy F. Atkinson Company d. b. a. Willamette Iron and Steel Company in Portland, Oregon beginning on 10 May 1954. After acceptance in late 1954 she transferred to the 7th Coast Guard District and was based out of Miami, Florida where she served until December, 1967.

On 3 July 1955 she towed the disabled M/V Antwerpen to San Juan, Puerto Rico. On 30 December 1956 she assisted the sinking yacht Melody. During February 1958 she patrolled the Miami to Nassau Race. On 14 June 1959 she assisted the M/V Johann Ahlers. On 25 November she assisted a disabled small craft. On 6 August 1960 she assisted the P/C Snow in the Old Bahama Channel. From 28 to 29 April 1961 she escorted the NASA Saturn barge Palaemon to Fort Pierce Inlet, Florida. From 15 to 16 November 1961 she searched for the missing ketch Blue Bell. From 12 to 13 March 1962 she assisted the M/V Flying Trader that was aground near the Matanilla Shoal. On 6 January 1963 she recovered a USAF drone 17 miles off Nassau. On 28 April 1963 she assisted the M/V Capri Koch which was aground northeast of Molasses Reef. On 1 September 1965 she collided with the M/V American Leader. On 4 October 1966 she unsuccessfully attempted to prevent the cutter Point Thatcher from grounding off Miami.

She transferred to San Pedro, California as of December, 1967. On 25 March 1968 she assisted following a collision between the M/Vs Atlantic Trader and Steel Designer two miles off Point Fermin, California. She played a "key role" in the experimental maintenance of deep water moorings using synthetic line instead of chain for floating aids. The Walnut was credited with having set the deepest Coast Guard aid to navigation, the San Pedro Channel Traffic Lane Buoy #7TL, which was moored in 2,700 feet of water off the coast of Southern California. On 12 March 1970 she set an Oceanographic Data Collection System (ODCS) buoy in the Pacific Missile Test Range for the Commander, Pacific Missile Range. During 1980 to 1982 she set weather information buoys for NOAA that provided information for offshore oil drilling off the coast of Southern California. On 4 March 1982 she fought a fire aboard a fishing vessel off Malibu, California.

By the time she was scheduled for decommissioning, she serviced the following "federal" aids to navigation: 76 lighted buoys, 50 unlighted buoys and 75 minor shore aids. She also serviced private aids: 520 lighted buoys and the aids on 33 off shore oil platforms. Walnut was decommissioned on 1 July 1982 and she was then transferred to the Honduran Navy.

The Walnut, in addition to carrying out ATON duties, saw considerable action in other venues, including fighting fires, assisting vessels in distress, recovering US Air Force drones, escorting a NASA barge that carried a stage of a Saturn V rocket, conducted SAR missions, and assisted in setting NOAA weather buoys.

== Decommissioning ==
The Walnut was decommissioned in 1982 and given to the Government of Honduras. She ended up as the Yojoa (FNH 252) for the Honduran Navy and was wrecked during Hurricane Mitch in 1998.

== Sources ==
US Coast Guard History.
