= Caterpillar C280 =

Overview
- Manufacturer: Caterpillar Incorporated

Layout
- Configuration: I6, I8, V12, V16
- Displacement: 18,500 cubic centimetres (1,129 in^{3}) per cylinder
- Cylinder bore: 280 millimetres (11.02 in)
- Piston stroke: 300 millimetres (11.81 in)
- Compression ratio: 15.3:1 (Propulsion); 12.6:1, 13:1 (Generator)

RPM range
- Idle speed: 250
- Max. engine speed: 1000

Combustion
- Turbocharger: Double or Quad
- Fuel system: Unit injection
- Management: Electronic
- Fuel type: Diesel
- Oil system: Wet sump
- Cooling system: Water cooled

Output
- Power output: up to 5,670 kilowatts (7,604 hp) @ 1000 rpm (marine/military rating)
- Torque output: 12,100 newton-metres (8,925 lbf⋅ft) @ 800 rpm

Dimensions
- Dry weight: up to 32.75 tonnes (32.233 long tons; 36.101 short tons)

Emissions
- Emissions target standard: EPA IV or IMO III
- Emissions control systems: Exhaust gas recirculation

Chronology
- Predecessor: Caterpillar 36 series engine

Caterpillar CG260

Overview
- Manufacturer: Caterpillar Incorporated

Layout
- Configuration: V12, V16
- Displacement: 18,000 cubic centimetres (1,098 in^{3}) per cylinder
- Cylinder bore: 260 millimetres (10.24 in)
- Piston stroke: 320 millimetres (12.60 in)
- Compression ratio: 12:1

RPM range
- Idle speed: 320
- Max. engine speed: 1000

Combustion
- Turbocharger: Quad
- Fuel system: Unit injection
- Management: Electronic
- Fuel type: Natural gas Biogas; Gasoline
- Oil system: Wet sump
- Cooling system: Water cooled

Output
- Power output: up to 4,500 kilowatts (6,035 hp) @ 1000 rpm (marine/military rating)
- Torque output: 10,700 newton-metres (7,892 lbf⋅ft) @ 850 rpm

Dimensions
- Dry weight: up to 32.75 tonnes (32.233 long tons; 36.101 short tons)

Emissions
- Emissions target standard: EPA IV or IMO III

Chronology
- Predecessor: Caterpillar 36 series engine

The Caterpillar C280 is a family of diesel internal combustion engines made by Caterpillar. The engine is 18.5 liters per cylinder in displacement. The cylinder size is 11.02 x 11.81 in. bore/stroke. The engine can produce 2400-7600 horsepower at 900 RPM. The peak torque occurs at an engine speed of 800 RPM. The Cat C280 is often used in locomotives and freight-class ships.
