= Tadiran Telecom =

Israeli telecommunications company

Tadiran Telecom, L.P. (TTL)
- Company type: Private
- Industry: Enterprise Communications
- Founded: 1963
- Headquarters: Petah Tikva, Israel
- Key people: Moshe Mitz, President & CEO
- Products: Business Communications Systems
- Website: International http://www.tadirantele.com

Tadiran Telecom (TTL) L.P., is a privately held Israeli Unified Communications and Collaboration (UC&C) company, providing UC&C systems globally. TTL is owned by Afcon Industries, which in turn is controlled by the Shlomo Group (TASE:SHLD), an Israeli corporation.

TTL's corporate headquarters are located in Petah Tikva (Israel), with regional offices located in Georgia (Atlanta), Beijing (China), and New Delhi (India).

The primary product offered by TTL is the Aeonix UC&C system.
