= Ituran =

Israeli company

Ituran Location and Control Ltd.
- Type: Public
- Traded as: Nasdaq: ITRN; TASE: ITRN
- Industry: Vehicle Tracking, Telematics
- Founded: 1994; 32 years ago
- Founder: Izzy Sheratzky, Yehuda Kahane
- Headquarters: Azor, Israel
- Area served: United States, Brazil, Argentina, Israel
- Products: Fleet management Systems, Real-time locating systems, Telematics systems
- Services: Stolen vehicle recovery, Vehicle tracking services, Location-based services
- Revenue: ▲US$ 182 million (2014)
- Operating income: ▲US$ 47.87 million (2014)
- Net income: ▲US$ 30.42 million (2014)
- Number of employees: 1,315
- Subsidiaries: Mapa Ltd. Ituran de Argentina S.A. Ituran Sistemas de Monitoramento Ltda. Ituran USA Holdings Inc. Cellutrak Canada Inc.
- Website: ituran.com

Ituran Location and Control Ltd. is an Israeli company that provides stolen vehicle recovery (SVR) and tracking services, and markets GPS wireless communications products. Ituran is traded on NASDAQ and is included in the TA-100 Index. Ituran has over 3,200 employees worldwide and is a market leader in Brazil, Argentina, Israel and the United States. As of June 2020, the company has more than 2M subscribers.

== History ==
Ituran was established in 1994 by the Tadiran conglomerate to develop and operate a service for locating stolen vehicles using a telematics technology that was originally developed for military use at Tadiran Telematics, a subsidiary of Tadiran Communications. The core technology, which relies on transmitting location and status data, was originally developed and licensed by Tadiran from Teletrac USA. Teletrac was founded as International Teletrac Systems in 1988. It received initial funding from a unit of AirTouch Communication (formerly known as Pacific Telesis) in exchange for 49% equity of the company. Teletrac contracted Tadiran to build base stations for their US system which were later used under license in deploying the network in Israel.

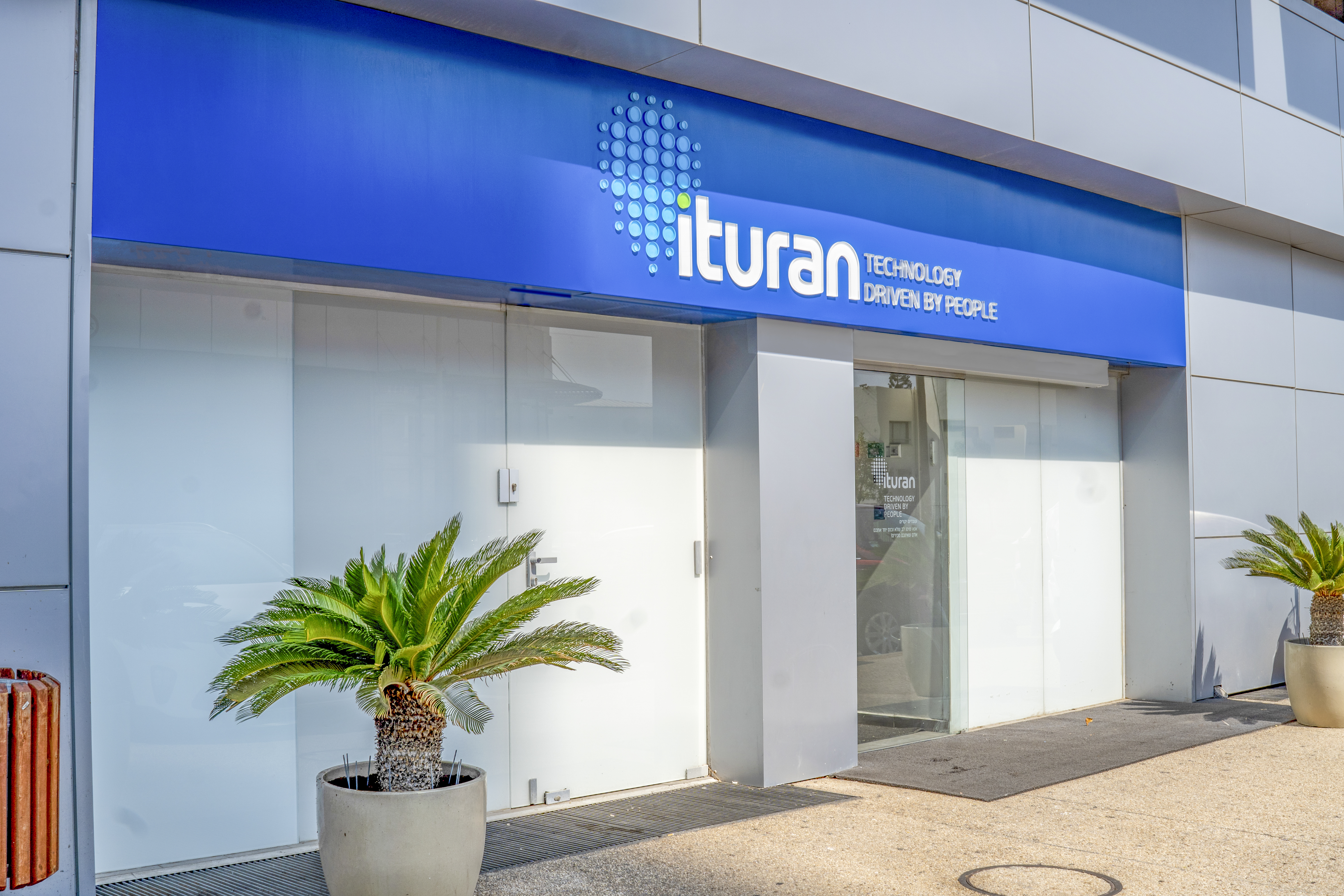

In 1995, Tadiran decided to sell the Ituran concept to a group of investors headed by Izzy Sheratzky.

In 1998, the company had an initial public offering on the Tel Aviv Stock Exchange, raising the capital required to develop the service overseas in the United States, Brazil and Argentina.

In November 1999, Ituran acquired Tadiran Telematics, which manufactured the tracking devices Ituran was using for its services, for $10 million. The acquisition enabled Ituran to reduce the cost of the systems it sold.

Ituran then changed their company's name to Telematics Wireless.

In 2005, Ituran raised approximately $50 million in an initial public offering on Nasdaq, which gave the company a value of $294 million.

In April 2007, Ituran acquired the Mapa group for $13 million. The Mapa Group consists of three divisions: geographical databases, map publishing in print and online, satellite navigation and location-based services.

In November 2007, Ituran sold Telematics Wireless to Singapore based ST Electronics, part of the ST Engineering corporation, for $90 million.

In 2011, Ituran signed an agreement with Pelephone which allows Ituran to use Pelephone's network to set up an MVNO (mobile virtual network operator) venture.

In 2012, Ituran announced that Ituran Brazil entered into agreement with General Motors Brazil ("GMB") through a company controlled by Ituran (51%). Ituran Brazil was founded in 1999 and has (as of the end of 2014) more than 310,000 active subscribers.

In May 2018, a severe security vulnerability was discovered in the Ituran system. The vulnerability allowed attackers to easily extract personal information of Ituran customers, including home addresses, phone numbers and car registration numbers. For some users it also allowed real-time tracking using the Ituran application. Following the discovery of the vulnerability, Ituran disabled the self-service portal for its Israeli customers, until the vulnerability is fixed.

== Mapa ==
Mapa - Mapping and Publishing (Hebrew: מפה - מיפוי והוצאה לאור, lit. map) is an Israeli cartographic and book publishing company, purchased in April 2007 by Ituran for $13 million.

Mapa was founded in 1985 under the name Sifrei Tel Aviv (lit. Tel Aviv Books). It entered the field of cartography in 1994. Mapa eventually moved solely into cartography, becoming the market leader in map making for the public sector in 1995. It controlled close to 80% of the map making market in 2005. Mapa has been expanding its horizons since 1996, and now publishes books in all fields. It also exports some books. Mapa's workforce consists of approximately 70 employees.

== See also ==
- Economy of Israel
- Vehicle tracking system
- Location-based service
- Telematics
