= Sa'ar 62-class offshore patrol vessel =

Type of boat

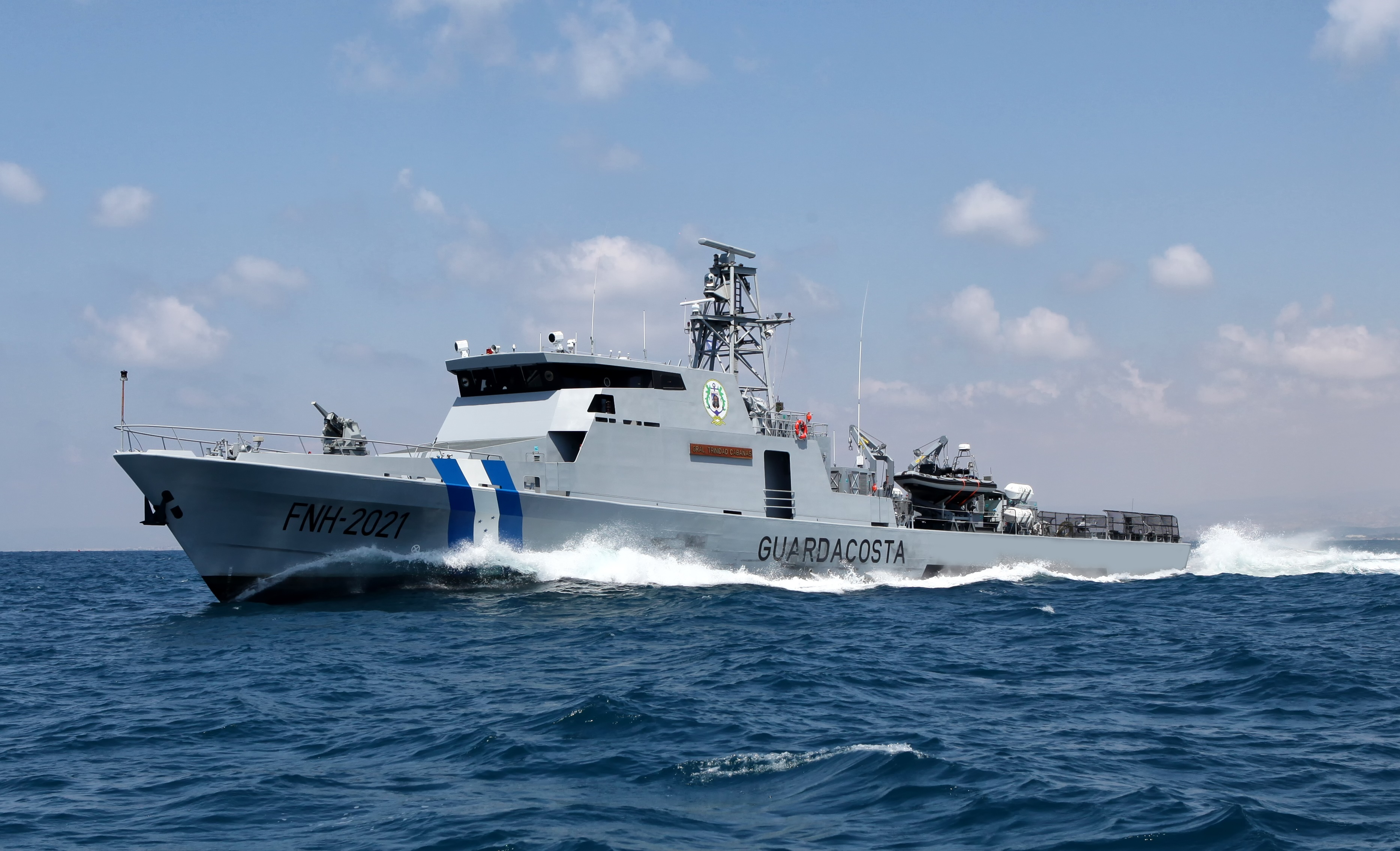
- General Cabañas, Honduran Navy vessel

Class overview
- Name: OPV 62m
- Builders: Israel Shipyards
- Operators: Navy of Equatorial Guinea; Azerbaijan Coast Guard; Cyprus Navy; Honduran Navy
- Built: 2009–present
- In commission: 2011–present
- Planned: 11
- Building: 1 (Cyprus)
- Completed: 10
- Active: Total 10: 2 (Equatorial Guinea); 6 (Azerbaijan); 1 (Cyprus); 1 (Honduras)
- Retired: 0

General characteristics
- Type: Offshore patrol vessel
- Displacement: 500 t (490 long tons)
- Length: 62 m (203 ft 5 in)
- Beam: 7.6 m (24 ft 11 in)
- Draft: 2.7 m (8 ft 10 in)
- Speed: 32 knots (59 km/h; 37 mph) max; 18–20 knots (33–37 km/h; 21–23 mph) cruising
- Range: 3,200 nmi (5,900 km; 3,700 mi) at 18 knots (33 km/h; 21 mph)
- Endurance: 14–20 days
- Complement: 20–30
- Sensors & processing systems: Furuno navigation radar; Rafael TopeLite electro-optical surveillance and observation and targeting system; IAI Elta surveillance and gunnery radar (SGRS) - ELM 2228X
- Electronic warfare & decoys: Rafael MRCR chaff/soft-kill countermeasures
- Armament: Rafael Typhoon RW ZU 23 mm naval gun; Rafael Typhoon MLS NLOS missile system; Remotely controlled 12.7 mm machine guns; Crew served 7.62 mm machine guns
- Aircraft carried: Airbus EC135 helicopter
- Aviation facilities: Flight deck

The Sa'ar 62-class offshore patrol vessel, commonly known as OPV 62m, is a type of vessel used by the Navy of Equatorial Guinea, the Cyprus Navy, the Azerbaijan Coast Guard, the Coastguard of Kazakhstan and the Honduran Navy. Designed by Israel Shipyards Ltd, these offshore patrol vessels are based on the Israeli Navy's Sa'ar 4.5-class missile boat. The boats are closely related to the approximately 400 ton Sa'ar 4-derived OPV 58m, known as the Fournoi-class in Hellenic Coast Guard service.

== Design ==
The patrol craft have a simple design, but are equipped with modern sensors, systems and weapons. The vessels armament gives them the capability to engage surface, air, and land threats and targets, and the countermeasure system can give them protection from anti-ship missiles and torpedoes. The vessels can deploy small boats for boarding operations, and search and rescue. The vessels have a 7 by 7.7 metre flight deck for an Airbus EC135 helicopter that can be used to assist the vessel in its missions.

== Orders ==
In 2009, Equatorial Guinea contracted Israel Shipyards to build two OPV 62m vessels, Kié-Ntem and Litoral. These boats were commissioned in March 2011.

The Azerbaijan Coast Guard, officially the maritime brigade of the State Border Service of Azerbaijan, ordered six OPV 62m to be built locally on the Caspian Sea. The vessels were constructed at Azerbaijan Coast Guard's Ship Construction and Repair Center in Türkan. The first, pennant number S-201, was launched on 9 September 2015. The vessels are heavily armed for their size, including an 8-cell MLS-NLOS launcher firing Spike-NLOS missiles.

The Cypriot Navy ordered an OPV 62m in December 2015 for the purpose of protecting the Exclusive Economic Zone of Cyprus. The completed vessel was officially launched by Israel Shipyards in September 2017, before being commissioned into the service of the Cypriot Navy as the Commodore Andreas Ioannides (P61) in January 2018. The vessel is named as a memorial to Andreas Ioannides, a former Commander of the Cyprus Navy.

The Honduran Navy ordered an OPV 62m in 2016. The patrol boat, named General José Trinidad Cabañas (FNH2021), was delivered in December 2019. The vessel is named after José Trinidad Cabañas, a former president of Honduras. The General Cabañas is intended to combat drug trafficking, as well as render humanitarian aid in emergencies. The patrol vessel features a new modernized superstructure compared to previous boats in the series.

On 26 October 2026, the governments of Cyprus and Israel signed a deal for the purchase of a second OPV 62m for the Cyprus Navy. The deal includes an upgrade of systems aboard the existing vessel, Commodore Andreas Ioannides.

== Vessels in class ==
Name / Pennant	Built For	Commissioned	Status	Image
Kié-Ntem	Navy of Equatorial Guinea	March 2011	Active	
Litoral	Navy of Equatorial Guinea	March 2011	Active	
S-201	Azerbaijan Coast Guard	November 2015	Active	
S-202	Azerbaijan Coast Guard	2016	Active	
S-203	Azerbaijan Coast Guard	2017	Active	
S-204	Azerbaijan Coast Guard		Active	
S-205	Azerbaijan Coast Guard	2018	Active	
S-206	Azerbaijan Coast Guard	2019	Active	
Commodore Andreas Ioannides (P61)	Cyprus Navy	January 2018	Active	
General José Trinidad Cabañas (FNH2021)	Honduran Navy	December 2019	Active	
	Cyprus Navy		Under construction	

== See Also ==
- Israeli patrol craft
  - Shaldag-class patrol boat - produced by Israel Shipyards
  - Dabur-class patrol boat - produced by IAI-Ramta
  - Dvora-class fast patrol boat - produced by IAI-Ramta
  - Super Dvora Mk II-class patrol boat - produced by IAI-Ramta
  - Super Dvora Mk III-class patrol boat - produced by IAI-Ramta
  - Protector USV - USV produced by Rafael Advanced Defense Systems
  - Silver Marlin - USV produced by Elbit Systems
