= Shlomo Group =

Investment and holdings Group

- Native name: קבוצת שלמה
- Type: Public
- Industry: Holding Real estate Energy Communications Car dealership Insurance Shipyards Logistics
- Founded: 1974; 52 years ago
- Founder: Shlomo Shmeltzer
- Successor: Asi Shmeltzer
- Headquarters: Tzrifin, Israel
- Key people: Asi Shmeltzer (chairman)
- Subsidiaries: Shlomo Insurance, Afcon Holdings, Israel Shipyards, Gold Bond
- Website: https://www.shlomo.co.il/group/

Shlomo Group (Hebrew: קבוצת שלמה) is one of the largest investments and holdings groups in Israel, consists of automotive, real estate, telecom, insurance, shipyards and logistics sectors. The group was founded in 1974 by Shlomo Shmeltzer. The group's consolidated turnover is amounted to ILS 7 billion, as of 2017. Today the company is headed by Asi Shmeltzer, the son of Shlomo Shmeltzer who was the company's founder, while his wife Atalia Shmeltzer acts as the group's owner.

== History ==
=== 20th century ===
The group was founded in 1974 as a car rental company. In 1983 her shares were signed Tel Aviv Stock Exchange.

In 1990 Gold Bond/Conterm joined the group. Gold Bond is specializing in the sectors of containers storage and transportation, and in providing cargo logistics solutions. In 1991 the group has founded its first logistic center, "Shlomo Car Rental", in Petah Tikva. In 1995, the Group participated in the acquisition of Israel Shipyards.

=== 21st century ===
In 2002 the group bought the license for handling the operation of Sixt in Israel and in 2003 acquired the "Afcon" holding group, which is traded on the Tel Aviv Stock Exchange and specializing in the sectors of infrastructure, electromechanical systems, control and automation, and communication. In 2005 the group's activity was expanded outside of Israel through the establishment of Shlomo Romania where it provides car lease, rental and sale services. In 2007, Shlomo Real Estate was added to the group and in 2008 Shlomo Insurance was founded.

In 2011 the group was granted a franchise for importing the German car brand Opel through Opel Israel. That same year the group relocated it HQ to Tzrifin, to "Kyriat Shlomo" service and logistics center. In 2014 the company was supposed to acquire Sonol from Azrieli Group, but the sale was cancelled following the death of Shlomo Shmeltzer and the perish of David Azrieli the day after. After the death of Shlomo, his son Asi Shmeltzer was appointed as the chairman of the group.

In 2015 the group won the sponsorship tender for the name of the Drive in Arena, officially named Shlomo Group Arena. In 2017 Shlomo Group acquired the business activity of the Chinese company BYD Auto and began importing cars and electric buses. In 2018 group had founded the Shlomo Shmeltzer Institute for Smart Transportation at Tel Aviv University, in the founder's memory.

== Group Structure ==
=== S. Shlomo Holdings ===
A holding company which provinces car services for government, public, private and business customers. The company own a fleet of 80,000 vehicles, and provide those services through its subsidiaries.

- Operating Leasing - The largest leasing company in Israel. holds 25% of the leasing market with a fleet of 54,000 long lease vehicles. The company has 3,500 business customers, mostly in food, industrial, high-tech and public sectors
- Private Leasing – The Group's serves its 20,000 customers since 2009, and had 32% of the private leasing market in Israel.
- Car Rental – Shlomo Group holds about 21% market share in Israel with a fleet of 13,000 vehicles for rent and 29 car rental stations across Israel. Shlomo Group is also an exclusive Israeli franchisee of the international rental company – SIXT, which has representation in 105 countries around the world with 2,200 rental stations. In 2019 the group launched a car-sharing services with "Shlomo Sixt Share".
- Garage and Tow Chain – Shlomo Group provides all sorts of road services, such as a chain of garages with 400 service stations, towing and car repairs. Over 300,000 customers are subscribed the roadside recovery service operated by the Group.
- First hand car sale – Another activity of Shlomo Group in this sector is first hand car sale. The Group operates a 37-point of sale system across Israel and reports 25,000 car sales per year, which are around 25% of the market share in this segment.
- Franchisee of BYD Auto in Israel and Germany

In June 2018 Shlomo Group acquired the Israeli and the Romanian franchise of the Chinese company BYD Auto, a multinational company, that was established in Shenzhen province, China. Since its establishment in 1995, BYD Auto has developed an expertise in rechargeable batteries. In 2016, it sold 114,315 new electric vehicles, an increase of 70% from the previous year, that is higher than the average growth rate of new electric vehicles sold in China (about 53%). BYD Auto has successfully expanded renewable energy solutions all around the world while operating in more than 50 countries and regions. After 23 years of development, BYD has created a net-Zero Emissions Energy system, affordable solar power and a reliable energy storage system as part of encouraging advanced electric transportation plans. BYD is traded on the Shenzhen and Hong Kong Stock Exchange.

In Israel, Shlomo Group distributes a 12 meters long electric buses for the transit operator Egged. In the future, additional electric vehicles types are expected to arrive to Israel, such as 18 meters long buses, minibuses and passenger cars.

=== Shlomo Insurance ===
In November 2007 Shlomo Group was granted a license from The Supervisor of Insurance and at the beginning of 2008 established its business activity. The Group has 380,000 customers and 1,000 active insurance agents. According to the company's publications, its investment portfolio value amounts at ILS 900 million.

In 2019 the company launched "AppToYou" - a service which measures the distance a driver had traveled and the safety of his driving, and fit the insurance policy by these paremeters.

=== Afcon Holdings ===
Shlomo Group is a controlling shareholder (62%) of Afcon. Afcon provides a range of products and services for infrastructures and technologies to a variety of companies in the Israeli market. Afcon was founded in 1945 and now employs 1,250 people. Afcon is traded on the Tel Aviv Stock Exchange at a value of NIS 500 million and its shareholders' equity is ILS 400 million. In 2015 the company's profits reached ILS 1.4 billion. Afcon operates worldwide, including Romania, China, India, the United States and Russia. Afcon has also a construction division, partnering the establishment of Intel international R&D center at Petah Tikva.

=== Shlomo Real Estate ===
Shlomo Nadlan, owns 500,000 sqm. of properties in Israel and Western Europe, it was established in 2007 and specializes in real estate activities. Shlomo Real Estate core business is improving assets, including hotels and commercial properties. The company acquire properties and improve them through renovation, locating suitable tenants, etc. Some of the properties are sold and some are used for rental purposes. The value of the company's asset portfolio amounts at ILS 2 billion and shareholders' equity is estimated at NIS 600 million.

=== Israel Shipyards ===
Israel Shipyards operates in the military and the civilian markets, including import and export logistics service. Israel Shipyards is the largest shipyard in Israel and one of the largest privately owned shipyards in the Middle East, in addition it is the first and only private port in Israel. The company's facilities and offices are located in the eastern part of Kishon Port in Haifa Bay, covering 335 dunams leased from the Administration of Shipping and Ports. The company has a 900 meters length pier with a waterside depth of 12 meters. Since September 2020 it became a public company.

=== Gold Bond ===
Gold Bond, which is owned by Shlomo Group, is actually a holding group consists of a number of companies, and most of its activity is located in Ashdod area, including the following fields of activity:

- Container Terminal: providing terminal service and storage of full containers for import and export, including refrigerated containers, empty containers and more.
- Freight Terminal: absorption of empty containers, unload and empty containers, split their cargo according to customers and more.
- Logistics activity: storage service for containers and cargo after customs clearance, cargo handling, unload containers and additional logistics service (including freight transportation).
- Lease of storage spaces and warehouses.

Gold Bond owns a railway station enabling transportation of cargo and goods from Ashdod to all over Israel.

== International Business Activity ==
In addition to Israel, a major focus of the group's business activity is in Romania. Shlomo Group is one of the two largest car rental companies in Romania today. It holds the largest market share of car rental and leasing in Romania, and also, an importer and franchisee of Opel in Bucharest. The core business of the group is first hand car sale.

== Criticism ==
Shlomo Group was mentioned due to a fine in totaling ILS 1,549,100, that was imposed in 2013 on several vehicle importers, including Shlomo Group. According to the Ministry of Environmental Protection the companies did not publish air pollution level data of the vehicles. The notification of the Ministry of Environmental Protection noted this is not the first time Shlomo Group is fined for such kind of violation.

== See also ==
- Economy of Israel
