= Navy of Equatorial Guinea =

- Marina de guerra Marine de guerre Marinha de Guerra
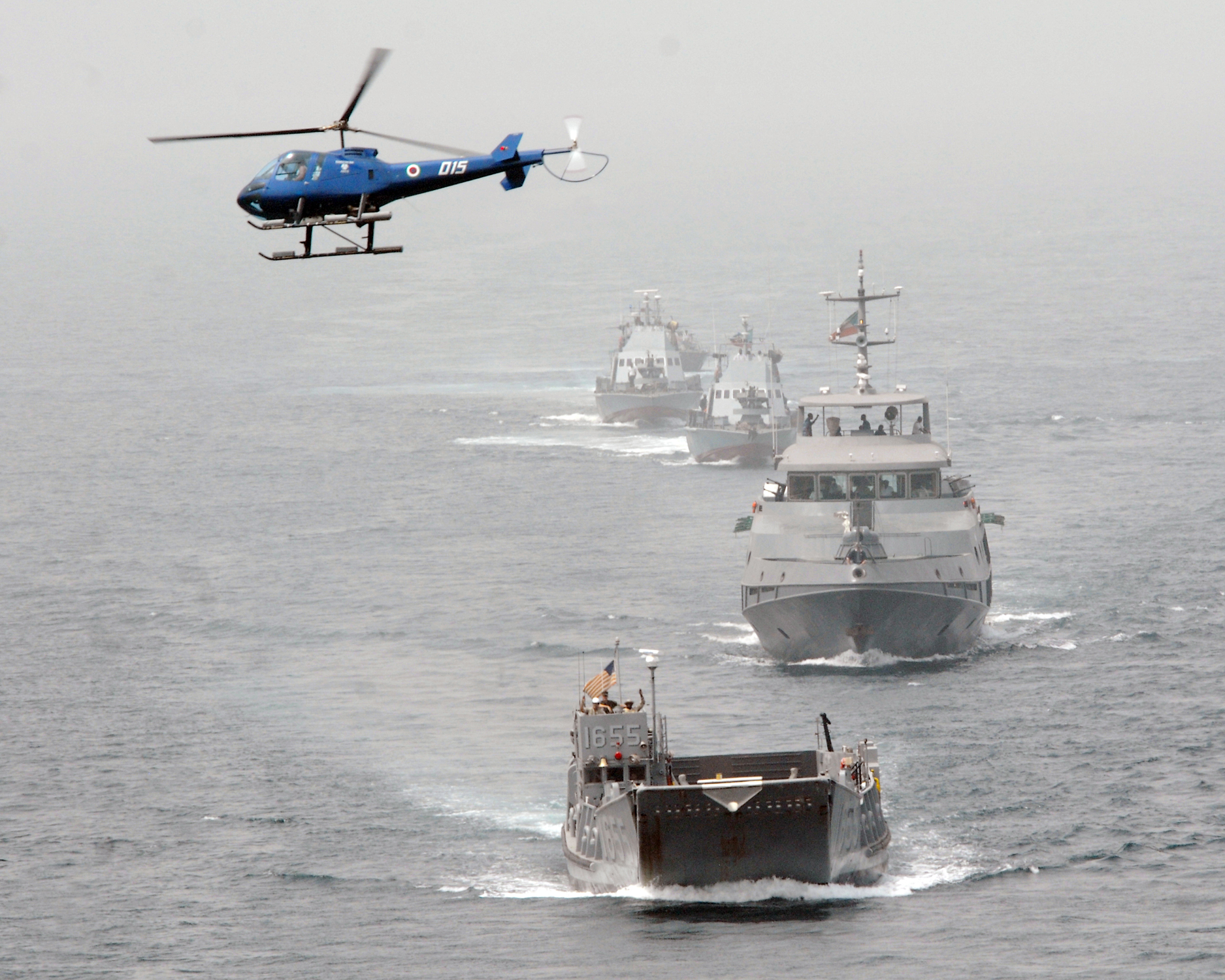
- Joint U.S.- Equatorial Guinea naval exercises off the coast of Equatorial Guinea on February 2, 2008. Behind the American landing craft 1655 sail three Guinean patrol boats, the first being the patrol boat Daphne and the other two being Isla de Corisco and Isla de Annobon.
- Country: Equatorial Guinea
- Branch: Navy
- Role: Protection of waters of Equatorial Guinea
- Size: 200 active personnel
- Part of: Armed Forces of Equatorial Guinea
- Garrison/HQ: Malabo; Bata
- Equipment: 1 frigate 1 corvette 1 dock landing ship 10 patrol Craft

Insignia
- Ensign

The Navy of Equatorial Guinea (Spanish: Marina de guerra; French: Marine de guerre; Portuguese: Marinha de Guerra) is the maritime component of the Armed Forces of Equatorial Guinea. Its main functions are anti-piracy operations in the Gulf of Guinea and protecting the offshore oil and gas assets of the nation. The Navy has around 200 personnel.

== Overview ==
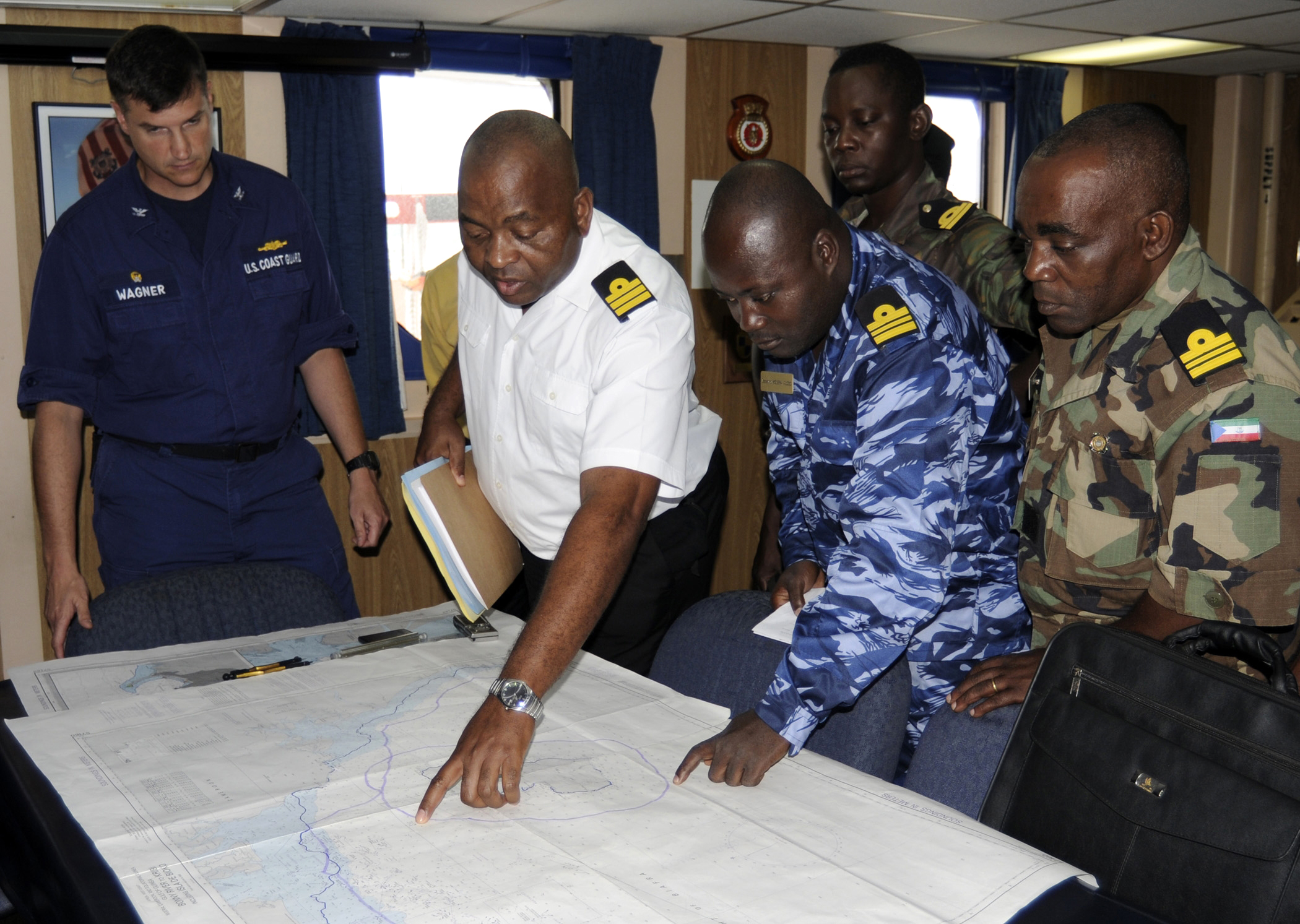
Members of the Equatorial Guinea Navy go over plans for a mock boarding during an exercise with the US Navy in 2008.

The Navy safeguards the 296 km maritime border of Equatorial Guinea. Its main purpose is to protect the nation's oil assets and prevent piracy in the Gulf of Guinea. The Russian and American navies have joint exercises with the Equatoguinean navy, besides the Obangame Express exercise in the Gulf of Guinea with 10 other nations. The navy is also used to patrol the Corisco bay islands which are claimed by both Equatorial Guinea and Gabon.

The Navy partially built a 107-m long frigate, the Wele Nzas, in the dry dock in Malabo. The frigate was commissioned on June 3, 2014, by president Teodoro Obiang Nguema Mbasogo and named after the Wele-Nzas Province. The ship was designed in Mykolaiv, Ukraine and built at Varna, Bulgaria. The outfitting was done at Malabo. The Wele Nzas was designated as the flagship of the Navy.

The United States donated a 68-foot patrol boat, the Isla de Bioko (no longer operational) to the navy in 1988 to patrol its Exclusive Economic Zone. The Equatoguineans rely mainly on foreigners to operate the navy equipment it buys from foreign militaries.

== Ships and boats ==
=== Frigates ===
- Wele Nzas, procured from Bulgaria and outfitted in Malabo.

=== Corvettes ===
- Bata (OPV-88). 1,360 tonnes, 76mm gun main armament.

=== Dock landing ships ===
- Osa, of Salamandra-class. Spanish made, it was delivered by China in 2009.

=== Patrol boats ===
- Two Shaldag-class fast patrol boats, named Isla de Corisco and Isla de Annobon.
- Two OPV 62, named after Kié-Ntem Province and Litoral Province. Delivered by Israel in 2011
- Two Ex-Ukrainian Kalkan-class offshore patrol vehicles.
- Two Patrol Vehicle-50M patrol craft, acquired in 2008 from Bulgaria. One is named Estuario del Muni.
