= National Unity Movement of Equatorial Guinea =

Political party in Equatorial Guinea (1959–1970)

National Unity Movement of Equatorial Guinea Movimiento de Unión Nacional de Guinea Ecuatorial
- Abbreviation: MUNGE
- President: Bonifacio Ondó Edú
- Founder: Bonifacio Ondó Edú
- Founded: 1959
- Banned: 19 January 1970
- Split from: National Liberation Movement of Equatorial Guinea
- Headquarters: Equatorial Guinea and Gabon
- Ideology: Nationalism; Conservatism; Francoism; Panhispanism; Independentism; Neocolonialism
- Political position: Right-wing to far-right
- Colors: Dark blue

The National Unity Movement of Equatorial Guinea (Spanish: Movimiento de Unión Nacional de Guinea Ecuatorial, MUNGE) was a political party in Equatorial Guinea, founded as one of the main independence movements in Spanish Guinea. It was also the most important political force during the period of autonomy, between 1964 and 1968.

== History ==
=== Beginnings ===
The MUNGE had its origins in the Popular Union for the Liberation of Equatorial Guinea (UPLGE), a conservative organization founded in 1959 by the independence leader Bonifacio Ondó Edú from his exile in Libreville, with the support of the Gabonese government of Léon M'ba. The UPLGE had emerged from a split in the National Liberation Movement of Equatorial Guinea (Monalige). It had significant support in the southeastern part of the Spanish Guinean territory.

=== Autonomous government ===
After Bonifacio Ondó returned to the territory in 1963, he transformed the UPLGE into the National Unity Movement of Equatorial Guinea (MUNGE) in November of that year. Shortly afterwards, the territory's autonomy was approved, and Bonifacio Ondó became the president of the Autonomous Government from 1964. Upon formally establishing itself as a political party, it formed centers of activity in almost all the localities of Spanish Guinea.

On 11 January 1964, elections were held to renew Neighborhood Councils, City Councils, and Provincial Councils, as well as to constitute the first autonomous General Assembly. Only MUNGE participated in the elections.

During the autonomous regime, the MUNGE was a far-right party aligned with the Francoist regime and espoused a nationalist ideology. It found support among conservative, law-and-order-oriented people. It also received support from Guineans closer to the administration (such as civil servants, traditional chiefs, and generally older people), loggers, the Catholic Church, and settlers, especially Spanish landowners. The MUNGE's alignment with the ideology of the FET y de las JONS led to its rapid recognition by the Francoist regime. The MUNGE was a moderate nationalist party that supported Spain's reformist policies, and endorsed Spanish influence on the "civilization" of the native people. It advocated maintaining ties with Spain and establishing a non-immediate "associated independence" with that country.

Its closeness to the Francoist regime led to the discreditation among the Guinean population, as the autonomous institutions were politically limited and unable to address the demands for freedom from exiled nationalists and the widespread discontent of the Guinean people. This led members of the MUNGE, such as the Vice President of the Autonomous Government, Francisco Macías Nguema, to join more radical movements like the Monalige. However, towards the end of the Autonomous Government, the MUNGE radicalized its positions and advocated for independence.

=== Independence and outlawing ===
It participated in the Constitutional Conference (1967–1968) that drafted the 1968 Constitution of Equatorial Guinea and advocated for its approval in the August 1968 constitutional referendum. In the September 1968 general elections, the MUNGE nominated Bonifacio Ondó as its presidential candidate, with the support of the Spanish Prime Minister's Office. Ondó received 34.94% of the vote, finishing second to Francisco Macías Nguema, the candidate of the Popular Idea of Equatorial Guinea (IPGE). In the parliamentary elections held on the same day, the MUNGE won 10 seats in the National Assembly. In the second round, Ondó received 37.65% of the vote, losing to Macías.

Following the independence of Equatorial Guinea, some members of the MUNGE assumed positions in the country's new administration (such as Minister of Education José Nsue and Minister of Finance Andrés Ikuga), although the party was generally isolated. Its leader, Bonifacio Ondó, who was due to become the Leader of the Opposition in the National Assembly, went into exile in Gabon. Shortly afterward, he was forced to return to Equatorial Guinea, and during the 1969 diplomatic crisis between Spain and Equatorial Guinea, he was placed under house arrest and later imprisoned in the Black Beach prison. Party members and supporters also began to be arrested in December 1968. The Attorney General was dismissed by the government on 30 December after denouncing the illegitimacy of these actions. During the next two months, MUNGE militants and supporters suffered constant persecution and street attacks.

Following the attempted coup in March 1969 and the establishment of a dictatorial regime by Macías, Ondó and several leaders of the MUNGE were assassinated.

On 19 January 1970, the MUNGE was outlawed along with the other existing parties after Macías established the United National Workers' Party (PUNT) as the sole legal party and initiated a dictatorial regime that would last until the 1979 coup d'état.
