= Edmundo Bossio =

Equatoguinean politician (1922–1975)

1st Vice President of Equatorial Guinea
- In office 12 October 1968 – 2 March 1974
- President: Francisco Macías Nguema
- Preceded by: Position established
- Succeeded by: Miguel Eyegue

Procurator of the Cortes Españolas
- In office 1967–1971
- President: Antonio Iturmendi Bañales; Alejandro Rodríguez de Valcárcel
- Constituency: Provincial Deputation of Fernando Poo

Personal details
- Born: Edmundo Bossio Dioko; 22 November 1922 Rebola, Fernando Poo Province, Spanish Guinea (now Equatorial Guinea)
- Died: 21 February 1975 (aged 52) Black Beach Prison, Malabo, Equatorial Guinea
- Party: United National Workers' Party
- Other political affiliations: Bubi Union (1967–1970)
- Awards: Grand Cross of the Order of Civil Merit (1968)

Edmundo Bossio Dioko (Note: Sometimes spelled Edmundo Bosio Dioco. Also sometimes known as Edmundo Dioco Bosio.) (22 November 1922 – 21 February 1975) was an Equatoguinean farmer and politician, first Vice President of Equatorial Guinea after the independence of the country. He was characterized by the defense of the interests of the Bubi sociocultural group.

== Biography ==
He was born on 22 November 1922 in Rebola on Fernando Poo Island, where he began his primary studies to later graduate as a primary school teacher. In his youth he was assigned to the Río Muni Province to practice his profession in different locations, where he would also graduate in teaching. After his return to Fernando Poo, he dedicated much of his time to competing with the Spanish landowners in the exploitation of his family's cocoa plantations, to which he joined others on a lease basis.

In October 1962, he was awarded the Silver Medal of the Order of Africa by Luis Carrero Blanco.

Between August 1966 and April 1967 he became one of the main representatives of Bubi nationalism, as president of the Agrarian Chamber of Fernando Poo, while performing the function of procurator in the Cortes Españolas, since in the elections held in the Fernando Poo Province on 16 November 1967 he obtained 4,125 votes out of 6,731 cast. He participated in the Constitutional Conference (1967–1968) that drafted the 1968 Constitution of Equatorial Guinea.

He led the formation of the group Bubi Union, which later became a political party, with which he obtained 5,000 votes in the first round of the September 1968 presidential elections.

Supporter of the self-determination of Bioko Island or, failing that, of its integration as a state within a federation, he nevertheless supported the IPGE party of Francisco Macías Nguema against its main adversary, the MUNGE party of Bonifacio Ondó Edú.

He was the first vice president of the recently formed Republic of Equatorial Guinea, taking office on 12 October 1968. He maintained a strong friendship with President Macías. After the establishment of the dictatorship in 1969, Bossio did not suffer any type of retaliation. He frequently took charge of government functions when Macías traveled outside the country.

On 2 March 1974, Bossio was removed from office and replaced by Miguel Eyegue.

At the end of 1974, he was investigated by the Information Services (after an official portrait of Macías posted on the door of his home was destroyed) and subjected to house arrest. According to allegations by the Guinean opposition in exile, the portrait incident was actually orchestrated by regime officials. Bossio was arrested and summarily executed in the Black Beach prison on 21 February 1975. His death was officially justified as a suicide by barbiturate overdose.

== Notes ==
Political offices
New title	Vice President of Equatorial Guinea; 1968–1974	Succeeded by Miguel Eyegue
