= 1963 Spanish Guinean autonomy referendum =

- 15 December 1963
- Do you ratify with your vote the basis on the autonomous regime of Equatorial Guinea?

Results
Choice	Votes	%
Yes	59,280	62.52%
No	35,537	37.48%

A referendum on autonomy from Spain was held in Spanish Guinea on 15 December 1963. The result was 62.52% in favour. The result was considered a step towards independence from Spain, which was achieved in 1968.

== History ==
The push for some degree of self-rule in Spanish Guinea was a slowly developing process with multiple sources, both internal and external.

=== The evolving relationship with Spain ===
In 1959, partly due to international pressure for decolonization, Spain began to reform the political structure of Spanish Guinea. Previously considered a territory of Spain, Spanish Guinea was reclassified as a region of Spain, ostensibly on par with the European mainland. This formally gave the Guineans equal rights with European Spaniards, though it also reinforced the second-class status of Guinean self-governance compared to the European Spanish regions by placing the region under the direct control of the Spanish Presidency.

From the Spanish perspective, the hope was to keep Spanish Guinea within Spanish control by strengthening the apparent ties between European Spain and Spanish Guinea, both governmentally and culturally. They were partly inspired by Portugal's successful reduction of international pressure to release its colonies by treating them as integral parts of their country. Spanish Guinea was granted seats within the Cortes, the Spanish assembly, in December 1960, finally granting the colony a measure of direct representation within Spain.

However, the process of changing the relationship between Spain and Spanish Guinea also led to a surge of nationalist organization among the people of Spanish Guinea. This was not entirely new; in 1947 and 1950, groups of emancipados (the highest social class native Guineans could hold) had presented their complaints to the Spaniards, and protests simmered throughout the 1950s.

Spain responded by tightening its grip, even as it seemed to be decolonizing. The leaders of these nationalist movements were mostly exiled, killed, or disappeared after clashes between the colonial forces and Guineans. The Spanishness of Spanish Guinea was considered paramount and enforced with an iron fist; one Spanish administrator announced in 1959 that "I will not hesitate to sign the death sentence of any unfortunate person who threatens the dignity of Spain, [...] I will order anyone who violates the Spanishness of these lands to be shot".

=== Proposing a new autonomous regime ===
The United Nations remained unconvinced that Spanish Guinea was self-governing or decolonized in a meaningful sense. In addition, the exiled Guinean nationalists, sheltered in neighboring Gabon and Cameroon, continued agitating for independence. They gained attention not only within Africa but also at the UN, further increasing pressure on Spain. This led the Francoist government to change tactics, adopting a new plan modeled more on the British and French colonial models, rather than the Portuguese.

The Spanish Council of Ministers drafted a new set of laws known as the Ley de Bases sobre el Régimen de Autónomo (Basic Law of the Autonomous Regime). These laws partially undid the 1959 reforms. They reunited the provinces of Fernando Po (composed of Bioko and other islands) and the mainland of Río Muni, which had been treated as separate provinces of Spain, into a single entity of Equatorial Guinea. Old colonial institutions were reworked with quasi-representative structures. For instance, the governor-general of the colony was renamed as the High Commissioner, and was retained expansive powers that limited the power of the new "autonomous" legislative and governing councils that the law created. After quickly passing through the Cortes, the law was ready to be presented to the Guineans to be approved by a referendum. As part of the increased democracy that was intended to accompany the autonomous regime, exiled nationalists began to return from Cameroon and Gabon, after the authorities promised that political movements could hold meetings and their leaders would not be punished.

== Results ==
Popular opinion on the proposed autonomous regime was split. The nationalists generally viewed it as a key step toward independence. Nationalist movements including the UPLGE (Unión Popular de Liberación de Guinea Ecuatorial) and the MONALIGE (Movimiento Nacional de Liberación de Guinea Ecuatorial) supported the law. The IPGE, though, was split, with the bulk of the movement opposing it. The regional authorities favored the new law, but the bourgeoisie favored the status quo.

Approximately half of the eligible voters participated in the referendum, which passed with 62.5% approval. The island of Bioko (Fernando Poo), the more developed and Hispanicized portion of the colony, voted down the law by a 57-43% margin. However, the far more populous mainland region heavily favored the law, resulting in the adoption of the new autonomous regime.

Choice	Votes	%
For	59,280	62.52
Against	35,537	37.48
Total	94,817	100.00

== Aftermath ==
The Autonomous Regime was short-lived, as Equatorial Guinea would declare independence in 1968, a mere five years later.

Bonifacio Ondó Edú, the leader of the UPLGE movement, became the head of the governing council via indirect elections in early 1964. Ondó Edú organized a new political group, MUNGE, which combined the moderate nationalists and status-quo colonialists. The other nationalist movements, MONALIGE and IPGE, stayed largely outside the government and maintained a more radical stance. By 1966, political differences had magnified, but virtually all Equatoguineans agreed that the regime was untenable and independence was both necessary and inevitable.

In 1966, the United Nations Special Committee on Decolonization sent delegates to Spanish Guinea to assess whether the Regime of Autonomy reflected the will of the Guineans and whether it represented true self-governance. The committee's report after the visit questioned the legitimacy of the Regime of Autonomy and noted that the desire for independence was essentially unanimous, and the debate was only over the speed with which it should be given. The committee's report proposed that independence be planned no later than July 1968.

The independence referendum occurred in late 1968, approving a new constitution for an independent democratic Equatorial Guinea. Elections were held later that year, and Ondó Edú lost the presidential election to Francisco Macías Nguema. The independent constitutional government was even shorter-lived than the autonomous regime; Macías consolidated power into a one-party state by 1971.
