= Bonifacio Ondó Edú =

Prime Minister of Equatorial Guinea (1922–1969)

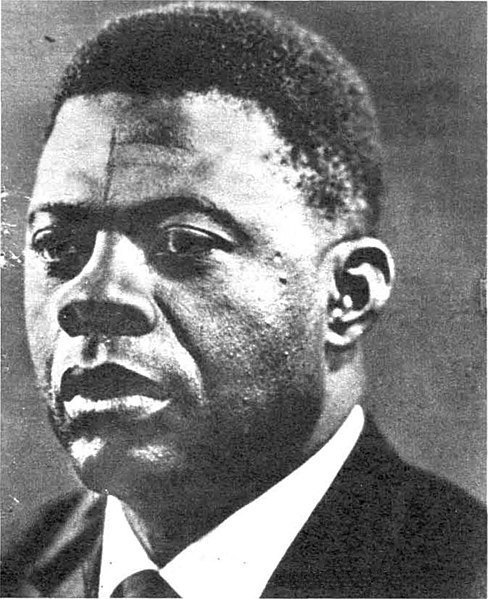
- Presidential campaign photo, 1968

Prime Minister of Spanish Guinea
- In office 1 January 1964 – 12 October 1968
- Deputy: Francisco Macías Nguema
- Preceded by: Position established
- Succeeded by: Cristino Seriche Bioko as Prime Minister of Equatorial Guinea (Note: Following the independence of Spanish Guinea in 1968 and the presidential election that year, the country was renamed and the position of prime minister was abolished. President Teodoro Obiang Nguema Mbasogo reestablished the office in 1982 as Prime Minister of Equatorial Guinea, with Seriche Bioko in the position.)

Personal details
- Born: 19 March 1922 Evinayong, Spanish Guinea, (now Equatorial Guinea)
- Died: 5 March 1969 (aged 46) Black Beach Prison, Malabo, Equatorial Guinea
- Party: UPLGE (1959–1963); MUNGE (from 1963)
- Spouse: Edelvina Oyana
- Awards: Grand Cross of the Order of Isabella The Catholic (1968)

Bonifacio Ondó Edú-Aguong (19 March 1922 – 5 March 1969) was an Equatoguinean politician who served as the Prime Minister of Equatorial Guinea from 1964 to 1968 while it was still under Spanish colonial rule, as Spanish Guinea. He played a leading role in the country's independence, and led the National Unity Movement of Equatorial Guinea from 1959 until his death.

He took office when the country gained autonomy in 1964, and ran in the country's first presidential election in 1968, losing in the run-off. He handed power over to the newly elected president Francisco Macías Nguema on 12 October 1968 (the day of independence). He was imprisoned and officially committed suicide only a few months later. Another account says he returned in 1969 from exile in Gabon and was killed.

== Biography ==
=== Early and personal life ===
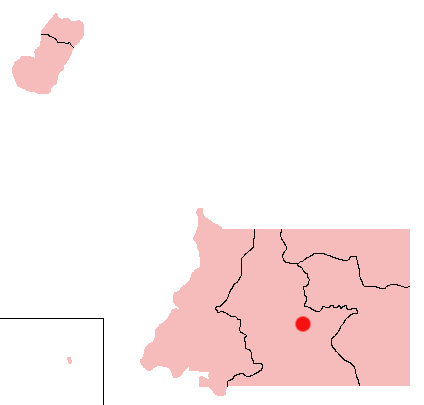
Evinayong, Ondó Edú's hometown

Bonifacio Ondó Edú-Aguong, a member of the Fang people, was born in either 1920 or 1922, (Note: Sources disagree on his date and year of birth. El Mundo says 1920 without specifying a date. Association France-Guinée Equatoriale cites 5 June 1920, while AhoraEG and Augusto Iyanga Pendi state 1922 without a date.) in Evinayong, Río Muni, in what was then Spanish Guinea. He was a member of the Nsomo clan, which also included Enrique Nvo. Ondó Edú married Edelvina Oyana, also a member of the Fang people, and the two were the parents of a large family. Ondó Edú has been described as "of profound religious-Catholic convictions."

During the 1950s, emerging groups of African nationalists began pushing for independence from Spain. However, after the murder of several independence leaders such as Nvo and Acacio Mañé Ela and the arrests of 24 others in 1959, many nationalists chose to flee into exile and continue the movement abroad, including Ondó Edú. He founded the party Unión Popular de Liberación de Guinea Ecuatorial (UPLGE) ("People's Liberation Movement of Equatorial Guinea") in Libreville, Gabon, in October 1959. The party had the support of the Gabonese government.

In August 1963, Spain's government invited all exiled Guineans to return and announced a referendum on a draft bill to give the territory autonomy, scheduled for December. This led to nationalist parties hastily realigning, as many could not agree on the autonomy question. That same year, Spain began allowing open political activity in Equatorial Guinea, which led to several new Equatoguinean political parties being formed. Ondó Edú returned from exile that year, and his UPLGE became the moderate Movimiento de Unión Nacional de Guinea Ecuatorial (MUNGE) ("National Unity Movement of Equatorial Guinea") in November. (Note: Africa Today says that MUNGE was founded in 1962.) The creation of Ondó Edú's new party was supported by the Casas Fuertes ("Strong Houses"), large commercial companies and cocoa plantation owners.

Most exiles returned from Cameroon and chose to vote. Ondó Edú and MUNGE led the "yes" campaign, while Atanasio Ndongo Miyone was the only major nationalist figure who boycotted the referendum. On 15 December 1963, Spain held the autonomy referendum, with 62.5% of eligible Equatoguinean voters voting yes for autonomy. Ondó Edú and his party were seen as being a decisive factor in the success of the autonomy vote, which was rejected in the Fernando Po region but allowed to pass because of the large majority of Río Muni voters who sided with the "yes" campaign.

=== Prime minister of Spanish Guinea ===

Autonomous government council of Spanish Guinea
Office	Name	Term
Prime Minister	Bonifacio Ondó Edú	1964 – 1968
Deputy Prime Minister	Francisco Macías Nguema	1964 – 1968
Minister of Public Works	Francisco Macías Nguema	1964 – 1968
Minister of Forests	Rafael Nsue Nchama	1964 – 1966
Minister of Information and Tourism	Antonio Cándido Nang Ondo	1964 – 1968
Minister of Teaching	Luis Rondo Maguga Rolé	1964 – 1967
Minister of Agriculture	Aurelio Nicolás Itoha	1964 – 1968
Minister of the Treasury	Luis Maho Sicachá	1964 – 1968
Minister of Sanitation	Gustavo Watson Bueco	1964 – 1968
Minister of Industry and Commerce	Ramón Boricó Toichoa	1964 – 1968

When Spanish Guinea was granted autonomy in 1964, a provisional council was created to govern the country. Ondó Edú became the Prime Minister (or President) of the council on 1 January 1964. The council had eight ministers, along with Ondó Edú's deputy (or vice president), Francisco Macías Nguema of the political party Idea Popular de Guinea Ecuatorial (IPGE). The council included politicians from Spanish Guinea's various ethnic groups, including Fang, Bubi, and Ndowe people. The members were elected by a legislature. Spain was represented by a high commissioner or commissioner general. Major General Pedro Latorre Alcubierre held this position from the beginning of autonomy until his replacement in 1966 by Víctor Suances y Díaz del Río.

All members of the council received salaries of 40,000 pesetas, as well as a Mercedes-Benz, a house with free personnel, and "gifts" from the Casas Fuertes. Corruption was an open problem in the administration as well. Rafael Nsue Nchama was dismissed in 1966 for misappropriation of funds. Luis Rondo Maguga Rolé died of natural causes in 1967.

As MUNGE sought to bring together moderate nationalists and colonialists, the colonialists supported it and Ondó Edú's government as a way to weaken less moderate African nationalists. Rising investment in the new institutions increased the new political elite's dependence on the Spanish government, and those in Ondó Edú's autonomous council developed a greater interest in maintaining the political and economic alignment with Spain. Ondó Edú stated in 1968, "Guineans do not want their independence to resemble a bottle of champaign that evaporates in euphoria". During this period, the territory had a sizeable middle class, and one of the highest rates of school enrollment and income per capita on the continent.

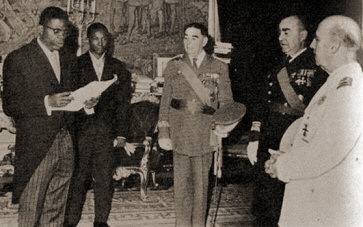
Ondó Edú (far left) in an audience with the dictator of Spain, Francisco Franco (far right) in June of 1964. The Spanish politician Luis Carrero Blanco (second from right) is also present.

In foreign policy, Ondó Edú established good relations with Gabon and its president Léon M'ba (also a Fang). He visited Libreville in May 1965, and was given a warm reception, being referred to as the "President of Equatorial Guinea" by the local press.

A Constitutional Conference was for Equatorial Guinea was held beginning on 30 October. Ondó Edú co-chaired a 41-member Equatoguinean delegation at the conference. The first phase ended on 15 November due to complaints from Fernando Po separatists. It resumed on 1 April of the following year, and proposed to unify the two territories into a single state and a democratic constitution, the latter of which was to be put to a referendum. The Equatoguinean delegation also became split on which presidential candidate to support for the new nation. Spain's Ministry of Foreign Affairs supported Ndongo, while most members of the autonomous institutions supported Macias, and Spain's Presidential Office divided its support between Ondó Edú and the Fernando Po separatists. A full, democratic constitution was proclaimed on 22 June, which led to complaints to the United Nations by the Equatoguineans due to their lack of input, but these were ignored.

The constitutional referendum was held on 11 August 1968. Ondó Edú and Ndongo campaigned in favour of ratifying the constitution, while Macias, Edmundo Bossio, and the separatists campaigned against it. The constitution was approved with 72,458 votes for and 40,197, or 64.32% for and 35.68% against.

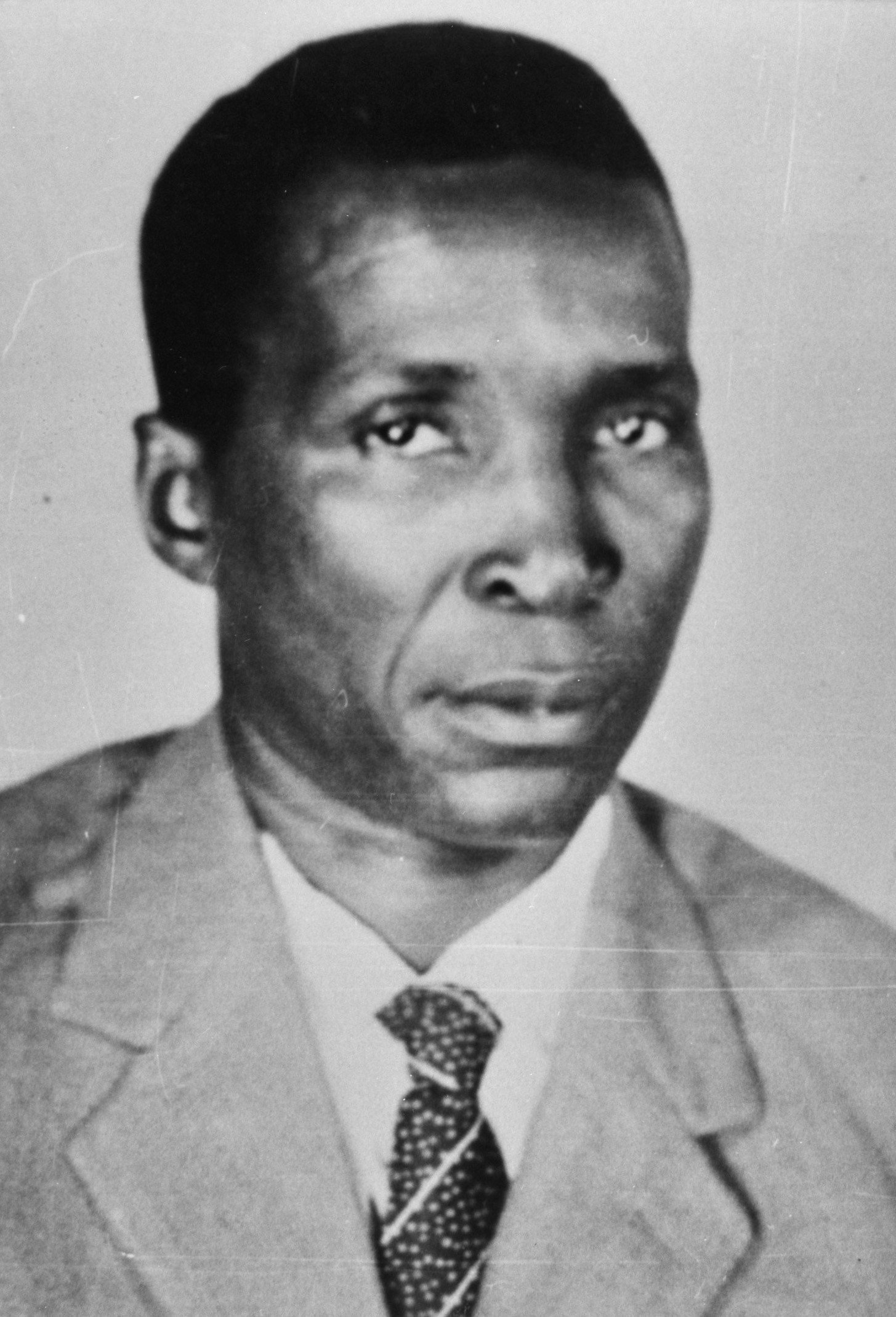
Francisco Macías Nguema (pictured) is speculated to have ordered the execution of Ondó Edú in 1969.

Immediately after the referendum, preparations for 1968 general election began, which would elect the legislature and the president. Ondó Edú was his party's presidential candidate in the election. The other candidates were Macías, Ndongo, and Bossio. Ondó Edú campaigned as a moderate who supported continued ties with Spain after independence, while his main opponent, Macías, was vocally critical of further Spanish involvement in Equatoguinean affairs post-independence. Ondó Edú had the support of then-Deputy Prime Minister of Spain Luis Carrero Blanco, the wider Spanish government, businessmen, the middle class, and various local ethnic groups. His official symbol was a gazelle. In the first round, held on 22 September 1968, he received 31,941 votes (34.84%) to Macías's 36,716 votes (40.05%), Ndongo's 18,223 votes (19.88%), and Bossio's 4,795 votes (5.23%).

Because no candidate had secured a large majority, a second round was held a week later, with Ndongo and Bossio being dropped. After they gave their support to Macías, he received 68,310 votes (62.92%), while Ondó Edú garnered only 40,254 votes (37.08%). Macías was ultimately declared the winner on 3 October.

On 11 October 1968, Ondó Edú was awarded the Grand Cross of the Order of Isabella the Catholic by Minister of Information and Tourism Manuel Fraga on behalf of the Spanish government. On 12 October, Ondó Edu transferred power to president-elect Macías. Fraga signed Equatorial Guinea's Declaration of Independence later that day, officially making the country independent from Spanish rule. Equatorial Guinea became the 44th independent African nation. The new government was a coalition of the existing political groups, but Ondó Edú was excluded.

=== Death and legacy ===
After the end of his term, Ondó Edú, fearing for his life, once again fled into exile in Gabon. Macías, who quickly began establishing a dictatorship, requested that Gabonese President Omar Bongo extradite Ondó Edú to Equatorial Guinea, but Bongo refused. However, the Spanish government complied and forcibly returned Ondó Edú to the country. Being returned to Santa Isabel, he was arrested, and according to the Equatoguinean government's official account, he committed suicide on March 5, 1969. However, according to one account, Ondó Edú was tortured in Black Beach prison for ten days by Mariano Mdemendongo, a member of the national guard, before finally being executed. According to Ibrahim K. Sundiata, he was imprisoned without trial, starved, and then killed in prison. Reportedly, the interior minister, Ángel Masié Ntutumu, was responsible for Ondó Edú's death sentence. His wife was also reportedly killed on Macías's orders the same year he was.

The historian Enrique N. Okenve views the support that Spain gave to Ondó Edú as a reward for his role in the success of the autonomy referendum. According to Gonzalo Álvarez Chillida and Gustau Nerín, Ondó Edú became a symbol of collaboration with the Spanish. In 2020, a social project called INES Bonifacio Ondó Edú was inaugurated in Ondó Edú's home of Evinayong, which, according to AhoraEG, "promotes the fulfillment of the social responsibility of companies". A hospital in Evinayong also shares Ondó Edú's name.
