= List of wars involving Equatorial Guinea =

This is a list of wars involving the Republic of Equatorial Guinea and its predecessors.

Equatoguinean victory
Equatoguinean defeat
Ceasefire or other result
Ongoing conflict

== List ==
Conflict	Combatant 1	Combatant 2	Results
1936 uprising in Spanish Guinea	(Spain) Spanish Republic	(Francoist Spain) Nationalist Spain	Nationalist victory
1979 Equatorial Guinea coup d'état	Government of Equatorial Guinea	Supreme Military Council	Coup attempt succeeds: Coup attempt successful; Francisco Macías Nguema is imprisoned, tried, and executed on September 29, 1979, along with six of his allies
2004 Equatorial Guinea coup d'état attempt	Equatorial Guinea; Supported by: Zimbabwe	Private mercenaries; Supported by: Private financial backers; Spain (alleged); France (alleged); United Kingdom (alleged)	Coup plot failed: Coup plotters arrested in Zimbabwe
