= 1964 Spanish Guinean provincial election =

Provincial elections were held in Spanish Guinea in May 1964 to elect the Provincial Councils of the provinces of Fernando Pó and Río Muni.

== Background ==
Spanish Guinea had been granted autonomy from 1 January 1964 by the Spanish government. A Government Council and General Assembly were created, whilst the two Provincial Assemblies remained.

== Results ==
The National Unity Movement of Equatorial Guinea (MUNGE) emerged as the largest party, and its leader Bonifacio Ondó Edú was appointed President of the Government Council.
