= Mónica Macías =

Equatoguinean author (born 1972)

- Born: 1972 (age 53–54); Equatorial Guinea
- Occupation: Author
- Notable work: I'm Monique from Pyongyang (2013); Black Girl from Pyongyang (2023)
- Father: Francisco Macías Nguema
- Relatives: Teodoro Obiang Nguema Mbasogo (cousin)

Mónica Macías is an Equatoguinean author. She is the daughter of the country's first president, Francisco Macías Nguema and cousin of incumbent president Teodoro Obiang Nguema Mbasogo. She lived in North Korea.

== Early life and education ==
Mónica Macías was sent at the age of seven to North Korea to study and reside under the care of the then-leader of the country, Kim Il Sung. However, just months after her arrival, her father, the then-president of Equatorial Guinea, Francisco Macías Nguema, was ousted in a bloody coup d'état by her cousin, Teodoro Obiang Nguema Mbasogo. Following her father's trial and execution by firing squad, Macías, her mother, and her two siblings were left stranded in North Korea. Soon afterwards, her mother left North Korea, abandoning her children. Despite this, Kim Il Sung continued to fulfil his promise to take care of her and sent her to the Mangyondae Revolutionary Military Boarding School in Pyongyang. The North Korean leader regularly spoke with her by phone, and helped her complete her university education at Pyongyang University of Light Industry. Macías stayed in Pyongyang until 1994, when she travelled to Spain, Equatorial Guinea's former colonial power and the birthplace of her maternal grandfather to learn more about herself and investigate the death of her father.

== Career as an author ==
In 2013, Macías gained media attention following the publication of her memoir, I'm Monique from Pyongyang (Korean: 나는 평양의 모니카입니다), which was written in Korean. In this book, she recounted her experiences in North and South Korea and how they shaped her perspectives on the issues of the two countries.

In March 2023, Macías released her second memoir, Black Girl from Pyongyang, which was published by Duckworth Publishers. The book attracted even more recognition and attention, as Macías shared the results of her interviews with about 3,000 people who knew her father, and concluded that he was not guilty of the crimes for which he was executed. Macías also revealed in her book that she has come to take pride in Kim Il Sung as her second father, and that she had to hide her origins when she moved to the West because she was raised by two men known as brutal dictators.

The statement from Macías' recent book summarizes her position on the controversial figures of Macías and Kim Il Sung, as well as her broader philosophical view on the morality of nations. She firmly rejects calls to denounce these figures, seeing Kim Il Sung as her rescuer. She also argues that no country can be deemed inherently "good" or "evil," and questions whether any nation has the moral authority to admonish others.
