= Bonifacio Nguema Esono Nchama =

Equatorial Guinean politician

Vice President of Equatorial Guinea
- In office May 1978 – 3 August 1979
- President: Francisco Macías Nguema
- Preceded by: Miguel Eyegue
- Succeeded by: Florencio Mayé Elá

Ministry of Foreign Affairs and International Cooperation (Equatorial Guinea)
- In office 1971–1979
- President: Francisco Macías Nguema
- Preceded by: Francisco Macías Nguema
- Succeeded by: Florencio Mayé Elá

Personal details
- Born: 24 April 1936 Mongomo, Spanish Guinea
- Died: 28 April 2015 (aged 79) Malabo, Equatorial Guinea
- Party: Fuerza Demócrata Republicana

Bonifacio Nguema Esono Nchama (24 April 1936 – 28 April 2015) was an Equatorial Guinean politician, known for having been Vice President of Francisco Macías Nguema and Minister of Foreign Affairs and International Cooperation.

== Biography ==
Nguema was born on 24 April 1936 in Mongomo, Equatorial Guinea. He was Catholic and was once mayor of Mongomo for a short time in 1982.

=== Career ===
Before he was vice-president, he had been Government Delegate, Secretary General for Foreign Affairs, Deputy Minister and Minister of Foreign Affairs of Equatorial Guinea (acting in effect in 1976).

=== Vice president ===
In 1978, Nguema became vice-president, by Francisco Macías Nguema, his cousin. It took more than a year before he left and calmed the rebels against the Macías' regime.

=== Later career ===
After the Obiang coup in 1979, Nguema participated in the Supreme Military Council. In October 1979, he was decorated by Obiang and soon after became ambassador to Ethiopia.

After his career, Nguema went into exile in Spain in 1990 and co-founded the opposition party Fuerza Demócrata Republicana in 1995. He returned to Equatorial Guinea in 2015, where he was murdered in a hospital at 5 am. according to the family.
