= 1960 Spanish Guinea by-election =

A by-election to the Spanish Cortes Españolas was held in Spanish Guinea in 1960.

== Background ==
Spanish Guinea was transformed from a colony to a province on 30 July 1959; this gave it the right to elect six members (three Africans and three Spaniards) to the Spanish parliament, the Cortes Españolas, a process not extended to Spain until 1967.

== Electoral system ==
Each of the two provinces (Fernando Pó and Río Muni) were to indirectly elect three members in electoral colleges. The 42 local councils on Fernando Pó (which had been elected earlier in the year) each elected four delegates to an electoral college that would elect three members of the Cortes Españolas; the 46 councils in Río Muni also each elected four members to an electoral college to select the other three Cortes Españolas members.

== Results ==
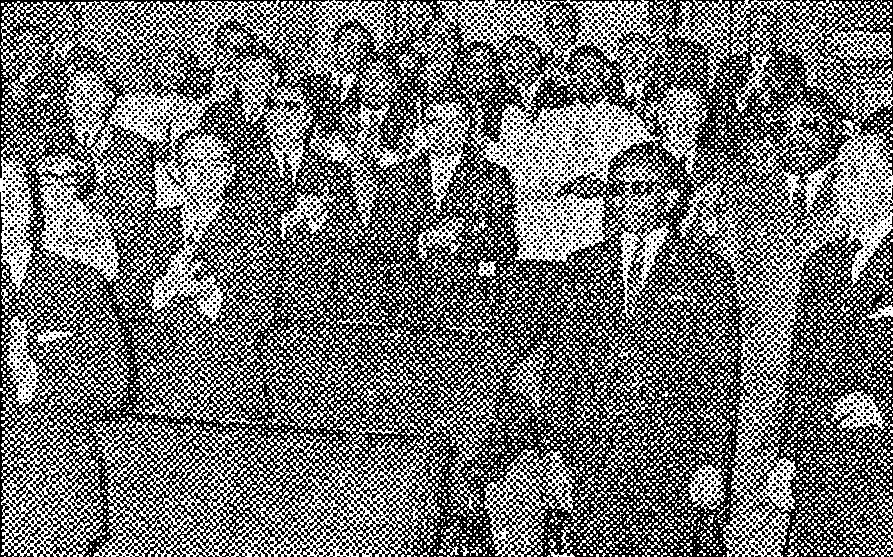
Guinean members depart from the Cortes after independence (1968)

In Fernando Pó two Africans (W. Jones Niger and C.C. y James) and one European (the President of the Provincial Assembly) were elected. In Río Muni, two Europeans (the mayor of Bata and the President of the Provincial Assembly) and one African (F. Esono Nsué) were elected.
