= 1968 Spanish Guinean constitutional referendum =

- 11 August 1968
- Do you approve with your vote the constitutional text prepared by the Constitutional Conference of Equatorial Guinea?

Results
| Choice | Votes | % |
|---|---|---|
| Yes | 72,458 | 64.32% |
| No | 40,197 | 35.68% |
| Valid votes | 112,655 | 98.09% |
| Invalid or blank votes | 2,198 | 1.91% |
| Total votes | 114,853 | 100.00% |
| Registered voters/turnout | 125,253 | 91.7% |

A constitutional referendum was held in Spanish Guinea on 11 August 1968, in order to prepare the country for independence from Francoist Spain. The new constitution would create a presidential republic with a 35-seat unicameral parliament, and was supported by 64.32% of voters with a turnout of 91.7%. Elections were held according to the new constitution in September.

== History ==
The constitutional referendum (and the independence process in general) was a culmination of a decade of governmental changes within Spanish Guinea.

=== Spanish moves toward decolonization (1959-1967) ===
In 1959, partly due to international pressure for decolonization, Spain began to reform the political structure of Spanish Guinea. Previously considered a territory of Spain, Spanish Guinea was reclassified as a region of Spain, ostensibly on par with the European mainland. This formally gave the Guineans equal rights with European Spaniards, though it also reinforcing the second-class status of Guinean self-governance compared to the European Spanish regions by placing the region under the direct control of the Spanish Presidency.

In 1963, the Regime of Autonomy (Spanish: Regimen de Autonomía a de Guinea Ecuatorial) was instituted within Spanish Guinea, as a compromise step toward autonomy. Approved by a 1963 referendum, this new system reduced international pressure on Spain to decolonize by granting the colony a degree of formal self-governance. In some sense, this change was illusory, as the new governing system reinforced much of the previous colonial governmental structure, but with a more palatable appearance to outsiders. However, the change also introduced local political groups into the government and served as a springboard for the independence movement.

In 1966, the United Nations Special Committee on Decolonization sent delegates to Spanish Guinea to assess whether the Regime of Autonomy reflected the will of the Guineans and whether it represented true self-governance. The committee's report after the visit questioned the legitimacy of the Regime of Autonomy and noted that the desire for independence was essentially unanimous, and the debate was only over the speed with which it should be given. The committee's report proposed that independence be planned no later than July 1968.

=== Drafting the constitution (1967-1968) ===
The Spanish government largely accepted the inevitability of Guinean independence at this point, though they dragged their feet in implementing it. In December 1966, Spain announced a Constitutional Conference would be held in early 1967. The conference did not actually begin until October 1967, and its first session was marred by disagreement over two key questions: whether Spanish withdrawal should come before or after the constitution was drafted, and whether Spanish Guinea should stay a single entity after independence or split into two independent nations, the island of Fernando Po and the mainland of Río Muni. The session ended in November without resolution of either issue.

After Guinean representatives sought the help of the United Nations, the Constitutional Conference resumed in April 1968. This time the Spanish foreign minister announced that the plan was to have Spanish guinea be released as a single independent country, which would hold a referendum on an electoral law and constitution developed by the conference. In June, the conference approved a constitution. A referendum on the constitution was scheduled for August 1968, and 12 October was set as the date of the handover of control from Spain to an independent Equatorial Guinea.

== The Constitution of 1968 ==
The constitution at the heart of the referendum was a "hybrid system", containing aspects of a unitary state and of federalism. The system was headed by a president, elected for a five-year term. The president selected a cabinet of the ministers, one-third of whom had to come from a different province than the president, and chose one of these ministers to be vice-president. The president and vice-president had to come from different provinces as well. The president could also request extraordinary powers from the legislature.

The legislature, called the Assembly of the Republic, comprised 35 members from across the country: 19 from the Río Muni mainland, 12 from the island of Fernando Po, and four from the other smaller islands. Though the mainland had the most members in the Assembly, the 12 members from Fernando Po was actually disproportionately high given its small population. The constitution also provided for a Council of the Republic, which functioned as a constitutional court and served as an advisory body for the Assembly.

== Results ==
The referendum was held on 11 August 1968. Despite general agreement on the goal of independence, the electorate was divided by the incompletely-settled issues that had arisen during the first session of the constitutional conference. Compared to the overall electorate, the island of Fernando Po had only a small majority in favor of the constitution (4763-4486). This reflected the ongoing division of the islanders about whether the island should separate from the mainland of Río Muni. These tensions between islanders and mainlanders had grown during the period of autonomy, with issues of economic inequality (the mainland was relatively undeveloped but had more residents) and ethnicity (the Spaniards had treated the Bubi people of the island generally better than the Fang people and other mainlanders).

| Choice | Votes | % |
|---|---|---|
| For | 72,458 | 64.32 |
| Against | 40,197 | 35.68 |
| Invalid/blank votes | 2,198 | − |
| Total | 115,853 | 100 |

=== By district ===
| District | For | | Against | | Invalid/ blank |
| District | Votes | % | Votes | % | Invalid/ blank |
|---|---|---|---|---|---|
| San Carlos | 793 | 32.8 | 1,624 | 67.2 | 1 |
| San Fernando | 439 | 80.1 | 109 | 19.9 | 0 |
| Santa Isabel | 2,904 | 51.4 | 2,749 | 48.6 | 2 |
| Fernando Poo | 4,136 | 48.0 | 4,482 | 52.0 | 3 |
| Acurenam | 4,951 | 98.8 | 62 | 1.2 | 0 |
| Bata | 8,967 | 75.0 | 2,995 | 2.5 | 0 |
| Ebebiyín | 9,606 | 49.7 | 8,621 | 44.6 | 1,113 |
| Evínayong | 10,196 | 100.00 | 1 | 0.00 | 0 |
| Micomeseng | 3,984 | 35.0 | 7,290 | 63.9 | 126 |
| Mongomo de Guadalupe | 1,424 | 22.0 | 5,029 | 77.7 | 19 |
| N'sorc | 3,183 | 56.5 | 2,420 | 43.0 | 26 |
| Puerto Iradier | 7,599 | 99.9 | 5 | 0.1 | 0 |
| Río Benito | 6,625 | 88.2 | 62 | 0.8 | 829 |
| Sevilla Niefang | 7,450 | 62.5 | 4,479 | 37.5 | 0 |
| Valladolid de los Bimbiles | 3,710 | 43.4 | 4,747 | 55.6 | 82 |
| Río Muni | 67,695 | 64.1 | 35,711 | 33.8 | 2.195 |
| Annobón | 627 | 99.4 | 4 | 0.6 | 0 |
Source: Álvarez Chillida

== Aftermath ==
Perhaps ironically, one of the major campaigners against the constitution was Francisco Macías Nguema. Macías was voted in as president under the new constitution a month later. Equatorial Guinea officially became independent on 12 October.

Macías quickly consolidated absolute power, rendering the constitution obsolete in practice by March 1969, less than a year after it was passed. In 1971, Macías issued Decree 415, repealing some of the constitution and placing all governmental powers in the office of the president. In 1972, he declared himself President for life. The constitution remained technically in force until 1973, when it was repealed and a new constitution, authored by the president's party, was approved by referendum, formalizing the one-party dictatorship.
