= Acácio =

Name list

Acácio is both a masculine Portuguese given name and a surname. Notable people with the name include:

== People with the given name ==
- Acácio Barreiros (1943–2004), Portuguese politician
- Acácio Casimiro (born 1949), Portuguese footballer
- Acácio (footballer) (Acácio Cordeiro Barreto, born 1959), Brazilian footballer and manager
- Acácio da Silva (born 1961), Portuguese cyclist
- Acácio de Almeida (born 1938), Portuguese cinematographer
- Acacio Mañé Ela (c. 1904–1959), Equatoguinean nationalist and politician
- Acácio Mesquita (1909–1945), Portuguese footballer
- Acácio Pereira Magro (1932–2018), Portuguese academic, economist and politician
- Acácio Rodrigues Alves (1925–2010), Brazilian Roman Catholic bishop

== People with the surname ==
- Adrião Acácio da Silveira Pinto (died 1868), Governor of Macau
- Daniel Acácio (born 1977), Brazilian mixed martial artist
- Marlon Acácio (born 1982), Mozambican judoka
