= Lorenza Matute =

Equatoguinean politician

Member of the National Assembly
- In office 1968–1971
- Constituency: Corisco

Lorenza Echame Matute was an Equatoguinean politician. In 1968 she was one of the first two women elected to the National Assembly.

== Biography ==
Of mixed race and Benga descent, in the 1968 parliamentary elections Matute was a candidate for the National Unity Movement in Corisco. She was one of two women elected to the National Assembly alongside Cristina Makoli, and subsequently she sat on the Foreign Affairs and Justice committees.
