= Marina Alene Mbá =

Marina Alene Mbá was a politician and women's organiser in Equatorial Guinea, founder of the women's wing of the United National Workers' Party (PUNT).

== Life ==
Marina Alene came from Río Muni in what was then the Spanish colony of Spanish Guinea. As a mother of six children in the 1960s, she studied in Barcelona with Sección Femenina (SF), the women's branch of the Falange movement in Francoist Spain. In 1968 she gained a degree as a general SF instructor, evidently impressing her tutors:

Of all the students of those provinces who have passed through this institution, she is the best, she is hardworking, has an interest in learning and to rally do everything... appears to be a person with true admiration for the SF's work.

Viewing Arlene as a natural candidate to head a women's organization in an imminent Republic of Equatorial Guinea, the Women's Section assigned her to travel across Spain to learn more about their organizational structure. However, following independence, in the context of growing anti-Spanish protests in early 1969, Alene frightened her Spanish mentors with demands for an entirely independent African Women's Section:

Marina is obsessed with command, she wants to be Delegada and Director of the School, she wants our house and car and also to live with us [...] to get it, she will use any means.

Reports circulated of an "anti-whites" meeting hosted at her house, calling for the need to "step on the whites and crush their heads and not stop until we manage it".

Alene became a member of the Central Committee of the United National Workers' Party (PUNT), representing the party internationally on women's rights issues. She oversaw the transformation of the Equatoguinean Women's Section into a Women's Section of PUNT. As well as organizing events and activities, the Women's Section required members to act as informants for the authorities about the political activity of their families.
