= 1973 Equatorial Guinean parliamentary election =

Parliamentary elections were held in Equatorial Guinea on 16 December 1973. The new constitution approved in a referendum held that July provided for a 60-seat People's National Assembly. The 1973 constitution made the country a one-party state with the United National Workers' Party (PUNT) as the sole legally permitted party. Voters were presented with a single list of 60 PUNT candidates for the 60 seats, which was approved by voters.

== Results ==
Party	Seats	+/–
United National Workers' Party	60	+52
Total	60	+25
Source: Nze
