= Cristina Makoli =

Equatoguinean politician

Member of the National Assembly
- In office 1968–1971

Cristina Makoli Biere was an Equatoguinean politician. In 1968 she was one of the first two women elected to the National Assembly.

== Biography ==
In the 1968 parliamentary elections Makoli was a candidate for the National Liberation Movement, and was one of two women elected to the National Assembly alongside Lorenza Matute. After being elected, she sat on the Industry and Mines Committee.
