= 1960 Spanish Guinean provincial election =

Indirect provincial elections were held in Spanish Guinea in 1960. Local council elections were held on 5 June, with some elected by corporations on 12 June. Two Provincial Assemblies (one in Fernando Pó and one in Río Muni) were subsequently elected on 28 August.

== Background ==
Spanish Guinea was transformed from a colony to a province on 30 July 1959. An electoral law was passed on 7 April 1960, creating two Provincial Assemblies half elected by local councils and half by corporations.

== Electoral system ==
The members of the Provincial Assembly were elected by two methods; half were elected by local councils and half by corporations.

The Fernando Pó Assembly had eight members (four elected by councils and four by corporations), whilst the Río Muni Assembly had ten members (five elected by councils and five by corporations).

== Results ==
The local council elections on 5 June saw 248 candidates contest the 207 seats available in 58 municipalities; 44 in Río Muni and 14 in Fernando Pó. Voter turnout was 100% in Sevilla de Niefang and 88% in Santa Isabel. On 12 June the remaining 30 municipalities (28 in Fernando Pó and 2 in Río Muni) were elected solely by corporations. The final stage of the elections took place on 28 August, when the local councils elected half of the Provincial Assembly members, and corporations the remaining half.
