= National Liberation Movement of Equatorial Guinea =

Nationalist independence party in colonial Equatorial Guinea

National Movement for the Liberation of Equatorial Guinea Movimiento Nacional de Liberación de Guinea Ecuatorial
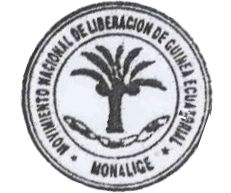
- Leader: Adolfo Obiang Biko
- Founder: Acacio Mañé Ela
- Founded: 1950
- Banned: 1970
- Headquarters: Equatorial Guinea, Gabon
- Ideology: Social democracy Nationalism
- Political position: Center-left
- Slogan: Democracy, Well being, Progress

The National Movement for the Liberation of Equatorial Guinea (Spanish: Movimiento Nacional de Liberación de Guinea Ecuatorial, Monalige) is a political party in Equatorial Guinea founded by Acacio Mañé Ela. It was one of the first pro-independence political movements in Spanish Guinea, during the 1950s.

== History ==
=== Beginning ===
The Monalige was created in the early 1950s, although some sources suggest its creation date was in 1947 or 1948. At that period of time it was named National Crusade for the Liberation of Equatorial Guinea (Spanish: Cruzada Nacional de Liberación de Guinea Ecuatorial, NCLEG). The NCLEG was led by Acacio Mañé Ela, who at that time developed a wide and profound popularity for his ideas of independence, carried out mainly among the most educated or prosperous social strata and individuals with social influence, such as teachers, administrators, farmers and catechists. Some of his most well-known supporters were Bubi Marcos Ropo Uri, Fang Enrique Now and Francisco Ondo Micha. In 1959, Acacio Mañé Ela was assassinated by the colonial authorities.

In the late 1950s (dates vary depending on the source consulted: 1952, 1956 or 1959), the NCLEG changed its name to the National Movement for the Liberation of Equatorial Guinea (Monalige, initially MNLGE), at the proposal of Atanasio Ndongo, who was elected as a secretary general of the party. Other Monalige leaders were Abilio Balboa Arkins, Pastor Torao Sikara, Francisco Dougan Mendo, Felipe Njoli, Agustín Efieso, Esteban Nsue, Ángel Masié and Justino Mbi. Monalige supporters mostly came from the native bourgeoisie, including small and medium-sized businessmen and professionals. The headquarters of Monalige were in located in Malabo. Monalige has also maintained ties with the Popular Idea of Equatorial Guinea (PIEG).

=== Activities during the colonial period ===
Atanasio Ndongo and other Monalige leaders were persecuted by the Spanish colonial authorities who accused the party of being communist. They were sent into exile in Gabon. In 1961 the Monalige was recognized by the Gabonese government led by president Léon M'ba.

In 1962, Leon M'ba demanded the Equatorial Guinean independence together with the IPGE before the Special UN Decolonization Committee.

After the Spanish Guinea was granted autonomy in 1964, many Monalige leaders (already recognized by the colonial authorities, but still viewed with disfavor) returned from exile. Atanasio Ndongo, however, would not return to his country until 1966. By the time the autonomous government of Bonifacio Ondó Edu was established, Monalige was already a major movement with a well-established support base among Equatorial Guinea, unlike the PIEG, which lost thousands of its members. Many members of the PIEG and MUNGE joined the Monalige, including Francisco Macías Nguema, Vice President of the Autonomous Government. Unlike parties such as MUNGE or IPGE, the Monalige advocated for immediate independence of Spanish Guinea, but maintained more moderate positions.

Monalige has funded organizations such as the General Union of Workers of Equatorial Guinea (UGTGE, a Christian-inspired union) and a youth organization known as the Blue Militia.

=== Independence and illegalization ===
The Monalige participated in the conference of 1968 Equatorial Guinea constitution, during which new Constitution of Equatorial Guinea was created. Monalige campaigned for the approval of this constitution in the referendum of August 1968.

For the 1968 Equatorial Guinean general election, the party presented Atanasio Ndongo as its presidential candidate. Ndongo obtained 19.88% of the votes, and the Monalige obtained 10 seats in the National Assembly. For the second round, the Monalige gave its support to the IPGE candidate Francisco Macías Nguema, who would finally be elected president, defeating the MUNGE candidate Bonifacio Ondó Edu. After the independence of Equatorial Guinea, several Monalige politicians assumed positions in the new administration of the country, including Atanasio Ndongo becoming minister of foreign affairs and Ángel Masié becoming minister of the interior. Pastor Torao was elected as president of the National Assembly.

Following the 1969 coup attempt by Atanasio Ndongo to overthrow President Macias, many Monalige leaders (including Ndongo himself, Saturnino Ibongo Iyanga, Armando Balboa and Pastor Torao) were arrested and executed. In 1970, Monalige was outlawed along with the other existing parties after Macias established the United National Workers' Party (PUNT) as the sole legal party and began a dictatorial regime that would last until 1979.

=== Present ===
Currently Monalige continues its activities in exile, remaining active to this day. Today, it is part of the opposition in exile to the regime of Teodoro Obiang and is under leadership of Adolfo Obiang Bikó.

== Electoral history ==
Election	Seats	+/–	Position
1968	10 / 35	▲10	▲3rd
