= Acacio Mañé Ela =

Equatorial Guinean politician

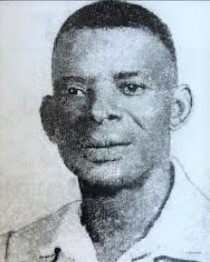
Acacio Mañé Elá

Acacio Mañé Ela (c. 1904 – 1959) was one of the first Equatorial Guinean nationalist and independence leaders.

== Biography ==
Acacio Mañé Ela was born into the Fang society of the mainland Afro-Spanish colony, in the Esambira clan, from the region located at the south of Douala (Cameroon) In 1919 he was admitted in the College of the Catholic Mission of Bata. He was baptized in 1922 and named after one of the leaders of the Catholic Mission, Father Acacio Ferraz. The Esambira and other clan of the region, the Esamengón, became linked in the 1940s, when a relative of Acacio Mane, Amadeo Mangue, married a member of the clan Esamengó, Isabel Mbang. He was natural of Ndjiakom-Esambira, on the district of Bata (in the current Litoral province), he worked as a farmer in the northern banks of the Campo River as did many of the Fang people settled in the far north of the Continental Region of Equatorial Guinea at the districts of Bata, Niefang, Mikomeseng and Ebibeyín respectively. He was a member of the Indigenous Trust and one of the leaders of the organization Cruzada Nacional de Liberación de Guinea Ecuatorial (National Liberation Crusade of Equatorial Guinea) (CNLGE), created at the beginning of 1950, although some sources suggest a creation date at 1947 or 1948. He maintained contacts with the traditionalist leaders of his region such as Jesus Oló Nzo from Ntuba-Esamengón and others. Mañé developed at the time a vast and profound activity of proselytism towards pro-independence ideas, spread especially among the more educated and affluent social layers and personalities with social influence such as teachers, administrators, farmers and catechists. Some of his best known supporters were bubi Mark Ropo Uri and fang people Enrique Nvo and Francisco Micha Ondo, a prestigious catechist who served in the mission of Nkue-Efulan.

In 1954, as proposed by Atanasio Ndongo, the CNLGE changed its name as Movimiento Nacional de Liberación de Guinea Ecuatorial (National Liberation Movement of Equatorial Guinea) (MONALIGE).

As the visible head of MONALIGE on the mainland, on November 28, 1959, Mane was arrested in Bata, near the Catholic Mission; he was transferred to the Marine barracks and then embarked on a ship that sailed to Bioko, but that did not reach the island. Since then it is believed he was thrown into the sea.
