= Ibrahim K. Sundiata =

American historian

Ibrahim K. Sundiata is an American scholar of West African and African-American history. He received his undergraduate education at Ohio Wesleyan University (B.A., 1966), and a Ph.D. (1972) at Northwestern University, where he studied under Ivor Wilks. He is the retired Samuel J. and Augusta Spector Professor of History and African and African-American Studies at Brandeis University.

Previously, Sundiata served as the chairman of the history department of Howard University, and taught at Rutgers University, Northwestern University, the University of Illinois at Chicago, and the Universidade Federal da Bahia. He has received grants from the Ford Foundation, Woodrow Wilson Center, and Fulbright Program, and was a fellow at the W.E.B. DuBois Institute at Harvard University. He is also a member of the Council on Foreign Relations.

Sundiata's research has focused on Atlantic slavery, migration and colonialism and its legacies in Equatorial Guinea and Liberia, and, more recently, on race relations in the United States and Latin America, particularly in Brazil.

== Works ==
- Brothers and Strangers: Black Zion, Black Slavery, 1914-1940. Durham, N.C.: Duke University Press, 2003.
- From Slaving to Neoslavery: The Bight of Biafra and Fernando Po in The Era of Abolition, 1827-1930. Madison: University of Wisconsin Press, 1996.
- "State Formation and Trade: The Rise and Fall of the Bubi Polity, c.1840-1910", The International Journal of African Historical Studies 27, 3 (1994): 505–23.
- Equatorial Guinea: Colonialism, State Terror, and the Search for Stability. Boulder, Colo.: Westview Press, 1990.
- "Equatorial Guinea: The Structure of Terror in a Small State", in African Islands and Enclaves, ed. Robin Cohen, Sage Publications, 1983, 81–100.
- Black Scandal: The United States and the Liberian Crisis of 1929. Institute for the Study of Human Issues, 1980.
- "The Rise and Decline of Kru Power: Fernando Po in the 19th Century", Liberian Studies Journal 6, 1 (1975): 25–43.
- "Prelude to Scandal: Liberia and Fernando Po, 1880-1930", The Journal of African History 15, 1 (1974): 97–112.
- The Fernandinos : Labor and Community in Santa Isabel de Fernando Poo, 1827-1931. Ph.D., Northwestern University, 1972.

== Sources ==
- Sundiata's biography at Brandeis University
