= Supreme Military Council (Equatorial Guinea) =

Equatoguinean military junta (1979–1982)

The Supreme Military Council (Spanish: Consejo Militar Supremo, CMS) — initially called the Military Revolutionary Council (Spanish: Consejo Militar Revolucionario, CMR) — was the ruling military junta and the de facto government of Equatorial Guinea between the 1979 coup d'état and the 1982 constitutional referendum.

== History ==
=== The coup ===
On 3 August 1979, President Francisco Macías Nguema was overthrown in a military coup d'état led by a group of officers who attended the General Military Academy in Zaragoza, among them Eulogio Oyó Riqueza, Vice President Bonifacio Nguema Esono Nchama, fallen from grace and the main responsible for the establishment of Cuban influence in Equatorial Guinea, Navy Lieutenant and commander of the National Navy Florencio Mayé Elá, Army Captain Salvador Elá Nseng, Popular Militia Lieutenant Braulio Nsue Ona, Lieutenant Felix Mba Ondo Nchama, military chief of Río Muni fallen into disgrace, governor of Banco Popular de Equatorial Guinea Damián Ondo Maye Avang, all of them led by nephew of Macías, Lieutenant General Teodoro Obiang Nguema Mbasogo, who had been warden of the Black Beach prison on the island of Bioko. Prior to the coup, Obiang had become Secretary General of the Ministry of Popular Armed Forces in 1976 and Deputy Minister of the Armed Forces in 1979.

=== Development ===
Overthrowing Macías, this group was constituted as the Revolutionary Military Council, chaired by Obiang himself. The other members of the council were Florencio Mayé Elá as First Vice President and Commissioner of the Ministry of Foreign Affairs, and Salvador Elá Nseng as Second Vice President, among others. The islands of the country (collectively part of the Insular Region) were renamed as Bioko (formerly known as Macías Nguema Biyogo) and Annobón (formerly known as Pagalú). The new regime found that the coffers of the state were empty and the population was barely a third of what was at the time of independence of the country in 1968, due to repression and exile.

On 23 August, the first ministerial cabinet of the council was constituted, composed of eleven members: President Obiang, Florencio Mayé Elá as First Vice President of the Government in charge of Foreign Affairs, Salvador Elá Nseng as Second Vice President in charge of Finances and Commerce, Félix Mbá Nchama (Interior), Pablo Qbama Eyang (Sanitation), Policarpo Monduy Mbá (Justice), Pedro Nsué Qbama (Industry and Mines), Paulino Obiang Enama (Agriculture, Livestock and Forestry), Tarsicio Mané Abeso (Culture and Public Works), Pedro Edú (Transport and Urbanism) and Melchor Ndong (Labor).

On 25 August, the United National Workers' Party (PUNT), the only political party in the country during Macías's presidency, was banned and the Revolutionary Military Council was renamed the Supreme Military Council. In September, before the trial against the former President Macías, a conspiracy was discovered to rescue him from prison, and a contingent of between 90 and 110 security experts from Morocco arrived at Malabo, after the visit to Rabat of Feliciano Mba, General Director of Security during the Macías regime. Macías was tried, sentenced to death and executed by firing squad on 29 September 1979.

On 12 October, Obiang proclaimed himself President of the country. On 31 October, for the first time since 1971, a cooperation agreement and a protocol of action was signed between Spain and Equatorial Guinea, followed on 5 December by a financial cooperation agreement, and two protocols. In February 1980, Salvador Ela Nseng was dismissed as Second Vice President of the council and replaced by Eulogio Oyó.

On 23 October 1980, Spain and Equatorial Guinea signed the Treaty of Friendship and Cooperation between Spain and Equatorial Guinea of 1980.

=== Dissolution ===
In August 1982, a new Constitution was passed in a referendum, replacing the council with a formally civilian government and the Chamber of People's Representatives.

== See also ==
- History of Equatorial Guinea
