= 1968 Spanish Guinean general election =

- Registered: 137,755
- Presidential election
- 22 September 1968 (first round); 29 September 1968 (second round)
- Turnout: 67.48% (first round); 79.20% (second round)
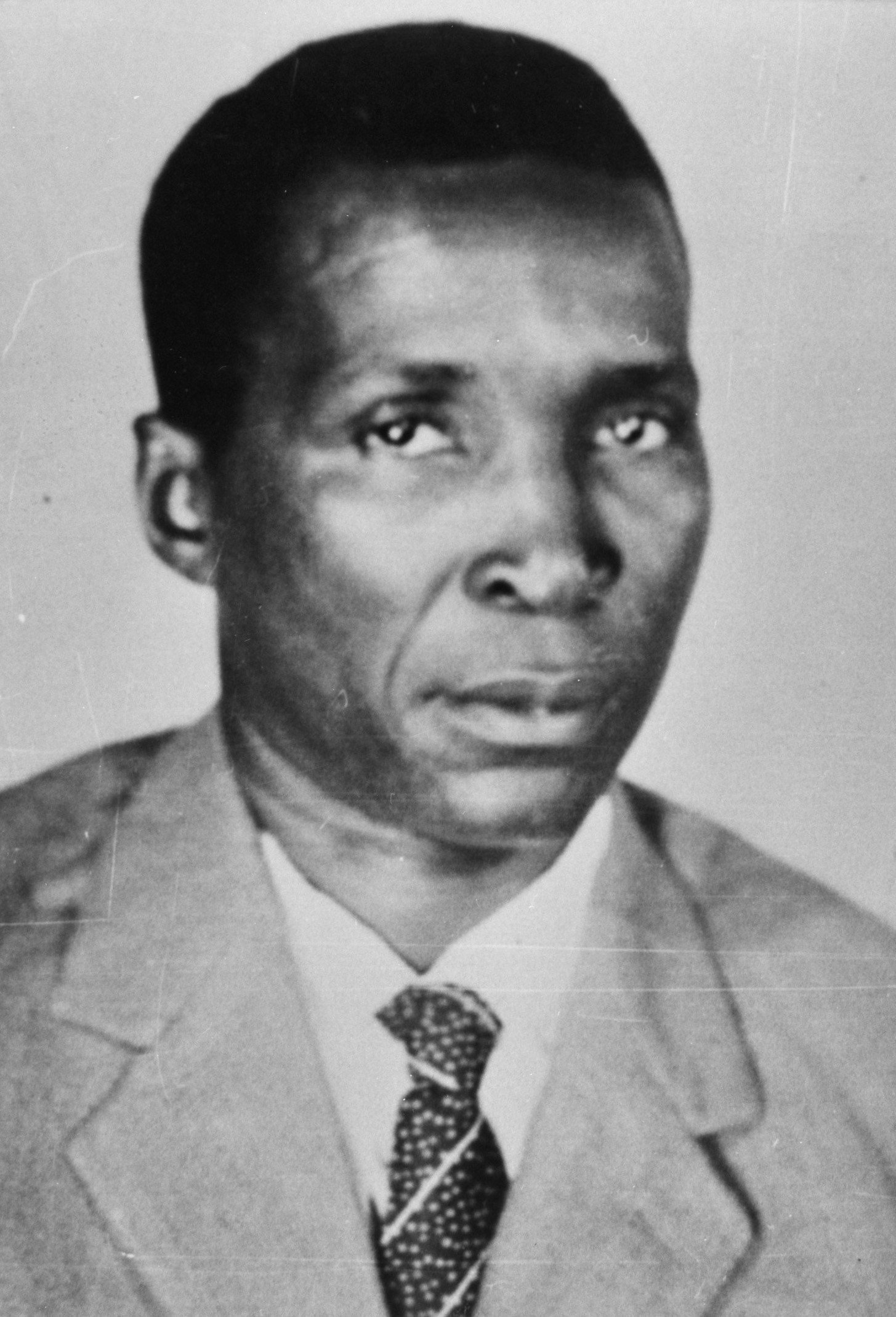

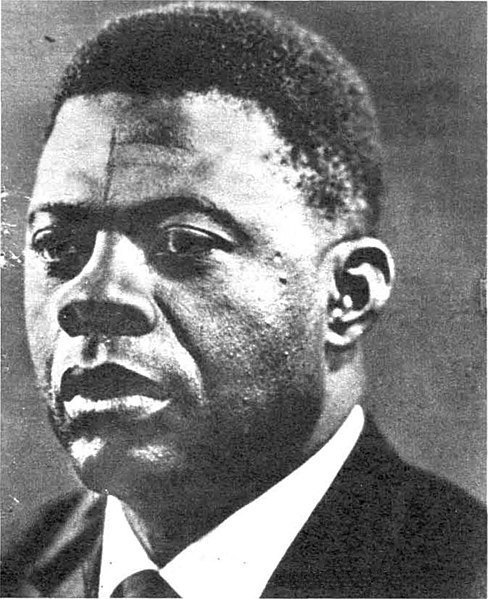
Candidate	Francisco Macías Nguema	Bonifacio Ondó Edú
Party	IPGE	MUNGE
Popular vote	68,310	41,254
Percentage	62.35%	37.65%
Elected President
Francisco Macías Nguema
Popular Idea
- Parliamentary election
- 22 September 1968
- All 35 seats in the National Assembly; 18 seats needed for a majority
Party	Vote %	Seats
National Liberation Movement	46.50	16
National Unity Movement	38.99	10
Popular Idea	9.11	2
Bubi Union	5.40	7
This lists parties that won seats. See the complete results below.
Results by constituency.

General elections were held in Spanish Guinea on 22 September 1968 to elect a President and National Assembly that would lead the country when it gained independence as Equatorial Guinea later that year. A second round of the presidential election was held on 29 September.

Francisco Macías Nguema of the Popular Idea led the field in the first round, advancing to a runoff with Prime Minister Bonifacio Ondó Edú. With the endorsement of eliminated candidates Atanasio Ndongo and Edmundo Bossio, Macías Nguema defeated Ondó Edú in the runoff. Ondó Edú's National Unity Movement and Ndongo's National Liberation Movement won ten seats each in the National Assembly, while the Popular Idea won eight. Voter turnout was 67 percent in the first round and 79 percent in the second round.

After Macias Nguema's victory, he appointed Ndongo as Equatorial Guinea's first Foreign Minister and Bossio as Vice-President, while he ordered Ondó Edú's execution shortly after independence. To date, it has been the only free election ever held in Equatorial Guinea. Over the next four years, Macias Nguema consolidated his power step by step; in 1970 he set up the United National Workers' Party as the only legally permitted party in the country and by 1972 he had declared himself President for Life with dictatorial powers. As a result, the 1968 elections would be the last contested elections held in the country until 1993.

== Results ==
=== President ===
Candidate	Party	First round		Second round	
Candidate	Party	Votes	%	Votes	%
Francisco Macías Nguema	Popular Idea	36,716	40.05	68,310	62.35
Bonifacio Ondó Edú	National Unity Movement	31,941	34.84	41,254	37.65
Atanasio Ndongo	National Liberation Movement	18,223	19.88		
Edmundo Bossio	Bubi Union	4,795	5.23		
Total		91,675	100.00	109,564	100.00
Valid votes		91,675	98.62	109,564	99.51
Invalid/blank votes		1,281	1.38	537	0.49
Total votes		92,956	100.00	110,101	100.00
Registered voters/turnout		137,755	67.48	137,755	79.93
Source: African Elections Database

==== First round results by region ====
District	Invalid/blank	Bosió	Ondó	Ndongo	Macías
Fernando Po	21	4,795	351	3,970	373
Annobón	0	0	575	1	0
Río Muni	1256	0	31,015	13,976	36,329
Corisco y Elobeyes	4	0	0	276	14
Total	1,281	4,795	31,941	18,223	36,716
Source: Álvarez Chillida

==== Second round results by region ====
District	Invalid/blank	Ondó	Macías
Fernando Po	9	338	9,259
Annobón	0	715	1
Río Muni	528	40,197	58,708
Corisco y Elobeyes	0	4	342
Total	537	41,254	68,310
Source: Álvarez Chillida

==== First round results by district ====
District	Invalid/blank	Bosió	Ondó	Ndongo	Macías
San Carlos	11	1,828	74	697	30
San Fernando	0	191	40	664	49
Santa Isabel	10	2,776	237	2,609	294
Annobón	0	0	575	1	0
Acurenam	14	0	3,567	437	85
Bata	32	0	1439	4,818	2,438
Ebebiyín	471	0	2,739	197	12,207
Evinayong	1	0	10,454	180	62
Micomeseng	272	0	1,519	121	6946
Mongomo	9	0	1116	33	4,787
N'sorc	37	0	2,261	137	1,850
Puerto Iradier	9	0	615	4,314	27
Río Benito	331	0	1,680	3,055	50
Niefang	37	0	3,395	546	3397
Valladolid	43	0	2,230	149	4480
Corisco y Elobeyes	4	0	0	276	14
Total	1,281	4,795	31,941	18,223	36,716
Source: Álvarez Chillida

==== Second round results by district ====
District	Invalid/blank	Ondó	Macías
San Carlos	2	67	2,780
San Fernando	0	48	844
Santa Isabel	7	223	5,635
Annobón	0	715	1
Acurenam	49	4,376	425
Bata	54	2,288	7,990
Ebebiyín	247	3107	14,238
Evinayong	5	12047	74
Micomeseng	8	1,650	8,149
Mongomo	50	1,290	5,863
N'sorc	47	3,594	2,553
Puerto Iradier	33	1,150	5,482
Río Benito	2	2,977	3,763
Niefang	21	4,701	4,381
Valladolid	12	3,017	5,790
Corisco y Elobeyes	0	4	342
Total	537	41,254	68,310
Source: Álvarez Chillida

=== National Assembly ===
Party	Votes	%	Seats
National Unity Movement (Pro-Ondó faction)	31,936	34.64	10
National Liberation Movement (Pro-Macías faction)	24,676	26.77	6
National Liberation Movement (Pro-Ndongo faction)	18,191	19.73	10
Popular Idea	8,397	9.11	2
Bubi Union	4,975	5.40	7
National Unity Movement (Pro-Macías faction)	4,010	4.35	0
Total	92,185	100.00	35
Source: African Elections Database, Álvarez Chillida

==== Votes by constituency ====
Constituency	MUN (Pro-Ondó)		MONALIGE (Pro-Macías)		MONALIGE (Pro-Ndongo)		IP		UB		MUN (Pro-Macías)	
Fernando Po	347	3.7	381	4.0	3,974	41.8	–	–	4,975	50.5	–	–
Annobón	575	99.8	–	–	1	0.2	–	–	–	–	–	–
Río Muni	31,014	38.0	24,281	29.7	13,940	17.1	8,397	10.3	–	–	4,010	4.9
Corisco y Elobeyes	–	–	14	4.9	276	95.1	–	–	–	–	–	–

==== Seats by constituency ====
Constituency	Total seats	Seats won				
Constituency	Total seats	MUN (Pro-Ondó)	MONALIGE (Pro-Macías)	MONALIGE (Pro-Ndongo)	IP	UB
Fernando Po	12			5		7
Annobón	2	2				
Río Muni	19	8	6	3	2	
Corisco y Elobeyes	2			2		
Total	35	10	6	10	2	7

==== Elected members ====
- Alfredo King Tomas
- Ángel Etugu Oguono
- Antonio Eworo Obama
- Antonio Ndongo
- Armando Balboa
- Clemente Ateba Nso
- Cristina Makoli
- Cristóbal Ondó Alogo
- Domicilio Sila
- Enrique Ncuna Ndongo
- Federico Makendengue Eouabo
- Gaspar Copariate Burkbake
- Gustavo Watson Buebake
- Juan Bestue
- Juan Nguema
- Julio Ngundi Nadjaba
- Lorenza Matute
- Manuel Gerona Hombria
- Manuel Nguema Obono
- Marcelino Ngale Econo
- Marcelo Epám Uri
- Mariano Ganet Bokuo
- Mariano Mba Michá
- Martín Esono Ndongo
- Maximiliano Michá
- Primo José Escono Micá
- Raimundo Ela Nvé
- Ramon Itanguino Elambani
- Ricardo Bolopá Esape
- Roberto Jora
- Salvador Boleko Ripole
- Saturnino Ibongo Ivanga
- Sebastián Oburu Masie
- Pastor Torao Sikara
- Salvador Nsamio Nsema
