= Popular Idea of Equatorial Guinea =

Nationalist independence group in colonial Equatorial Guinea

Popular Idea of Equatorial Guinea Idea Popular de Guinea Ecuatorial
- Leader: Clemente Ateba; José Perea Epota; Antonio Eqoro; Jaime Nseng; Enrique Nvó; Luis Maho
- Founded: 1958–59
- Dissolved: 7 July 1970
- Succeeded by: United National Workers' Party
- Headquarters: Ambam, Cameroon
- Ideology: African nationalism Left-wing nationalism Anti-colonialism; Equatoguinean-Cameroonian unionism Marxism
- Political position: Left-wing

Party flag

The Popular Idea of Equatorial Guinea (Spanish: Idea Popular de Guinea Ecuatorial, IPGE) was a nationalist political group created at the end of the 1950s with the goal of establishing independence in Equatorial Guinea. The IPGE is considered to be the first formal Equatoguinean political party. The IPGE was founded by a group of exiles living in Gabon and Cameroon, with their official headquarters in Ambam. Early party leaders included Clemente Ateba, José Perea Epota, Antonio Eqoro, Jaime Nseng, and Enrique Nvó, who was credited for starting the IPGE during his time in exile in Ambam. Nvo's radical political ideas and his rise to power in sections of northern Rio Muni concerned Spanish authorities, who allegedly paid contract killers to assassinate him in 1959.

== Ideology ==
The main goal of the movement was to unite Equatorial Guinea and Cameroon so they could gain independence through popular nationalism and progressive ideology. The internal bases of the IPGE maintained connections with the Fang population in the northeast region of Río Muni. Two fundamental characteristics of the IPGE were radical and eventually Marxist ideology and their goal to unite Cameroon with Equatorial Guinea following gaining their independence.

== History ==
=== Secrecy and beginnings ===
The IPGE began due to a split that occurred within the MONALIGE ('National Liberation Movement of Equatorial Guinea'), and was formally established in 1959 by exiled Equatorial Guineans in Cameroon at an attempt to start an interethnic movement. The party gained support from members of the Bubis, such as Marcos Ropo Uri and Luis Maho Sicahá, the Fernandino Gustavo Watson Bueco, and the Fangs Enrique Nvo, Pedro Ekong Andeme, Clemente Ateba, and José Nsue Angüe, among others. Rival nationalist groups included the Popular Union of Equatorial Guinea (UPLGE) which was created by Ondó Edú in Libreville and supported by the government of Léon M'ba, in addition to the MONALIGE, whose core supporters were the colony's petite bourgeoisie. Despite international help from countries such as Ghana, Guinea, Nigeria, Algeria, Congo-Brazzaville, and the United Arab Republic, it was the United Nations headquarters in New York that served as the most impactful. The first petitioners, speaking on behalf of MONALIGE and IPGE from Spanish Guinea were heard at the General Assembly's Fourth Committee in December 1962, as they denounced the strategy of assimilation the Spanish government had enforced and asked for independence.

In 1963, the Spanish government agreed to organize a referendum to determine whether or not the Equatoguinean population supported an autonomous regime. The new political arrangement included important changes, such as a significant rise in African political awareness and participation in the colonial administration. The Regime of Autonomy was approved at the end of 1963. During the referendum campaign, political groups were allowed for the first time to publicly express their viewpoints. Most of them, with the exception of the majority of the IPGE (a group detached from the IPGE and headed by Jaime Nseng) and MONALIGE, gave their support to the new regime. The results of the referendum on 15 December were 59,280 votes in favor of the regime and 33,537 votes against.

=== Crisis and splitting ===
In June 1963, the Coordinating Bureau was disbanded, with an amalgamation of Spanish Guinea with Cameroon after independence being one of the primary issues. The IPGE favored this policy, and they reportedly received a Cameroon subsidy during this period. On 31 August 1963, the IPGE called an all-congress meeting at Ambam, but the meeting proved to be unsuccessful, as the IPGE's own Secretary General, Jaime Nseng, rejected the main policy of the union with Cameroon and he went on to find a splinter group, the Movimiento Nacional de Unión.

Pera Epota was one of the preliminary leaders of the movement, and in 1963 was later made leader of an anti-colonial coalition in Cameroon. Half of the movement was in favor of a federation with Cameroon, but this decree was denied during the IPGE congress of August 1963. In addition, Enrique Nvo also played a big role in the fight for independence, as he coordinated most of the communication with the United Nations.

IPGE lost some of its support because its call for unification with Cameroon did not find local support. IPGE's Secretary General, Jesús Mba Ovono, was operating from exile when Spain granted autonomy to Guinea. On 12 October 1964, Ovono announced from Accra that they had joined forces in a new Frente Nacional y Popular de Liberación de Guinea Ecuatorial (FRENAPO). However, this union was short-lived. Between 1965 and 1967, IPGE's leadership became increasingly Marxist and removed from reality, and ultimately separated into two wings—a more radical group in Brazzaville headed by Jesús Mba Ovono, and a legal group within Guinea headed by Clemente Ateba.

=== The elections of 1968 ===
Principal leaders of the IPGE in 1968 were Clemente Ateba, serving as the legal authority in Guinea, and Jesús Mba Owono serving as the leader in exile in Brazzaville. In the September 1968 presidential election, Francisco Macías Nguema (IPGE) received 36,716 votes (40.05%) during the first round and later received 68,310 votes (62.92%) in the second round of elections. In addition, the IPGE was awarded 8 seats during the 21 September 1968 National Assembly election.

=== The party's demise ===
Francisco Macías Nguema became the first president of Equatorial Guinea on 12 October 1968 and was a candidate for the IPGE. However, throughout the Nguema regime, he established relatively unfavorable policies that affected the reputation of the party. Macías ordered the arrest of several leading political figures, including the former President of the pre-independence autonomous government. In 1970, Macías established the United National Party (PUN). On 7 May 1971, Macías repealed certain articles of the 1968 constitution, and gave the role of President "all direct powers of government and institutions". On 29 July 1973, a constitutional referendum was held, where 99% of the votes were recorded "yes" in regards to a centralized presidential republic. On 12 March 1979, the UN Commission on Human Rights designated a Special Rapporteur to examine the situation of human rights in the country and report to the Commission. The Supreme Military Council opened Case 1/979 on 18 August 1979, and began interviewing witnesses and collecting evidence against the Macías Nguema government. The Council subsequently convened a military tribunal on 24 September to try Macías Nguema and several members of his government. The charges for the ten defendants included genocide, mass murder, embezzlement of public funds, violations of human rights, and treason. Macías Nguema was found guilty and his death penalty sentence, along with six other defendants, was carried out on 29 September 1979. The IPGE did not hold a seat in the Equatorial Guinean government since, and is de facto defunct.

== Electoral history ==
=== Presidential elections ===
Election	Party candidate	Votes	%	Votes	%	Result
Election	Party candidate	First round		Second round		Result
1968	Francisco Macías Nguema	36,716	39.57%	68,310	62.35%	Elected ✓

=== Chamber of Deputies elections ===
Election	Seats	+/–	Position
1968	8 / 35	▲8	▲3rd
