= Francisco Macías Nguema =

President of Equatorial Guinea from 1968 to 1979

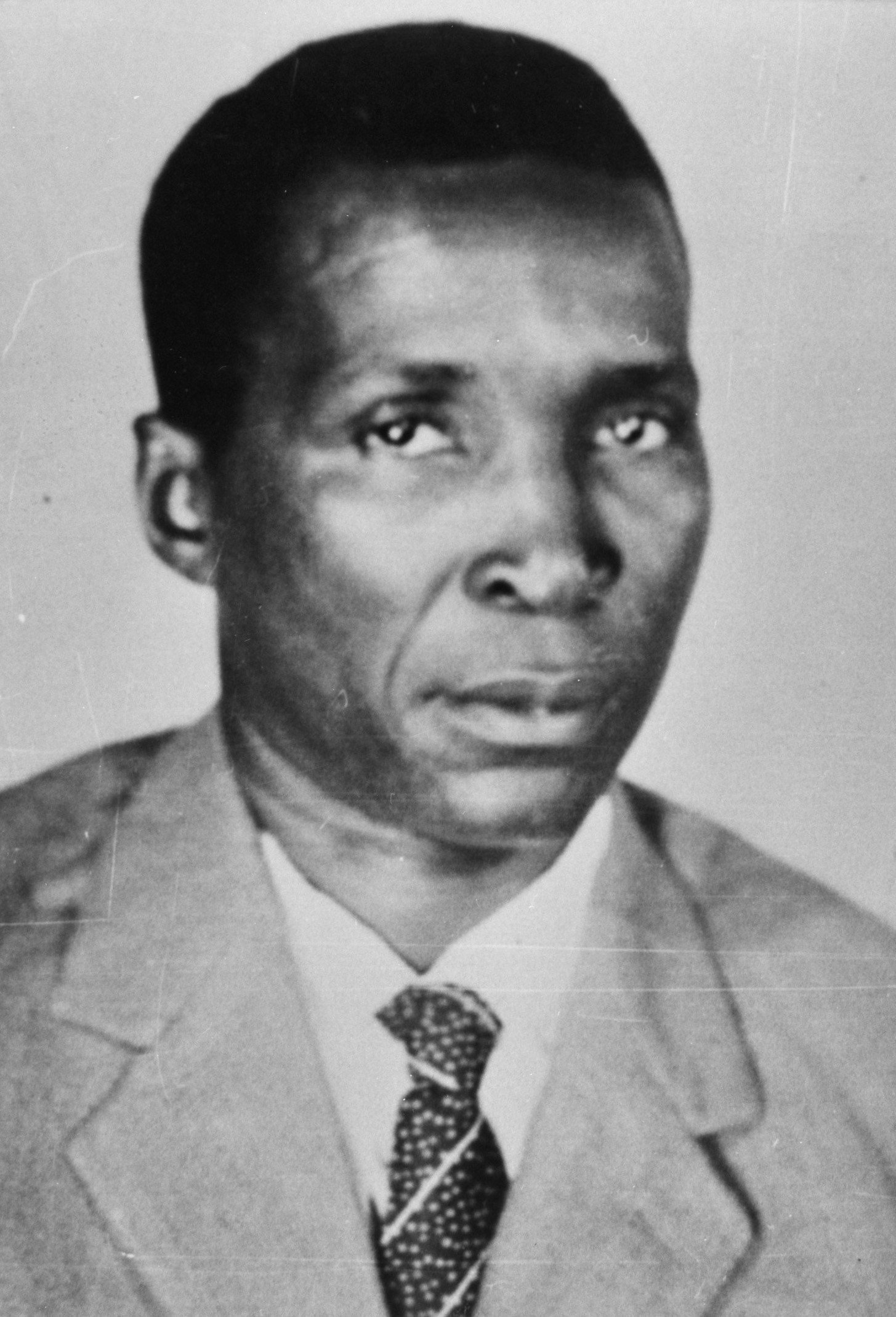
- Macías Nguema in 1968

1st President of Equatorial Guinea
- In office 12 October 1968 – 3 August 1979
- Vice President: See list: Edmundo Bossio (1968–1974); Miguel Eyegue (1974–1976); Vacant (1976–1978); Bonifacio Nguema Esono Nchama (1978–1979)
- Preceded by: Office established (Víctor Suances y Díaz del Río as colonial governor)
- Succeeded by: Teodoro Obiang Nguema Mbasogo (as Chairman of the Supreme Military Council) (1979) (as President) (1982)

Deputy Prime Minister of the Autonomous Government of Equatorial Guinea
- In office 1 January 1964 – 12 October 1968
- Prime Minister: Bonifacio Ondó Edú
- Preceded by: Office established
- Succeeded by: Office abolished

Personal details
- Born: Mez-m Ngueme; 1 January 1924 Nfengha, Río Muni Province, Spanish Guinea
- Died: 29 September 1979 (aged 55) Black Beach Prison, Malabo, Equatorial Guinea
- Resting place: Malabo Cemetery
- Party: United National Workers' Party (1970–1979)
- Other political affiliations: IPGE (1958–1963, 1968–1970); MUNGE (1963–1966); MONALIGE (1966–1968)
- Children: Mónica, Maribel, Paco, and at least one older son
- Relatives: Teodoro Obiang Nguema Mbasogo (nephew)
- Criminal information
- Cause of death: Execution by firing squad
- Status: Executed
- Convictions: Genocide; Crimes against humanity Mass murder Treason; Embezzlement
- Penalty: Death

Details
- Victims: approx. 50,000 – 80,000
- Span of crimes: 1968–1979
- Date apprehended: 18 August 1979

Francisco Macías Nguema (born Mez-m Ngueme, later Africanised to Masie Nguema Biyogo Ñegue Ndong; 1 January 1924 – 29 September 1979), often referred to as Macías Nguema or simply Macías, was an Equatoguinean politician who served as the first president of Equatorial Guinea from the country's gaining of independence in 1968, until his overthrow in 1979. He is widely remembered as one of the most brutal dictators in history. As president, he exhibited bizarre and erratic behavior, to the point that many of his contemporaries believed he was insane.

A member of the Fang people, Macías Nguema held numerous official positions under Spanish colonial rule before being elected the first president of the soon-to-be independent country in 1968. Early in his rule, he consolidated power by establishing an extreme cult of personality and a one-party state ruled by his United National Workers' Party (PUNT), and declaring himself president for life in 1972.

As President, he lacked a coherent political ideology, notably identifying as a "Hitlerian-Marxist" at one point. Domestically, his presidency was characterized by attempts at Africanization and harsh persecution of non-Fang ethnic groups. In foreign policy, he quickly turned against Spain and allied himself with the Eastern Bloc, receiving support from the Soviet Union, Cuba and North Korea, and to a lesser extent, France and its local allies such as Cameroonian President Ahmadou Ahidjo and Gabonese President Omar Bongo, although relations with Cameroon and Gabon collapsed by 1976. Due to his dictatorship's severe human rights abuses and economic mismanagement, tens of thousands of people fled the country to avoid persecution. This led to Equatorial Guinea being internationally nicknamed the "Dachau of Africa". His rule also led to significant brain drain, as intellectuals and educated classes were particular targets for his persecution. In 1979, he was overthrown in a coup d'état by his nephew Teodoro Obiang Nguema Mbasogo and was subsequently tried and executed.

According to various sources, anywhere from 20,000 to 80,000 of the roughly 200,000 to 300,000 people living in the country were killed under his regime, with tens of thousands more fleeing the country. He has been compared to Pol Pot because of the violent, unpredictable, and anti-intellectual nature of his government.

== Background and early life ==
Originally named Mez-m Ngueme, Francisco Macías Nguema was born on 1 January 1924, at Nzangayong, Spanish Guinea. His parents had been expelled with the rest of their clan from what is today Woleu-Ntem Province, Gabon, at a time when the Spanish Colonial Guard had not yet exerted control over the jungled area. The family was part of the Esangui clan of the Fang people, Equatorial Guinea's majority ethnic group. His family settled in Mongomo, where he was raised. Differing accounts exist of Macías Nguema's parentage and childhood, with some alleging that he was the son of a witch doctor who allegedly killed his younger brother as a sacrifice. Other accounts claims that his father was merely a local Fang noble. According to this version, at age nine, Macías saw his father being fatally beaten by a local colonial administrator, when he tried to use his title to negotiate better wages for his people. Macías was orphaned a week later when his mother committed suicide, leaving him and 10 siblings to fend for themselves.

Macías Nguema managed to survive several bouts of tuberculosis as a child, which left him with a profound fear of death for the remainder of his life. He was educated at a Catholic school through to primary level. He changed his name to Francisco Macías Nguema at this time after being baptized by Spanish Catholic missionaries, and would come to learn Spanish in addition to his native Fang. During his adolescence, he worked as a servant for some wealthy Spanish settlers, being described as helpful and obedient, which earned him ridicule and mistreatment by other non-Christianized Fang.

== Early career ==
Macías Nguema failed the civil service exam three times in the 1930s. Regardless, he eventually became a clerk in the Spanish colonial administration, after passing the exam on the fourth try with assistance and some favoritism from colonial authorities, serving as court interpreter. In the 1940s, he also worked for the Forest Service in Bata, the Río Benito Public Works Department, as a catechist in Bata, and in the Bata Public Works Service. In 1961, he first travelled to Madrid as spokesperson for a delegation which honoured Francisco Franco, Spain's dictator, on the 25th anniversary of his seizure of power. At the time, Macías Nguema generally displayed no anti-Spanish sentiment and collaborated with the authorities, preferring to work towards eventual independence within the existing system. Unlike many Equatoguinean activists at the time, he was never jailed by the Spanish.

As court interpreter, Macías Nguema eventually began taking bribes to manipulate his translations to absolve or incriminate defendants. The Spanish interpreted his important role in many trials as evidence for influence and talent for leadership, and began to rapidly promote him. He became assistant interpreter, mayor of Mongomo, minister of public works, and finally deputy president of the Governing Council within a single year in the 1960s after Spanish Guinea was transformed from a colony to a province of Spain. He also served as a member of the territorial parliament.

Even at this early point of his career, Macías Nguema already exhibited erratic tendencies. In a conference to discuss the future independence of Equatorial Guinea at Madrid, he suddenly began an "incoherent eulogy of the Nazis", claiming that Adolf Hitler had wanted to save Africans from colonialism and only got "confused", causing him to attempt to conquer Europe. At one point he declared himself a "Hitlerian-Marxist".

In 1964, Macías Nguema was named deputy prime minister of the autonomous transition government established the prior year. Around this time, Macías Nguema himself came to fear that he was mentally unstable. Before the 1968 Spanish Guinean general election, aged 44, he went to receive medical treatment in Madrid. Despite these concerns, Macías Nguema still ran for president of the soon-to-be independent country against Prime Minister Bonifacio Ondó Edú on a strongly nationalist platform in 1968.

Macías Nguema employed a Spanish lawyer to write his texts, providing him with a coherent agenda, and made various promises to improve his popularity. He would point at European-owned houses and ask the crowds if they wanted to own the place; when they responded positively, he stated that he would give them to the listeners if they voted for him. However, he was easily distracted from his speeches, and often made "chaotic public appearances". His bouts of erratic behavior were generally believed to be the sign of a "fearless" and "charming" leader.

In what has been the only free election held in the country to date, he defeated Ondó Edú in the runoff and was sworn in as president on 12 October. During his time as president-elect, he was awarded the Collar of the Order of Civil Merit. He was also made Commander of the Civil Order of Africa for his service during the colonial administration. By this point he had also distanced himself from Catholicism, becoming outwardly critical of the Church.

== Presidency ==
=== Early rule ===
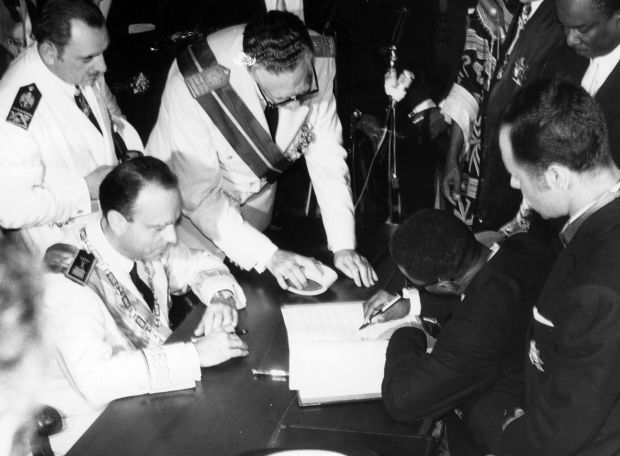
Signing of the independence of Spanish Guinea by the then Spanish minister Manuel Fraga together with the new Equatorial Guinean president Macías Nguema on 12 October 1968

After assuming power, Macías Nguema initially maintained a moderate policy and good relations with Spain, but within a year began to hold inflammatory, anti-European speeches and claimed that there were plots to overthrow him. His rival Bonifacio Ondó Edú then fled to Gabon. Relations with Spanish Deputy Prime Minister Luis Carrero Blanco had rapidly deteriorated. The coffers of the only two banks in the new country, the Banco Exterior de España and the Banco de Crédito, were emptied, meaning officials could not be paid. The country still lacked a national bank or its own currency, meaning the Spanish peseta had to be used, and according to the transition agreements with Spain, any biennial budgets approved for the territory prior to independence would need to be used, but Spain refused to honor its obligations.

In March 1969, Macías Nguema arrested his own foreign minister and political rival, Atanasio Ndongo Miyone, on treason charges, and fatally defenestrated him. Macías then took photographs of Ndongo dying on the street, later showing the album to Newsweek correspondent John Barnes. Ondó Edú was also captured and brought back to Equatorial Guinea, where he and several other senior officials were killed at Black Beach. (Note: Ondó Edú was officially reported to have committed suicide on 5 March 1969, although it is reported that he was actually executed soon after his return on trumped-up charges of plotting a coup.) Macías Nguema then accused Spain of creating an economic blockade by refusing to acknowledge obligations under the transition agreements, declaring he would not abide by the 1968 Constitution that had been "imposed" on the country by Spain and which he opposed.

He started travelling the country, encouraging his followers to fight against the Spanish, provoking a diplomatic crisis, also ordering the confiscation of all weapons possessed by Spaniards in the country and demanding they abandon all property they owned there. The Spanish government subsequently organized the evacuation of all its citizens (roughly 7,500) and all its Civil Guard forces, while the British ambassador described the Equatoguinean capital as being in a state of total chaos. At this point, Macías Nguema still recognized his own mental instability, and again sought help. After assuming the presidency, he made a secret trip to Barcelona and visited a psychiatrist for help. Although little was known about what advice the Spanish expert gave Macías Nguema, Kenyon argued that the treatment appeared to have failed, considering the president's subsequent development. Macías Nguema persisted in consuming large amounts of drugs.

On Christmas Eve 1969, Macías Nguema had 186 alleged dissidents executed inside the national football stadium in Malabo, as amplifiers in the stadium played Mary Hopkin's song "Those Were the Days", which was supposedly one of the dictator's favorite songs. 150 of them were shot or hanged, with the remaining 36 being ordered to dig ditches, in which they were subsequently buried up to their necks and eaten alive by red ants over the next few days.

In 1971, he began forcing the entire population to undergo daily military training with a wooden rifle.

On 7 May 1971, Macías Nguema issued Decree 415, which repealed parts of the 1968 Constitution and granted him "all direct powers of Government and Institutions", including powers formerly held by the legislative and judiciary branches, as well as the cabinet of ministers. On 18 October 1971, Law 1 imposed the death penalty as punishment for threatening the President or the government. Insulting or offending the President or his cabinet was punishable by 30 years in prison. On 14 July 1972, a presidential decree merged all existing political parties into the United National Party (later the United National Workers' Party), with Macías Nguema as President for Life of both the nation and the party. Fearing that the Spanish wanted to overthrow him, Macías Nguema offered promotions and other rewards to anyone who revealed a Spanish spy. This led to a climate of fear and suspicion, as owning the wrong book or having talked with the wrong person could result in punishment, imprisonment or death.

Having turned against Spain, Macías Nguema allied with the Eastern Bloc, enlisting support from the Soviet Union, Cuba, and North Korea. He allowed the Soviets to channel weapons through Equatorial Guinea to the MPLA in Angola, while repeatedly threatening to terminate this alliance in order to blackmail the Eastern Bloc into providing him with money. Throughout the 1970s, Macías Nguema exploited the Sino-Soviet split to play his backers against each other. The Soviets, Chinese and North Koreans provided Macías Nguema with military trainers and bodyguards. Soviet military assistance by 1975 amounted to small arms, eight patrol boats, twenty armored vehicles, and an An-24 passenger aircraft, although the latter quickly fell into disrepair. By 1977, about 200 soldiers had been trained in the Eastern Bloc. China and Cuba also contributed large numbers of technical experts, although their contributions were more varied, a 1976 U.S. diplomatic cable reporting that the vast majority of Cuban experts worked in the fields of teaching, medicine, agriculture, and public works, mostly on the mainland.

Macías Nguema reportedly viewed Chinese assistance in the most favorable light owing to the perceived lack of strings and the humble lifestyle of Chinese advisors and by 1974, only Spain exceeded China in aid contributions. In 1977, Macías Nguema took a trip to East Asia in hopes of shoring up support from China and North Korea in the face of increased Soviet and Cuban frustration. His relationship with North Korea remained good until his overthrow. He admired the North Korean dictator Kim Il Sung, and according to his daughter Monica Macias, the two were friends.

During the early 1970s, France also attempted to court Macías Nguema, who maintained good relationships with their closest regional allies, Cameroon and Gabon. For example, following the reported arrest of approximately 160 notables in August 1971, including the ambassador to Cameroon, the official French response was to back Macías Nguema's claim that the arrests were made following the discovery of a "Bubi conspiracy" against the president. These relations sharply declined as increasing numbers of refugees from Rio Muni poured into Cameroon, many coming to be employed in Cameroonian industrial plantations, which Macías Nguema claimed was a form of exploitation of his nationals. Cameroon and Gabon in turn raised concerns about the growing Eastern Bloc presence, and by 1976, relations had collapsed.

Starting in the early 1970s, Macías Nguema began repressing the non-Fang ethnic groups in the country, such as the Bubi people of Santa Isabel, whom he associated with relative wealth and education, and the Annobónese, due to what he felt was too much affection for Spain. In the decade preceding independence, Admiral Luis Carrero Blanco had actively promoted Bubi nationalism on Fernando Po in hopes of gaining leverage over mainland Fang leaders, in an unsuccessful bid to extend Spanish rule. During the post-independence years, these tensions did not abate. Santa Isabel was then militarized, with its inhabitants harassed. Pagalu, part of Annobón, was cut off from aid during a 1973 cholera epidemic, resulting in around 100 deaths. In 1972, mass arrests had taken place on Annobón after a majority of its electorate voted against Macías Nguema in the 1968 elections. Use of the Fang language was forcibly imposed, with penalties for anyone caught using Spanish or languages belonging to ethnic minorities.

=== Totalitarian dictatorship ===
==== Growing paranoia and cult of personality ====
In a plebiscite held on 29 July 1973, the 1968 Constitution was replaced with a new document that gave Macías Nguema absolute power and formally made his party the only one legally permitted. According to official figures, 99 percent of voters approved the new document. The same year, a United Nations mission was expelled from the country. Macías Nguema went on to establish a totalitarian regime with three important pillars: the United National Workers' Party, the Juventud en Marcha con Macías (JMM; English: Youth on the March with Macías) militia/youth group, and the Esangui clan of Río Muni. The country's instruments of repression (the military and presidential bodyguard) were entirely controlled by Macías Nguema's relatives and clan members.

The JMM became increasingly powerful, and its members abused their powers, often drunkenly harassing and imprisoning individuals based on mere suspicions of sympathy for dissident ideas. The President mostly filled his inner circle with family members such as his nephew Teodoro Obiang Nguema Mbasogo, who served as military governor of Bioko and Vice-Minister of the Armed Forces.

Macías Nguema developed an extreme cult of personality, and assigned himself titles such as the "Unique Miracle" and "Grand Master of Education, Science, and Culture". The island of Fernando Pó had its name Africanised after him to Masie Ngueme Biyogo Island; upon his overthrow in 1979, its name was again changed to Bioko. The capital, Santa Isabel, had its name changed to Malabo. His cult of personality even infiltrated the Catholic Church in Equatorial Guinea, as priests were ordered to thank the President before Mass, while pictures of him were placed in churches. At the Iglesia de San Fernando in Malabo a photo of the President was adorned with the statement "God created Equatorial Guinea thanks to Macías".

Macías Nguema suffered from extreme paranoia, perceiving plots everywhere against his life and rule. Over time, he ordered the mass murder of government ministers, members of the National Assembly, officials, and even members of his own family. Intellectuals and skilled professionals were a particular target, according to human rights researcher Robert af Klinteberg, who has described Macías Nguema's policy as "deliberate cultural regression". The president's paranoid actions included mandating the death of those who wore glasses, banning use of the word "intellectual", and destroying boats to stop his people fleeing from his rule. Fishing was banned. He was known to order entire villages destroyed just to eliminate one suspected dissident.

His prisons, especially Black Beach, were notorious for human rights abuses. Prisoners were humiliated, starved, tortured, and murdered without due process. When there was a trial at all, dissidents faced kangaroo courts organized by the JMM militia, as almost all judges in the country fled or were jailed during Macías Nguema's rule. In one of these show trials in 1974, even the defence team of the accused requested a death sentence for their clients. Prisoners sentenced to death were usually beaten to death with wooden clubs. Female prisoners were raped, often in front of their husbands. Macías Nguema's regime often imprisoned entire families, including the spouses and children of suspected dissidents. The abuse in the prisons was overseen by Obiang, who reportedly enjoyed mocking and torturing the prisoners. Among the few people who could still convince Macías Nguema to spare suspected dissidents were his relatives, such as Raimundo Ela Nve Senior, though his circle of confidants grew ever smaller.

==== Last years ====
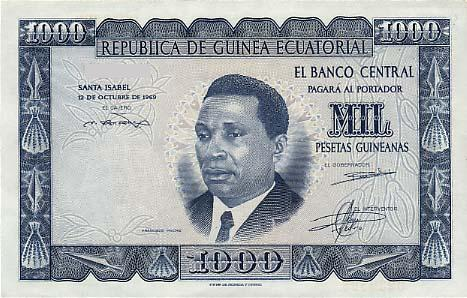
Macías Nguema depicted on the 1969 1,000 pesetas banknote.

Growing increasingly paranoid, Macías Nguema stopped living at the presidential palace starting around 1974, instead sequestering in a fortified villa at his home village of Mongomo that even had a private prison housing around 300 prisoners, some of which he executed himself. He declared private education subversive, banning it entirely on 18 March 1975 with Decree 6. Macías Nguema Africanized his name to "Masie Nguema Biyogo Ñegue Ndong" in 1976 after demanding that the rest of the Equatoguinean population replace their Hispanic names with African names. He banned Western clothes, foods and medicines, stating that they were un-African, with Macías Nguema obtaining the little food available and reselling it at prices the vast majority of the population could not afford to punish those he thought did not want to work. As he also decided at what time the food would be resold, products would often be expired before they were offered to the public.

Macías Nguema eventually outlawed Christianity, and used the slogan, sometimes claimed to be the national motto, "There is no other God than Macías". Owning anything related to Christianity became a reason for imprisonment due to alleged support for anti-government plots or coup attempts.

Following his repeated purges and unpredictable policies, the country's government began to fall apart. During Macías Nguema's rule, the country had neither a development plan nor an accounting system or budget for government funds. After the killing of the governor of the Central Bank, he carried everything that remained in the national treasury to his Mongomo villa. Statisticians were also heavily repressed, and as a consequence, little economic data was generated on Equatorial Guinea during the 1970s. When the director of the Equatorial Guinea Institute of Statistics, Saturnin Antonio Ndongo, published demographic data considered too low by Macías, he was dismembered to "help him learn to count".

After 1973, his regime also suppressed private commercial activity, and due to a lack of exports and foreign investment (the latter due to Macías Nguema's refusal in most cases), the nation lacked foreign currency, meaning that the Equatorial Guinean ekwele introduced in 1975, which had quickly lost nearly all value, could not be replaced. Only Macías Nguema, the army, and the police were able to receive a regular salary during this time, with others sometimes going months without getting paid, eventually leading to the economy shifting to a subsistence barter system and government services shrinking to only cover internal security. Starting in 1976, Macías Nguema mandated that all children between the ages of 7 and 14 receive military training, and that any parent or person refusing would be imprisoned or shot.

Tens of thousands of citizens responded by fleeing in fear of persecution and to protect their personal safety. Af Klinteberg reported that as of 1978, at least 101,000 persons, out of a contemporary population that the World Bank estimates totalled 215,284 persons—nearly 47% of the population—had fled the country. Other reporting, such as a 1979 Time magazine account stating that "perhaps 150,000" persons fled, suggests that the proportion of the population that sought safety in exile may have approached 70%, based on the World Bank's estimate of the population in 1979. By the end of his rule, nearly all of the country's educated class was either executed or forced into exile—a brain drain from which the country has never recovered. Two-thirds of the legislature and 10 of his original ministers were also killed or had been disappeared.

To prevent people from escaping, Macías Nguema had mines buried in the only road out of the country and ordered camouflaged ditches with spikes be constructed along the mainland border. In 1976, Nigeria evacuated 45,000 contract laborers from the country, citing "brutal ill treatment" by Macías Nguema's regime. In 1977, responding to falling cocoa production (one of the country's main export items), the President instituted a "system of slavery". During his presidency, his country was nicknamed the "Dachau of Africa", with condemnations of his government issued by the International Commission of Jurists, World Council of Churches, the UN, the Organisation of African Unity, Amnesty International, and the European Commission.

By 1978, a United States House of Representatives joint resolution condemning him for acts of religious persecution and genocide had been proposed. By 1979, his servants stated that Macías Nguema had become increasingly withdrawn. He wandered in his villa, repeatedly saying the names of his victims, and worshipping a collection of heads as per Fang tradition, hoping that this would grant him power. Even more disturbing to the servants was one occasion when he ordered a meal and table to be prepared for eight guests. He then sat there alone, casually talking "with the dead".

Members of Macías Nguema's inner circle and government officials became more and more worried about his erratic behavior. By that time, the government had mostly ceased to function, as most minister posts were vacant, officials were no longer paid, and the National Assembly was effectively defunct, while the JMM militia ran amok across Equatorial Guinea, drunkenly murdering civilians. The overcrowding of the prisons was solved through regular mass executions, though many prisoners were simply left to starve to death. Even the presidential guards were forced to survive by scavenging fruits and hunting wild animals, as supply had mostly collapsed.

In mid-April 1979, Macías Nguema's wife travelled to North Korea for surgery, taking with her their three younger children, Monica, Maribel and Paco.

=== Overthrow ===
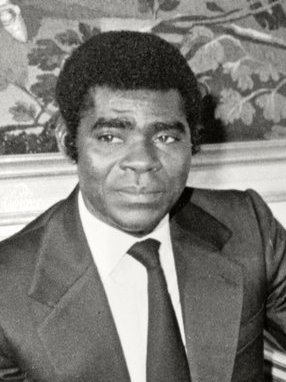
Teodoro Obiang Nguema Mbasogo, Macías Nguema's nephew and leader of the coup against him

By 1979, Macías Nguema's government had garnered condemnation from the United Nations and European Commission. That summer, Macías Nguema organised the execution of several members of his own family, leading several members of his inner circle to fear that he was no longer acting rationally. On 3 August 1979, he was overthrown by his nephew, Colonel Teodoro Obiang Nguema Mbasogo, whose brother was among those murdered by the President. Obiang achieved his coup mostly with the help of his cousins with whom he had previously attended a Spanish military academy together and who now headed the military. As Macías Nguema was still at his palace, isolated from the rest of the country due to his fear of being overthrown, the coup met no organized opposition.

The deposed ruler and a contingent of loyal forces initially tried to resist the coup upon hearing of it, but his forces eventually abandoned him. He fled into the jungle of Rio Muni, possibly intending to get across the border into exile, but was captured on 18 August. The former president was found by an old woman; he was exhausted and probably delirious, sitting beneath a tree and eating sugarcane. Obiang's troops proceeded to arrest him, and found his nearby car stuffed full of suitcases with $4 million in cash.

It was believed that Macías Nguema had actually burned $100 million (much of Equatorial Guinea's cash reserves) before attempting to escape the country as revenge. When his wife heard of his overthrow, she returned to Equatorial Guinea to protect their eldest son. Monica, Maribel, and Paco remained behind for their own safety, and consequently lived in North Korea for the remainder of their childhood. Monica stated that Kim Il Sung honored his friendship to Macías Nguema by acting as their guardian and financing their education.

== Trial and execution ==
The Supreme Military Council opened Case 1979 on 18 August 1979, and began interviewing witnesses and collecting evidence against the Macías Nguema government. The Council subsequently convened a military tribunal on 24 September to try Macías Nguema and ten members of his government. The charges for the ten defendants included genocide, mass murder, embezzlement of public funds, violations of human rights, and treason. Besides the deposed President, the accused were described by Kenyon as "bit-part actors" who had held no important positions under the old regime. Their presence was supposed to make the trial look more legitimate. Macías Nguema appeared generally calm and unafraid during the trial.

The state prosecutor requested that Macías Nguema receive a death sentence, five others receive 30-year sentences, three others receive a year in prison, and two be sentenced to time served. Macías Nguema's defense counsel countered that the other co-defendants were responsible for specific crimes, and asked for acquittal. Macías Nguema himself delivered a statement to the court outlining what he viewed as the extensive good deeds he had performed for the country. At noon on 29 September 1979, the Tribunal delivered its sentences, which were more severe than what the prosecution had requested. Macías Nguema and six of his co-defendants were sentenced to death, and the confiscation of their property; the deposed President was sentenced to death "101 times". Two defendants were sentenced to fourteen years in prison each, and two others to four years each.

With no higher court available to hear appeals, the decision of the Special Military Tribunal was final. However, one problem arose, as Macías Nguema reportedly swore that his ghost would return and take revenge on those who had condemned him. As a result, the Equatoguinean soldiers refused to shoot him. A group of hired Moroccan troops was instead employed to carry out the sentence. The 55-year old Macías Nguema and the six other defendants sentenced to death were executed by Moroccan mercenaries at Black Beach around 6 pm the same day.

== Regime impact ==
At his trial, Macías Nguema's regime was estimated to have killed between 20,000 and 50,000 people, equating to between 9 and 23 percent of the country's contemporary population, with some estimates ranging as high as 80,000 deaths. The lower end of estimates by scholars such as Scott Straus and Max Liniger-Goumaz, however, are approximately 5,000. By the end of Macías Nguema's rule, over half the population had been arrested at least once, or had a relative who had been killed. During his trial, 514 deaths were specifically enumerated. Equatorial Guinea's per capita income fell from about $1,420 in 1968 to about $70 in 1975. Infant mortality rose to about 60%. National life expectancy declined to about 30 years.

== Personal life ==
=== Family ===
Macías Nguema's wider clan, led by Teodoro Obiang Nguema Mbasogo, still leads Equatorial Guinea as of 2018. By 2007, his children had all left North Korea. However, Macías Nguema's daughter Mónica had relocated from North Korea to South Korea, considering Korea her home and Korean her native tongue; she had published a Korean-language memoir about her own life. Macías Nguema's wife and daughter Maribel live in Spain, and his sons in Equatorial Guinea.

=== Personality and mental illness ===
Macías is widely considered to have been mentally ill.

Medical reports from his early career suggested that Macías Nguema was mentally unstable. Based on a report from 1968, the French foreign intelligence service SDECE argued that he suffered from mental disorders and venereal diseases whose effects on his psyche were made even worse by his regular abuse of drugs such as cannabis in the form of the edible derivative bhang; and iboga, a drink with strong hallucinogenic effects. Before independence, during the Constitutional Conference in 1967, a Spanish doctor confidentially diagnosed him as paranoid and schizoid. During one of his stays in Spain, he was also diagnosed as manic-depressive. In 1970, Macías was treated by the same Spanish doctor who had diagnosed him in 1967.

Several contemporaries, such as the French ambassador to Equatorial Guinea, believed that Macías Nguema was insane. Some observers have posited that Macías Nguema may have been a psychopath, a disorder potentially enabled, in part, by reported childhood psychological trauma, and that his behaviour could have been affected by other possible mental illnesses, as well as his reported periodic use of drugs. Journalist Paul Kenyon described Macías Nguema as "dangerously mentally ill".

In the book Guinea Materia Reservada, Rafael Fernández gave the following description of Macías and his behavior:

... of a sanguine nature, he ostensibly tries to display a strong personality, although he frequently falls into outbursts that denote a lack of emotional balance. His notable deafness creates awkward situations and makes dealing with him difficult in personal interviews. He is naturally distrustful, suspicious, and lacks mental agility. He tends to raise his voice even to his own ministers and diplomats, some of whom he even verbally abuses. (...) The president lives as the protagonist twenty-four hours a day, and the distance separating him from all his collaborators is abysmal. The reports from the Cabinet meetings indicate that only the vice president of the government dares to disagree on technical matters. A curious note is his public allusions to his desire to imitate Franco, whose persona he usually respects in almost all his speeches and with whom he has said he wishes to meet, but at the level of colleagues or "homonyms." ...He is an uneducated man, but he has a primitive art for words, an intuition for the verb. He alternates between Fang and Spanish, but he connects with the masses and achieves surprising effects.

Rafael Mendizábal, Macías's technician during the first year of his presidential term, described him as "prudent and violent", "realistic and utopian simultaneously" and "energetic but hesitant". Macías suffered from outbursts of violence that were then followed by intervals of balance and lucidity, having an incongruously changeable and fickle personality. With paroxysmal tendencies, Macías went through phases of total silence or verbosity. A fearful, insecure person (according to his palace guards, he did not recognize his weaknesses and blamed others for his mistakes) and very suspicious, Macías was always thinking that someone would assassinate him or take power from him, and came to count around twenty alleged coup attempts. According to Macías, some alleged coup attempts were even plotted inside prisons. Before leaving on official trips, Macías ordered the execution of several political prisoners to dissuade his opponents from plotting against him. He was also obsessed with his safety, and surrounded himself with a Praetorian Guard composed of 155 soldiers. Always worried about a possible overthrow, Macías stopped making public appearances in 1975 and retired to live first in Mongomo, and then in his hometown, Nzangayong. There, he would spend hours sitting around a campfire talking with relatives and village elders about state policy. In his home village, Macías dedicated himself to fishing, hunting and subsistence farming, using political prisoners who were sent to him as labor. He refused to move to Malabo unless an extremely urgent situation arose.

Despite being a leader of the masses, on a personal level he was introverted, moody and socially maladjusted. He has been described as megalomaniac (on one occasion he declared "I am the president, therefore I am more than all of you together"), and at the same time, paradoxically, it has been suggested that he suffered from a marked inferiority complex. From this double complex (of inferiority with respect to Spain and of superiority with respect to other Guineans) his ultranationalist political thinking may have arisen.

Macías has also been described as a very suspicious individual. According to Adolfo Enrique Millan, a former colonial official and secretary to Macías during the early days of his government, the dictator had a rather childish mentality. Other people who were close to him at one time describe him as vain and fond of luxury. All the furniture in his palace was imported, with air conditioning and a golden bathroom faucet. Macías demanded that women from surrounding towns walk kilometers to his palace and wake him up with songs.

Macías's full unbridled personality came to light after he became president: during his time as vice president of the Autonomous Government, he was known as a healthy, simple man, without vices, not a womanizer, and above all rational.

At the height of his insanity, Macías would engage in monologues and even "dine" with already eliminated adversaries. He even went so far as to make decisions based on his nightmares and night visions.

His noticeable deafness also became a problem during his 1979 trial, as Macías could not hear some of the questions asked by the Court.

== Notes ==
Political offices
Preceded by Víctor Suances y Díaz del Río (as colonial governor)	President of Equatorial Guinea; 1968–1979	Succeeded by Teodoro Obiang Nguema Mbasogo
