= 1973 Equatorial Guinean constitutional referendum =

A constitutional referendum was held in Equatorial Guinea on 29 July 1973. The new constitution would make the country a one-party state with the newly formed United National Workers' Party as the sole legal party. The officially reported results indicated that the change was approved by 99% of voters.

== Results ==
Choice	Votes	%
For		99
Against		1
Invalid/blank votes		-
Total		100
Source: African Elections Database
