= United National Workers' Party =

Ruling political party of Equatorial Guinea from 1970 to 1979

United National Workers' Party Partido Único Nacional de los Trabajadores
- Abbreviation: PUNT
- Leader: Francisco Macías Nguema
- Secretary-General: Buenaventura Ochaga Ngomo (1970–1976)
- Presidium: Central Committee (1970–1977)
- Founder: Francisco Macías Nguema
- Founded: 7 July 1970
- Banned: 25 August 1979
- Preceded by: Popular Idea of Equatorial Guinea
- Headquarters: Malabo, Bioko Norte
- Youth wing: Youth in March with Macías
- Women's wing: Feminine Section
- Ideology: Ultranationalism; Anti-colonialism; Anti-intellectualism; Pan-Africanism; Socialism; African socialism Fang interests Fascism
- Political position: Syncretic (Note: The character of the party and regime is disputed, with some describing it as being an example of leftist politics, others describing it as an example of fascism, and yet others finding parallels with Franco's regime. Others believe it was simply a product of Macias' insanity.)
- Colors: Green, Gray and Ochre

The United National Workers' Party (Spanish: Partido Único Nacional de los Trabajadores, lit. 'Sole National Workers' Party', PUNT) was a political party in Equatorial Guinea. It was the only political party in the country from 1970 to 1979, during the totalitarian dictatorship of Francisco Macías Nguema.

The party was influenced by Francoism, African nationalism, and the Authenticité of Zaire, although it often employed socialist rhetoric.

== History ==
The PUNT was created and led by Francisco Macías Nguema, former leader of the Popular Idea of Equatorial Guinea (IPGE) and, since the independence from Spain, President of Equatorial Guinea (confirmed by the 1968 general election). The party was officially founded on 7 July 1970 on the structure of the Sole National Party (Spanish: Partido Único Nacional, PUN), existing from January to February of that same year.

The PUN was formed in January 1970, after Macías issued a decree suppressing all existing political parties in the country. Previously, in December 1968, Macías had already announced that there would soon be a single party to "unify ideas".

Macías assumed the post of president for life of the PUNT, whose highest body was the Central Committee. The Central Committee consisted of Macías as president, his ministers, civil governors of the provinces, government delegates and high-ranking officers of the Armed Forces. The other structures of the PUNT consisted of base, district and provincial committees. In 1977, the Central Committee was disbanded and Macías assumed absolute power in the PUNT. The Permanent Secretary-General of the PUNT was Buenaventura Ochaga Ngomo (simultaneously the Minister of Popular Education, Art and Traditional Culture), until his fall from grace and execution in 1976.

The PUNT's role as the only legal party was enshrined in the 1973 Constitution. The statutes of the PUNT were elaborated, according to what is said, by an advisor of Macías, Antonio García-Trevijano. According to the National Alliance for Democratic Restoration (ANRD), it was García-Trevijano who suggested Macías to add "the Workers" to the name of the party in 1971. Other authors posit that Macías was inspired to make this change by Marien Ngouabi, then-President of the People's Republic of the Congo, or was potentially inspired by the name of the Workers' Party of Korea.

In the 1973 parliamentary election, the PUNT won all of the seats in the legislature, and Macías was reelected unopposed in the presidential election.

The youth wing of the party, called "Youth in March with Macías" (formerly known as "Popular Revolutionary Militia") played an important role, both propagandist and repressive one. The party also had a women's wing, called "Feminine Section", based on the Sección Femenina of the FET y de las JONS in Francoist Spain. Set up by Marina Alene Mbá, the women's wing had the function of organizing events and activities, and the women who belonged it had to be informants for the authorities about the political activity of their families. The President of Guinea Ahmed Sékou Touré sent two advisers to the country to help organize this body.

From the very moment of its creation, the PUNT acquired great social significance. The party membership card was required for everything: academic fees, work contracts, etc. It was also mandatory to wear the official PUNT uniform, with an effigy of President Macías placed at the height of the heart, to show fidelity and love to the dictator. The party membership card was as important as the personal identity document, and could be requested by the authorities at any time and place. In addition, the party had the power to make decisions in legal matters, such as judging, condemning and absolving.

"I, Guinean Militant of the PUNT, swear by God and on my honor to fight, until death if necessary, for the territorial integrity of Equatorial Guinea, against colonialism, neocolonialism, imperialism, technological colonialism, separatism, misery and coups..."

— Party card of the PUNT.

According to Article 4 of the Statute of the PUNT, all citizens of Equatorial Guinea became members of the PUNT from the age of seven.

The party was banned by the Supreme Military Council following the 1979 coup d'état, led by Teodoro Obiang Nguema Mbasogo, nephew of Macías.

== Electoral history ==
=== Presidential elections ===
Election	Party candidate	Votes	%	Result
1973	Francisco Macías Nguema	Unknown	Unknown	Elected ✓

=== Chamber of Deputies elections ===
Election	Party leader	Seats	+/–	Position	Result
1973	Francisco Macías Nguema	60 / 60	New	New	Sole legal party
