= 1979 Equatorial Guinea coup d'état =

Military overthrow of President Francisco Macías Nguema

- Part of decolonisation of Africa and the Cold War
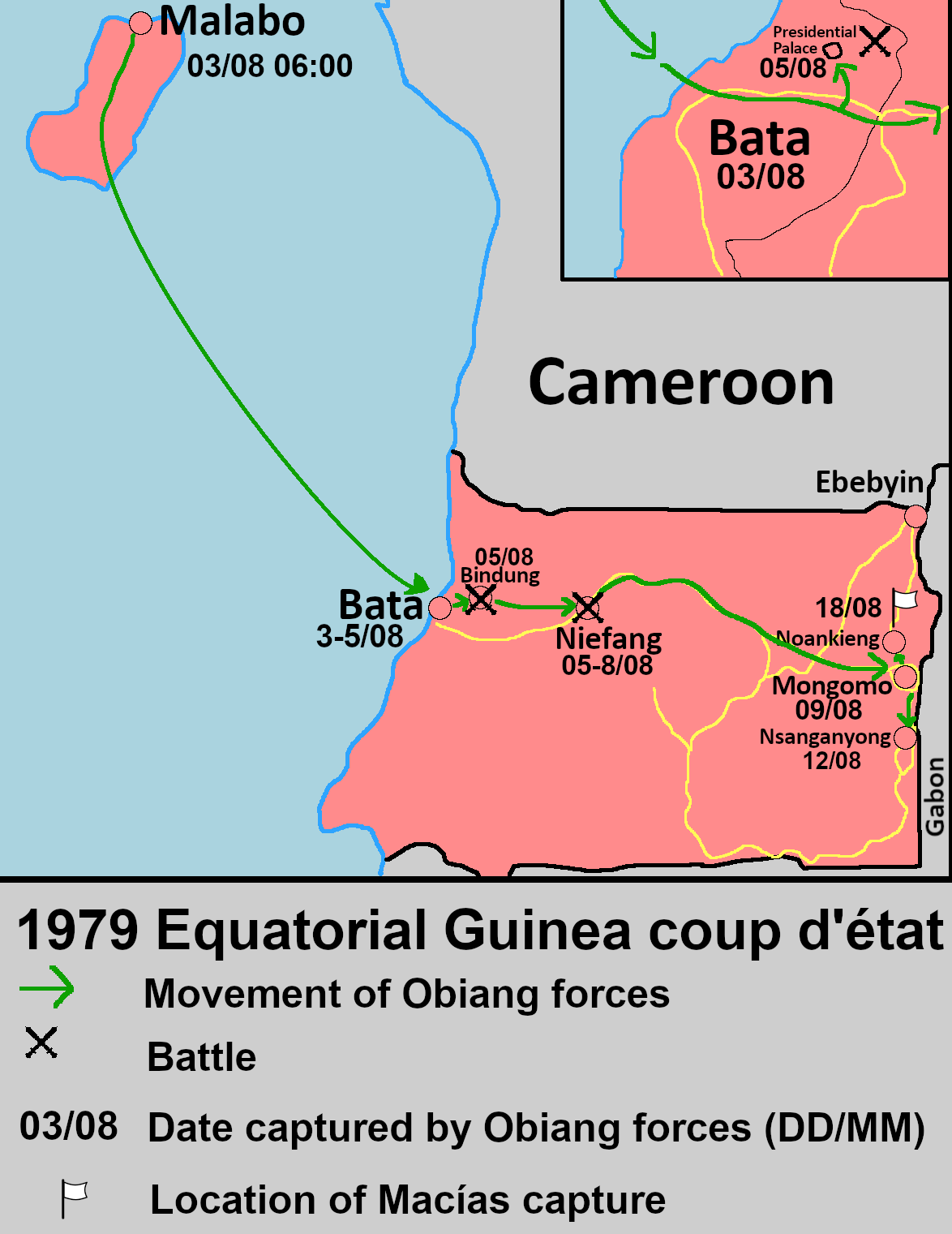
- Map of the 1979 Equatorial Guinea coup d'état
Date	3–18 August 1979
Location	Malabo, Equatorial Guinea 3°45′7.43″N 8°46′25.32″E
Result	Coup attempt succeeds: Francisco Macías Nguema is imprisoned, tried, and executed on 29 September 1979, along with six of his allies

Belligerents
Government of Equatorial Guinea	Supreme Military Council; Diplomatic Support; Spain

Commanders and leaders
Francisco Macías Nguema (executed)	Teodoro Obiang Nguema Mbasogo

Casualties and losses
- About 400 total killed
- Nexus of coup in Malabo (marked in green), Equatorial Guinea

On 3 August 1979, Teodoro Obiang Nguema Mbasogo staged a bloody coup d'état against his uncle, Francisco Macías Nguema, the president of Equatorial Guinea. Fighting between loyalists and rebels continued until Macías Nguema was captured fleeing Equatorial Guinea for Cameroon on 18 August. He was sentenced to death for the crime of genocide against the Bubi people and other crimes committed. Macías Nguema was executed by firing squad on 29 September 1979. Teodoro has remained leader since then, initially as chairman of the Revolutionary Military Council and Supreme Military Council and subsequently as president.

== Background ==
After Francoist Spain granted Equatorial Guinea independence in 1968, a power struggle between Macías and Atanasio Ndongo Miyone led to the former assuming the presidency. Ndongo attempted a coup the following year; he was captured and executed, and the backlash to the presumed Spanish involvement in the coup led to a mass exodus of Spanish natives from the country. Macías subsequently consolidated national political authority, making himself the totalitarian dictator of the country. Macías' reign as dictator was marked by his extensive use of state violence against his political opponents, Nigerian migrant workers, and minority ethnic groups, particularly the Bubi people. An estimated 35,000–50,000 people died during Macías' time in power, many of them in mass killings or imprisonment in the country's notorious prison camps. By 1979, 25% of the country's population lived in exile.

== The coup ==
In the summer of 1979, Macías ordered several members of his own family killed. This led Obiang and several other members of Macías' inner circle to fear that Macías was no longer acting rationally. Obiang was Macías' nephew, as well as the brother of one of the victims.

Obiang, who also served as deputy defense minister, overthrew his uncle on 3 August 1979. The coup was backed by the nation's military and Macías' Cuban palace guard; several foreign embassies, including those of Spain and the United States, were aware of the plot in advance and provided financial humanitarian aid in its aftermath. Upon his ousting, Macías and his personal bodyguard fled to Macías' home village of Nzeng-Ayong and took up residence in a fortified bunker protected by military loyalists. The ensuing conflict between Obiang and Macías' forces killed 400 people; it ended when Macías burned his personal treasury and fled toward the Cameroonian border. A force led by naval commander Florencio Mayé captured Macías on 18 August, and he and six of his allies were executed on 29 September. Obiang has remained president of Equatorial Guinea since the coup.

== See also ==
- 2004 Equatorial Guinea coup attempt
