= Spanish Guinea =

Former Spanish colony in West Africa

Coordinates: 1°35′N 10°21′E

Spanish Territories on the Gulf of Guinea Territorios Españoles del Golfo de Guinea (Spanish)
- 1778–1968
- Coat of arms

- Location of Spanish Guinea in Africa
- Status: Dependencies of Spain (1858–1926); Colony of Spain (1926–1956); Province of Spain (1956–1968)
- Capital: Santa Isabel
- Common languages: Spanish (official); Annobonese Creole; Pichinglis; Fang
- Religion: Catholicism
- Monarch and Caudillo
  - 1858–1868 (first): Isabella II
  - 1936–1968 (last): Francisco Franco
- Governor-General
  - 1858–1859 (first): Carlos Chacon y Michelina
  - 1966–1968 (last): Víctor Suances y Díaz del Río
- Historical era: New Imperialism; World War I; World War II; Cold War
  - Treaty of El Pardo: 11 March 1778
  - Spanish evacuate Fernando Po: 1780
  - Spanish sovereignty reasserted over Fernando Po: 1844
  - Protectorate established over Río Muni: 1885
  - Definitive territorial delimitation by the Treaty of Paris: 1900
  - Administrative union of the various colonies: 1926
  - Independence: 13 October 1968
- Currency: Spanish peseta
Preceded by
Governorate of Fernando Po
Fang people
Elobey, Annobón, and Corisco
Succeeded by
Republic of Equatorial Guinea (1968–1979)
- Today part of: Equatorial Guinea

Spanish Guinea (Spanish: Guinea Española) was a set of insular and continental territories controlled by Spain from 1778 in the Gulf of Guinea and on the Bight of Bonny, in Central Africa. It gained independence in 1968 as Equatorial Guinea.

== Name ==
From the resumption of Spanish sovereignty in 1843, and until 1904, the colony went by various names in official documents. The name of the colony in an 1868 royal decree that outlined the administration of the colony was the Spanish Possessions on the Gulf of Guinea. The other name commonly used was the name Colony of Fernando Poo and Dependencies. In a royal decree in 1904, the official name became Spanish Territories on the Gulf of Guinea as many of the administrative inefficiencies in the previous decrees were rectified. This was reaffirmed in a 1935 decree. In 1956, the colony became the Province of the Gulf of Guinea, a province of Spain.

== History ==
=== 18th–19th centuries ===
Evolution of Spanish possessions and claims in the Gulf of Guinea (1778-1968).

The Spanish colony in the Guinea region was established in 1778, by the Treaty of El Pardo between the Spanish Empire and the Portuguese Empire. Between 1778 and 1810, Spain administered the territory of Equatorial Guinea via its colonial Viceroyalty of the Río de la Plata, based in Buenos Aires (in present-day Argentina).

From 1827 to 1843, the United Kingdom had a base on Bioko to combat the continuing Atlantic slave trade conducted by Spain and illegal traders. Based on an agreement with Spain in 1843, Britain moved its base to its own colony of Sierra Leone in West Africa. In 1844, on restoration of Spanish rule, it became known as the Territorios Españoles del Golfo de Guinea. In 1858, Captain Carlos Chacón arrived in Fernando Po to assume office as the first Governor of the Spanish territories.

=== 20th century ===
Some maps of Spanish Guinea

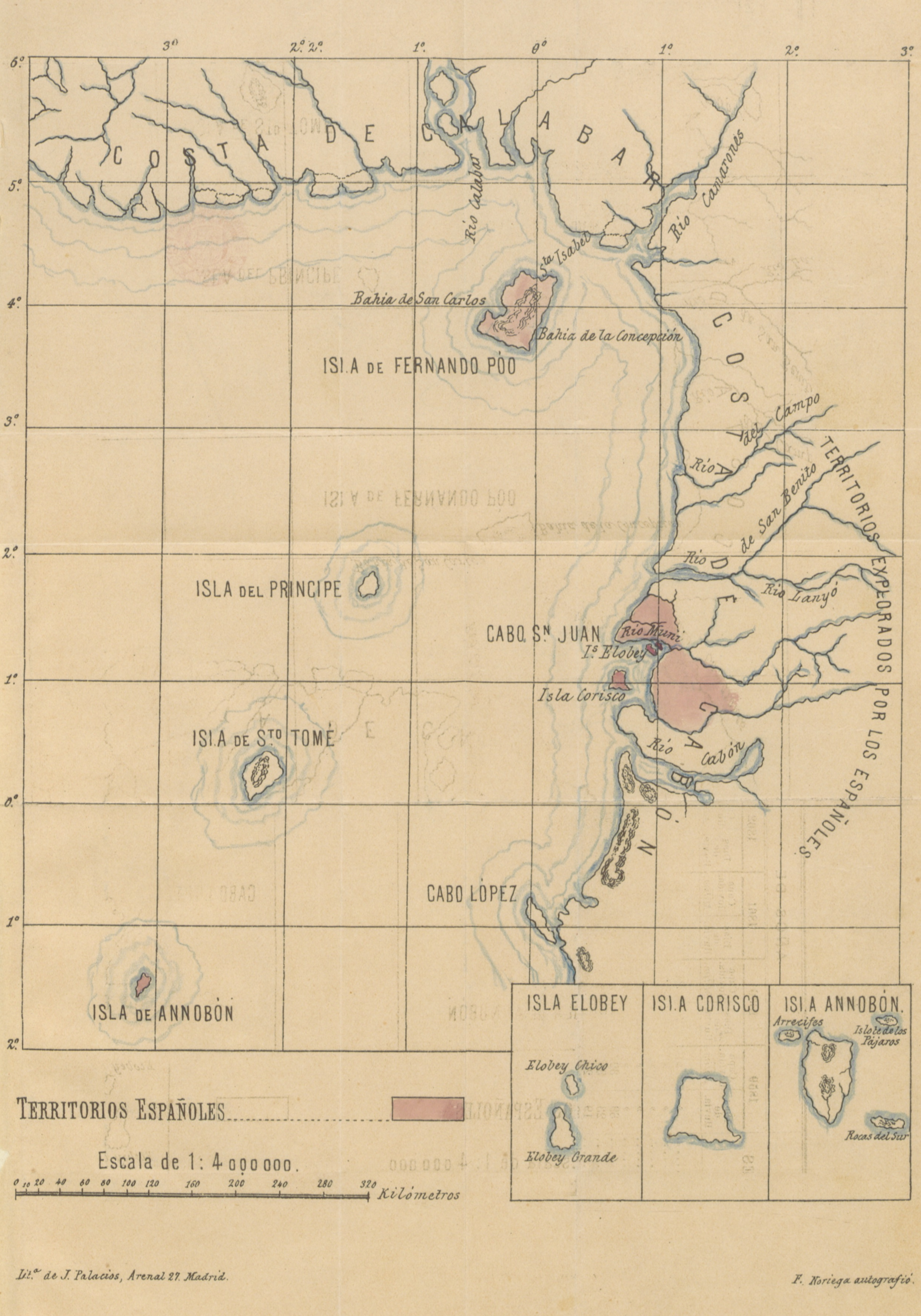
Spanish possessions in the Gulf of Guinea in 1897.

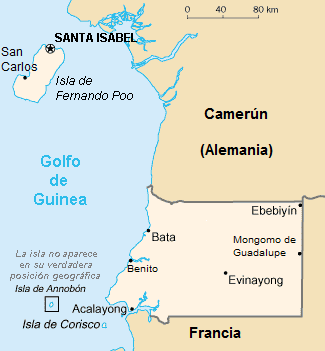
Spanish Guinea after Treaty of Paris of 1900.

Río Muni, continental part of Spanish Guinea, 1903.

Spain had never undertaken colonial settlement of the large area in the Bight of Biafra to which it had treaty rights. The French expanded their occupation at the expense of the area claimed by Spain. By the treaty of Paris in 1900, Spain was left with the continental enclave of Río Muni, 26,000 km^{2} of the 300,000 stretching east to the Ubangi river, which the Spaniards had previously claimed.

In 1959, Spain declared Guinean "acculturation" complete, passing a law which declared Guineans to have equal rights with European Spaniards. It also reclassified the territory as the "Equatorial Region" of Spain, and split it into two provinces: Fernando Poo and Río Muni. However, this law also returned power over Spanish Guinea to the direct control of the presidency, reinforcing the second-class status of Guinean self-governance compared to the European Spanish regions.

In 1963, the Regime of Autonomy (Spanish: Regimen de Autonomía a de Guinea Ecuatorial) was instituted in Spanish Guinea, as a compromise step toward autonomy. Approved by a 1963 referendum, this new system reduced international pressure on Spain by granting the colony a degree of formal self-governance. In some sense, this was illusory, as the new regime reinforced much of the previous colonial governmental structure but with a more palatable appearance. However, the political process in which these changes took place also introduced local political groups into the government and served as a springboard for the independence movement.

After five years of increased movement toward independence under the Regime of Autonomy, the colony formally gained independence in 1968. A constitution committee drafted a constitution throughout late 1967 and early 1968, releasing a final version on 22 June 1968. That constitution was approved by referendum in August 1968. Francisco Macías Nguema won the presidential election in September, and Spain formally handed power to the new government on 12 October 1968.

=== Agricultural economy ===
Toward the end of the 19th century, Spanish, Portuguese, German and Fernandino planters started developing large cacao plantations on the island of Fernando Po. With the indigenous Bubi population decimated by disease and forced labour, the island's economy came to depend on imported agricultural contract workers.

A labour treaty was signed with the Republic of Liberia in 1914; the transport of up to 15,000 workers by sea was orchestrated by the German Woermann-Linie, the major shipping company. In 1930 an International Labour Organization (ILO) commission discovered that Liberian contract workers had "been recruited under conditions of criminal compulsion scarcely distinguishable from slave raiding and slave trading". The government prohibited recruiting of Liberian workers for Spanish Guinea.

The persisting labour shortage in the cacao, coffee and logging industries led to a booming trade in illegal canoe-based smuggling of Igbo and Ibibio workers from the Eastern Provinces of Nigeria. The number of clandestine contract workers on the island of Fernando Po grew to 20,000 in 1942. A labour treaty was signed with the British Crown in the same year. This led to a continuous stream of Nigerian workers going to Spanish Guinea. By 1968 at the time of independence, almost 100,000 ethnic Nigerians were living and working in Spanish Guinea.

==== Colony of Spanish Guinea ====
Coat of arms of the Portuguese and Spanish Guinea.

Coat of arms of the Spanish Río Muni colony.

Between 1926 and 1959, the Crown united Bioko and Río Muni as the "colony of Spanish Guinea". The economy was based on the exploitation of the commodity crops of cacao and coffee, produced at large plantations, in addition to logging concessions. Owners of these companies hired mostly immigrant contract labour from Liberia, Nigeria, and Cameroon. Spain mounted military campaigns in the 1920s to subdue the indigenous Fang people, as Liberia was trying to reduce recruiting of its workers. The Crown established garrisons of the Colonial Guard throughout the enclave by 1926, and the whole colony was considered 'pacified' by 1929.

Río Muni had a small population, officially put at a little over 100,000 in the 1930s. Its people could easily escape over the borders into Cameroon or Gabon. Moreover, the timber companies needed growing amounts of labour, and the spread of coffee cultivation offered an alternative means of paying taxes.

The island of Fernando Po continued to suffer from labour shortages. The French only briefly permitted recruitment in Cameroon. Planters began to recruit Igbo laborers, who were smuggled in canoes from Calabar, Nigeria. Fernando Po was developed after the Second World War as one of Africa's most productive agricultural areas.

Pictures of Spanish Guinea

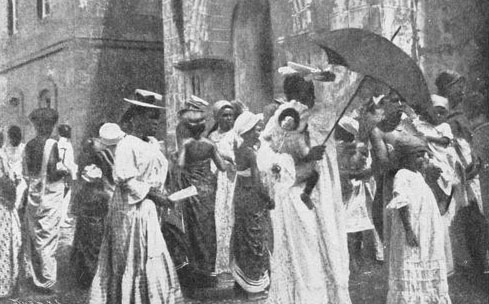
Corisco in 1910.

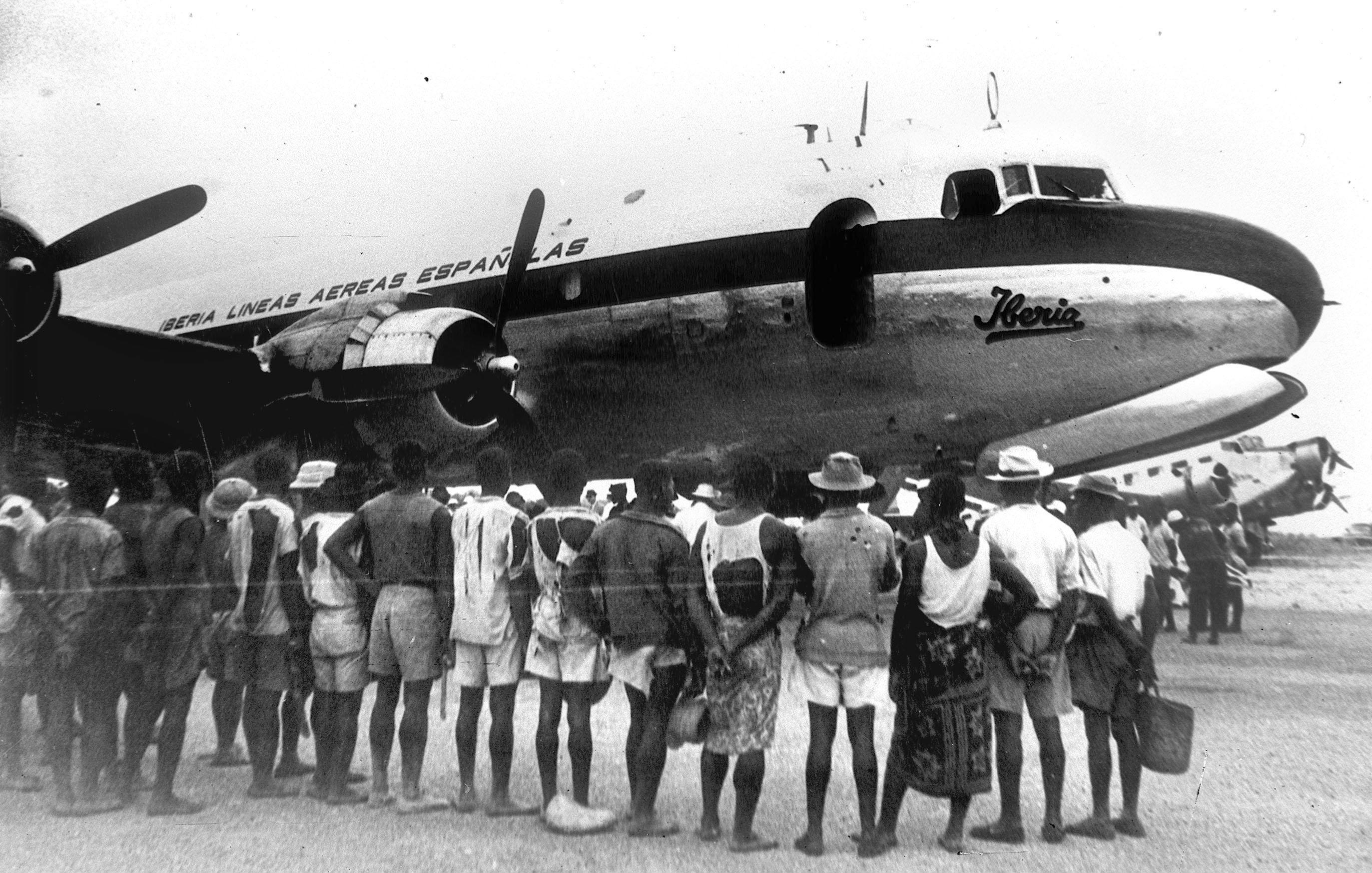
Inaugural flight with Iberia from Madrid to Bata in 1941.

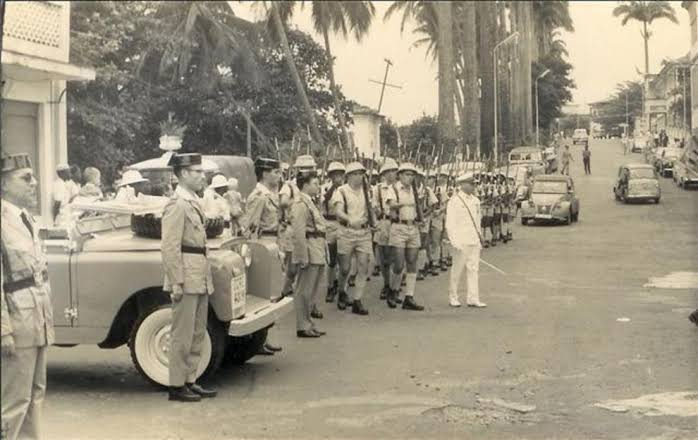
Marine Infantry in Spanish Guinea in 1964.

==== Decolonisation ====
The post-war political history of Spanish Guinea had three fairly distinct phases. From 1946 to 1959, it had the status of a "province", having been raised from "colony", after the Portuguese Empire made overtures to take it over. From 1960 to 1968, Spain tried a system of partial decolonisation to keep the province within the Spanish territorial system, which failed owing to continued anti-colonial activity by Guineans. On 12 October 1968, Spain conceded the independence of the Republic of Equatorial Guinea. Francisco Macías Nguema was elected as president.

Independence of Spanish Guinea

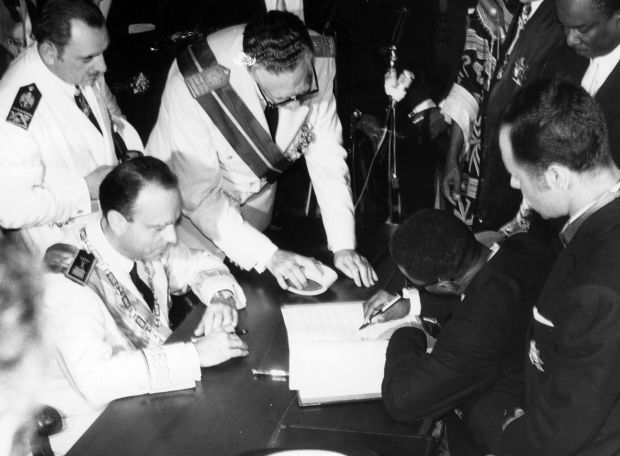
Signing of the independence of Equatorial Guinea by Spanish government on 12 October 1968.

== Colonial demographics ==
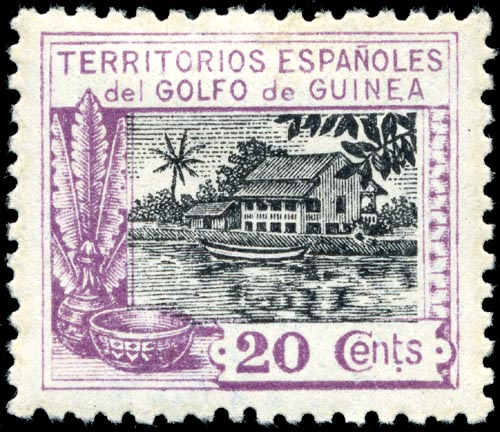
20c stamp of 1924.

The population of the Colony of Spanish Guinea was stratified (before slavery was abolished). The system was somewhat similar to the one operating in the French, English and Portuguese colonies in the rest of Africa:

1. Peninsulares — White Spanish population, whose immigration was regulated by the Spanish government.
2. Emancipados — Black African population, assimilated into the Peninsulares' culture via Spanish Catholic educations. Some were descended from freed Cuban slaves, repatriated to Africa after emancipation and abolition of slavery by the Spanish Royal Orders of 13 September 1845 (voluntary), and of 20 June 1861 (deported). The latter group included mestizos (indigenous-European) and mulattoes (African-European), mixed-race descendants who had been acknowledged by a white Peninsular father.
3. Fernandinos — Creole peoples, multi-ethnic or multi-race populations, often speaking the local Pidgin English of Spanish Guinea's island of Fernando Po (now known as Bioko).
4. "Individuals of colour" under patronage — included the majority of the indigenous Black African people, and those mestizos−mulattoes who were not acknowledged by white fathers and were being deported from the Americas. Of the indigenous ethnic groups in Guinea, most were Bubi and Bantu peoples such as the Fang of Rio Muni.
5. Others — primarily Nigerian, Cameroonian, Han Chinese, and Indian peoples who were hired as contract laborers under types of indentures.

== See also ==
- Dominican Spanish
- Afro-Dominicans
- White Dominicans
- Dominican Americans
- Washington Heights, Manhattan
- Alfonso XII
- Royal Palace of Madrid
- Spanish immigration to Cuba
- Captaincy General of Cuba
- Spanish Sahara
- Spanish protectorate in Morocco
