= Benga =

Benga may refer to:

== Ethnonym ==
- Benga people, an indigenous ethnic group of Equatorial Guinea
- Benga language, spoke by the Benga people
- Benga music, a genre of music originating in Kenya

== Places ==
=== Romania ===
- Benga, the old name of Movileni, Olt, a commune in Romania

=== Gabon ===
- Benga, Gabon, a province of Nyanga Province
- Benga, Mozambique, a town in Mozambique

== People ==
- Benga (surname)
- Benga (musician) (born 1986), English dubstep producer

== Other uses ==
- Benga tree, a common name for Pterocarpus marsupium
- Beng language of Côte d'Ivoire
