= Okuyi =

Bantu coming-of-age ritual

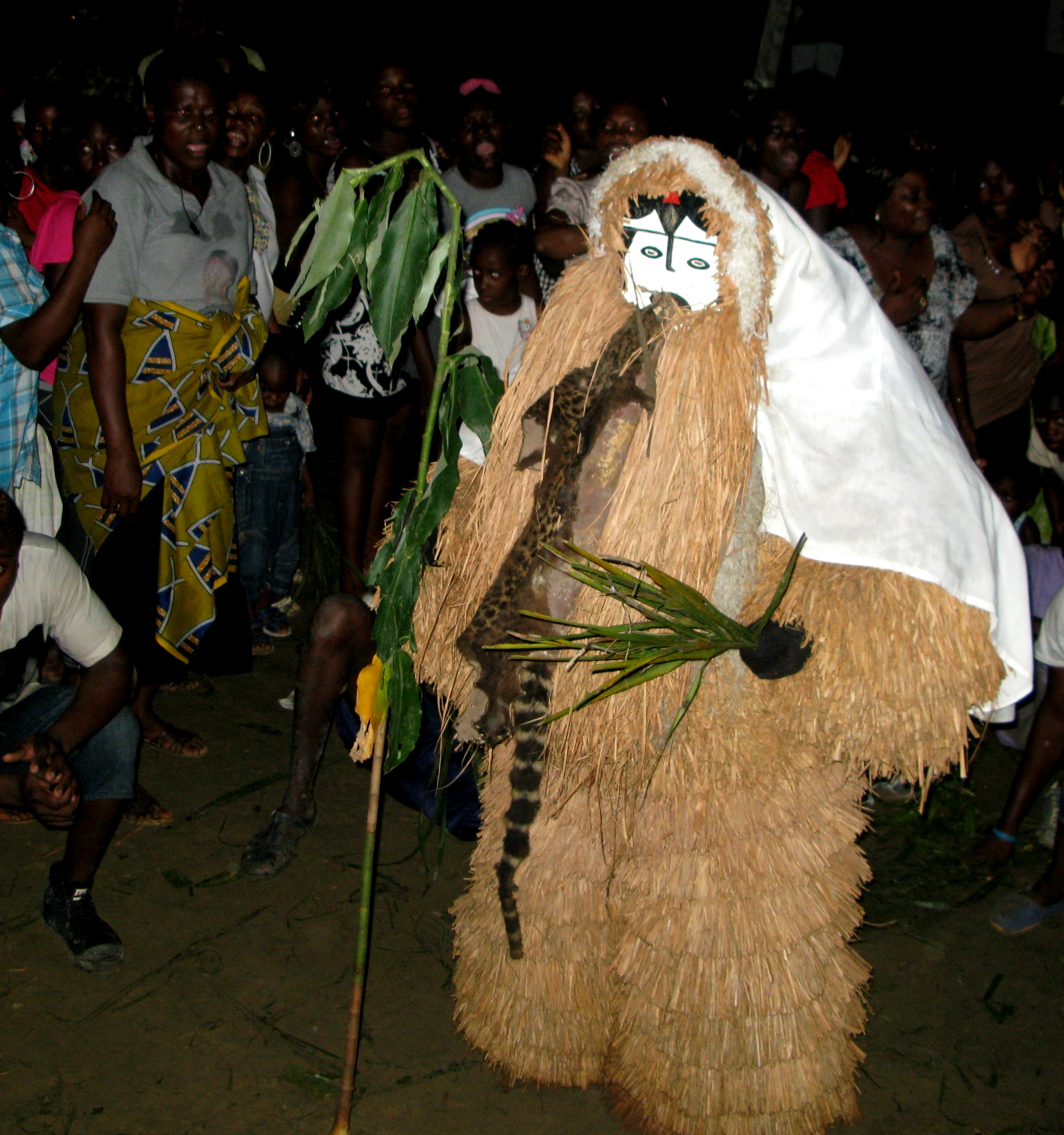
- Ukuyi performer in Bata, Equatorial Guinea

Regions with significant populations
- Gabon, Cameroon, Equatorial Guinea

Religions
- Fetishism

Languages
- Ndowe, Benga, Myene

The Okuyi (plural: Mekuyo, also known as Ukuyi, Ocuya, Okukwe (Gabon) in Equatorial Guinea (Spanish): Mamarracho is a rite of passage practised by several Bantu ethnic groups in different countries mainly across the west coast of Central Africa. Some of the countries where the rite is exercised include Cameroon, Gabon and Equatorial Guinea. Traditionally, the rite is performed at numerous special occasions including initiations, funerals and weddings. Usually when an infant reaches four months of age or when a child becomes an adolescent, a ritual is applied as well. The coastal community known as Ndowe, also known as playeros, is a primary example, as peoples across Equatorial Guinea frequently perform the ritual in public. Gabon has two chief ethnic groups that exercise the okukwe rite including the Mpongwe and the Galwa from Lambaréné, Gabon.

The history of the Mekuyo can be traced back to Gabon. The dance is believed to have originated from the rites of passages initiated by western and southern ethnic groups like the Mpongwe and from the Galwa region. It was in the mid-nineteenth century when the Benga people, who are both native to Gabon and Equatorial Guinea, introduced the ethnic performance to the island of Corisco and Cabo San Juan. At the end of the century, the coastal group of the Kombe people had extended the routine to Mbini. By the beginning of the twentieth century, several clans in Bata had embraced the Mekuyo tradition. Throughout the Mekuyo’s history there have been several famous Ukuyi performers. Some of the most famous from Equatorial Guinea such as Alonga from Corisco and Boso bua Ndondjo from Mbini. Well known Okuyi dancers from the Litoral Province include Kungulu, Ngadi, Aduma and Ngüende a limba, and Santiago Adumanjenje from Ekuku.

== Costume ==
The typical Okuyi performer wears a large, loose costume that is said to resemble the spirit of the clan members’ ancestors. The ancestors are illustrated by the dancers as tranquil and serene and suggest that they were the people who safeguarded, counselled, and educated them from the residence of the deceased. Okuyi costumes are made either from the raffia palm, a tree native to tropical African nations, or bamboo. In the process of manufacture, the underlying outfit is produced using the woven fabric hessian. The thick textile forms the suit for the performer. After that design is complete, the material is covered by frills made from raffia palm which are woven into the hessian fabric. Performers usually wear black socks made of cotton on their feet as well as on their hands. Every dancer carries through his presentation wearing a mask made of a soft local wood known in Ndowe as ikuka (Alstonia congensis), a species from the evergreen tree genus Alstonia.

In Gabon, the styles and colors generally remain the same throughout the country but in Equatorial Guinea, the types change depending on the location within the country. Hanging down from the mouth of the Okuyi is the skin of the servaline genet (Genetta servalina), o musingi a small forest cat. The skin has the role of protecting the Okuyi from bad spirits that threaten him. There is a relation with the Egyptian mythology of the feline type accompanying the journey of the soul of the dead, to the underworld. For the dead Okuyi who embodies the soul as well from the underworld symbolised by the genetta skin hanging from the mouth of the mask. The face mask on each performer is essential to identify the Okuyi. In Equatorial Guinea masks differ from one another, but in Gabon the design has been kept constant since the nineteenth century. The design is basically a black chin and a black forehead with white covering the cheeks and upper face sides. The dark red eyes remain closed, as a sign that the person represented is dead. This contrasts with masks from Equatorial Guinea as the face masks range from geometrical forms to human faces. The majority of the masks have the eyes closed and few have them open. Some masks that Mekuyo wear have a mirror attached on the forehead which also is used as a talisman. Mekuyo dancers also wear a cape known as an ekapa which is usually white and often features not only the name of the Okuyi dancer but also his birthplace and birth date.

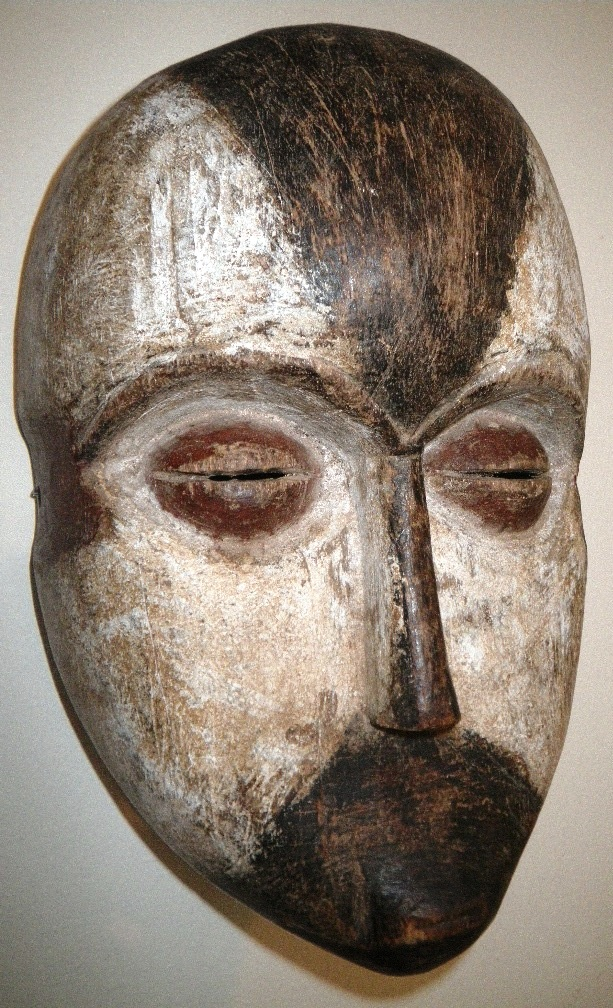
Okuyi mask from Gabon

In Equatorial Guinea, there are commonly three principal colours painted on the wooden mask: white, red and black. The black on the mask typically symbolises darkness and death. The red displays the fight a person must perform during life, the strength needed to do so, the blood involved and the birth. The white demonstrates life, semen and the ancestors which the mask is supposed to portray.

== Rituals ==
In Equatorial Guinea, performances generally last approximately three hours, from 4:00 p.m. to 7:00 p.m. on Sundays. Performances usually consist of the Ukuyi dancer dancing in short and fast episodes as he stomps his feet on the ground usually to a beat played by three drums and wooden sticks. At the same time, a female chorus sing in the background chanting greetings and welcomes to the Mekuyo. Usually the Okuyi holds palm leaves or a tall ibito (costus afer) branches or spears which gives them balance. The malanga leaves known as poto are used as a medium to plant the ibito. Palm branches are used to bless the members of the audience. The ibito is traditionally planted into the ground by the Mekuyo at the beginning of the ceremony in front of the chorus (west side of the eboka). The base of the ibito plant has a sack held by several poto leaves holding local sand, numerous barks from a variety of trees and other materilas. This is supposed to provide security for the Mekuyo as well as for the members of the crowd.

In all performances, the Mekuyo are assisted by the Mboni, which are a group of initiated young men who have the responsibility to care and assist the Mekuyo and encourage the dancing and singing. The Mboni also have the job to groom and carry the masks. The Okuyi’s identity is strictly secret and nobody in the audience is meant to know who is under the costume. The Mboni might become an Okuyi in the future. They are typically meant to be very agile and skilful dancers and musicians as well.

=== For infants ===
One of the most common types of rituals is for new mothers (djae) and their babies. When an infant reaches about four months of age, it is taken for a Mekuyo rite of passage where it enters another stage of his or her life. In the past, the Ukuyi used to take the baby from the mother and most of the time the baby didn't cry. As the baby was entering its new stage, a chorus was chanted around the baby. Together they sang several songs, one of them being a tune about a panther taking the baby. However, in the present, the mother is permitted to hold the infant at all times in most of the rites. The actual ritual involves the mother and child being placed in the centre of the ring surrounded by the chorus and the audience, the mother holds the baby and sits on a chair. The Okuyi points at the baby as a way to bless them. Then, water which has been previously placed in a bucket is sprinkled on the baby using palm leaves. The Okuyi dances around the baby and mother as they sit.

=== Funerals ===
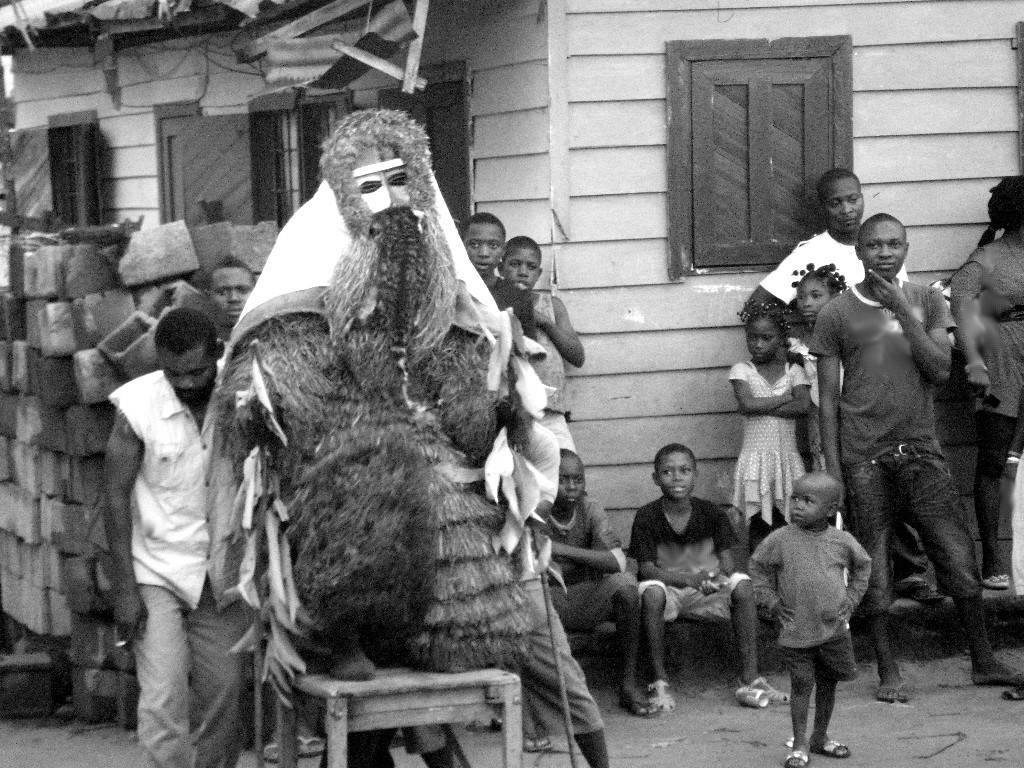
Ukuyi during a performance in Equatorial Guinea

The Mekuyo are known for their intermittent dances. In funeral performances the primary mourner traditionally sits on a chair in the middle of an open area and surrounding him or her is an Okuyi dancing in his normal method similar to the new mother's rite "djae". Like during most of the dances, the Mekuyo uses the palm, fern leaves or skins to bless both the mourner and the members of the audience.

=== Music ===
The songs featured in the Mekuyo presentations are normally in a polyrhythmic style. The instruments used are a certain type of drum known as Ngoma drums with the biggest kind being named the monduma. Traditionally, these drums used to be buried in the trunk of various banana trees. It is this that caused the sound to be heard as a deeper pitch. This was accompanied by the mosomba drum or, as it was called by the Kombe people, the ikubi. However, substitutes for drums are often used. One of the most common alternatives is a metal bucket filled with stones.

Chants that are sung with the instruments are sometimes done in the old Benga language, proving incomprehensible for the actual people who perform them and listen to them. Often however, the tunes are sung in Kombe, the Ndowe language of the people who chant them. The songs’ introductions are commenced by the men who give the first opening tones, then the women follow. Women are the key voices of the chorus in Mekuyo dances as the Okuyi requires the female voice to dance appositely. The songs are an important way to communicate culture. This information is then passed to others through the singing and used as an expression to form a frame of the dances of the Mekuyo.
