= Equatoguinean nationality law =

Parliament of Equatorial Guinea
- Long title: Ley no.3/2.011, de fecha 14 de julio, Reguladora de la Nacionalidad Equatoguineana
- Enacted by: Government of Equatorial Guinea
- Status: Current legislation

Equatoguinean nationality law is regulated by the Constitution of Equatorial Guinea, as amended; the Equatoguinean Nationality Regulation, and its revisions; and various international agreements to which the country is a signatory. These laws determine who is, or is eligible to be, a national of Equatorial Guinea. The legal means to acquire nationality, formal legal membership in a nation, differ from the domestic relationship of rights and obligations between a national and the nation, known as citizenship. Equatoguinean nationality is typically obtained under the principle of jus soli, i.e. by birth in Equatorial Guinea, or jus sanguinis, born to parents with Equatoguinean nationality. It can be granted to persons with an affiliation to the country, or to a permanent resident who has lived in the country for a given period of time through naturalization.

== Acquisition of nationality ==
Nationality can be acquired in Equatorial Guinea at birth or later in life through naturalization.

=== By birth ===
Those who acquire nationality at birth include:

- Children born anywhere who have at least one parent who is an Equatoguinean national by birth. or

=== By naturalization ===
Naturalization can be granted to persons who have resided in the territory for a sufficient period of time to confirm they understand Spanish or another language used in the country, and the customs and traditions of the society. General provisions are that applicants have good character and conduct; have no criminal convictions within or outside of the country; have no communicable diseases; have paid taxes and social security contributions; and have continuously resided in the country for forty years. Besides foreigners meeting the criteria, other persons who may be naturalized include:

- The legal spouse of an Equatoguinean national after ten years of residency and cohabitation in the territory;
- Persons born in Equatorial Guinea who are residents of Equatorial Guinea at the time of majority can naturalize by declaration, if they have continuously lived in the territory for ten years;
- Adopted minors obtain Equatoguinean nationality after completion of legal adoption;
- Persons whose father or mother were born in Equatorial Guinea can acquire nationality after one year of residency; or
- Persons whose grandparents were born in Equatorial Guinea who are under parental authority of an Equatoguinean can acquire nationality after a two-year residency while a minor, or within one year of attaining majority.

== Loss of nationality ==
Equatoguinean nationals can renounce their nationality pending approval by the state. Nationality which has been renounced can be reacquired by petitioning the Ministry of Justice, Religious Affairs and Penitentiary Institutions. Nationals may be denaturalized in Equatorial Guinea for having dual nationality without government authorization or for fraud, misrepresentation, or concealment in a naturalization petition.

== Dual nationality ==
Dual nationality has been allowed in Equatorial Guinea since 2011. Since 1990, it is forbidden for the president to hold multiple nationalities or be a naturalized Equatoguinean.

== History ==
=== Portuguese period (1472–1778) ===
Seeking to discover trade routes to India, the Portuguese explorer Fernão do Pó, sighted the island of Bioko in 1472. He named the island Formosa ("Beautiful"), but it commonly was referred to as "Fernando Po". Within two years, the islands of Annobón, Príncipe, and São Tomé were also charted by the Portuguese. Based on their explorations, by 1480 Portugal had claimed the African coastline between Arguin, in present-day Mauritania, and Cape St. Catherine, in present-day Gabon, as well as the islands of Cape Verde and in the Gulf of Guinea. In 1521, the Ordinances of Manuel I (Portuguese: Ordenações Manuelinas), established that subjects were those born in Portuguese territory and that those leaving the territory without permission of the sovereign was grounds for denaturalization. In 1603, the Ordinances of Philip I (Portuguese: Ordenações Filipinas) established that Portuguese subjects were children born on the Iberian Peninsula or adjacent islands, Brazil, or to an official in service to the crown in the Portuguese possessions of Africa or Asia, whose father was a native of Portugal, or whose mother was a native of Portugal and was married to a foreigner who had established domicile in Portugal for a minimum of ten years. Those who were not in service to the crown in the colonies (except Brazil) were not considered to be Portuguese. A child could not derive nationality directly from its mother unless it was illegitimate.

=== Spanish period (1778–1968) ===
Wishing to reestablish the boundary for their Colony of Brazil which had been set at the 46th meridian west through a series of papal bulls, Queen Maria I of Portugal negotiated with King Charles III of Spain to extend their territory to include Portuguese occupations in the Amazon basin and in southern Brazil. In October 1777, the two crowns agreed to terms in the Treaty of San Ildefonso, which granted South American Spanish colonies to Portugal and the Portuguese West African coastal territories, including Annobón and Fernando Po, to Spain. The following year, Maria and Charles signed the Treaty of El Pardo reconfirming Spanish sovereignty over the two islands and the Bight of Biafra between the mouths of the Niger and Ogoue Rivers. Felipe José de los Santos Toro y Freyre, the Count of Argelejos, was dispatched in 1778 from Montevideo to take possession of and administer the new Spanish territory, but he died within a few days of his arrival. Illness and conflicts with the Portuguese on São Tomé reduced the initial colonizing party of 150 to 26 men, who returned to Montevideo in 1783. The failure of the colonization attempt led to little interest from Spain for its West African possessions for fifty years. They were assigned to the administration of the Viceroyalty of the Río de la Plata, based in Buenos Aires, until 1810 and then the British were leased the territory in 1817.

Spain's first constitution, the Constitution of Cadiz, enacted in 1812, specifically recognized as nationals only "free-men, born and bred up in the Spanish dominions, and their sons". Freedmen from Africa and foreigners residing within Spanish territory were permitted to naturalize as Spanish. The law was passed during the period (1808–1814) when Ferdinand VII of Spain was detained in France and Spanish juntas were organized to govern during his absence. Ferdinand's return to power and proclamation to reestablish an absolute monarchy led to the Spanish American wars of independence. In 1814 upon returning to Spain from captivity in France, Ferdinand VII abrogated the constitution and reinstated an absolute monarchy, leading to independence wars throughout Spanish America. Revolution in 1820 reinstated the Constitution of Cádiz, but the return to power of Ferdinand in 1823, saw it suspended again. Instability in the Spanish empire continued until 1874 with periods of conflict followed by calm only to erupt into insurrection again. The Constitution of Cádiz was reinstated in 1836 and revoked a year later.

In 1839, the British attempted to purchase Annobón and Fernando Po, but a price could not be agreed. When Isabella II ascended to the throne in 1843, she dispatched a commission to reestablish Spanish administration in the territory. Led by Juan José Lerena y Barry, they ordered the expulsion of Baptist missionaries, place names to be renamed in Spanish, and authorized John Beecroft, the British governor, to remain as the administrator of Spanish Guinea, but without pay. On the mainland, Lerena negotiated treaties with local Ndowe chiefs, granting them Spanish nationality, before reaffirming Spanish sovereignty over Annobón and returning to Spain. Upon Beecroft's death in 1854, his assistant James W. B. Lynslager, also British, was appointed by the Spanish crown as administrator of Spanish Guinea. He served until 1858, when he was replaced by a Spaniard, Carlos de Chacón, who established Spanish colonial policy in administrating the territory. From 1858 until 1904, both French and Spanish governments claimed Río Muni, the mainland territory which had been ceded by Portugal to Spain. Though the 1900 Treaty of Paris established boundaries for French and Spanish territories, confusion remained until the Vatican resolved the issue in favor of Spain and appointed a bishop to serve from Santa Isabel.

Two Carlist Wars followed by the 1868 Spanish Revolution, led to a democratic experiment and the drafting of a new constitution in 1869. The constitution called for significant colonial reforms, but before they could be acted upon the Third Carlist War and subsequent restoration of the monarchy ended its authority. A new constitution was adopted in 1876, and in 1889 the first Spanish Civil Code was adopted. The Code was extended to Puerto Rico, Panama, the Philippines and Guam, establishing that nationality was acquired either from birth in Spanish territory or by descent from a Spanish national. Legitimate children could derive nationality from a father, but only illegitimate children could derive Spanish nationality from a mother, as a married woman was required to take the nationality of her husband. It also contained provisions for foreigners to naturalize. In 1904, Spanish administrators began classifying the native inhabitants as indigenous, meaning unassimilated Africans and not entitled to full rights, and emancipated, referring to Fernandinos, mixed-race, assimilated creoles. These statuses were not codified officially for two decades.

The Royal Decree of 17 July 1928 established regulations for the indigenous inhabitants of Spanish Guinea, classifying them as subjects not nationals (Spanish: súbditos no nacionales) of Spain. It divided subjects into those who were governed by Spanish law and those who were subject to customary law and special legislation passed on their behalf by the colonial administration. On 29 September 1938 the Statute of Patronage for Indigenous Persons (Spanish: Estatuto del Patronato de Indígenas) created a guardianship relationship between indigenous persons and the state, wherein native inhabitants were legally incapacitated. The General Ordinance of 1938 (Spanish: Ordenanza General de los Territorios Españoles del Golfo de Guinea) described the colony as a commercial enterprise and specified that the territory was not considered to be part of the Spanish homeland, rather part of its empire. (Note: "Sefiala que en esos años el territorio Guineano se regía por la Ordenanza general de 1938, que to definía como una colonia de explotación mercantil, refiriéndose en su Exposición de Motivos como 'territorios que, sin formar parte del suelo de la patria, están sujeto a su imperio'." For further clarification, the Supreme Court noted, "…espacios fisicos que eran 'territorio españiol' pero no 'territorio nacional españiol', y por lo tanto no se integran dentro del concepto de 'España' que contiene dicha norma legal, limitando la aplicación del criterio del ius soli.") Under regulations passed on 23 December 1944, the General Directorate of Morocco could grant full or limited emancipation based on professional or academic certification. Fully emancipated inhabitants were subject to the Spanish Civil and Commercial, and Penal Codes. Wives and children of fully emancipated natives were able to acquire full emancipation and from 1949, with the passage of Law of 21, received a certificate of their status. Those with limited emancipation had limited access to Spanish legislative protection and those who were not emancipated were subject to colonial administration and tribal custom.

An anti-colonial movement emerged in the 1950s, and in 1959 the status of Fernando Po and Río Muni was changed from colony to province. Legal frameworks which had given different civil status to assimilated and non-assimilated Africans were abandoned and Fernandinos were granted full citizenship in 1959. The change caused the growth of political activism, resulting in Spain granting autonomy to Equatorial Guinea in 1962. Law 191, (Spanish: Ley de bases del Regimen Autónomo de Guinea Ecuatorial) passed in 1963, established the basis of the transition to self-rule and codified that natives of Fernando Po and Río Muni had the same rights and obligations as guaranteed to Spanish nationals under the constitution. Spanish legal scholar and professor, Manuel Peña y Bernaldo de Quirós, clarified that the law did not grant Equatoguineans Spanish nationality; they remained Spanish subjects but with fundamental rights. A referendum was held which approved the scheme as a first step in the process of gaining independence. Decree 1885, issued on 3 July 1964, repealed the 1959 statute, and provided in Chapter II, Article II, that native born nationals of Equatorial Guinea had the same rights as inhabitants of Spain. In 1966, at Spain's invitation a United Nations delegation visited Equatorial Guinea. The majority of inhabitants who appeared before the United Nations sub-committee supported independence. On that basis, the United Nations urged Spain to establish a date, no later than July 1968 to transfer power to the Equatoguinean people.

=== Post-independence (1968–present) ===
Equatorial Guinea gained its independence on 12 October 1968. The 1968 Constitution at the independence of Equatorial Guinea specifically provided for the Africans born in the territory to obtain Equatoguinean nationality. Others who were entitled to be nationals were those described in the Spanish Civil Code, which at the time of independence had last been revised in 1954. Under stipulations of the code, a married woman could retain her nationality if her spouse's country did not automatically bestow nationality upon her. Children obtained nationality from their father, unless the father was stateless, in which case they could derive maternal nationality. If a child was born anywhere to at least one parent who had also been born in the territory, or within the territory to foreigners who did not have diplomatic immunity, they automatically acquired Equatoguinean nationality. Royal Decree 2987 issued on 28 October 1977, acknowledged that some Equatoguineans had Spanish nationality prior to independence and established a formula to retrieve their Spanish status. Due to continuing confusion on the matter of nationality, the Spanish statute provided that Equatoguineans residing in Spain at the time the decree was promulgated had one year, or one year from the date they reached majority, to declare that the wished to be Spanish nationals.

The country's first legislation on nationality, other than provisions in the Constitution was passed in 1990. Under the terms of the 1990 Nationality Regulation, women were unable to facilitate the naturalization of their foreign spouse and automatically acquired the nationality of her spouse upon marriage. Residency to acquire nationality was ten years for most applicants for naturalization, but exceptions existed. For persons who had invested in or provided exemplary service to the nation only five years residency was required and for persons born in Equatorial Guinea or adopted by Equatoguineans, the period was two years. A revision of the Nationality Regulation in 2011 allowed spouses to equally acquire nationality, permitted dual nationality, and simplify rules to acquire nationality at birth, but extended the residency requirement for naturalization to forty years.

In 2020, a case (Repertorio Oficial de Jurisprudencia: STS 2668/2020) brought before the Supreme Court of Spain acknowledged that in Spanish jurisprudence, inhabitants of the former colonies of Equatorial Guinea, Ifni and Western Sahara did not have Spanish nationality. Lacking a Spanish nationality code, the 1889 Civil Code, as amended, determines Spanish nationality and defines persons as Spanish as those descended from a Spaniard or who were stateless or of unknown parentage born in Spain. Because Equatorial Guinea provided for the nationality of inhabitants from independence, Spain granted nationality to those living in Spain in 1977 under limited conditions, and Spanish law allows Equatoguineans a shorter residency requirement to naturalize as Spanish, the Supreme Court ruled that Spanish nationality of origin does not apply to Equatoguineans.
