= Province of Río Muni =

Former province of Spain (1959–1968)

Coordinates: 1°35′N 10°30′E

Río Muni
- Province (1959–1968)
- Coat of arms
- Interactive map of Río Muni
- Country: Spain
- Autonomous Region: Spanish Guinea
- Capital: Bata

Government
  - Body: Provincial Deputation of Río Muni

Area
  - Total: 26,017 km^{2} (10,045 sq mi)

The Province of Río Muni was a Spanish province in Africa between 1959 and 1968. It consisted of Río Muni, the continental region of Spanish Guinea (modern-day Equatorial Guinea), plus the islands of Corisco and Elobey. It bordered Gabon to the east and south and Cameroon to the north. Its administrative capital was Bata. It had an area of 26 017 km².

== History ==
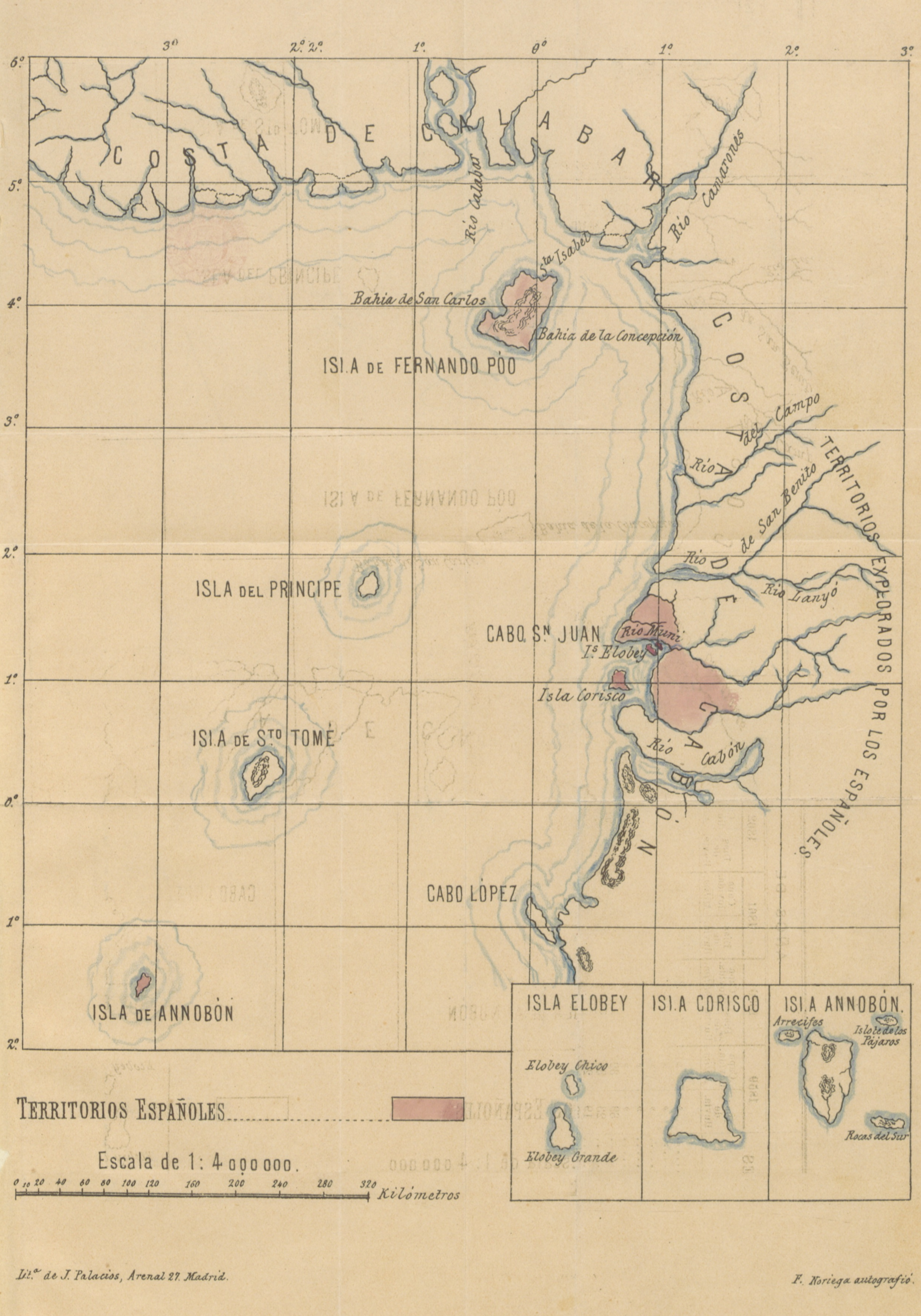
Map of Spanish possessions in the Gulf of Guinea in 1897, before the Treaty of Paris in 1900.

The territory of the province was ceded by Portugal to Spain in 1778. The delimitation of the continental territory was made in the Treaty of Paris of 1900.

It formed a province together with Fernando Poo from 1956 to 1959 as the Spanish Province of the Gulf of Guinea. In 1959, it became the Province of Río Muni within the autonomous region of Equatorial Guinea, a name it kept until its independence from Spain in 1968.

On 1 September 1960 the Provincial Deputation of Río Muni was established in the city of Bata, whose first president was José Vedú.

The province vehicle registration prefix was "RM", established by an Order on 20 June 1961, which was annulled by an Order on 17 March 1969. Previously the prefix was "TEG" (Territorios Españoles del Golfo de Guinea), established by the order of 30 September 1929, territories that were divided into two provinces by the Law of 29 July 1959.

== Ethnicity and geography ==
The ethnic composition of Rio Muni was mostly Fang people, with other Bantu on the coast: Kombe people.

The provincial capital was Bata. Other towns of importance were Evinayong, Ebibeyin, Cogo, Acurenam, Mongomo, Micomeseng, Niefang, Añisoc and Rio Benito.

== Governors ==
- 1960–1961: Manuel Cervera Cabello
- 16 Feb 1961–1964: Víctor Suances Díaz del Río
- 1964–1968: Simón Ngomo Ndumu Asumu

== See also ==
- History of Equatorial Guinea
