= Mbanie Island =

Island of Equatorial Guinea

Native name: Isla de Mbañe
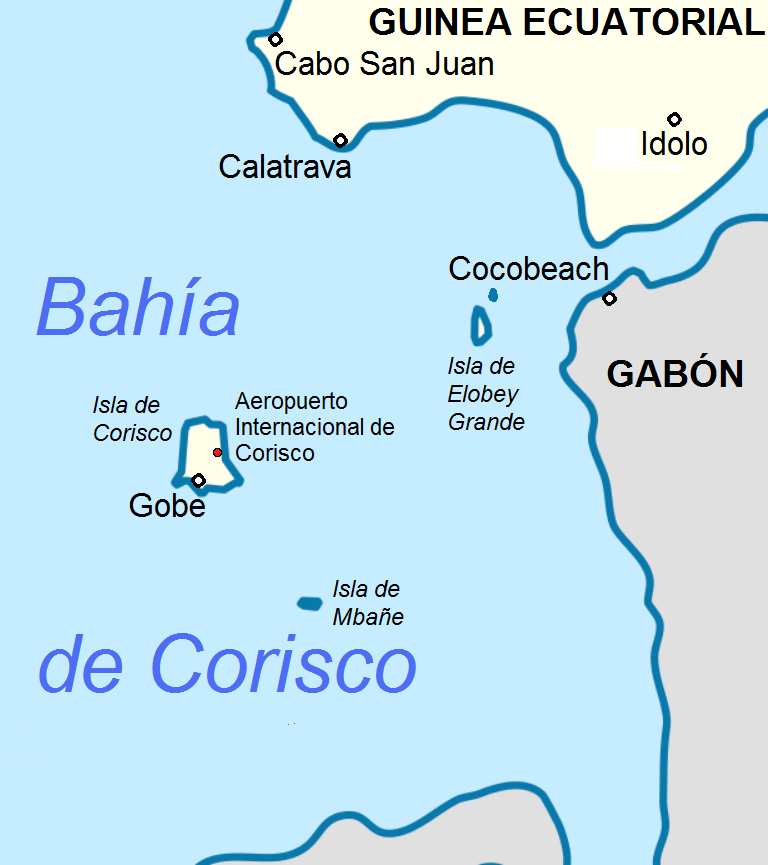
- A Spanish language map showing the location of the island as "Isla de Mbañe" in relation to the rest of Equatorial Guinea

Geography
- Location: Gulf of Guinea
- Coordinates: 0°48′38″N 9°22′46″E

Administration
- Equatorial Guinea
- Province: Litoral
- Area covered: 30 ha (74 acres)

Demographics
- Population: Sparse

Additional information
- Time zone: WAT (UTC+1)

Mbanie Island (Spanish: Mbañe), also referred to as Mbanié, is an island of Equatorial Guinea in the Gulf of Guinea. The island is the largest in an archipelago containing the smaller islands of Conga and Cocoteros. It is 30 ha (74 acres) in area, and only sparsely populated with fishermen. Control of the island and the larger archipelago had been disputed between Equatorial Guinea and Gabon for decades, until the International Court of Justice ruled in 2025 the territory belonged to Equatorial Guinea.

Control of the island was first described in the Treaty of Paris in 1900, which gave control of the territory to Spanish Guinea. After becoming independent as Equatorial Guinea in 1968, the islands were soon after claimed by the neighboring and newly-independent Gabon, which took control of the island through military force four years later in 1972. The invasion defeated the small Equatorial Guinean force stationed on the island and replaced them with Gabonese ones, creating tension between the two nations. Before escalation continued, the Bata Convention in 1974 redrew the territory's borders in favor of Gabon, giving them the islands - however, the original agreement was subsequently lost, with only unsigned copies remaining.

After the discovery of oil around the islands in the early 2000s, tension between the two nations started again, prompting Gabon's Minister of National Defense and the President's son Ali Bongo to visit the island and reassert Gabon's claim, much to the resentment of Equatorial Guinea. Despite diplomatic efforts made by both nations presidents afterwards, no agreements were reached for years, possibly because of outside influence from French and American multinational oil producers favoring different outcomes. In wake of the stalemate, it was decided in 2004 the United Nations would be responsible for mediating the solution, which tasked the job to the International Court of Justice in 2016. After proceedings began in 2021 and lasted until 2025, the ICJ ruled the original Treaty of Paris was valid, and the Bata Convention which had been left unsigned was legally void.

== Geography ==
Mbanie is the largest island of an archipelago in the Gulf of Guinea, also containing the islands Conga and Cocoteros. It is 30 ha (74 acres) in area, and only sparsely populated with fishermen. The closest mainland point to the island is Pointe Mdombo in Gabon, about 30 km (19 mi) away. The archipelago is known to have commercially viable oil reserves in the waters surrounding it, with amounts totaling over "several hundred thousand barrels", according to British expert on oil and gas in Africa Nicholas Shaxson in the early 2000s. Modern-day oil estimates made by S&P Global were created by measuring the product of oil production bordering the disputed area, which amounts to 31,000 barrels of crude per day, and 743 million barrels of oil equivalent in recoverable resources. Large amounts of fish are also believed to be present in the waters surrounding the territory.

== History ==
One of the first mentions of the island was in the 27 June 1900 Treaty of Paris, which defined the territories of the French and Spanish colonies in the region, giving control of the island to Spanish Guinea. In the mid-1950s, a small French presence on the island was discovered and soon after removed by Spanish authorities without protest from France. On 12 October 1968, the colony gained independence from Spain as Equatorial Guinea, and likewise the ownership of the island were transferred to the newly-independent nation. In 1972, the Armed Forces of Gabon invaded and took control of the island from the Armed Forces of Equatorial Guinea troops stationed there, and began to administer it as their own. The short invasion, which saw the President of Gabon Omar Bongo place the flag of Gabon on the island, created "real tension" and a "very complex" situation between the two nations according to French officials, which had to be mediated by the President of Zaire Mobutu Sese Seko. In relation to the island's change in control, on 12 September 1974, the Bata Convention redrew the territories borders in Gabon's favor, giving the island to them. Among other tension, the annexation of the archipelago led the Equatorial Guinea national football team to begin a rivalry with the Gabonese team.

=== Territorial dispute ===
Prominent figures in the territorial dispute

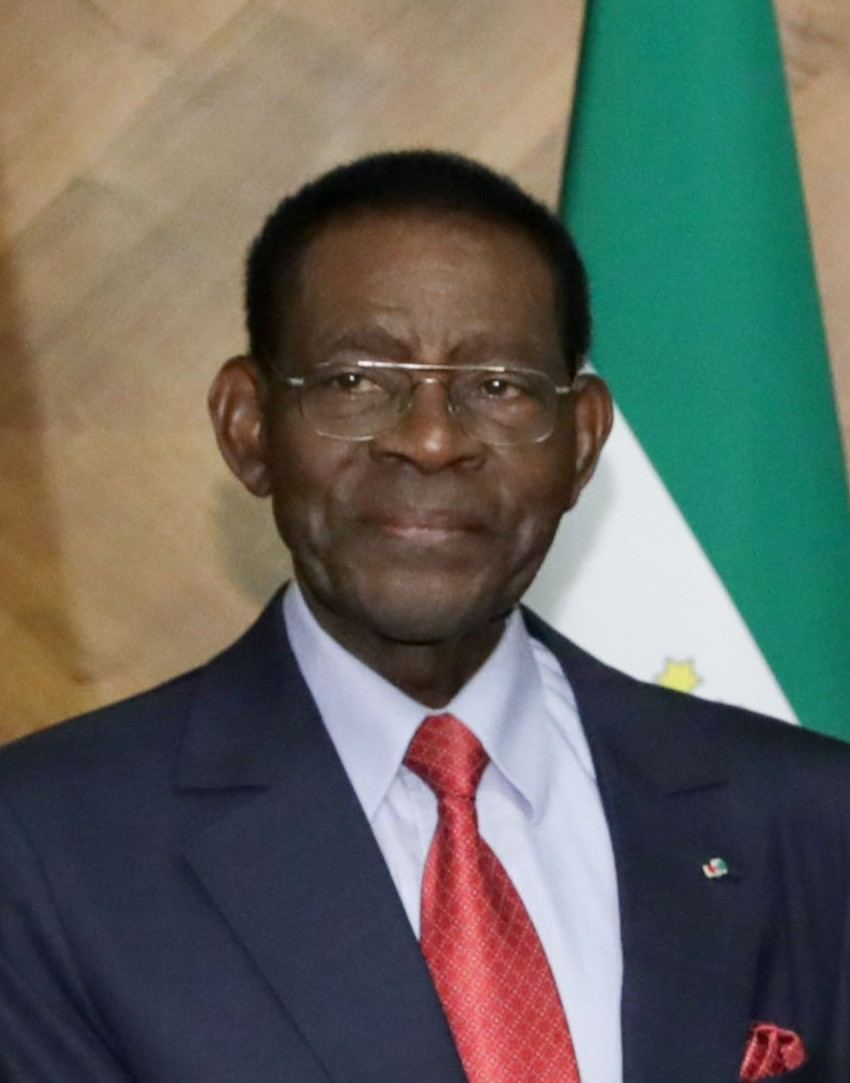
President of Equatorial Guinea Teodoro Obiang

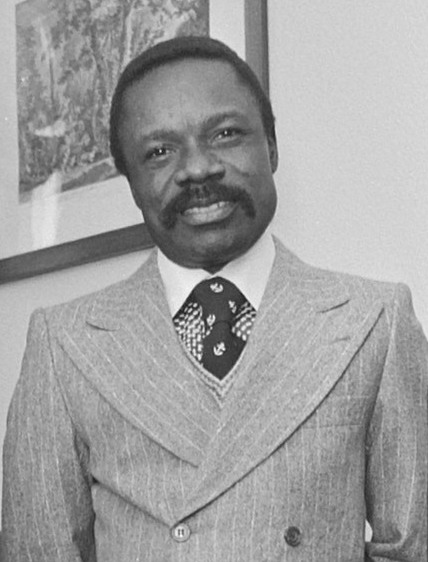
President of Gabon Omar Bongo

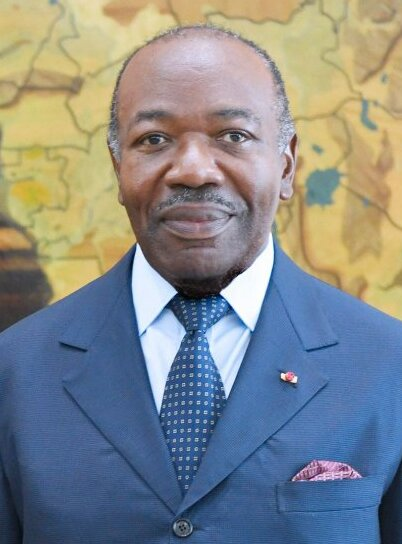
Gabon's Minister of National Defense Ali Bongo

The most prominent figures involved in the 2003 incident and its following negotiations

Since the 1970s, the neighboring nation of Gabon had laid claims to the island, along with its sister islands Conga and Cocoteros, and began administering them after taking control of them in the 1972 military operation. After the prospects of commercially viable oil reserves were revealed to exist around the archipelago in the 2000s, however, debate over the control of the islands restarted as both nations were also significant oil producers, and a proper exploration of the surrounding waters could not begin with the active dispute. In February 2003, Gabon's Minister of National Defense and the President's son Ali Bongo visited the island, asserting Gabon's claim to it while there. The declaration was immediately met with resentment by Equatorial Guinea, with Prime Minister Cándido Muatetema Rivas stating on a radio broadcast shortly afterward their "deep concerns" for Gabon's "illegal occupation".

The dispute became complicated after Gabon's claim over the islands was supported by France, as Gabon had formerly been their colony, and as such the French multinational oil producer TotalEnergies operated much of the oil output of the nation and would likely profit from Gabon's control of the island's oil reserves. Conversely in Equatorial Guinea, American multinational oil producers ExxonMobil, Hess, and Marathon Oil operated much of the oil output of the nation after helping them discover oil in 1995, and likewise were more keen on supporting Equatorial Guinea's claim. After the 2003 incident, proposals were made by both nations presidents: with President Bongo of Gabon suggesting Equatorial Guinea become their counterpart in a "joint exploitation" for oil in the territory, and President Teodoro Obiang of Equatorial Guinea stating he would consider conciliatory negotiations like the joint exploitation, but would not rule out his claim to the territory. With both nations at a stalemate after years of failing to make a diplomatic solution, both nations agreed to have Yves Fortier, a mediator from the United Nations (UN), settle the dispute on 19 January 2004. The decision to find a diplomatic solution was supported by the US in response to the growing influence of the oil trade organization OPEC in both Equatorial Guinea and Gabon, and likewise hosted the foreign ministers of both nations in New York where a communiqué agreement was signed.

This UN mediation led to the International Court of Justice (ICJ) agreeing to settle the dispute with the permission of both nations in 2016. The dispute was brought before a panel of fifteen judges in The Hague on 5 March 2021, where proceedings on the case began. Initial briefs were made by Equatorial Guinea on 5 October 2021 and Gabon on 5 May 2022. The main cases were presented by both nations in October 2024, with Equatorial Guinea led by Vice Minister of Mines and Hydrocarbons Domingo Mba Esono, and neighboring nations represented by teams of lawyers, government officials, diplomats, and cartographers. The main argument presented by Equatorial Guinea was the claim the Bata Convention's agreement was void as the original agreement could not be produced by Gabon and only photocopies remained, as well as being unsigned. Conversely, President of the Constitutional Court of Gabon Marie-Madeleine Mborantsuo previously claimed the Bata Convention "resolves all sovereignty issues regarding the islands and border delimitation". On 19 May 2025, the ICJ made their final ruling asserting Equatorial Guinea had control of the archipelago containing the island, according to the 1900 Treaty of Paris. The 1974 Bata Convention was referred to by ICJ jurist Julia Sebutinde as "not a treaty having the force of law". The ruling further stated Gabon was to remove the small military presence they had on the island.

== See also ==
- List of islands of Equatorial Guinea
- Bakassi § Territorial dispute – Another dispute over oil-rich land in the Gulf of Guinea, between Nigeria and Cameroon
