= Elobey, Annobón, and Corisco =

Colonial administration of Spanish Africa

Coordinates: 3.7524°N 8.7753°E

Elobey, Annobón, and Corisco Elobey, Annobón y Corisco (Spanish)
- 1843–1926
- Flag Coat of arms
- Anthem: Marcha Real (1844–1873, 1874–1926); Himno de Riego (1873–1874)
- Spanish protectorate and colony of Elobey, Annobón, and Corisco
- Status: Dependency of Spanish Guinea
- Capital: Santa Isabel
- Common languages: Spanish
- Monarch
  - 1844–1868: Isabella II (1st)
  - 1885–1926: Alfonso XIII
- History
  - Established: 1843
  - Disestablished: 1926

Area
  - Total: 36 km^{2} (14 sq mi)
- Currency: Spanish peseta
Preceded by	Succeeded by
Benga people	Spanish Guinea
- Today part of: Equatorial Guinea

Elobey, Annobón, and Corisco was a colonial administration of Spanish Africa consisting of the island of Annobón, located southwest of São Tomé and Príncipe in the Gulf of Guinea, and the small islands of Elobey Grande, Elobey Chico, and Corisco, located in the Corisco Bay near the mouth of the Mitémélé River in the Muni Estuary.

It was established as a protectorate in 1843. Its total area was under 36 km^{2}, and the estimated population in 1910 was 2,950 people. It depended on the governor-general based in Santa Isabel, who had lieutenant governors in Annobón and Elobey Chico.

All of Spain's colonial possessions in Guinea were administratively unified in 1926 to form Spanish Guinea, which later became independent in 1968 as Equatorial Guinea. Elobey Grande, Elobey Chico, and Corisco are now part of the Litoral Province within Río Muni on the mainland, while Annobón constitutes a province in its own right within the Insular Region.

== History ==
Annobón was discovered by the Portuguese on 1 January 1472 - hence the name, Ano Bom (lit. "Good Year"), from New Year's Day (Portuguese: Dia do Ano Bom).

The Spanish domination in the islands dates back to 1777. Annobón was ceded to Spain together with Fernando Po through the 1778 Treaty of El Pardo, in exchange for some territories to the south of Brazil. In 1959 Annobón was unified with the island and province of Fernando Poo, while Elobey and Corisco became part of the Spanish continental Guinea called Río Muni, to form the Spanish Guinea.

== Postage stamps ==
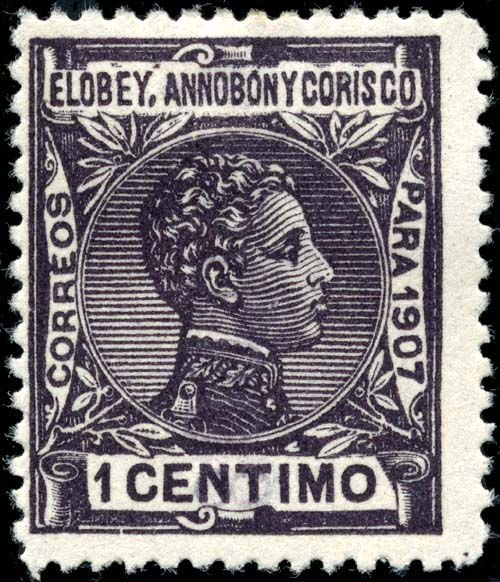
1 céntimo, 1907

The island is known by philatelists for having issued its own postage stamps between 1903 and 1910. The first issue depicted a profile of the young Alfonso XIII of Spain, and consisted of 18 values, from ¼ centimos to 10 pesetas.

In 1905, the values of 1c to 10 ptas were reprinted, although with the same date. The 1906 issue was made by means of ratings stamped on the previous series. The 1907 series consisted of 16 values between 1c and 10 ptas, updated to a profile of an older Alfonso. Several of these values were surcharged between 1908 and 1910.

A total of 72 issues are identified in the Yvert catalogue.

Subsequently, the island used the stamps of Spanish Guinea.

== Literature ==
The American author William Styron wrote a short vignette entitled Elobey, Annobón, and Corisco, about his time as a young Marine officer during World War II. His childhood memories of stamp collecting (including stamps from the Guinean islands) are a welcome distraction from the dread and fear he feels when he thinks of the approaching Battle of Okinawa. Although written in 1985, the vignette was not published until 2009, in the collection of Marine-related short stories The Suicide Run (Random House 2009).
