= Juan José Lerena y Barry =

Spanish diplomat

Juan José Lerena y Barry (1796–1863) was a Spanish naval captain who attempted to establish Spanish control over the Gulf of Guinea during the mid-nineteenth century.

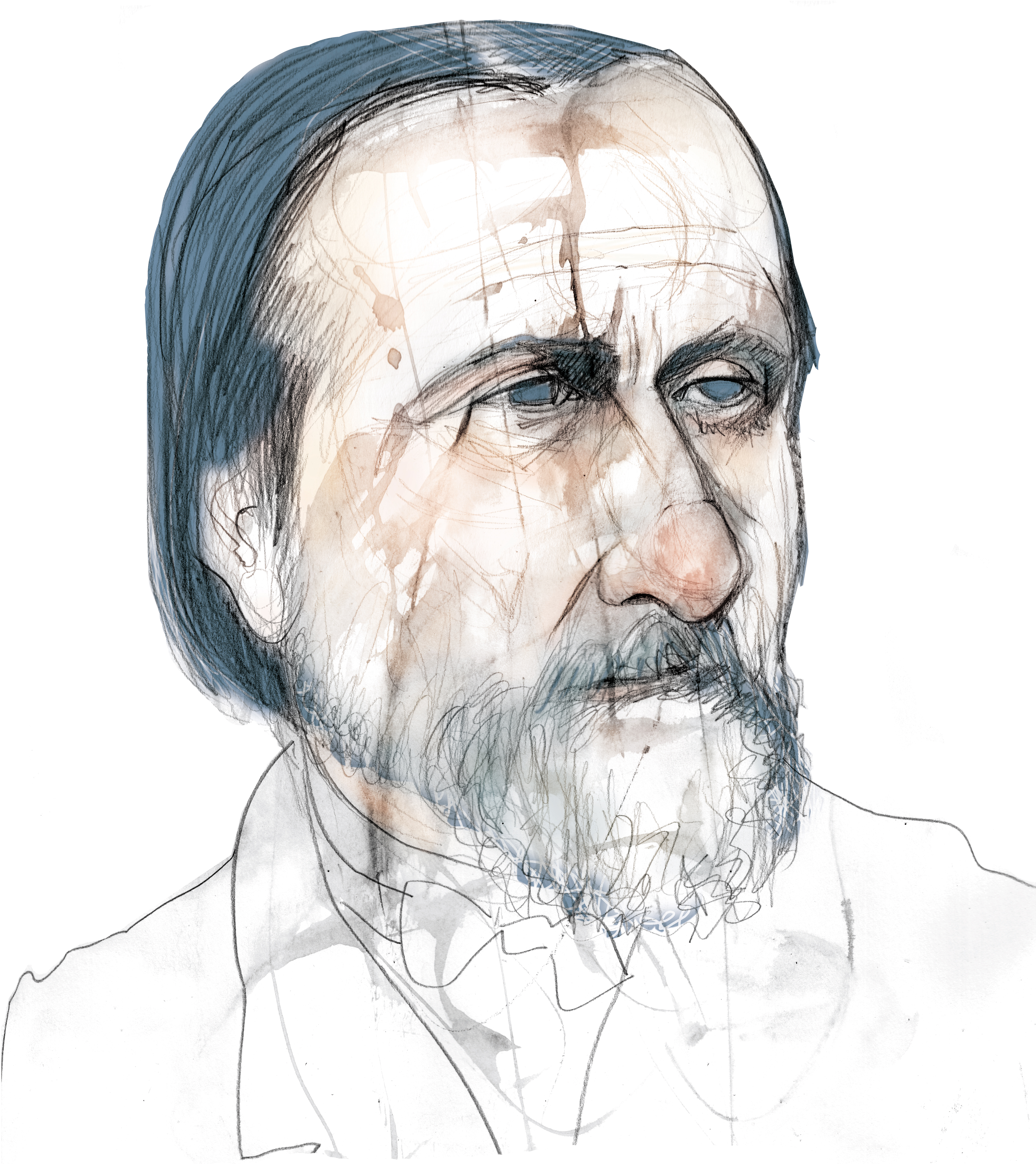
Juan José Lerena

== Biography ==
Born in Cádiz, he served as commander of the brigantine Nervión and royal commissary for the island of Fernando Po. In 1843, he was sent to proclaim Spanish sovereignty over Fernando Po, and replaced English toponyms with Spanish ones. He worked to establish Spanish control over other islands in the Gulf of Guinea, annexing Corisco after negotiating with Benga king Bonkoro I, and colonizing the foothold on the African continent that later became Spanish Guinea. He also took possession of Elobey Grande and Elobey Chico and the island of Annobón.

After a voyage filled with hardships, he returned to Spain and gave his report to his government. The Spanish government subsequently prepared a second, larger expedition to the Gulf of Guinea. Lerena was meant to head this expedition; however, he was frustrated in this ambition.

He also invented a solar telegraph whose use he offered to the Spanish Navy.

He died at Madrid in 1863.
