= Province of Fernando Poo =

Former province of Spain (1959–1968)

Coordinates: 3°33′N 8°42′E

Fernando Poo
- Province (1959–1968)
- Coat of arms

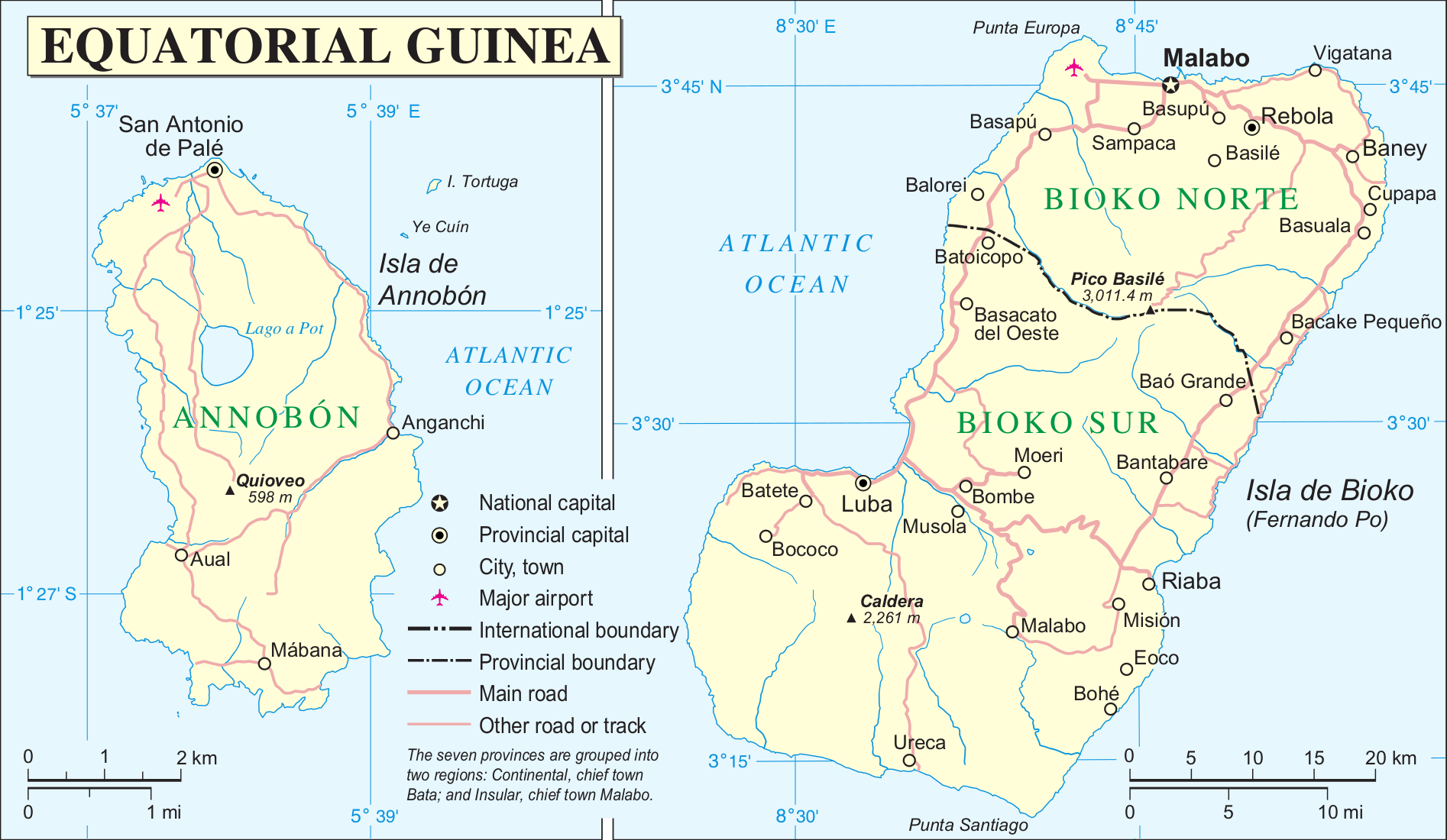
- Map of Annobón and Bioko
- Country: Spain
- Autonomous Region: Spanish Guinea
- Capital: Santa Isabel de Fernando Poo

Government
  - Body: Provincial Deputation of Fernando Poo

Area
  - Total: 2,034 km^{2} (785 sq mi)

The Province of Fernando Poo was a Spanish province in Africa between 1959 and 1968. It consisted of the islands of Fernando Poo and Annobón, the insular region of Spanish Guinea (modern-day Equatorial Guinea). Its administrative capital was Santa Isabel de Fernando Poo. It had an area of 2 034 km².

== History ==
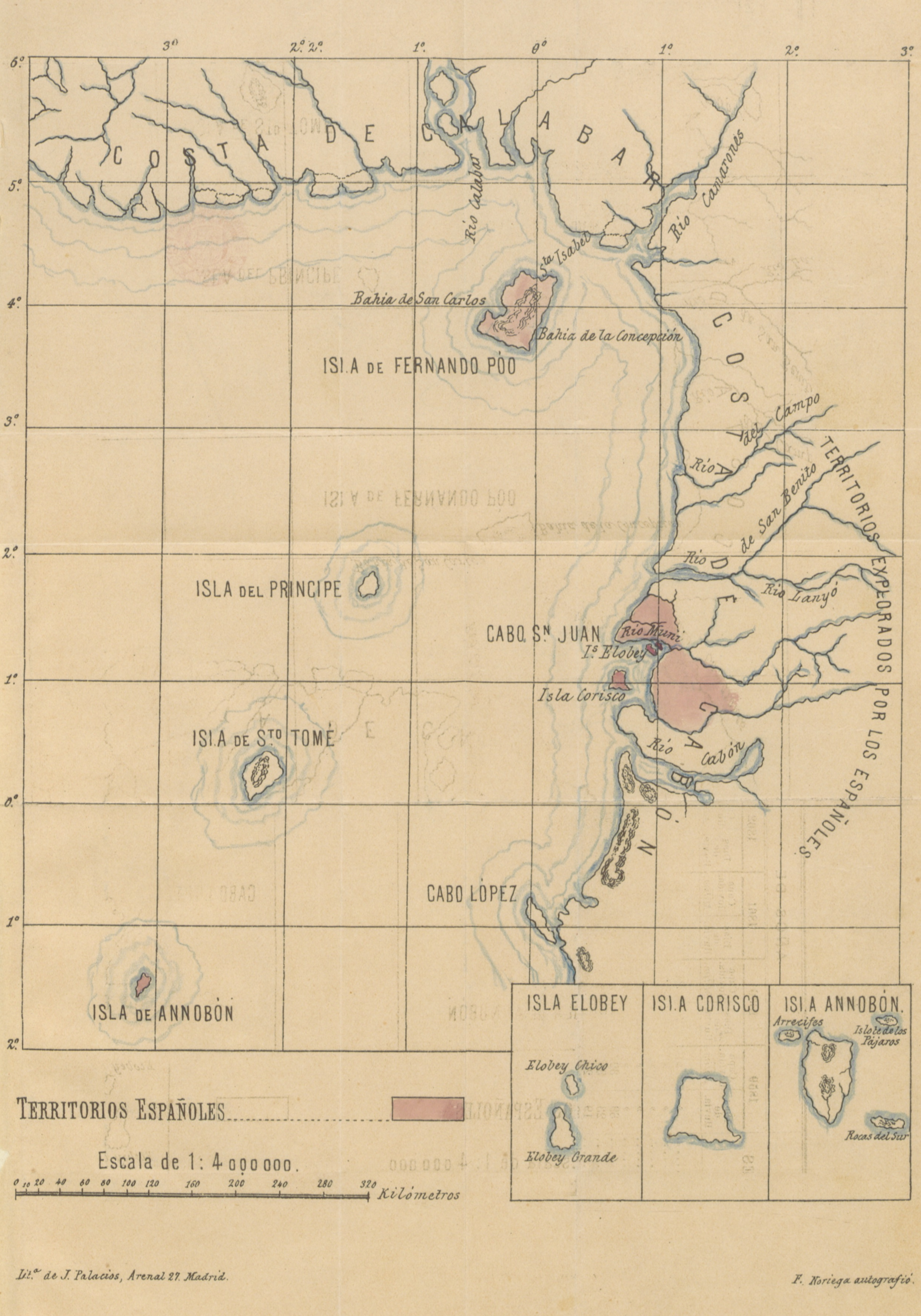
Map of Spanish possessions in the Gulf of Guinea in 1897, before the Treaty of Paris in 1900.

The territory of the province was ceded by Portugal to Spain in 1778, by the First Treaty of San Ildefonso (1777).

It formed a province together with Río Muni from 1956 to 1959 as the Spanish Province of the Gulf of Guinea. In 1959, it became the Province of Fernando Poo within the autonomous region of Equatorial Guinea, a name it kept until its independence from Spain in 1968.

On 1 September 1960 the Provincial Deputation of Fernando Poo was established in the city of Santa Isabel de Fernando Poo, whose first president was Alzina de Bochi.

The province vehicle registration prefix was "FP", established by an Order on 20 June 1961, which was annulled by an Order on 17 March 1969. Previously the prefix was "TEG" (Territorios Españoles del Golfo de Guinea), established by the order of 30 September 1929, territories that were divided into two provinces by the Law of 29 July 1959.

== See also ==
- History of Equatorial Guinea
- Elobey, Annobón, and Corisco
