= Treaty of Paris (1900) =

1900 treaty between Spain and France

- 27 June 1900
- Type: Bilateral treaty
- Signed: 27 June 1900
- Location: Paris, France
- Original signatories: France; Spain
- Ratifiers: France; Spain

The Treaty of Paris, published in the Spanish Gaceta on 30 March 1901 under the title Convention between Spain and France for the delimitation of the possessions of both countries on the coast of the Sahara and on that of the Gulf of Guinea, was signed on 27 June 1900 between representatives of the Kingdom of Spain (under the government of the regent Queen Maria Christina of Austria) and the French Third Republic (presided over by Émile Loubet).

The Treaty delimited the borders of the Spanish colonies in the Sahara desert (Río de Oro, part of Spanish Sahara) and Equatorial Africa (Spanish Guinea) with respect to the adjoining French colonies on Africa.

Fernando León y Castillo, the then Spanish ambassador to France, and Theophile Delcasse, French deputy and Minister of Foreign Affairs, acted as representatives of their respective governments for the purposes of the Treaty.

Based on the terms of the Treaty, Río Muni was relieved of all conflicting claims. Spain was left with the mainland enclave of Río Muni, a mere 26,000 km^{2} out of the 300,000 stretching east to the Ubangi River which they had initially claimed, but those claims would have also conflicted with German claims in Kamerun. Moreover, the treaty granted the French the right to pre-emptively seize all territories if Spain decided to abandon its possessions in Río Muni.

== Background ==
=== Río de Oro (Spanish Sahara) ===
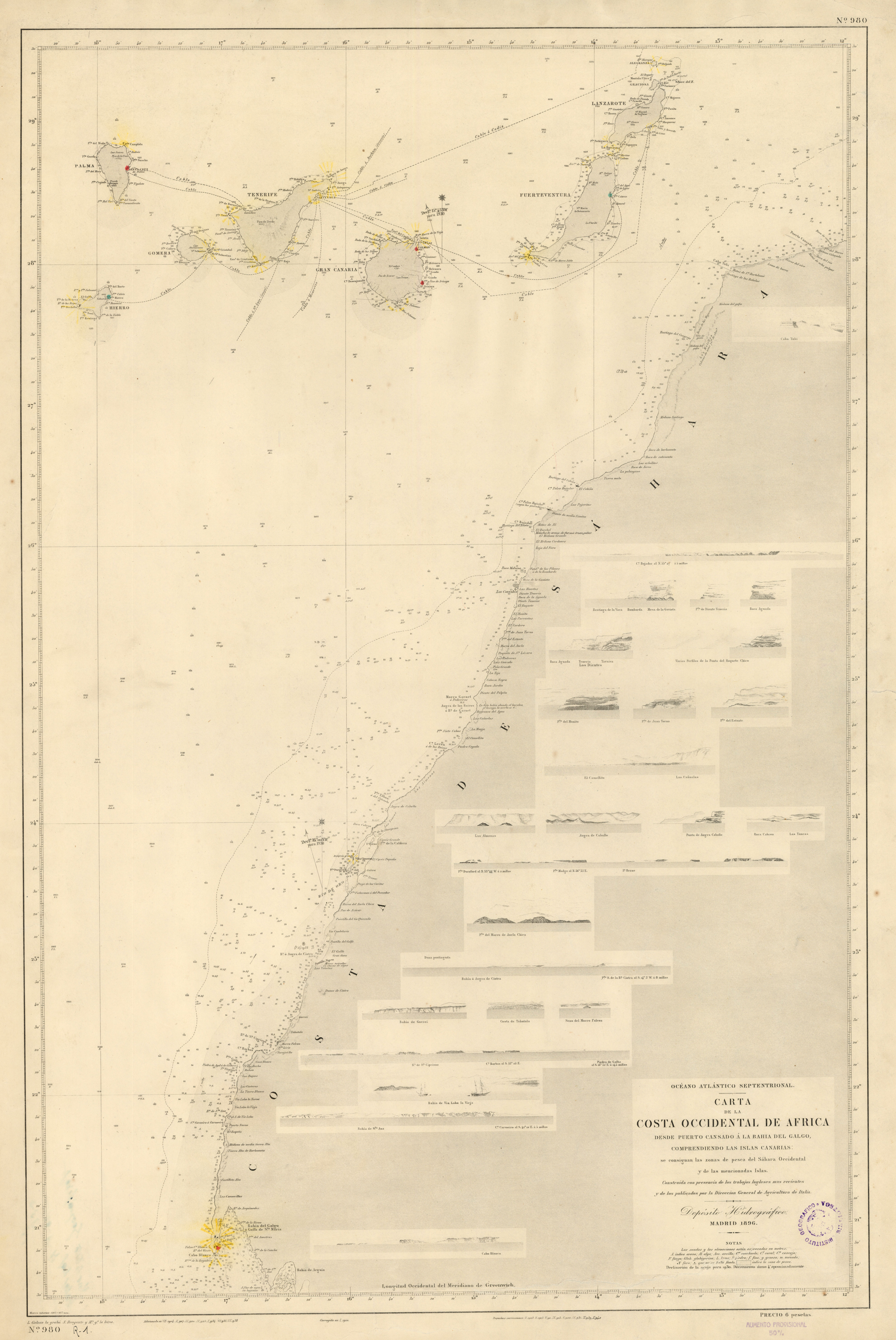
Map detailing the coast of what was then Río de Oro (part of the colony of Spanish Sahara) in 1896.

1900 borders resulting from this treaty for the Spanish territories of Spanish West Africa until 1956, including Río de Oro within Spanish Sahara.

Spanish interest in Western Sahara arose from fishing activities carried out from the nearby Canary Islands. In 1881 a pontoon was anchored off the coast of the Río de Oro Peninsula to support the tasks of the Canarian fishing fleet.

However, it was not until 1884 that Villa Cisneros was founded. That year, in an operation promoted by the Spanish Society of Africanists and financed by the government of Antonio Cánovas del Castillo, the Spanish soldier and Arabist Emilio Bonelli surveyed the coast between Cape Bojador and Cape Blanc, founding three establishments on the Saharan coast: one at Villa Cisneros, in honor of Cardinal Cisneros; another at Cape Blanc, which he named Medina Gatell; and another at Angra de Cintra, named Puerto Badía (in honor of the Arabist and adventurer Domingo Badía).

With the start of the Spanish presence in the Sahara zone, the Spanish colony known as Spanish Sahara (1884–1976) was created, with two subdivisions: the north would be called Saguia el-Hamra and the south, Río de Oro.

Bonelli secured an agreement signed by the native inhabitants of the Río de Oro peninsula whereby they placed themselves under Spain's protection. Thanks to the presence of the three posts, in December of that year the Spanish government notified the powers assembled at the Berlin Conference (1884–1885) that it was taking possession of the territory between Cape Bojador and Cape Blanc. However, both Medina Gatell and Puerto Badía were abandoned shortly afterwards, leaving only Villa Cisneros as a permanent settlement.

For a long time, Villa Cisneros constituted Spain's only presence in Saharan territory. It was not until the second decade of the 20th century that the Spanish presence expanded. Later, until 1958 it would be known as Spanish West Africa and until 1975 as the Sahara province.

=== Río Muni (Spanish Guinea) ===
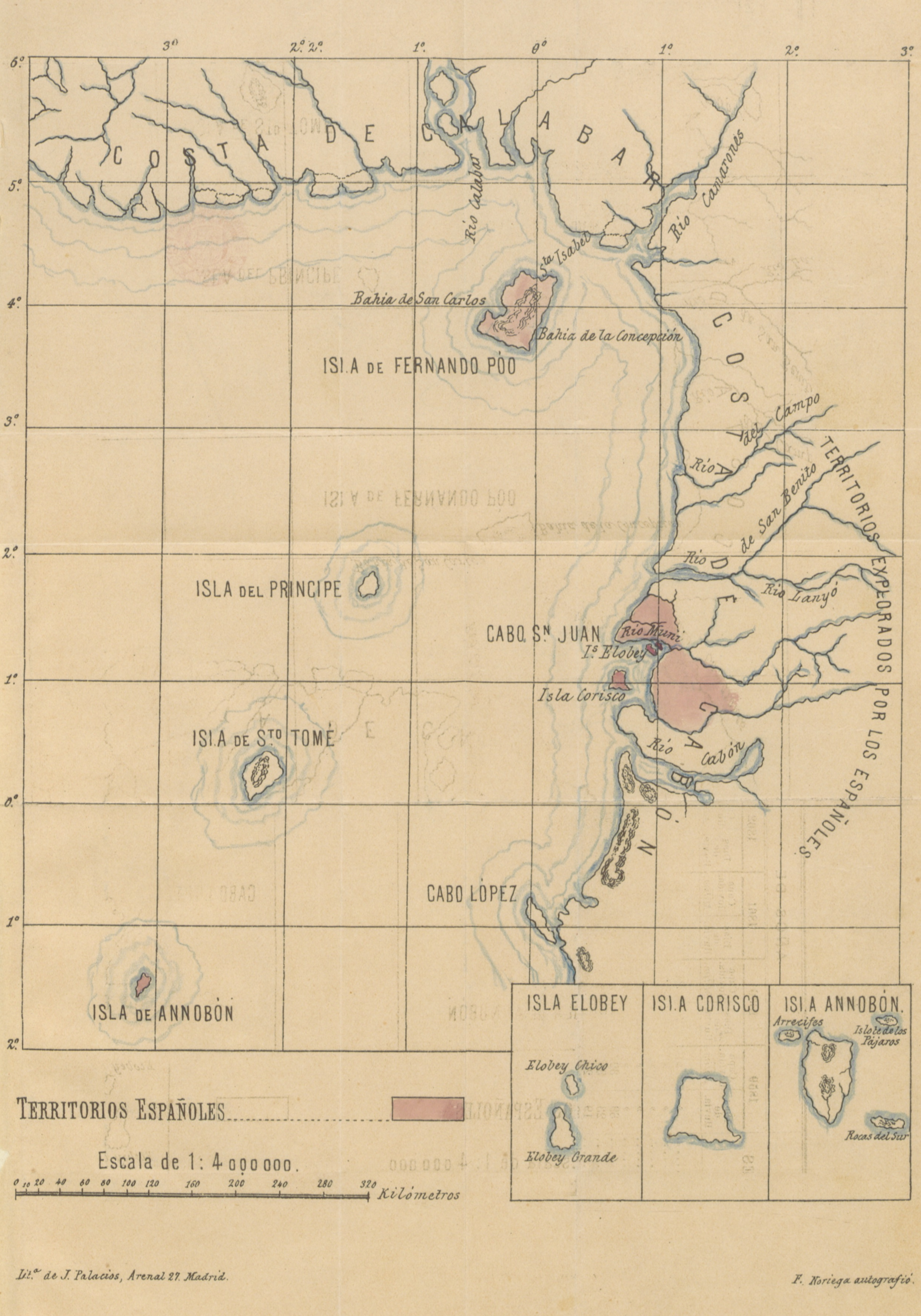
Map of Spanish possessions in the Gulf of Guinea in 1897, before the signing of this treaty.

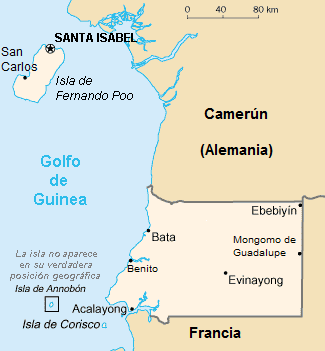
1900 borders resulting from this treaty for what would become Spanish Guinea (today Equatorial Guinea).

The Portuguese explorer Fernando Po is considered the first European to set foot on the island of Bioko in 1472 and, although he called it Formosa, it ended up being known by his name. Portugal maintained control until 1777, when the islands and commercial rights were ceded to Spain by the Treaty of San Ildefonso of 1777, and by the Treaty of El Pardo of 1778 between Queen Maria I of Portugal and King Charles III of Spain. Spain intended to begin slave-trading operations on the continent. Between 1778 and 1810, the territory of Equatorial Guinea was administered by the Viceroyalty of the Río de la Plata, based in Buenos Aires, through the Governorate of Fernando Po and Annobon.

From 1827 to 1843, the United Kingdom had a base on Bioko to suppress the transatlantic slave trade, which was later moved to Sierra Leone following an agreement with Spain in 1843. In 1843, with the restoration of Spanish sovereignty after the arrival of Juan José Lerena, it became known as the "Spanish Territories of the Gulf of Guinea". Although there were isolated expeditions such as that of Manuel Iradier, the Spanish government had not permanently occupied the large area in the Bight of Biafra to which it had treaty rights, and the French had been expanding their occupation at the expense of the area claimed by Spain. From 1885, towns on the mainland Equatoguinean coast around Cape San Juan and the mouth of the Muni River signed treaties with Spanish explorers and came under the protectorate of the Spanish government.

== Terms of the treaty ==
Evolution of Spanish possessions and claims in the Gulf of Guinea (1778–1968).

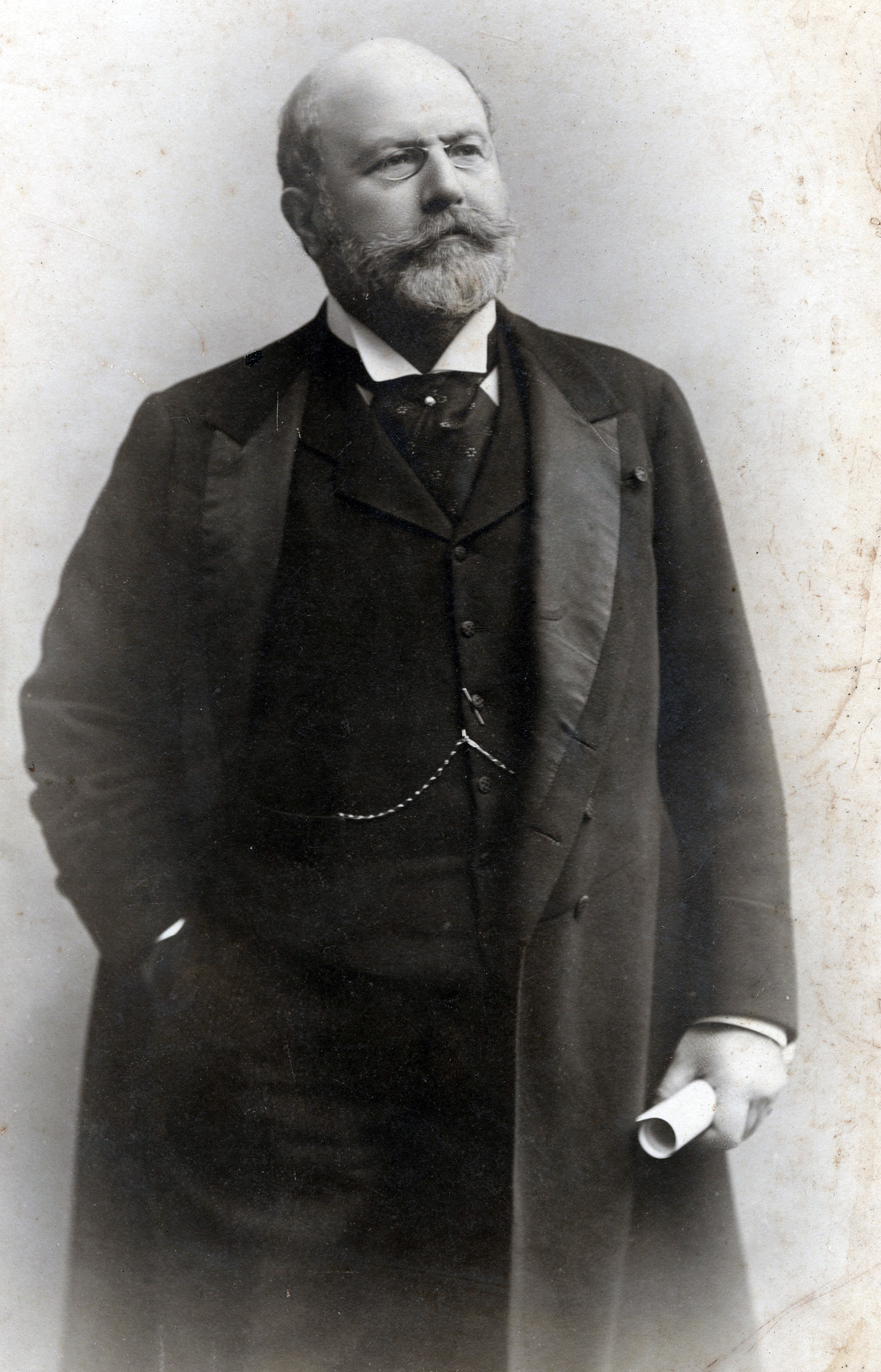
Fernando León y Castillo, the Spanish negotiator in this treaty.

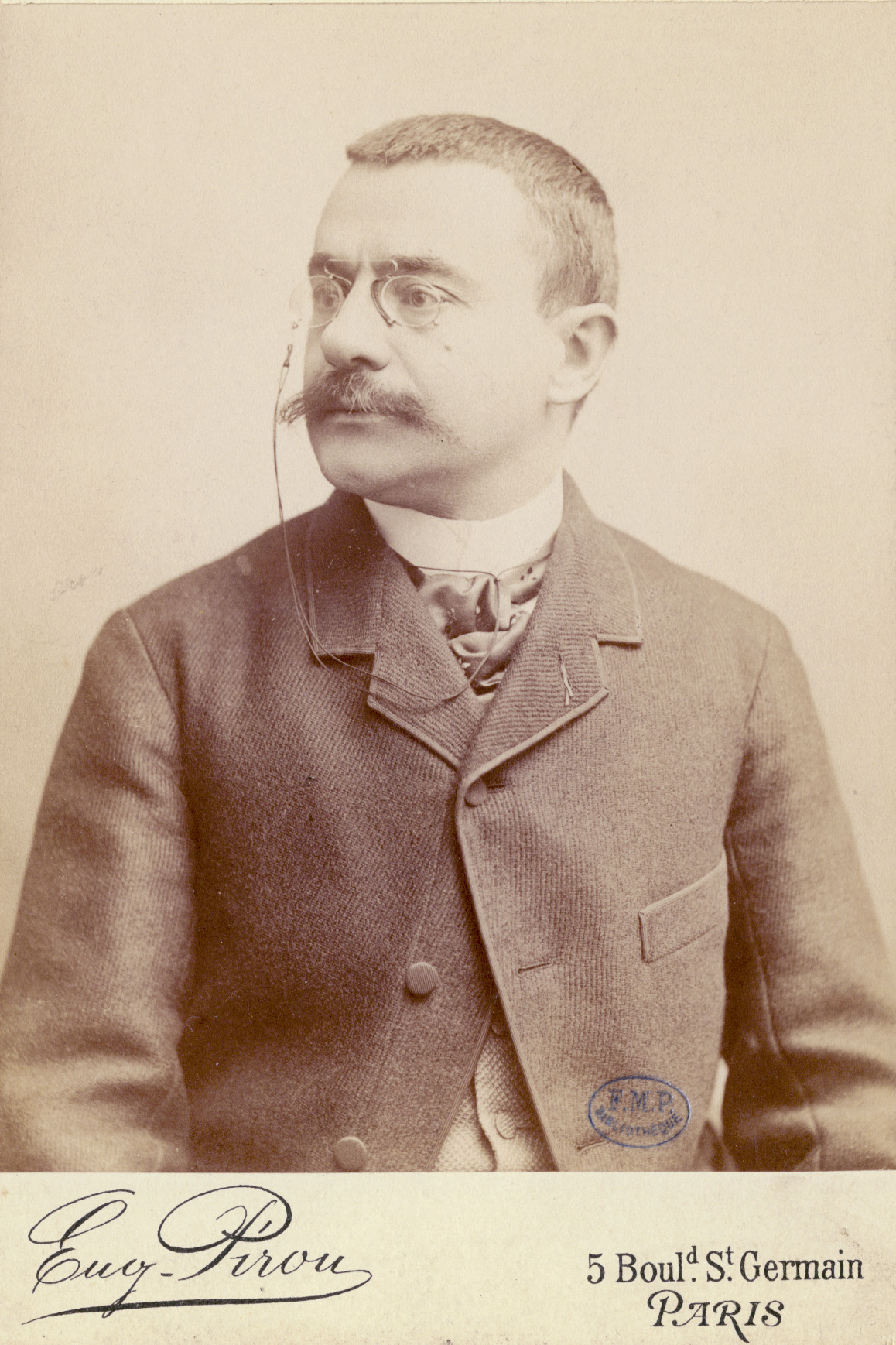
Theophile Delcasse, the French negotiator in this treaty.

Map of Muni: Spanish Continental Guinea, 1903.

1914 map showing the Scramble for Africa, carried out by European colonial powers, accelerated after the Berlin Conference of 1885. On this map Río Muni is shown as completely surrounded by the German colony of Kamerun because the French ceded part of their colony of French Equatorial Africa in 1911 as a solution to the Agadir Crisis, creating what was called Neukamerun.

The negotiations were not especially harsh, and an agreement was reached a few months after they began. This occurred because the two countries were in different situations: France was establishing the French colonial empire mainly in Africa, expanding in multiple areas and rearming after the defeat of 1871 against the German Empire in case a new war broke out (which ultimately happened in 1914). By contrast, Spain had just been defeated in 1898 by the United States, ended up selling to the Germans some remaining possessions in 1899 (both events marking the end of the Spanish Empire in the Americas and the Pacific), and had scarcely any resources to attempt new colonial ventures in Africa, a scramble in which it arrived late compared to other European colonial powers.

In 1891 a convention was signed between France and Spain in the disputed zones to maintain the status quo, which the French constantly violated during the 1890s because Spain had very little presence there (being focused on its problems in Cuba and the Philippines), while the French presence kept increasing and expanding. When talks between the two countries resumed at the beginning of 1900, Spain's position had weakened even further and France's had strengthened relative to the previous decade.

The French negotiator was Theophile Delcasse and the Spanish negotiator, Fernando León y Castillo. Delcasse and his advisers knew that Spain's position was very vulnerable. Negotiations over the limits of Río de Oro (southern Spanish Sahara) with respect to neighboring French colonies posed no problems, since France recognized to Spain a broad sector of the coast. Even so, due to Spanish errors committed in prior years through neglect and forgetfulness, the French acquired Iyil, Bay of the Greyhound and Adrar T'mar (today part of Mauritania). The southern limit of Spanish Sahara would be the parallel 21°20'. The eastern limit was defined in Article 1 of the convention.

The case of Guinea was different: there, territorial negotiations were more difficult. On 18 May 1900 a provisional agreement was drafted whereby the Spanish mainland part of the Gulf of Guinea would cover the coasts between the south of the mouth of the Campo River and the northern mouths of the Muni and Utamboni rivers and would extend inland eastward to the limit of the meridian 11°20' (meridian 9° East of Paris). Article 4 of the convention fixed the agreed limits. In addition, France renounced any compensation for the lighthouses and the military and civil installations it possessed in the zones that would come under Spanish rule, a point that pleased the Spanish government greatly given the economic hardship it faced at the time. A right of preference was reserved to France to occupy Spanish territories if Spain decided to abandon its possessions in the Sahara or Guinea.

The treaty was ultimately signed at the Quai d'Orsay (Paris) on 27 June 1900. The treaty had 10 articles, 3 annexes, and a final declaration. In general, the Spanish government welcomed the agreement with satisfaction, and the same was true of the public, which was tired of colonial adventures and diplomatic failures. Spanish newspapers of the time did not cover the matter much. In Spanish colonialist circles the treaty was received with differing opinions.

For France, this treaty, together with other diplomatic agreements and conquests, had made that country the "master" of almost all of West Africa and with an important presence in Central Africa. Part of the French government and French colonialist circles considered that too much had been given to Spain given the disparity of forces between the two countries. They argued outright that Spain should not be given any mainland Guinean territory, or at most should be confined to the surroundings of Cape San Juan. France did not mind a "weak" Spain occupying territories in Africa if that prevented them from being occupied by the British Empire or the German Empire, the true rivals of the French empire. In addition, France expected a hypothetical partition of Morocco—which did occur a few years later—and did not want an added adversary in Spain given that other countries—Germany, the United Kingdom, and Italy—were not initially expected to favor French demands.

Theophile Delcasse was decorated by the Spanish government with the Order of Charles III on 9 July 1900.

In 1901 the Spanish government sent a mission to mainland Guinea to map the territory and determine the exact boundaries with neighboring French colonies. The presidency of that commission was entrusted to Pedro Jover y Tovar, who considered it a humiliation that so little territory had been obtained and, amid a depression triggered by diagnosed neurasthenia, feeling unwell for having cooperated in this agreement, he committed suicide on the return voyage to Spain on 21 October 1901.

During the 19th century Spanish colonization was precarious and operated under an interim regime. After the signing of this agreement Spanish colonization changed: its driving force would no longer be the government but rather private initiative.

Finally, the Royal Decree of 12 July 1904 established:

Article 1. The islands of Fernando Poo, Annobon, Corisco (island), Great Elobey and Little Elobey and the continental territory of Guinea, whose sovereignty was recognized to Spain by the Treaty with France of 27 June 1900, shall constitute, for the purposes of their government and administration, a single legal entity, officially denominated "Spanish Territories of the Gulf of Guinea", and divided into four districts, namely: Fernando Poo, Bata, Elobey, and Annobon.

== Bibliography ==
- Vilar, Juan Bautista (1971). El convenio franco-español de 1900 en los orígenes de la República de Guinea Ecuatorial [The Franco-Spanish convention of 1900 in the origins of the Republic of Equatorial Guinea] (in Spanish). Barcelona: Ariel. ISSN 0463-9863.
- Fegley, Randall (1989). "The Plunge into the Dark". In Peter Lang (ed.). Equatorial Guinea: An African Tragedy. New York: American University Studies. p. 19. ISBN 0820409774.

== Gallery ==
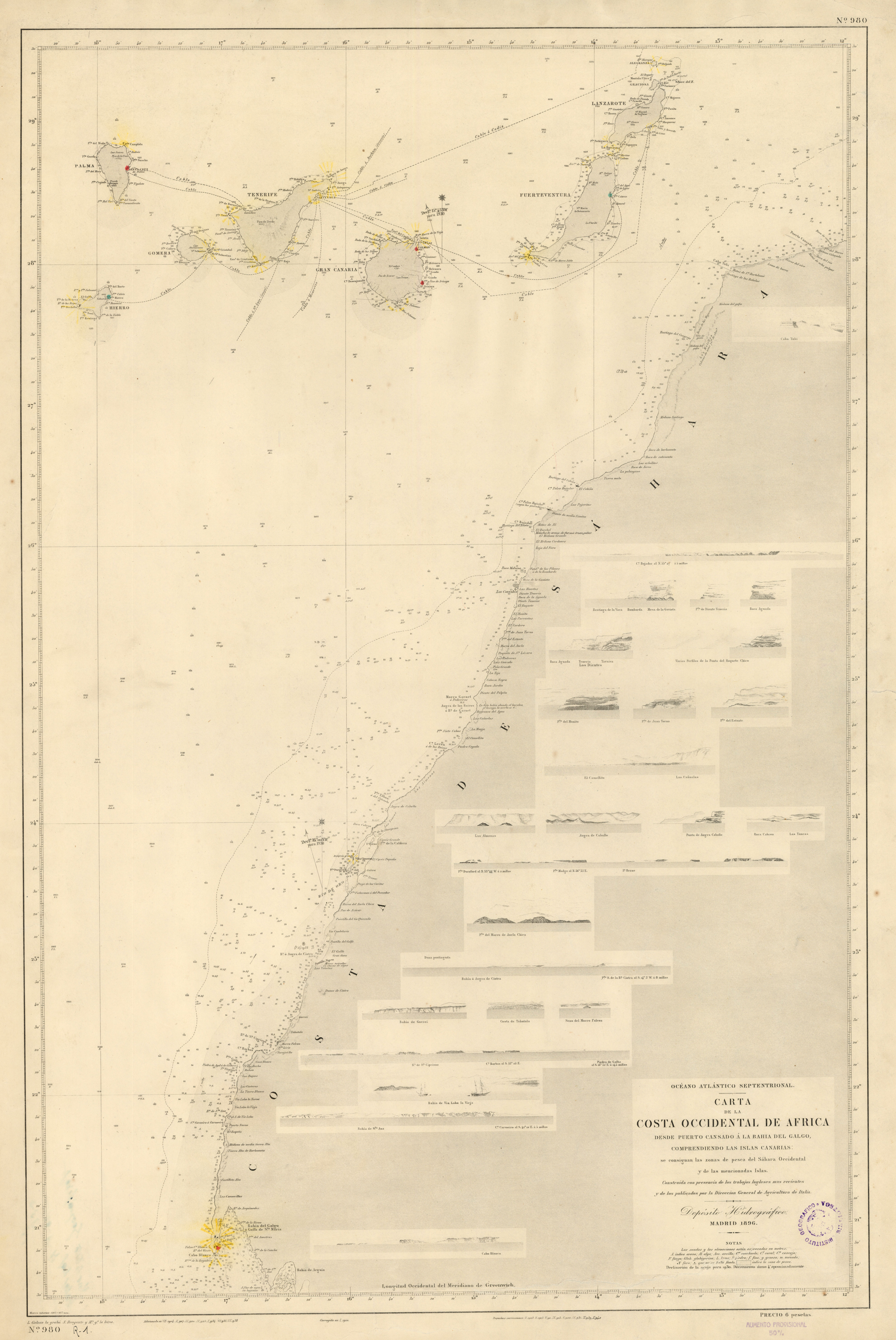
Map detailing the coast of Río de Oro (part of Spanish Sahara colony) in 1896.

Borders raised by this treaty after 1900 of the Spanish territories of Spanish West Africa until 1956, including Río de Oro within Spanish Sahara.

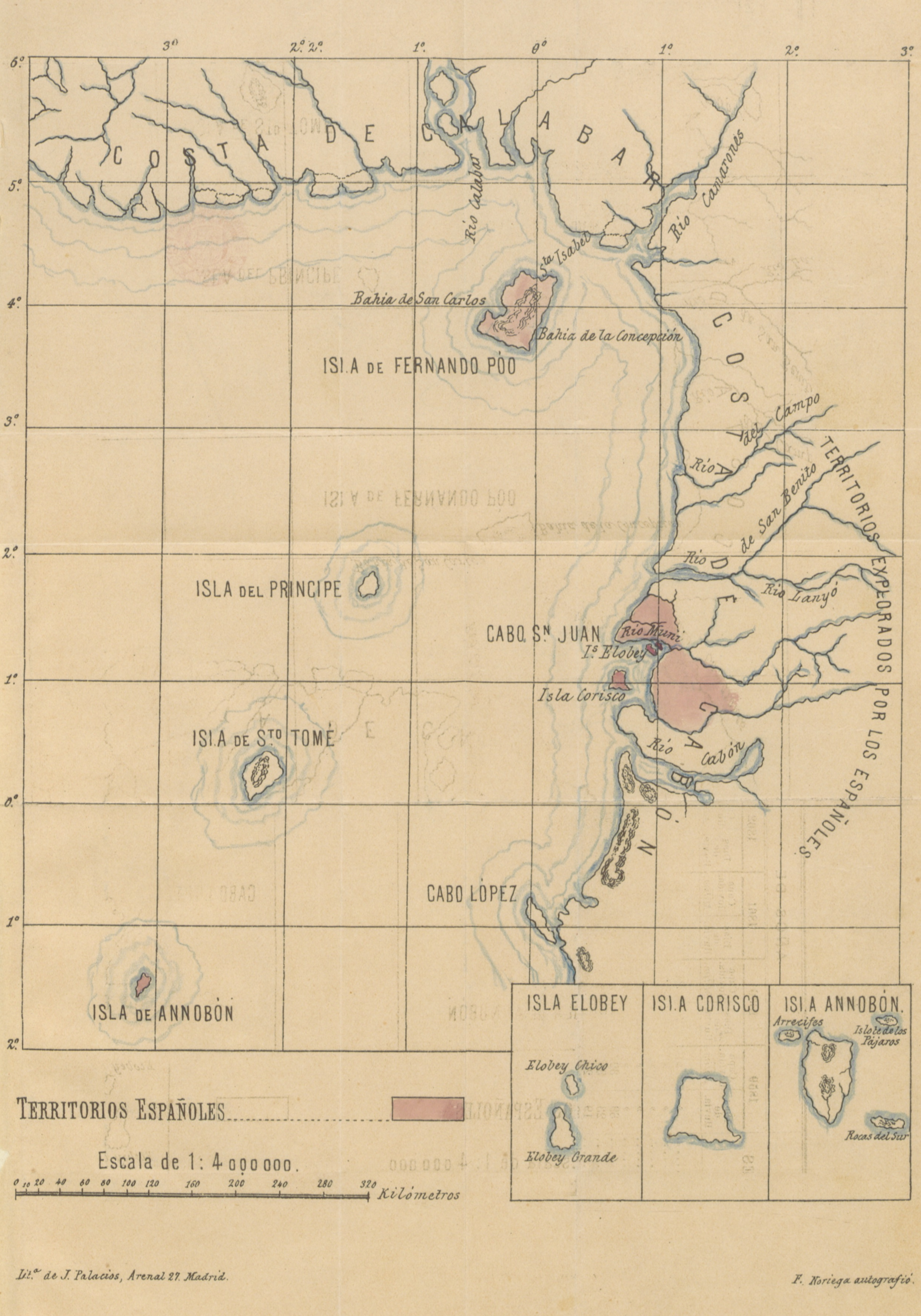
Map of Spanish possessions in the Gulf of Guinea in 1897, before the Treaty of Paris (1900).

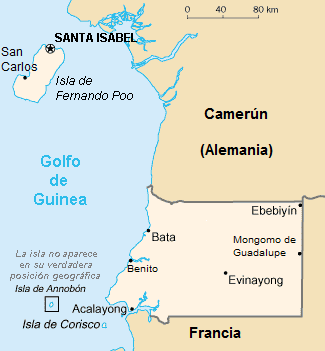
Borders after the agreement of 1900 on the land that would become Spanish Guinea (now Equatorial Guinea).

== See also ==
- Río Muni
- Equatorial Guinea
- History of Equatorial Guinea
- Spanish Empire
- Spanish Africa
