= Benga language =

Bantu language

Benga
- bɛŋga
- Native to: Equatorial Guinea, Gabon
- Ethnicity: Benga people
- Native speakers: 5,400 (2004–2011)
- Language family: Niger–Congo?: Atlantic–Congo; Benue–Congo; Bantoid; Bantu (Zone A); Sawabantu (A.30); Benga

Language codes
- ISO 639-3: bng
- Glottolog: beng1282
- Guthrie code: A.34
- ELP: Benga

Benga is a Bantu language spoken by the Benga people of Equatorial Guinea and Gabon. It has a dialectal variation called Bapuku. Benga speakers inhabit a small coastal portion of Río Muni, the Cape of San Juan, suburban enclaves of Rio Benito and Bata, the islands of Corisco, Small Elobey and Great Elobey.

== See also ==
- Bube language

== Texts ==
- Malěndwě ma holi ma panga ya vyo: Na Benga ... American Bible society. 1898.
- Westminster assembly of divine (1858). The Shorter Catechism, in the Benga Language.
- American Bible Society (1893). Panga ea kya, ekulu ya bebale...: The New Testament in the Benga language... American Bible Society.
- The gospel according to Matthew: translated into the Benga language. American Bible Society. 1881.
