= Benga (surname) =

Benga is a surname. Notable people with the surname include:

- Alexandru Benga (born 1989), Romanian footballer
- Gheorghe Benga (born 1944), Romanian physician and molecular biologist
- Ota Benga, pygmy best known for his time at the Bronx Zoo
- Sokhna Benga (born 1967), Senegalese writer and poet
