= Insular Region (Equatorial Guinea) =

Region of Equatorial Guinea

Coordinates: 3.5000°N 8.7000°E

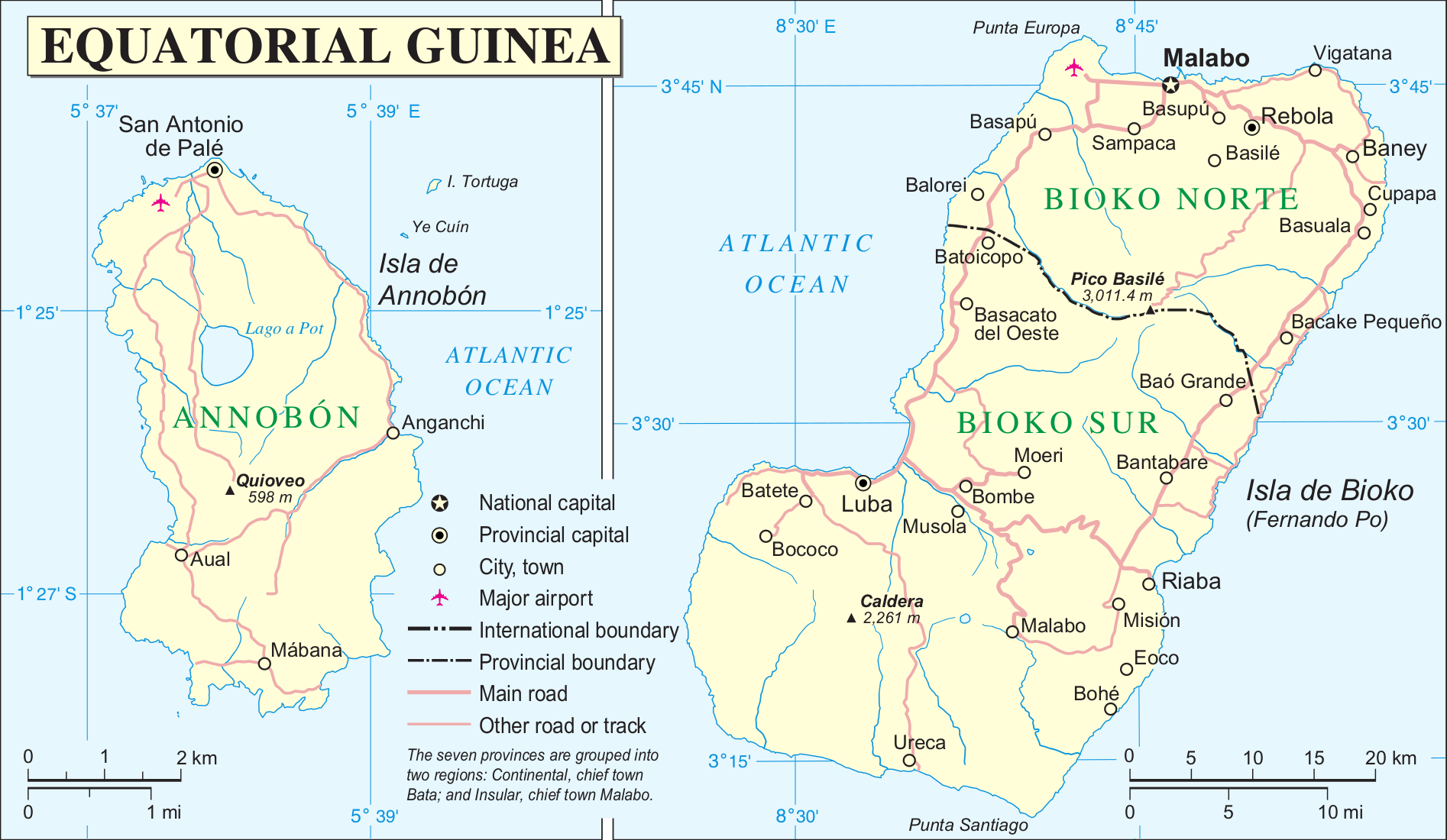
Maps of Annobón and Bioko.

The Insular Region of Equatorial Guinea (Spanish: Región Insular de Guinea Ecuatorial, French: Région insulaire de Guinée équatoriale, Portuguese: Região Insular da Guiné Equatorial) comprises the former Spanish territory of Fernando Po, together with Annobón island, the latter formerly part of the Spanish territory of Elobey, Annobón, and Corisco, which was located in the Gulf of Guinea and in the Corisco Bay.

The region covers 2,052 km^{2} and has a population of 340,362 in 2015. It is split into three political jurisdictions:

- Annobón
- Bioko Norte
- Bioko Sur

The islands located in Corisco Bay are not part of the Insular Region but are included in the Litoral Province which is part of the Continental Region (Litoral Province).

The largest city, Malabo, was the national capital until January 2026. It is now the regional administrative capital. The other main cities are Luba, Riaba, Rebola, Baney, and San Antonio de Palé.

Bioko was known as "Fernando Po" until the 1970s. It is located about 40 km away from Cameroon and is the largest island of the Gulf of Guinea, covering 2,017 km^{2}.

Annobón is a small 17 km^{2} volcanic island, and the most remote territory of the Republic of Equatorial Guinea. It is located 670 km away from Malabo, and 580 km away from Bata, just south of the equator. The sovereign state of São Tomé and Príncipe, is located between Annobón and Bioko.
