= Bobowasi Island =

Island in Ghana

- Interactive map of Bobowasi Island

Geography
- Location: Coast of Ghana
- Coordinates: 04°52′N 02°15′W

Administration
- Ghana
- Region: Western Region

Demographics
- Population: None

Bobowasi Island is an island in Ghana in the Axim Bay of the Atlantic Ocean. It is located 1.8 kilometres (1.1 mi) from the town of Axim and Axim Castle, north of Watts Rock, east of Egwang Rock, and south of Mensell Hedwig Rock, at the geographic coordinates 04°52′N 02°15′W. There is a lighthouse on the island. Administratively, it is part of the Western Region of Ghana, 238 km (148 mi) west of the capital, Accra.
