= Benga people =

Bantu ethnic group of Gabon and Equatorial Guinea

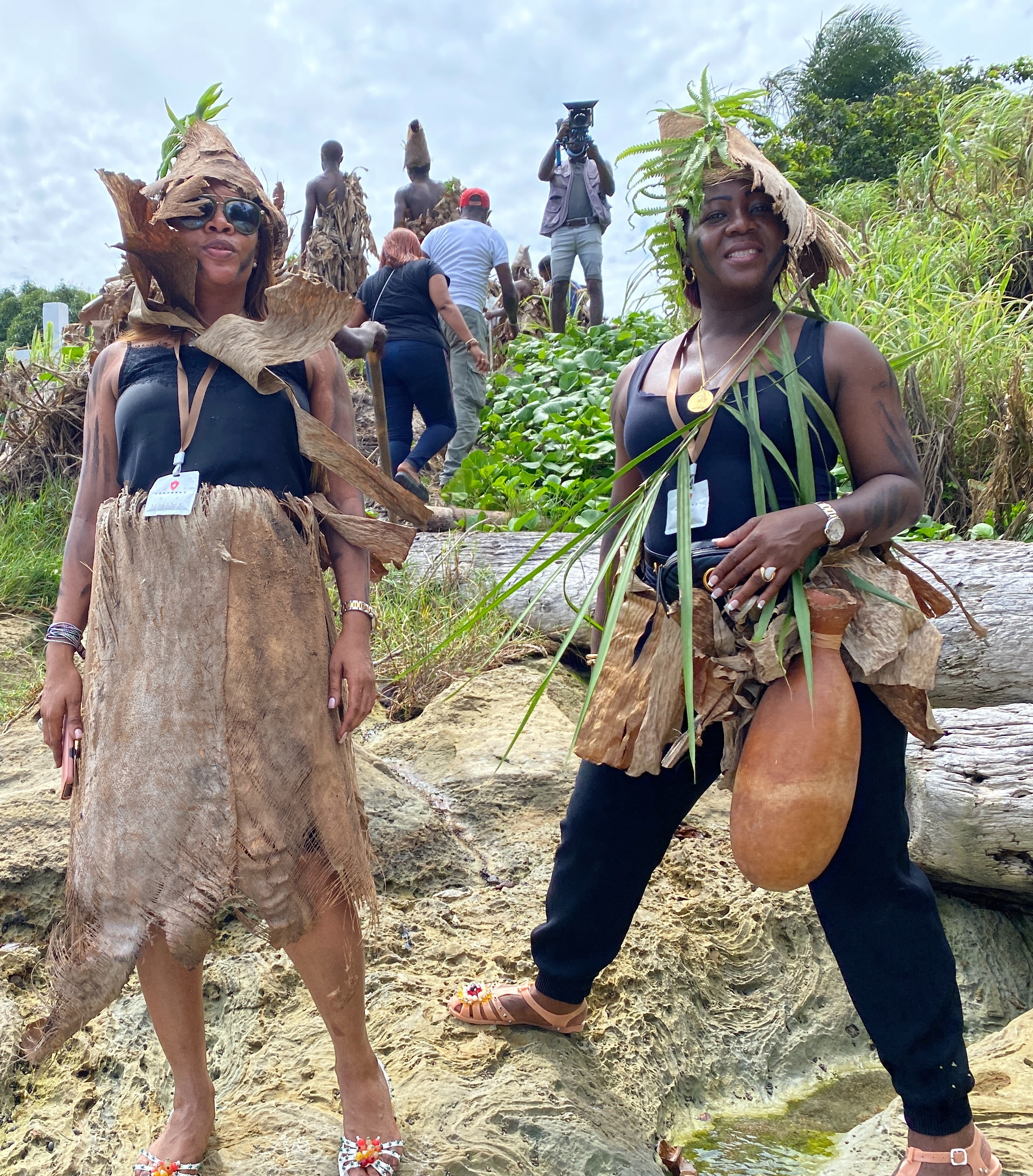
- Benga women during the traditional festival Djombe in Corisco Island.

Total population
- 8,200 (Equatorial Guinea: 6,800; Gabon: 1,800)

Languages
- Spanish, French, Benga language

Religion
- Christianity ~90% (Predominantly Roman Catholicism and Protestantism.), Traditional Religion (unspecified) ~10%.

Related ethnic groups
- Mpongwe,Combe,Balangue,Fang.

The Benga people are an African ethnic group, members of the Bantu peoples, who are indigenous to Equatorial Guinea and Gabon. Their indigenous language is Benga. They are referred to as Ndowe or Playeros (Beach People), one of several peoples on the Río Muni coast. Bengas inhabit a small coastal portion of the Cabo de San Juan, suburban enclaves in the coastal municipalities of Mbini and Bata, and the islands of Corisco, Elobey Grande and Elobey Chico.

== History ==
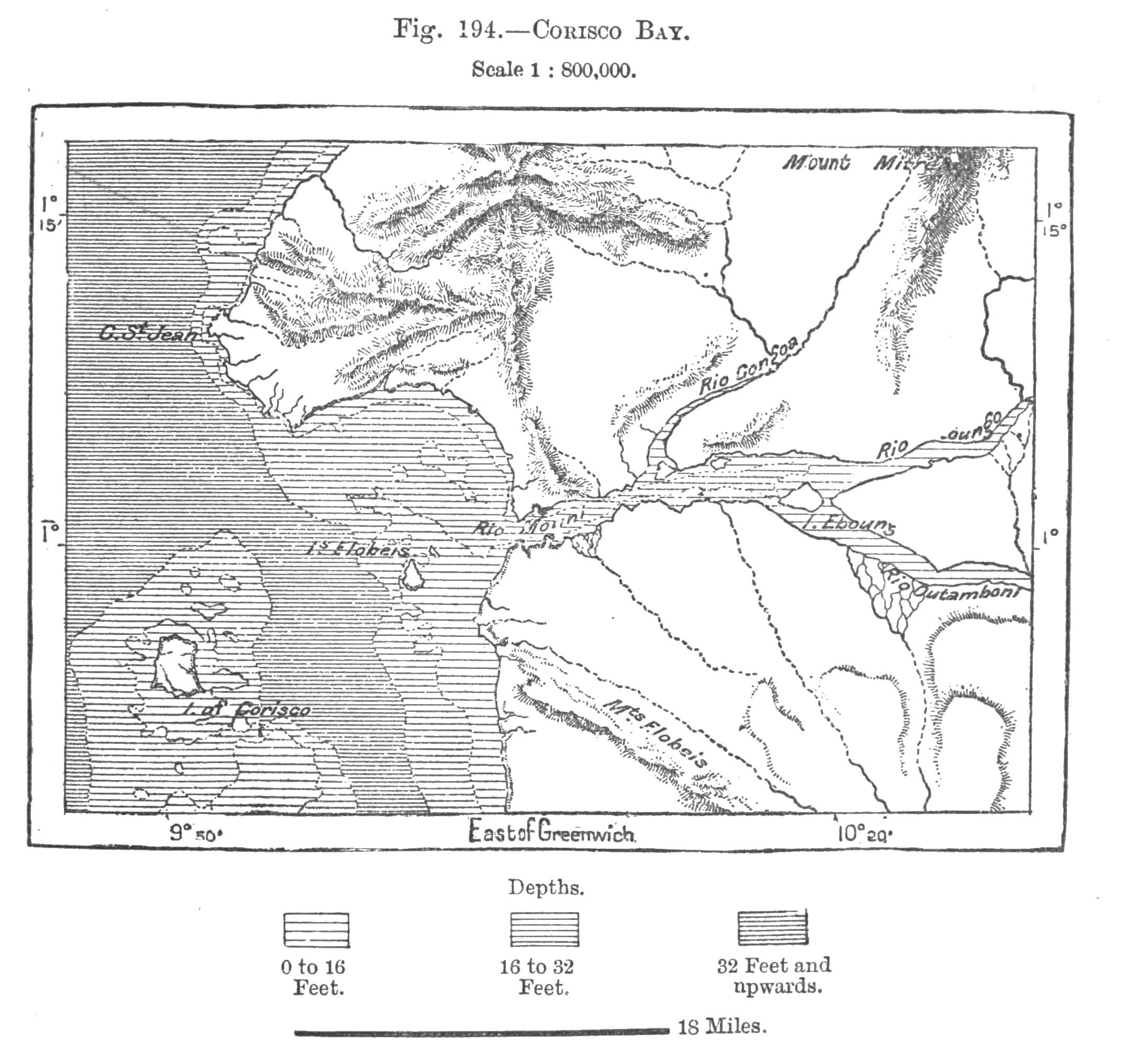
Topographic map of the Bay of Corisco from 1892, where the Benga people inhabit.

The Benga people are one of 14 Ndowe tribes of Equatorial Guinea and traditionally have been Fishermen, Sailors and Merchants. They are thought to have historically inhabited the interior of Equatorial Guinea prior to European contact, only making their way to the coast to better trade with European powers. By 1770 the Benga were noted to inhabit the island of Corisco, that had recently been uninhabited prior to their occupation due to over-enslavement on the island by the French. The Benga traditionally practiced slavery in their culture, enslaving neighboring tribes and partook in the Trans-atlantic slave trade. By the mid-19th century with Britain outlawing the Trans-atlantic slave trade it began putting pressure via its military to stop in the trafficking of human beings especially in the Bight of Biafra where British military occupation took place in Equatorial Guinea, thus essentially ending the slave trade.

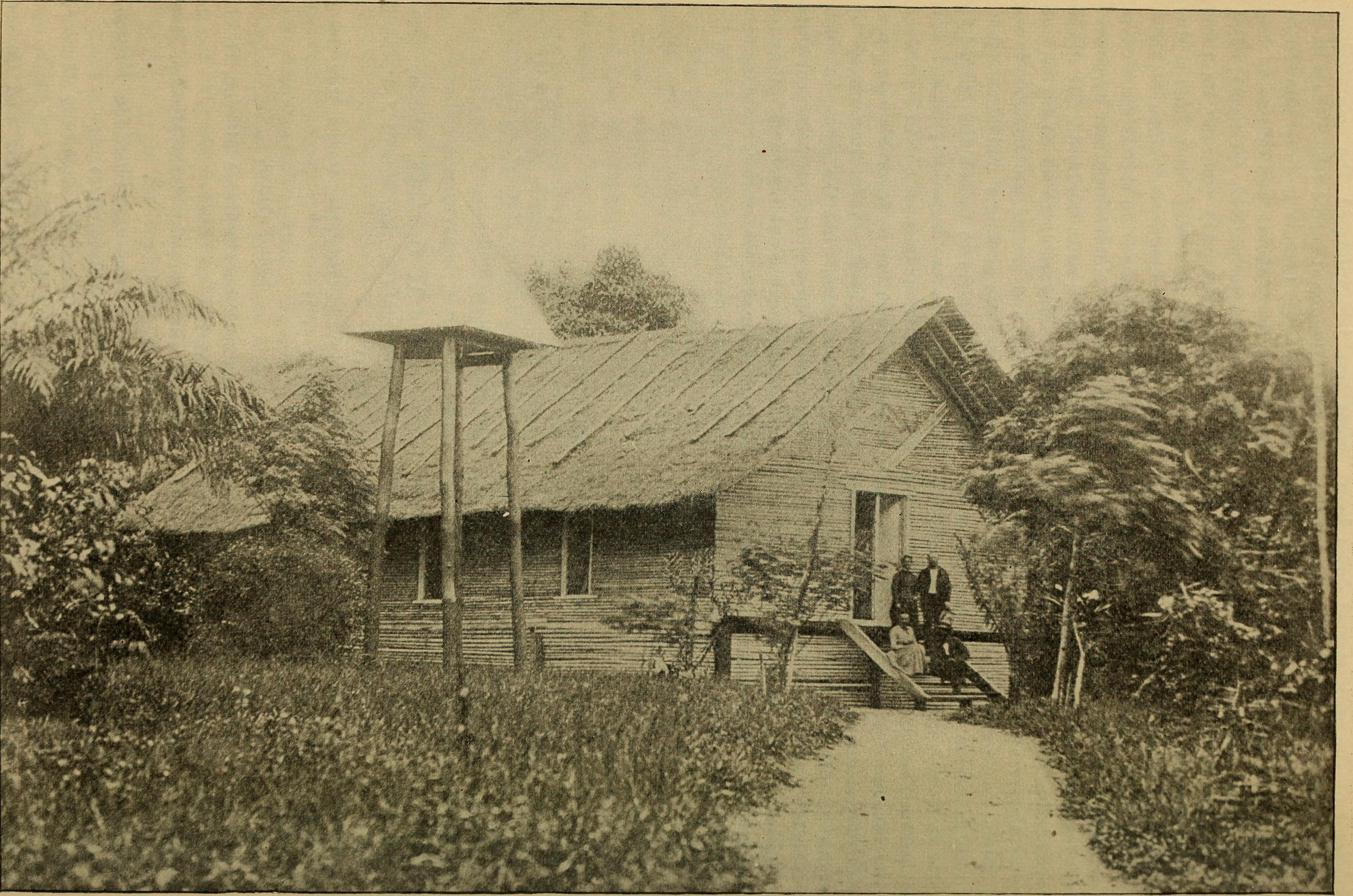
House of a Presbyterian missionary in Corisco. (1895)

By 1857 American missionaries began to set up missions in Corisco, but by 1943 most left due to the Second World War. After which most Benga left the island in search for better opportunities.

== Notable people ==
- Samuel L. Jackson – American actor, is descended from the Benga people.
