= Elobey Grande =

Island of Equatorial Guinea

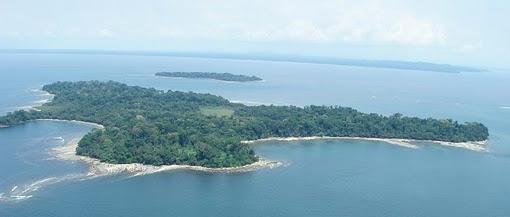

- Location within Equatorial Guinea

Geography
- Location: Gulf of Guinea
- Coordinates: 0°59′N 9°30′E

Administration
- Equatorial Guinea

Corisco Island and the Elobey Islands

Elobey Grande, or Great Elobey, is an island of Equatorial Guinea, lying at the mouth of the Mitémélé River. It is sparsely inhabited. Elobey Chico is a smaller island offshore, now uninhabited but once the colonial capital of the Río Muni. The island is located in the Gulf of Guinea.

== See also ==
- Elobey, Annobón and Corisco
