= Gulf of Guinea =

Northeasternmost part of the tropical Atlantic Ocean

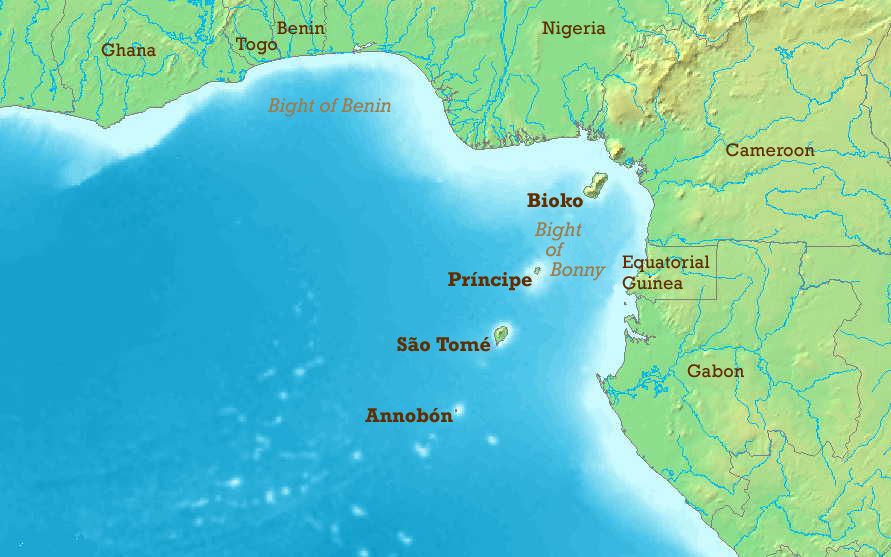
- Gulf of Guinea map showing the chain of islands formed by the Cameroon line of volcanoes

- Location within Africa
- Coordinates: 0°0′N 0°0′E
- River sources: Niger
- Ocean/sea sources: Atlantic Ocean
- Basin countries: Liberia, Ivory Coast, Ghana, Togo, Benin, Nigeria, Cameroon, Equatorial Guinea, Gabon, São Tomé and Príncipe, Republic of the Congo, Democratic Republic of the Congo, Angola
- Surface area: 755,000 km^{2} (292,000 sq mi)
- Islands: Bioko, São Tomé, Príncipe, Ilhéu Bom Bom, Ilhéu Caroço, Elobey Grande, Elobey Chico, Annobón, Corisco, Bobowasi

The Gulf of Guinea (French: Golfe de Guinée; Spanish: Golfo de Guinea; Portuguese: Golfo da Guiné) is the northeasternmost part of the tropical Atlantic Ocean from Cape Lopez in Gabon, north and west to Cape Palmas in Liberia. Null Island, defined as the intersection of the Equator and Prime Meridian (zero degrees latitude and longitude), is in the gulf.

Among the many rivers that drain into the Gulf of Guinea are the Niger and the Volta. The coastline on the gulf includes the Bight of Benin and the Bight of Bonny.

== Name ==
"Guinea" is thought to have originated from a local name for an area in the region, although the specifics are disputed. Bovill (1995) gives a thorough description:

The name Guinea is usually said to have been a corrupt form of the name Ghana, picked up by the Portuguese in the Maghrib. The present writer finds this unacceptable. The name Guinea has been in use both in the Maghrib and in Europe long before Prince Henry's time. For example, on a map dated about 1320 by the Genoese cartographer Giovanni di Carignano, who got his information about Africa from a fellow-countryman in Sijilmassa [ancient trading city in North Africa], we find Gunuia, and in the Catalan atlas of 1375 as Ginyia. A passage in Leo [Africanus] (vol. III, 822) points to Guinea having been a corrupt form of Jenne [2,000-year-old city in central Mali on Niger river], less famous than Ghana but nevertheless for many centuries famed in the Maghrib as a great market and a seat of learning. The relevant passage reads: "The Kingdom of Ghinea . . . called by the merchants of our nation Gheneoa, by the natural inhabitants thereof Genni and by the Portugals and other people of Europe Ghinea." But it seems more probable that Guinea derives from aguinaou, the Berber for Negro. Marrakech [city in southeastern Morocco] has a gate, built in the twelfth century, called the Bab Aguinaou, the Gate of the Negro (Delafosse, Haut-Sénégal-Niger, II, 277–278). The modern application of the name Guinea to the coast dates only from 1481. In that year the Portuguese built a fort, São Jorge da Mina (modern-day Elmina), on the Gold Coast region, and their king, John II, was permitted by the Pope [Sixtus II or Innocent VIII] to style himself Lord of Guinea, a title that survived until the recent extinction of the monarchy.

The name "Guinea" was also previously applied to the south coast of West Africa (north of the Gulf of Guinea), which became known as "Upper Guinea", and to the west coast of Southern Africa (to the east), which became known as "Lower Guinea".

Today, the word "Guinea" is found in the names of three countries in Africa (Guinea, Guinea-Bissau, and Equatorial Guinea), and in one country in Melanesia (Papua New Guinea).

== Geography ==
The main river dispensing its waters in the gulf is the Niger River.

Different definitions of the geographic limits of the Gulf of Guinea are given; the International Hydrographic Organization defines the southwest extent of the Gulf of Guinea as A line running Southeastward from Cape Palmas in Liberia to Cape Lopez (0°38′ S, 8°42′ E). This definition is shown by line "B" on the image below and puts the area of the gulf at roughly 755,000km^{2} is also used by the US Geological Survey and United Nations.

The larger definition, shown as area "D", A 2021 has been used by the French government, including a 2021 report by the French Ministry of the Armed Forces 2.35 million km^{2}. This definition makes the Gulf of Guinea 800,000 km^{2} larger than the Gulf of Mexico, although the smaller, IHO definition is more commonly used.

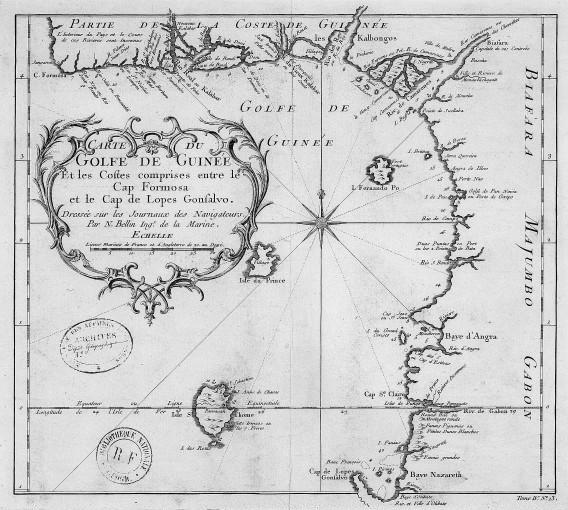
Old French map of the Gulf of Guinea

Different limits of the Gulf of Guinea

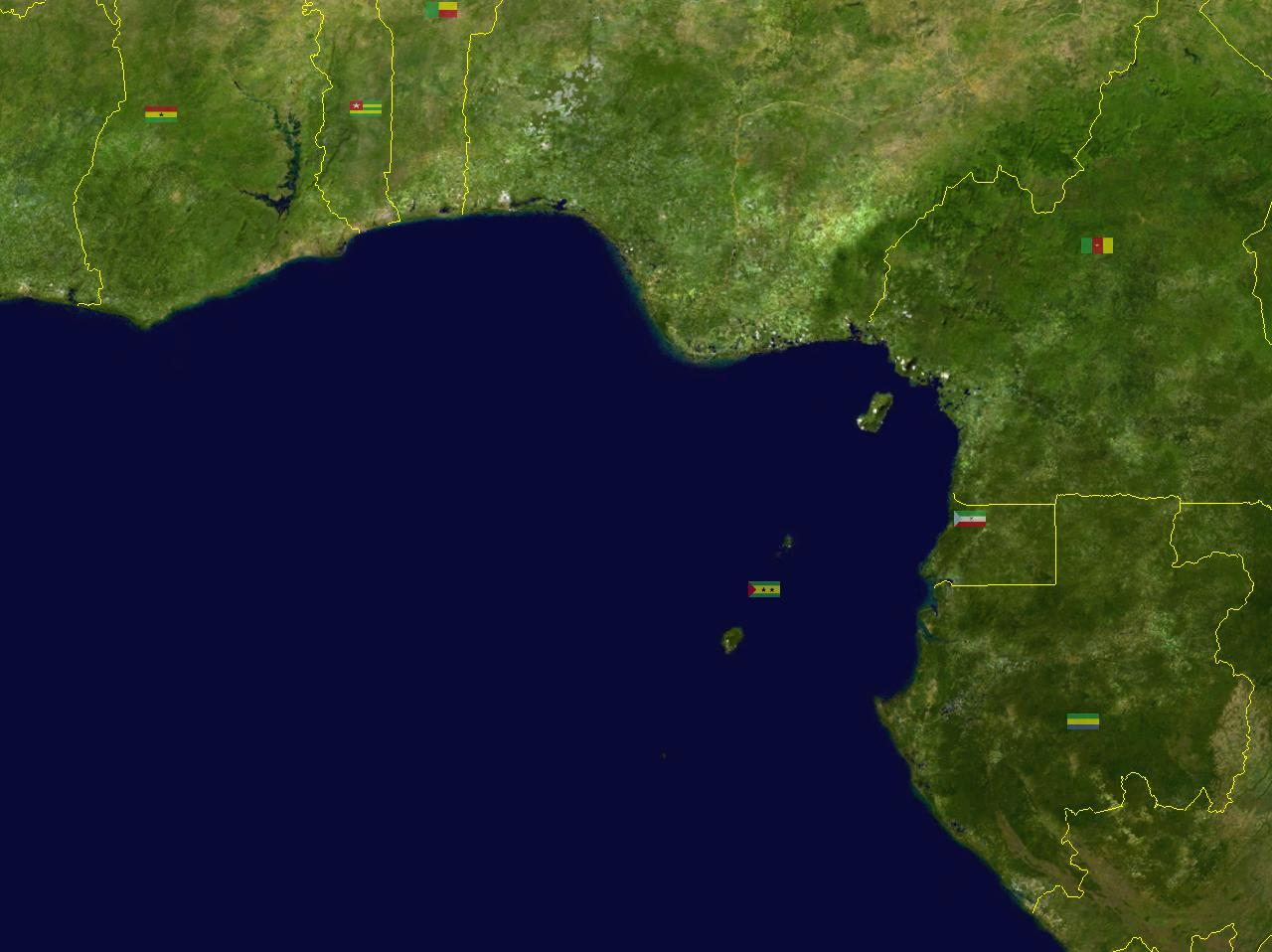
Satellite imagery of the Gulf of Guinea showing borders of states on its shores

=== Islands in the Gulf of Guinea ===
The Gulf of Guinea contains a number of islands, the largest of which are in a southwest-northeast chain, forming part of the Cameroon line of volcanoes.

- Annobón, also known as Pagalu or Pigalua, is an island that is part of Equatorial Guinea.
- Bobowasi Island is an island off the west coast of Africa in the Gulf of Guinea that is part of the Western Region of Ghana.
- Bioko is an island off the Ambazonian region of Cameroon in the Gulf of Guinea under the sovereignty of Equatorial Guinea.
- Corisco is an island belonging to Equatorial Guinea, as are the two small islands of Elobey Grande and Elobey Chico.

São Tomé and Príncipe (officially the Democratic Republic of São Tomé and Príncipe) is a Portuguese-speaking island nation in the Gulf of Guinea that became independent from Portugal in 1975. It is located off the western equatorial coast of Africa and consists of two islands, São Tomé and Príncipe. They are located about 140 kilometres (87 mi) apart and about 250 and 225 kilometres (155 and 140 mi), respectively, off the northwestern coast of Gabon. Both islands are part of an extinct volcanic mountain range. São Tomé, the sizeable southern island, is situated just north of the Equator.

== Maritime security ==
Maritime security in the Gulf of Guinea consists of 18 sovereign states.

Multiple institutional mandates address maritime security in the Gulf of Guinea: the Economic Community of West African States (ECOWAS) and the Economic Community of Central African States (ECCAS). Additionally, maritime security in the Gulf of Guinea is also addressed by the Gulf of Guinea Commission (GGC).

There has been a 60% population growth in the Gulf of Guinea since 2000, which consequently leads people to resort to hijacking, kidnapping, robberies, and more due to food shortages.

Climate change has become a huge problem in the Gulf of Guinea and as a consequence has different Maritime security issues become more pressing. These maritime security crimes are characterized not only by piracy but by a myriad of maritime crimes despite piracy often dominating the conversation on maritime security. The other notable crimes in the Gulf of Guinea are illegal fishing, kidnapping for ransom, drug trafficking, and oil-bunkering. Illegal oil-bunkering consists of the attacking of vessels transporting oil and transferring the oil to the thieves’ own vessel, after which the oil is sold in local and international markets. Illegal oil bunkering at sea is mainly prevalent in the Nigerian waters.

Kidnapping for ransom is also one of the most prevalent maritime crimes in the region. Between 2018 and 2019, the number of crew members that were kidnapped in the Gulf of Guinea increased by 50%, leading the region to account for 90% of global kidnappings at sea. About 92% of the hostage-taking and 73% of kidnappings happening in and around Africa are happening in the Gulf of Guinea. There is also a large issue of drug trafficking in the Gulf of Guinea and the region has over the last few years become a haven for drug trafficking mainly from South America into Europe.

Despite a decline in reported piracy incidents since the early 2020s, the Gulf of Guinea remained affected by maritime insecurity. Maritime security organizations continue to report kidnappings for ransom and armed robbery incidents in the region. Incidents of kidnapping for ransom continued to be reported in 2025 and 2026. In May 2025, armed pirates boarded a cargo ship travelling between Cameroon and the Democratic Republic of the Congo, abducting a crew member while the remaining crew sheltered in the vessel's citadel.

A vessel hijacking that occurred between Nigeria and São Tomé and Príncipe was one of 12 piracy-related incidents reported in the Gulf of Guinea during the first half of the year. Maritime security analysts reported an increase in kidnappings for ransom at sea during the same period. According to maritime security researcher Tayo Akinpelumi, anti-piracy measures in the Bight of Biafra contributed to changes in pirate tactics, with groups increasingly targeting government officials and other high-value individuals. Akinpelumi stated that such attacks were typically carried out at night by groups of approximately ten armed pirates using fast boats and were often completed within minutes. He also estimated that pirates collected approximately US$400,000 in ransom payments in Nigeria between July 2022 and June 2023. In December 2025, the Portuguese-flagged LPG carrier CGAS Saturn was boarded by pirates while sailing toward Malabo, Equatorial Guinea. The attack occurred about 93 km (50 nautical miles) offshore and resulted in the kidnapping of nine crew members and the injury of another. On January 10 2026, armed attackers abducted nine crew members from the fishing vessel IB Fish 7 in Gabonese waters. In February 2026, gunmen attacked and robbed fishing boats off the coast of Ghana.

=== Illegal, unreported, and unregulated (IUU) fishing ===
IUU fishing also known as Illegal, unreported and unregulated fishing has become a severe problem in the Gulf of Guinea. In 2000 were there reports of 212,800 tons of fish caught and in 2012, this number increased by 9 percent to 232,200 tons. IUU consequently creates spillover problems to the social, economic, and environmental life in the Gulf of Guinea. It presents a direct threat to the national security of the coastal states in the Gulf of Guinea. IUU has been linked to multiple issues and forms of organized crime. Some of these crimes are arms trafficking, drug smuggling, forced labor, piracy and more.

IUU depletes fish stocks in the area and causes issues for fishermen and the local population food security. One of the main issues of IUU is that a lot of the fish that is caught in the Gulf of Guinea is fish that is unreported when caught. This causes overfishing and overfishing causes depleting fisheries all around the region. IUU fishing also becomes a severe issue in the region because it allows fishermen to fish in vessels that are not nationally regulated or managed. Furthermore, can these vessels threaten people's human security due to poor working conditions and poorly regulated boats? Many of the IUU fishing boats are old, rusty, and often in poor condition.

Both small-scale and large-scale fisheries often do illegal fishing in the Gulf of Guinea. In the Gulf of Guinea can we see severe blue crime spillover effects of IUU through both piracy and human trafficking. Economic activity in the Gulf of Guinea has given rise to maritime piracy in the region. It is evident that in the Gulf of Guinea is there more piracy, forced labor and human trafficking as a consequence of IUU fishing, depleting fish stock and large competition of resources and food.

=== Further blue crime consequences of IUU ===
There have been many reports of forced labor at sea in the Gulf of Guinea on illegal fishing boats. The EJF reports that through their studies they found that some fishermen and immigrant workers have been forced to work on fishing boats in the Gulf of Guinea for months at a time without access to land. Some of these workers were deployed to sea each day in canoes and in the night where they were forced to return to the mother ship to unload fish. Many illegal fishing boats have operated like such for many years and the workers are often contracted for two years at a time, with no chance to visit home or at times even land in general.

Many workers are paid in boxes of what the EJF called "trash fish" -caught as by-catch- and then the way they would earn money was to further sell this fish. Other reports of forced labor on illegal fishing boats report poor and non-existent safety equipment. Little to no hygiene standards, poor accommodation standards, and very little food.

Even though piracy in the Gulf of Guinea has dropped since its peak in 2020, is it still a pressing issue in the region. Many pirate groups in the Gulf of Guinea often recruit unemployed and underemployed fishermen. This has become highly lucrative due to poor wages and little to no money going around. Often have these local fishermen been lured into the prospect of quick easy money and as a result sold their fishing boats to other pirates in the Gulf. Depleting fishing stocks encourages fishermen to engage in piracy and more violence in the region is occurring.

== See also ==
- Cetacean strandings in Ghana
- Guineaman, a slave ship from the region of Guinea
