= Elobey Chico =

Island of Equatorial Guinea

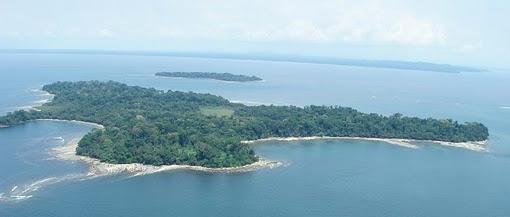

- Location within Equatorial Guinea

Geography
- Coordinates: 1°00′01″N 9°31′03″E

Administration
- Equatorial Guinea

Corisco Island and the Elobey Islands

Elobey Chico, or Little Elobey, is a small island off the coast of Equatorial Guinea, lying 6.5 km from the mouth of the Mitémélé River. The island is now uninhabited but was once the de facto colonial capital of the Spanish territory of Río Muni. Officially, the island was associated with Fernando Pó, but the connection seemed to be little more than fiction. The majority of the factories were owned by Hamburg Merchants.

The island is on the 1st degree north latitude circle.

== See also ==
- Elobey, Annobón and Corisco
