= Corisco =

Island of Equatorial Guinea

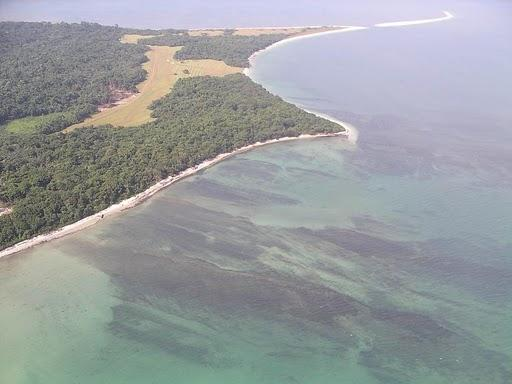

- Corisco Island and Elobey Islands

- Location within Equatorial Guinea

Geography
- Coordinates: 0°54′54″N 9°19′12″E
- Area: 14 km^{2} (5.4 sq mi)
- Length: 6 km (3.7 mi)
- Width: 5 km (3.1 mi)
- Highest point: 35 m

Administration
- Equatorial Guinea
- Litoral
- Insular Region

Additional information
- Time zone: WAT (UTC+1)

Corisco, Mandj, or Mandyi, is a small island of Equatorial Guinea, located 29 km (18 mi) southwest of the Río Muni estuary that defines the border with Gabon. Corisco, whose name derives from the Portuguese word for lightning, has an area of 14 km^{2} (5 sq mi), and its highest point is 35 m (115 ft) above sea level. The most important settlement on the island is Gobe.

== History ==
During the Iron Age (49 BC – 1401 AD) and before the arrival of the Portuguese, the island was densely settled. The most important evidence of human occupation comes from the area of Nandá, near the eastern coast, where dozens of prehistoric burials have been excavated. These burials belong to two different periods: Early Iron Age (50 BC - 450 AD) and Middle Iron Age (1000-1150 AD). During the first period, the islanders deposited bundles of human bones and iron implements (axes, bracelets, spears, spoons, iron currency) in shallow pits dug in the sand. During the second period, tombs have been documented where the corpses (not preserved) lay surrounded by pots, probably containing food and alcoholic beverages. The deceased were interred with their adornments (collars, bracelets and anklets) and a few personal possessions (knives and adzes).

When Portuguese sailors arrived in the Mino Estuary in 1471, they noted that the islands in the area were mainly unpopulated. They named Corisco after 'lightning', due to the gales they experienced around the island. After more than three centuries of abandonment, when it was sporadically visited by European sailors, Corisco was settled by the Benga people. They arrived during the second half of the 18th century attracted by the prospects of trade with the Europeans. The island was later acquired by Spain in 1843, as a result of an arrangement made by Juan José Lerena y Barry with Benga king Bonkoro I. Bonkoro I died in 1846 and was succeeded by his son Bonkoro II, but due to rivalries on the island, Bonkoro II moved to São Tomé, and Munga I ruled in Corisco 1848 to 1858, his son Munga II taking over, and meeting the explorer Manuel Iradier in the 1870s.

In general, the Spanish paid little attention to Corisco. In the early part of the 20th century it was part of the administration of Elobey, Annobón, and Corisco, and postage stamps were issued under that name. It became an integral part of Equatorial Guinea upon independence.

Corisco and the surrounding waters of Corisco Bay have become of interest in recent years for their oil prospects. A consortium of Elf Aquitaine and Petrogab began prospecting in 1981. The area is disputed with Gabon because of the perceived value of the oil. In February 2003, Gabonese Defence Minister Ali-Ben Bongo Ondimba visited the islands and re-stated Gabon's claim to them. Prior to 2025, there had been efforts to settle the territorial disputes between Equatorial Guinea and Gabon through mediation and litigation. On May 19, 2025, the International Court of Justice issued its decision that legal title to the Mbanie Island, and two other smaller islets, Cocoteros and Conga, was held by Spain, which then transferred it to Equatorial Guinea upon its independence in 1968, not Gabon.

== See also ==
- Corisco International Airport
