= 1969 Equatorial Guinea coup attempt =

Failed overthrow of President Macías

Location of Equatorial Guinea in Africa

The 1969 Equatorial Guinea coup attempt was an alleged coup attempt carried out in Equatorial Guinea on the night of 4–5 March 1969, with the aim of overthrowing President Francisco Macías Nguema. The leaders of the coup attempt were reportedly Foreign Minister Atanasio Ndongo Miyone and the country's permanent representative to the United Nations, Saturnino Ibongo Iyanga. The coup allegedly had the support of the Spanish government, and its failure led to the establishment of a dictatorial regime by Macías, which lasted until the 1979 coup d'état.

Currently, there are several versions of how the events unfolded, so an official account has not yet been established.

== Background ==
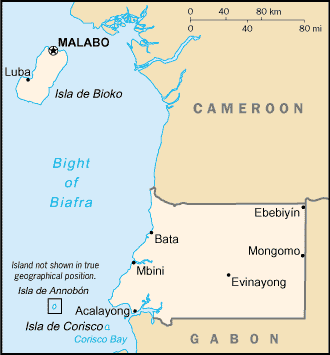
A CIA WFB map of Equatorial Guinea

During the 1969 diplomatic crisis between Spain and Equatorial Guinea, Ndongo and Ibongo traveled to Madrid to meet with Spanish government and financial figures (including Foreign Minister Fernando María Castiella), as well as Guineans residing in Spain. There are indications that the objective of these meetings was to compile a list of people who could form a government.

After the meetings in Spain, on 1 March Ndongo and Ibongo flew to Santa Isabel. Ibongo stayed on Fernando Poo, while Ndongo arrived in Bata on 3 March.

== Development ==
In the early morning of 4–5 March, Ndongo arrived at the Presidential Palace in Bata along with some trusted military personnel and a group of naval officers from Mbini, neutralizing the presidential guard and placing his own guard.

Previously, several politicians, officials and soldiers had been taken hostage (among them Esteban Nsue, government delegate in Bata, Pedro Lumu, mayor of Bata; Minister of the Interior Ángel Masié, his brother Miguel Eyegue, governor of Río Muni, and Commander Manuel Tray, then head of the Military House of the Head of State). The hostages were divided into two groups: one group was locked in a room in the palace and the other was transferred to a Maritime Guard barracks. Prior to the coup, the executors took over the city's radio station, whose broadcast silence was the password established so that the supporters of the coup residing on Fernando Poo would know that everything was being carried out successfully. A plane left from Santa Isabel with Ibongo and other coup plotters on board.

Ndongo occupied the presidential office and gave the order to assassinate Macías, who was not in the palace, since he had already been warned of a possible coup attempt. Ndongo looked for Macías but when he could not find him, he believed he had escaped.

The way in which Macías found out about what was happening varies according to the different versions: one version states that Ndongo went to the Territorial Guard barracks (given that he had little military support) and asked the officer Salvador Elá (who would be one of the commanders of the 1979 coup) to put his troops at the disposal of the coup movement. Elá, according to this version, flatly refused and notified Macías, while Ndongo returned to the presidential palace. Another version claims that Elá was part of the group detained by the coup plotters, and that the person who notified Macías was the cook of the presidential palace, who managed to escape from there and notify the President, who was sleeping in his private home. Other stories claim that Macías was already in the palace when Ndongo arrived, or that he knew exactly of his minister's plans and that morning, together with his loyal forces, he waited for the moment to act.

Upon learning of the plot, Macías rallied Elá's troops and members of the "Youth in March with Macías" and marched to the Presidential Palace. Upon arrival, they disarmed the guard the coup plotters had posted at the gate and freed the hostages. Ibongo, who was inside the palace, was then taken prisoner (according to some accounts, killed on the spot). Meanwhile, Macías went up to the presidential office to confront Ndongo, who shortly thereafter fell out of a window of the presidential palace. Some accounts claim he was thrown out by Macías, while others maintain he jumped himself in an attempt to escape. Upon landing, he broke his leg.

According to some accounts, Ndongo was asleep when Macías entered the office. Upon entering the office, Macías allegedly shouted at him: "Atanasio, you can't do this to me!".

During the following hours, the hostages detained in the Maritime Guard barracks were released and Civil Guard troops appeared at the Presidential Palace to help maintain public order.

Ndongo remained on the ground for five hours; during that time he was tortured by the "Youth in March with Macías". Macías took several photographs of Ndongo dying, which he would later show to Newsweek magazine correspondent John Barnes. Later, Macías ordered that Ndongo be taken to the hospital, although the next day he would be transferred to prison. According to some sources, Ndongo died in prison on 26 March.

On the morning of 5 March, the version circulating in Bata about the events was that Ndongo had carried out a counter-coup to save Macías from being deposed by another coup. As the hours passed, the facts became clearer.

There are versions that even deny the existence of the coup d'état, and say that Macías called Ndongo to the palace with the excuse of a council of ministers meeting and then the premeditated murder of Ndongo and the other supposedly involved took place. There are those who consider that it would have constituted, as a result, a self-coup.

== Consequences ==
=== Break with Spain and the beginning of repression ===
On the morning of 5 March, Macías thanked the Spanish ambassador Juan Luis Pan de Soraluce for Spain's neutrality, hours later accusing this country of having instigated the attempt. Macías described the coup attempt as "imperialist and colonialist" and as a "combination of loggers and Spanish capitalists", while Spanish ministers Manuel Fraga and Fernando María Castiella flatly denied any type of Spanish intervention. Macías ordered the freezing of all bank accounts of Spaniards residing in the country, and the closure of all Spanish companies in Guinean territory, and announced that "Spanish capitalism has been definitively defeated". On 8 March, Macías announced that he himself would be in charge of the Foreign Affairs portfolio and ordered the Minister of the Interior Ángel Masié to requisition all existing firearms in the country, with which Macías would arm his "Youth".

There are debates about Spain's actions: there are historians who defend the country's non-interference, while others claim that the opposite happened and that Castiella even sent a telegram to Ndongo congratulating him on being the new president. There are those who have suggested that this was false, since the telegram sent by Castiella contained a message unrelated to the coup. Another argument in favor of Spain is that if this country had intervened, its military force would have been sufficient to ensure the overwhelming success of the coup.

It has been stated that Spanish military instructors participated in the coup plot, that Spain had agreed with Ndongo to send reinforcements, and that Ndongo received financial support from Spain. Macías himself stated during his trial in 1979 that Ndongo received US$50,000,000 from Castiella to overthrow him. According to some accounts, the Civil Guard refused to intervene since Macías had not been arrested, and the success of the attempt was not assured. More neutral versions indicate that Spain knew of the minister's plans, but simply did not intervene.

After the coup, Macías undertook a purge of the entire administrative and political apparatus of the country, beginning a dictatorial regime. A state of emergency was declared and the "Youth in March with Macías" spread terror in the streets of the country. Several politicians, namely Ibongo, Pastor Torao Sikara, President of the National Assembly, Armando Balboa, Minister of Information and Tourism, and political opponent Bonifacio Ondó Edú, were immediately arrested and murdered. Other ministers and officials, who were related to the attempted coup, have also been murdered or persecuted in the aftermath, among them Gustavo Watson Bueco (died in 1972) and Agustín Nve, deputies in the National Assembly, Enrique Gori (died in 1972), President of the Provincial Council of Fernando Poo and Federico Ngomo (died in 1971), President of the Provincial Council of Río Muni. To them should be added many other politicians such as Norberto Balboa, Vicente Ntutumu, Luis Angue Bacale and Santiago Osa. This was followed by Spain's request to the UN to send observers (who arrive on 10 March to Santa Isabel and on 13 March to Bata) and other diplomatic initiatives, such as negotiations with the Ethiopian Emperor Haile Selassie or an urgent request to the International Red Cross related to the events.

The failure generated a wave of popular anti-Spanish indignation (stimulated by the government), so the Spanish community felt threatened. This entire situation resulted in the worsening of the diplomatic crisis. In a telegram, Francisco Franco announced to Macías that the "crisis suffered in the country produces in Spanish residents the impression that there is a lack of security and guarantee in a hostile environment". The evacuation of the vast majority of the 7,500 Spaniards residing in the country was then ordered (supervised by international observers) and the withdrawal of the Civil Guard troops also assigned there. The UN mission managed to impose a two-month deadline for the withdrawal of Spaniards and troops, which ended on 5 April.

=== Long-term consequences ===
In 1970, with his dictatorship already established, Macías banned all political parties and in their place established the United National Workers' Party (PUNT) as the only political party. The following year Macías personally assumed all the powers of the state, and in 1973 he promulgated a new constitution, which provided legal support to his regime. Macías' dictatorial regime, during which around 50,000 people were murdered and a strongly anti-imperialist sentiment inspired by the rivalry that arose with Spain after the coup, would last until 1979, when he was overthrown by Teodoro Obiang.

During the Macías' regime, the date of 5 March acquired great significance, establishing the celebration of "Victory Day". In the celebrations, plays were frequently organized that represented the failed coup attempt.

Given the multiplicity of versions that exist about the development of the coup, even today a single and official account of the events has not been established.

I haven't yet found, let's say, a logical and acceptable account of the events. Why? Because those events remain confusing and, in my opinion, excessively exaggerated. Although it's logical that they were exaggerated because the result was catastrophic (...).

— Donato Ndongo-Bidyogo

Currently, 5 March is considered by Teodoro Obiang's opponents as the date on which the democratic regime in Equatorial Guinea ended.
