= 1976 Equatorial Guinea coup attempt =

Failed overthrow of President Macías

Location of Equatorial Guinea in Africa

The 1976 Equatorial Guinea coup attempt was an alleged plot in Equatorial Guinea in November 1976 to overthrow President Francisco Macías Nguema, in which a large number of religious figures from the Catholic Church in the country were involved, as well as political opponents.

== Development ==
=== Background ===
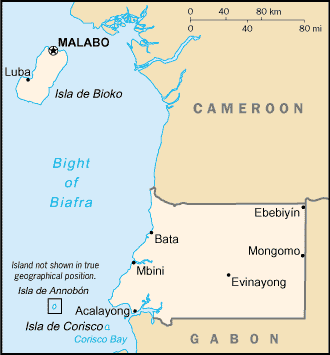
A CIA WFB map of Equatorial Guinea

In August 1973, the country had approved a new Constitution. A few months earlier, in January, there had been an attempted coup, thwarted by Spain, as a result of which troops were confined to their barracks and placed on high alert.

In June 1974, Radio Malabo and Radio Ecuatorial Bata announced news of a plot orchestrated from Bata with foreign material and financial support. The alleged mastermind behind the plot was Estanislao Ngune Beohli and a group called the Crusade for the Liberation of Equatorial Guinea for Christ. A military trial was held between 22 and 25 June in Bata against 90 alleged conspirators, resulting in 27 death sentences and long prison terms for the remaining defendants. The executions of those sentenced to death took place on 26 June.

At the beginning of June 1976, a guerrilla group from the National Alliance for Democratic Restoration (ANRD) attacked a military post in the town of Evinayong, in Centro Sur province.

=== Arrests ===
The conflict erupted in November 1976, when several members of the government openly criticized certain aspects of President Macías' administration.

Following the government's announcement of its discovery of an alleged conspiracy to carry out a coup, there was initially a wave of arrests in the capital Malabo allegedly linked to the coup attempt, including:

- Ponciano Mbomio Nvó, a native of Aton Nsomo, Ebibeyin district, Kié-Ntem province, then a high-ranking official of the Ministry of Education, on 28 November 1976. Also the Secretary General of the Ministry of Education, Job Obiang Mba.
- On 29 November 1976: Father José Esono Mitogo (director of the Malabo secondary school), Professor Jonás Leopoldo Mitui, police officer Pablo Guillermo Nseng, government member Manuel Nsi Mba, former Vice President of the Republic Miguel Eyegue Ntutumu, Secretary General of the Ministry of Health Faustino Edu Oyono, Guillermo Akapo Day, Mauricio Oko Endje, and another official from the Ministry of Education, José Abeso Tomo. A week later, José Mañana Esono was also arrested.
- On 3 December 1976: Jesús Alfonso Oyono Alogo, active pre-independence politician of the Monalige and Minister of Public Works; Buenaventura Ochaga Ngono, Minister of Education and permanent general secretary of the ruling United National Workers' Party (PUNT), and Norberto Nsue Micha, Secretary of Public Works.

Once informed, the president, who was already residing in Bata, the country's second capital, decided that the then Secretary of Defense and head of security should appoint the members of the court-martial or military tribunal tasked with judging those involved. The trials were to be held in each of the defendants' districts, but this plan was ultimately not implemented. During those days and in the following weeks, numerous detainees were murdered while in the custody of the army, specifically at the hands of the warden of Black Beach prison, Sergeant Salvador Ondó Elá:

- On 4 December 1976, two of the top political figures in the government and trusted confidants of President Macías, Jesús Alfonso Oyono Alogo and Buenaventura Ochaga, were assassinated.
- Between 11 and 14 December 1976, José Esono Mitogo, Pablo Guillermo Nseng, and Manuel Nsi Mba were murdered.

Their bodies were never discovered; the other detainees who were not killed were severely tortured. These killings were denounced by the National Alliance for Democratic Restoration (ANRD), an opposition organization to the regime of Francisco Macías.

However, other cases occurred later: in January 1977, Mauricio Oko Endje died at Malabo Airport during his arrest, and Rafael Mambo Matala died at Malabo Regional Hospital as a result of the beating he received that same night. In July 1977, Jesús Ndong Buendi, former governor of the Central Bank of Equatorial Guinea, was executed by firing squad, accused of attempted currency evasion. Even later, on 18 January 1978, Minister Job Obiang Mba was murdered in prison, and his body was never found.

In total, more than 500 people were killed as a result of the attempted coup. At Black Beach prison, detainees were killed by other prisoners. Many of the detainees, due to their importance within the government, trusted that Macías would release them as soon as he learned of their arrest.

According to some journalistic sources and confessions from victims on social media, the then Commander-Secretary of Defense Teodoro Obiang played a key role in the repression of the alleged coup and the physical disappearance of these eminent members and leaders of the government administration. Other sources claim that Obiang, upon learning of the magnitude of the massacre, demanded that Salvador Ondó Elá end it and even released some prisoners. According to journalist Severo Moto Nsá, also imprisoned in Black Beach prison at that time, Job Obiang Mba revealed to him during a conversation that Obiang was involved in the coup and decided to sacrifice all the victims to absolve himself of guilt, after Macías detected the attempt.

The coup, according to an official statement from the Macías government, had been carried out with the collaboration of Spain. The deaths of those executed were officially justified as suicides, while it was indicated that the survivors would be subjected to a public trial.

=== Survivors ===
At midnight on 2 August 1979, Teodoro Obiang appeared at Black Beach Public Prison. It was announced that a coup d'état had been decided upon to save the people of Equatorial Guinea from the oppression they were suffering. All the detained military personnel joined the uprising and boarded a plane that same night to travel to the Continental Region, where President Macías had been residing since 1975; among the released was Captain Salvador Elá Nseng, who became Obiang's aide-de-camp and comrade-in-arms. On 4 August, all the remaining detainees were released from prison, including common criminals.

Ironically, Miguel Eyegue, a survivor of the 1976 massacre, was executed by firing squad alongside former president Macías on 29 September 1979, following their trial for criminal and political responsibility during Macías' regime. However, prison warden Salvador Ondó Elá, found guilty of multiple murders and sentenced to death in the same trial, was immediately acquitted by new president Teodoro Obiang.
