= Saturnino Ibongo Iyanga =

Equatoguinean politician, diplomat and journalist (1936–1969)

1st Permanent Representative of Equatorial Guinea to the United Nations
- In office November 12, 1968 – March 5, 1969
- President: Francisco Macías Nguema
- Preceded by: Office established
- Succeeded by: Unknown

Personal details
- Born: January 18, 1936 Bata, Río Muni, Spanish Guinea
- Died: March 6, 1969 (aged 33) Bata, Equatorial Guinea
- Party: National Liberation Movement of Equatorial Guinea
- Education: University of Navarra

Saturnino Ibongo Iyanga (January 18, 1936 – March 6, 1969) was an Equatoguinean politician, diplomat, journalist and the first permanent representative of Equatorial Guinea to the United Nations.

== Biography ==
Ibongo studied at the Escuela Superior Indígena, in Santa Isabel (present-day Malabo), obtaining his Master's degree. Between 1955 and 1959 he taught at the Generalísimo Franco School and at Ramón y Cajal, in the same city. In 1960 he moved to Spain, working as an official of the Ministry of Finance in the Provincial Council of Navarre. In 1964 he obtained his Bachelor's degree in journalism from the University of Navarra, and he worked for Diario Ébano and Agencia EFE. In the Constitutional Conference (1967–1968) that drafted the 1968 Constitution of Equatorial Guinea, he participated as spokesperson for the National Liberation Movement of Equatorial Guinea (MONALIGE).

Ibongo was one of the signatories of the Declaration of Independence of Equatorial Guinea, at the United Nations on July 7, 1968. He composed, in collaboration with Atanasio Ndongo Miyone, the national anthem of Equatorial Guinea that has been used since the country's independence. As permanent representative of Equatorial Guinea to the United Nations, he made his first participation there on November 12 of the same year, a month after the country's independence.

He was arrested and murdered under the regime of Francisco Macías Nguema in March 1969, after being accused of participating in the alleged coup attempt of March 5, 1969 led by the Minister of Foreign Affairs, Atanasio Ndongo Miyone. According to some sources, Ibongo was murdered in prison the next day.

Diplomatic posts
New title	Permanent Representative of Equatorial Guinea to the United Nations; 1968–1969	Succeeded by Unknown
