= Bubi Union =

Political party in Equatorial Guinea (1967–1970)

Bubi Union Unión Bubi
- Leader: Various
- President: Edmundo Bossio
- Founded: 1966–1967
- Dissolved: 1970
- Headquarters: Bioko, Equatorial Guinea
- Ideology: Independentism; Bubi separatism
- Political position: Right-wing
- Colors: Blue

Party flag

The Bubi Union (Spanish: Unión Bubi) was a socio-political group and later a political party in Equatorial Guinea, created to represent the interests of the Bubi people of the island of Bioko.

== History ==
=== Constitutional Conference ===
It was created for the participation in the Constitutional Conference (1967–1968) that drafted the 1968 Constitution of Equatorial Guinea. Its representatives were Mariano Ganet, Teófilo Bieveda, Gaspar Copariate Muebaque (the latter two were also members of Monalige) and Francisco Douga Mendo (former Secretary General of Monalige in Fernando Poo).

Its intention was the incorporation of the island of Fernando Poo into Spain, or failing that, an administration for the island different from that of Río Muni.

=== 1968 elections and entry into government ===
Transformed into a political party, in the 1968 general elections, its leader, Edmundo Bossio, obtained 5,000 votes (5.5%) in the first round for his candidacy as president, and 7 deputies in the National Assembly. For the second round of the presidential election, he gave his support to Francisco Macías Nguema, who was running through the Popular Idea of Equatorial Guinea (IPGE) party.

Other important names were that of Gustavo Watson Bueco, a disciple of Gregorio Marañón at the Complutense University of Madrid and a doctor at the Banapá seminary, who was one of the seven deputies of the Bubi Union in the National Assembly, and that of Enrique Gori Molubela, who had participated as vice-president of the General Assembly at the Constitutional Conference (1967–1968), showing himself to be against the unified independence of the Bubi and Fang peoples, and who advocated for the approval of the 1968 Constitution of Equatorial Guinea in the 1968 constitutional referendum.

=== Dissolution ===
Following the independence of Equatorial Guinea and the diplomatic crisis with Spain, its leaders were persecuted; Enrique Gori was tried and executed in June 1972, and Gustavo Watson also died in 1972. Edmundo Bossio was investigated by the Equatorial Guinean intelligence services in late 1974. He was placed under house arrest and murdered under the dictatorship of Francisco Macías in February 1975.

== See also ==
- Movement for the Self-Determination of Bioko Island
- Democratic Fernandino Union
