= List of political parties in Equatorial Guinea =

This article lists political parties in Equatorial Guinea. Equatorial Guinea is a dominant-party state with the Democratic Party of Equatorial Guinea in power. Although multiple parties are permitted by the Constitution of 1991, only one true opposition party operates openly, and there have been multiple accusations of electoral fraud.

== Parties ==
=== Main parties ===
Name	Abbr.	Founded	Leader	Political position	Ideology	Senate	Chamber of Deputies
Democratic Party of Equatorial Guinea; Partido Democrático de Guinea Ecuatorial	PDGE	1987	Teodoro Obiang Nguema	Big tent	African nationalism; Fang interests; Authoritarianism; Militarism	55 / 55	100 / 100
Convergence for Social Democracy; Convergencia para la Democracia Social	CPDS	1990	Santiago Obama Ndong	Centre-left	Democratic socialism; Social democracy	0 / 55	0 / 100

=== Other minor parties formed since 1991 ===
These parties, extremely small and ineffective, fall into three categories: those aligned with the government to provide a façade of democracy; the CPDS, which is allowed to operate openly but is still repressed; and those parties which are not registered with the government and are therefore illegal.

==== Larger illegal minor parties ====
- Movement for the Self-Determination of Bioko Island (Movimiento para la Auto-determinación de la Isla de Bioko)
- National Democratic Union of Equatorial Guinea (Unión Democrática Nacional de Guinea Ecuatorial)
- Progressive Democratic Alliance (Alianza Democrática Progresista)
- Progress Party of Equatorial Guinea (Partido del Progreso de Guinea Ecuatorial)
- Etomba a Ndowe-Ndowe People Party (Etomba a Ndowe- Partido del Pueblo Ndowe)

==== Other parties ====
- Bubi Union
- Co-operative of the Democratic Opposition (CODE)
- Democratic Development Union (UDD)
- Democratic Federal Party (PFD)
- Democratic Social Independent Party (PIDS)
- Equatorial Guinean Resistance (RGE) — politico-military organisation
- Guinean People's Liberation Force (FLPGE)
- Liberal Democratic Convention (CLD)
- Liberal Party of Equatorial Guinea (PLGE)
- Movement of Liberty and the Future of Equatorial Guinea (MOLIFUGE)
- National Alliance for Democratic Restoration (ANRD)
- National Movement for the Liberation of Equatorial Guinea (MONALIGE)
- National Resistance of Equatorial Guinea (RENAGE)
- Party of the Democratic Coalition (PCD) — alliance of MOLIFUGE, UB, and UDD
- Party of the Social Democratic Coalition (PCSD)
- Platform of the United Opposition (POC)
- Popular Action of Equatorial Guinea (AP)
- Popular Union of Equatorial Guinea (UP)
- Reformist Party of Equatorial Guinea (PRGE)
- Republican Democratic Force (FDR)
- Republican Union of Equatorial Guinea (UR)
- Social Democratic and Popular Convergence (CSDP)
- Social Democratic Party of Equatorial Guinea (PSD)
- Social Democratic Union of Equatorial Guinea (UDS)
- Socialist Party of Equatorial Guinea (PSGE)
- Union for Democracy and Social Development (UDDS)
- Union of Independent Democrats (UDI)
- Union of the Centre-Right (UCD)

=== Pre-Macías parties ===
- Democratic Fernandino Union
- Macías Group
- National Liberation Crusade
- National Liberation Front of Equatorial Guinea
- National Union Movement
- Popular Idea of Equatorial Guinea
- Popular Liberation Union of Equatorial Guinea
- Pro-Independence Movement of Equatorial Guinea
- United National Party
- United National Workers' Party
- Union Movement of Equatorial Guinea

== See also ==
- List of political parties by country
