= King Malabo =

King Malabo may refer to:

- Malabo Lopelo Melaka, (1837-1937) King Malabo (I)
- Francisco Malabo Beosá, (1896-2001) King Malabo (II)
