= Democratic Fernandino Union =

Political party in Equatorial Guinea (1967–1970)

Democratic Fernandino Union Unión Democrática Fernandina
- Abbreviation: UNDEMO
- President: Wilwardo Jones Niger
- Founded: 1967
- Dissolved: 1970
- Headquarters: Bioko, Equatorial Guinea
- Ideology: Independentism; Fernandino separatism
- Colors: Blue

The Democratic Fernandino Union (Spanish: Unión Democrática Fernandina, UNDEMO) was a political party in Equatorial Guinea, created to represent the interests of the Fernandino people of the island of Bioko.

== History ==
Like the Bubi Union, the party was created in 1967 for the participation in the Constitutional Conference (1967–1968) that drafted the 1968 Constitution of Equatorial Guinea. Its leader was Wilwardo Jones Niger, and other important figures were Carlos Cabrera James, Agustín Daniel Grange Molay, Manuel Nascimento Ceita, and Manuel Morgades Besari.

During the Constitutional Conference, UNDEMO, together with the Bubi Union, defended the separatist theses according to which the island of Fernando Poo should declare its independence separately from Río Muni.

In the 1968 general elections, it did not field its own presidential candidate and did not gain representation in the National Assembly. In the second round of the presidential elections, however, it supported the candidate of the Popular Idea of Equatorial Guinea (IPGE), Francisco Macías Nguema.

In 1970, UNDEMO was outlawed along with the other existing parties after Macías established the United National Workers' Party (PUNT) as the sole legal party and initiated a dictatorial regime that would last until the 1979 coup d'état.

== See also ==
- Movement for the Self-Determination of Bioko Island
- Bubi Union
