= 1982 Equatorial Guinea constitution =

Legal fundamental law of Equatorial guinea in 1973

Constitution of Equatorial Guinea of 1982
- Coat of Arms

Overview
- Jurisdiction: Republic of Equatorial Guinea
- Ratified: 15 August 1982
- Date effective: 15 September 1982
- System: Unitary republic (de jure); One-party state (de facto)
- Repealed: 16 November 1991

The Constitution of Equatorial Guinea of 1982 was the country's third constitution. Following the 1979 military coup that removed Francisco Macías Nguema from the presidency, a popular referendum obtained 95.8% of votes in favor of the new Constitution in August 1982. The Constitution, which the United Nations helped draft, added provisions for human rights, outlined a new free-market economy for the country, and nominally restored national elections.

President Teodoro Obiang Nguema Mbasogo, the leader of the 1979 coup and nephew of Macías, was effectively and officially established as president with the constitutional referendum, which bestowed upon him his first seven-year term in that role, despite leading the country since the coup.

Despite the appearance of democracy and respect for human rights in the Constitution, it also granted the president unilateral powers over such things as cabinet positions and the right to rule by decree, all of which has led to Obiang becoming the longest ruling non-royal leader in the world.

The Constitution was replaced with the current document in 1991 through another popular referendum, which legalized political parties beyond Obiang's Democratic Party of Equatorial Guinea.

== See also ==
- 1968 Equatorial Guinea constitution
- 1973 Equatorial Guinea constitution
- 1991 Equatorial Guinea constitution
