= Spanish music =

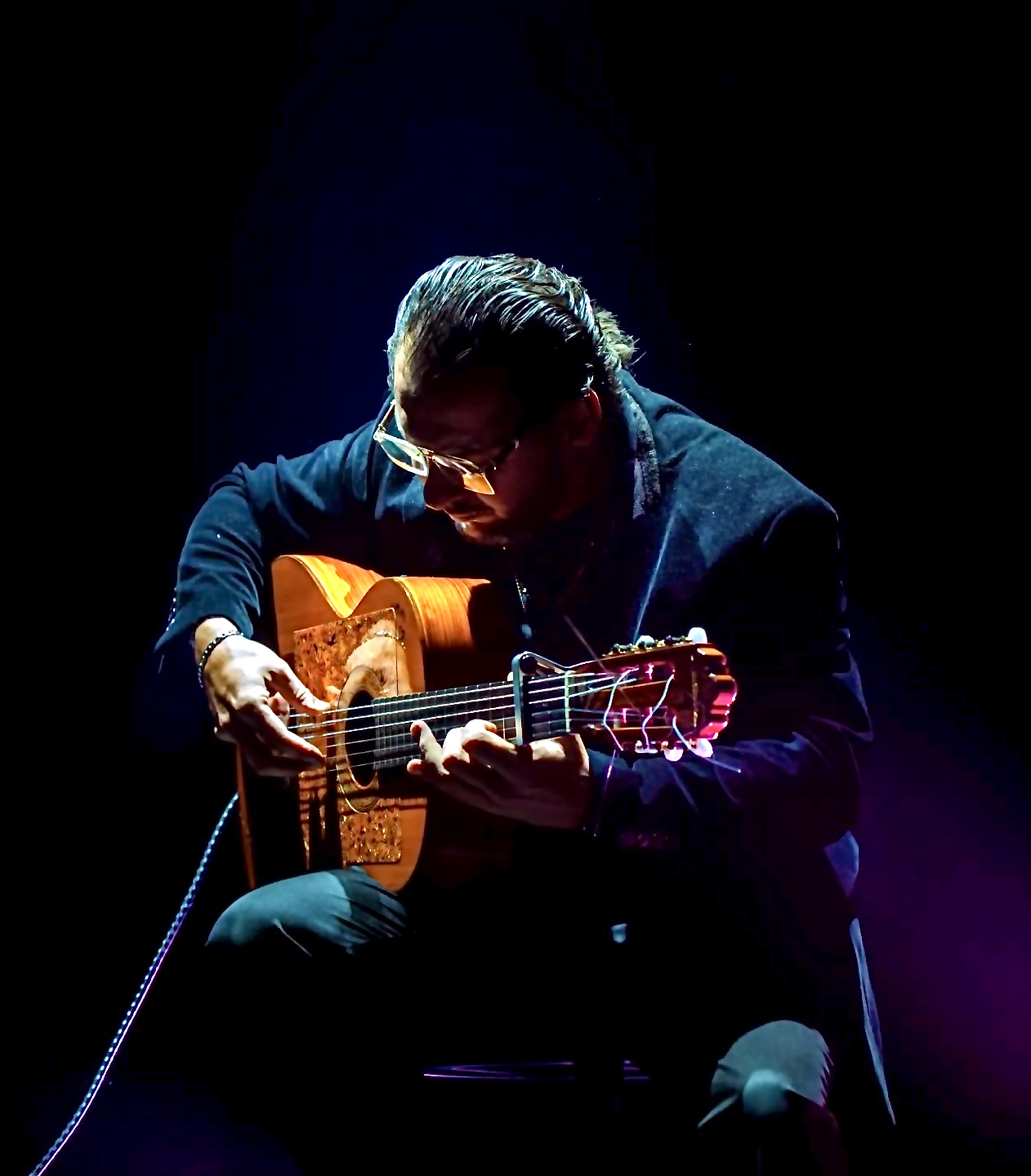
Man performing flamenco-style guitar

Spanish music may refer to:

- Music of Spain, music of the Spanish people in Spain
- Latin music, though note that not all Latin music are in Spanish

Spanish music may also refer to the music of Spanish-speaking countries:

- Music of Argentina
- Music of Bolivia
- Music of Chile
- Music of Costa Rica
- Music of Cuba
- Music of Colombia
- Music of the Dominican Republic
- Music of Ecuador
- Music of El Salvador
- Music of Equatorial Guinea
- Music of Guatemala
- Music of Honduras
- Music of Mexico
- Music of Nicaragua
- Music of Panama
- Music of Paraguay
- Music of Peru
- Music of Puerto Rico
- Music of Venezuela
- Music of Uruguay
