= A Storm Was Coming =

2020 Spanish film

- Film poster
- Directed by: Javier Fernández Vázquez
- Written by: Javier Fernández Vázquez
- Produced by: Javier Fernández Vázquez
- Starring: Paciencia Tobilleri Bepe; Ricardo Bulá Bitema; Nieves Posa Bohome; Justo Bolekia Boleká; José Carlos Domínguez
- Cinematography: Lati Maraña
- Edited by: Javier Fernández Vázquez
- Release dates: February 2020 (Berlinale); 18 December 2020 (Spain)
- Running time: 87 minutes
- Country: Spain
- Languages: Spanish, Bubi

A Storm Was Coming (Spanish: Anunciaron tormenta) is a 2020 Spanish documentary film directed and produced by Javier Fernández Vázquez. The documentary focuses on Ësáasi Eweera, one of the last kings of the Bubi people in the island of Bioko, Equatorial Guinea, who was captured by authorities in 1904 and died under strange circumstances.

== Synopsis ==
Ësáasi Eweera, one of the last kings of the Bubi people in the island of Bioko, Equatorial Guinea, opposed to the Spanish colonial authorities, is captured in 1904 by them and died under strange circumstances. The film reopens the case a century later. The official reports of the Spanish are read out by actors and contrasted with interviews with the Bubi.

== Production ==
Anunciaron tormenta was produced with the assistance of the City Council of Madrid and with the support of both ECAM and Progressio.

== Reception ==
The film premiered at the 70th Berlin International Film Festival and at the Pontevedra International Film Festival, where it was the winner of the Latexos section. The film was also nominated to eight Goya Awards categories. Fernando Bernal of 20 Minutos rated with 4.5 out of 5 stars.
