= Republic of Equatorial Guinea (1968–1979) =

Equatorial Guinea under Francisco Macías Nguema

Republic of Equatorial Guinea República de Guinea Ecuatorial (Spanish)
- 1968–1979
- Flag (1978–1979) Coat of arms
- Motto: Unidad, Paz, Justicia (Spanish) "Unity, Peace, Justice" (1968–1978) No hay otro Dios que Macías Nguema (Spanish) "There is no other God than Macías Nguema" (1978–1979)
- Anthem: Caminemos pisando las sendas de nuestra inmensa felicidad (Spanish); Let Us Tread the Path of Our Immense Happiness
- Capital: Malabo
- Official languages: Spanish
- Government: Federal presidential republic under an authoritarian dictatorship (until 1973) Unitary one-party presidential republic under a totalitarian dictatorship (from 1973)
- President
  - 1968–1979: Francisco Macías Nguema
- History
  - Independence: 12 October 1968
  - 1968 Constitution: 12 October 1968
  - 1973 Constitution: 29 July 1973
  - 1979 Coup: 3 August 1979
  - Fighting between Macías' loyalist and Obiang's rebel forces: 3 – c. 18 August 1979
  - Capture of Francisco Macías Nguema: 18 August 1979
- Currency: Equatorial Guinean peseta Equatorial Guinean ekwele
- ISO 3166 code: GQ
Preceded by	Succeeded by
Spanish Guinea	Equatorial Guinea
- Today part of: Equatorial Guinea

Equatorial Guinea gained independence from Spain on 12 October 1968, with Francisco Macías Nguema becoming the country's first president. His rule, also known as Macíasist Equatorial Guinea, which lasted until 3 August 1979, was marked by increasing totalitarianism, extreme centralization of power, and widespread human rights abuses.

== History ==
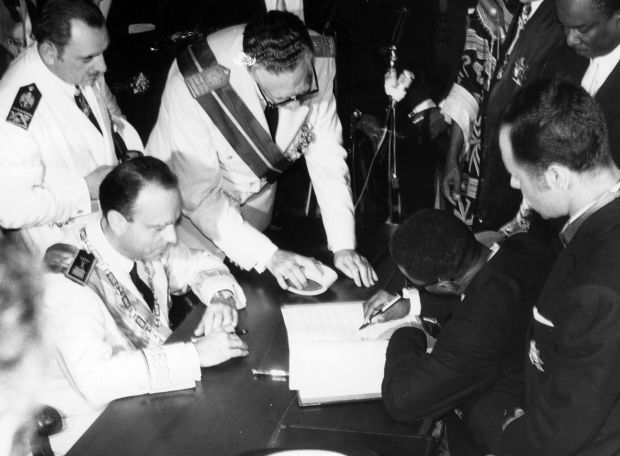
Signing of the independence of Equatorial Guinea by the then Spanish minister Manuel Fraga together with the new Equatorial Guinean president Macías Nguema on October 12, 1968.

In March 1968, under pressure from Equatoguinean nationalists and the United Nations, Spain announced that it would grant independence to Equatorial Guinea. A constitutional convention produced an electoral law and draft constitution. In the presence of a UN observer team, a referendum was held on August 11, 1968, and 63% of the electorate voted in favour of the constitution, which provided for a government with a General Assembly and a Supreme Court with judges appointed by the president.

In September 1968, Francisco Macías Nguema was elected first president of Equatorial Guinea, and independence was granted in October.

At independence, Equatorial Guinea had one of the highest per capita incomes in Africa, although it was also very unevenly distributed as most of the money was in the hands of colonial and elite planters. In its final years of rule the Spanish colonial government achieved a relatively high literacy rate and developed a good network of health care facilities. However, at the time of independence, the number of African doctors and lawyers was in the single digits.

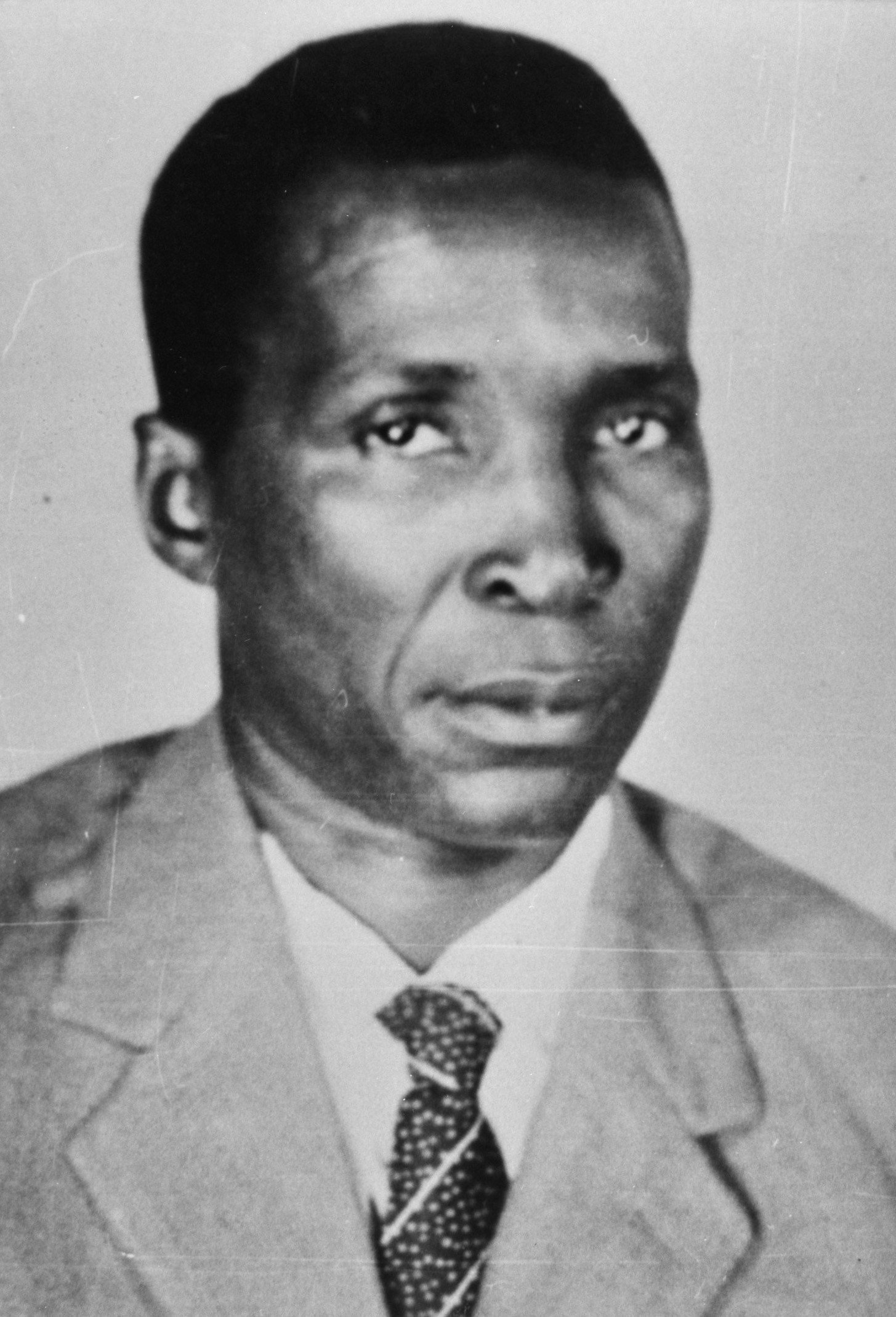
Francisco Macías Nguema, first president of Equatorial Guinea in 1968 and became a dictator until he was overthrown in a coup d'état in 1979.

In July 1970, Macias turned Equatorial Guinea into a single-party state with the United National Workers' Party (PUNT) as the only legal party, and by May 1971, key portions of the constitution were abrogated. In 1972 Macias took complete control of the government and assumed the title of President for Life. The Macias regime was characterized by human rights abuses, totalitarianism and the abandonment of all government functions except internal security, which was accomplished by terror; this led to the death or exile of up to one-third of the country's population. Due to pilferage, ignorance, and neglect, the country's infrastructure—electricity, water, road, transportation, and health—fell into ruin. The private and public sectors of the economy were devastated. Nigerian contract labourers on Bioko, estimated to have been 60,000, left en masse in early 1976. The economy collapsed, and skilled citizens and foreigners left.

He would launch a campaign aimed at Africanization changing Spanish names into African tribal names, while also persecuting non-Fang ethnic groups. In foreign policy, he quickly turned against Spain and allied himself with the Eastern Bloc, receiving support from the Soviet Union, Cuba and North Korea, and to a lesser extent, France and its local allies such as Cameroonian President Ahmadou Ahidjo and Gabonese President Omar Bongo, although relations with Cameroon and Gabon collapsed by 1976. Due to his dictatorship's severe human rights abuses and economic mismanagement, tens of thousands of people fled the country to avoid persecution. This led to Equatorial Guinea being internationally nicknamed the "Dachau of Africa". His rule also led to significant brain drain, as intellectuals and educated classes were particular targets for his persecution.

Religion was repressed, and education ceased. All schools were ordered closed in 1975, and the country's churches were also closed in 1978. Nguema introduced a campaign of 'authenticity', replacing colonial names with native ones: the capital Santa Isabel became Malabo, the main island of Fernando Po was renamed Masie Nguema Biyogo after himself, and Annobón became Pagalu. As part of the same process, Nguema also ordered the entire population to drop their European names and adopt African ones. His own name underwent several transformations, so that by the end of his rule he was known as Masie Nguema Biyogo Ñegue Ndong. Much of the population residing on the island of Bioko, consisting of Nigerian labourers and traders, were forced to evacuate.

== Fall of Macias ==
In August 1979 Macias' nephew from Mongomo and former director of the infamous Black Beach prison, Teodoro Obiang Nguema Mbasogo, led a successful coup d'état; Macias was captured attempting to escape to Cameroon on August 18. He was sentenced to death for the crime of genocide against the Bubi people and other crimes committed. Macías was executed by firing squad on September 29, 1979. Obiang assumed the presidency in October 1979. The islands were renamed Bioko and Annobón. The new ruler faced the challenge of restoring order in a country that was in shambles—by the end of Macias Nguema's dictatorship, the state coffers were empty and the population had been reduced to only one-third of what it was at independence.

== See also ==
- History of Equatorial Guinea
