= Joaquín Elo Ayeto =

Equatoguinean human rights activist (born 1979)

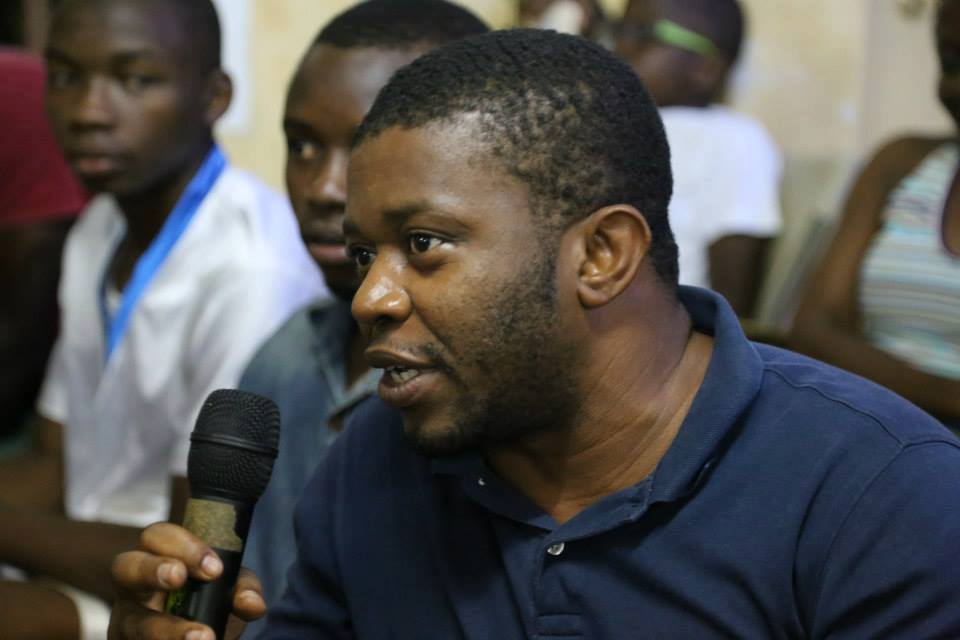
- Born: September 24, 1979 (age 46)
- Occupation: Human rights activist
- Political party: Convergence for Social Democracy

Joaquín "Paysa" Elo Ayeto (born 24 September 1979) is an Equatoguinean human rights activist. A member of the opposition political party Convergence for Social Democracy and the co-founder of the civil society organisation Somos+, he has been arrested and imprisoned on various occasions since 2016.

== Biography ==
Elo Ayeto is a member of Convergence for Social Democracy, the main opposition party in Equatorial Guinea. He served as the party's secretary of mobilisation, propaganda and citizen participation. In addition, Elo Ayeto was a founding member of Somos+, a civil society non-governmental organisation. Somos+ was founded in 2015, originally with the intention of supporting young people who had been arbitrarily detained during the Africa Cup of Nations, which was held in Equatorial Guinea. Somos+ went on to broaden its scope to report on human rights violations in Equatorial Guinea. In 2020, Elo Ayeto attempted to formally register Somos+ with the Ministry of Interior and Local Corporations; however, the attempt was unsuccessful as authorities stated Somos+ required validation from the General Directorate of Human Rights, despite this not being required under Equatoguinean law.

On 29 November 2016, Elo Ayeto was assaulted by two officers from the Armed Forces of Equatorial Guinea after he had posted an article online about an officer refusing to pay a toll. He filed a criminal complaint, but was accused by a judge of giving a "bad image" of Equatorial Guinea and was placed in pre-trial detention at Black Beach, a prison in Malabo, though no charges were identified as the reason for his imprisonment. Elo Ayeto was released from detention at the start of the new judicial year in January 2017 after a month in prison.

On 27 June 2017, Elo Ayeto and several other activists from Somos+ were arrested after taking part in a protest calling for justice for José Vidal Ndoing Micha, a taxi driver who had been allegedly killed by the Armed Forces of Equatorial Guinea. Elo Ayeto was released without charge following a week in detention.

On 25 February 2019, Elo Ayeto was arrested for a third time after being accused of holding information about a planned attempt to assassinate the President of Equatorial Guinea, Teodoro Obiang Nguema Mbasogo. Elo Ayeto was originally interrogated at Central Police Station in Malabo, where he reported that he had been tortured on at least two occasions, including having his hands and feet tied, being suspended from the ceiling, and having his legs and buttocks whipped. Elo Ayeto was transferred to Black Beach, where he was held for almost a year in pre-trial detention; while a hearing was held at the Investigating Court Number 2 in Malabo on 21 November on charges of defamation and threats against the president. Following a meeting between Obiang and members of the Convergence for Social Democracy, Obiang ordered Elo Ayeto's release from prison on 14 February 2020. Elo Ayeto was never formally sentenced for his alleged offences.

In December 2022, Elo Ayeto was arrested for organising a human rights conference to commemorate Human Rights Day "without official authorisation".

On 1 August 2024, Elo Ayeto was arrested at his home in Malabo by members of the gendarmerie who had forcibly entered his home. He was accused of carrying out illegal activities through Somos+, which was not legally registered to function in Equatorial Guinea. The arrest occurred several days after Elo Ayeto and other members of Somos+ had visited the French embassy; the embassy had been supportive of Somos+'s investigation of human rights violations that had occurred on Annobón following protests against the impact of mining dynamite explosions on the island; and only hours after Elo Ayeto posted a video online in which he stated he was "tired of being constantly arrested". Somos+ was accused of "operating clandestinely" and "seeking external support" from the French embassy.

On 4 August, Elo Ayeto's lawyer, Ángel Obama Obiang Eseng, was arrested on charges of "representing an illegal organisation"; he was detained for 48 hours before being released. He was subsequently temporarily suspended from the Equatorial Guinea Bar Association, meaning he could no longer legally represent Elo Ayeta in criminal proceedings.

== Response ==
Amnesty International called on Equatoguinean authorities to immediately release Elo Ayeto from pre-trial detention, stating that he had been arbitrarily detained solely due to his human rights activism. It noted that the Constitution of Equatorial Guinea guaranteed rights to freedom of association, expression and peaceful assembly.

EG Justice, an international human rights organisation focused on Equatorial Guinea, called on democracy activists and organisations within the country, as well as the African Commission and the United Nations Human Rights Council to exert pressure on President Obiang and his government to "end all forms of harassment against dissidents" and to ensure due process for detained individuals.

Ambô Legadu, the news agency for Annobón, called on the international community to "strong condemn" Elo Ayeto's arrest and to put pressure on the Obiang government to respect human rights and to release all political prisoners.
