= Anomalías eléctricas =

- Starring: Ramón Esono Ebalé, Desiderio Manresa Bodipo, Rosa Cardus, Salustiana Ayecaba, Exuperancia Bibang
- Release date: 2010
- Running time: 2'
- Country: Equatorial Guinea

Anomalías eléctricas is a 2010 Equatoguinean short animated comedy film.

== Synopsis ==
The main character is studying in his house in Malabo when, suddenly, the power is cut. He looks for a candle, but he falls because it is dark. The light comes back, and he can start to study again, but this does not last long. The power goes off again, and the character tries to fix it, but he has an electrical accident. When the light comes back on, he appears with dreadlocked hair and a few seconds later, the power is cut for the third time.
