= Patrima =

Singer

Patrima is an Equatorial Guinean singer who sings in both Spanish and Fang.

== Biography ==
Patrima is a singer who performs in the musical style machacando, the traditional music of Equatorial Guinea. Her music promotes the cause of African women, denouncing polygamy and traditional values. She performs in Spanish and Fang, the language of the Bantu ethnic group.

Patrima is known for performing at the French Institute in Malabo. She has released two albums.
