= Fabián Nsue =

Equatoguinean lawyer

- Born: Equatorial Guinea
- Occupation: Lawyer
- Known for: Human rights activism

Fabián Nsue Nguema is the most prominent human-rights lawyer in Equatorial Guinea. He is a member of and has served as secretary-general in Equatorial Guinea's only legal opposition party, Unión Popular (UP) which frequently denounces human rights violations. He has defended a number of political prisoners in trials.

== Professional activities ==
Nsue has provided legal assistance in a number of high-profile cases.

== 2004 coup case and disbarment ==
Nsue represented a group of persons who were allegedly involved in an attempted coup in March 2004. “There was no attempted coup d'etat in this country,” one of the defendants said during the November 2004 trial. “I had to tell these people what they wanted. It was the only way to stay alive.” An International Bar Association observer reported that the trial “fell far short of international fair trial standards.” The court ignored the defendant's allegations of torture; the government failed to notify defendants before trial of the charges against them, and denied them legal representation until three days before the trial began. The only evidence presented by the prosecution to support its charges were statements made by the defendants under duress. Nsue's request to visit the eight defendants sentenced in the case was rejected in April 2005 by the Supreme Court.

In 2005, he and a colleague at his law firm were disbarred for a year by the Bar Association of Equatorial Guinea, which charged them with unspecified acts of misconduct. This came in the wake of Nsue's defense of the accused coup plotters in March 2004. The Bar Association did not give Nsue prior notice of the charges against him or given an opportunity to defend himself against any charges. The International Bar Association called the disbarment “purely political” and described the Bar Association's decision as having “reportedly [been] made in conjunction with the Government.” IBA Executive Director Mark Ellis said that the disbarment “and the manner in which this has been handled by the Bar Association in Equatorial Guinea is very worrying. This method of intimidation means that lawyers will be reluctant to take on politically sensitive cases for fear of being associated with their client. The administration of justice in Equatorial Guinea continues to be of grave concern to the IBA.”

== Other professional activities ==
Nsue represented Simon Mann, a British citizen who was jailed in 2008 for plotting to overthrow the president. According to the Human Rights Foundation, Nsue “defended Weja Chicambo, a former prisoner of conscience and the founder of an 'illegal' opposition party.”

He was also the defense lawyer for four UP members who were accused of having assaulted the Presidential Palace in February 2009, even though, according to the Human Rights Foundation, “the four men were in exile in Benin when the attack occurred.” (The four men “were later tracked down, brought back to Equatorial Guinea, tortured, and executed,” Over the course of his career, he has frequently been harassed by the government of Equatorial Guinea.

Nsue complained in May 2011 that he had been under investigation by unknown persons in recent weeks and that a total of four memory sticks had been taken from his office on two different occasions.

== Imprisonment in 2002 ==
In April 2002, according to Amnesty International, he “was arrested as he was about to defend a group of political prisoners who were subsequently adopted as prisoners of conscience by Amnesty International. In July 2002, he was tried for defamation of President Obiang and sentenced to one year in prison.” He was confined for five months in Black Beach prison in Malabo, described by Human Rights Foundation as “a place with a reputation so grim that it earned Nsue's home country of Equatorial Guinea the nickname of 'the Auschwitz of Africa' back in the 1970s.” In prison, Nsue was tortured. Amnesty International designated him as a prisoner of conscience.

== Imprisonment in 2012 ==
Nsue's client Augustín Esono Ngoso was arrested on or around October 16, 2012, allegedly because of his supposed ties to the non-governmental organisation Transparency International France, which had been investigating corruption on the part of Obiang and his son. Nsue immediately began trying to secure permission to see Esono. On October 22, police superintendent Liborio Mba told Nsue he could visit Esono at Black Beach. Around midday, Nsue went to the prison, but was not granted immediate access to his client. During the day he had phone contact with his wife, but he failed to return home that night, and the next day his wife contacted the investigative court and went to the prison, where she was turned away and told that her husband was not there, even though his car was still in the parking lot.

“Fabian Nsue’s disappearance while visiting a prison is of grave concern,” said Daniel Bekele, Africa director at Human Rights Watch. “The government needs to urgently investigate the situation, determine whether he is being held in secret detention, contrary to national and international law, and publicly clarify his whereabouts.”

“Nsue’s career as a lawyer has been dedicated to fighting injustice and upholding the law, even in the face of harsh government repression,” said Tutu Alicante, executive director of EG Justice, a US-based group that advocates for human rights in Equatorial Guinea. “The authorities must fully respect his rights and clarify his whereabouts without delay.”

In fact he had been detained at the prison and held incomunicado there with no bed or bathroom, but was not tortured. On October 24, his wife was informed of this but was not allowed to see him. While in Black Beach prison, Nsue was told that Esono had implicated him in “an attempt to destabilise the country.” He was not given additional details about this claim.

On October 25, Nsue and other detainees were moved to the Comisaria Central (Central Police Station) in Malabo, where he was held in a large cell with many other detainees and was free to move about. His wife was permitted to visit him daily and to take him food.

Nsue endured nine days of solitary confinement in a dark cell. He and three other detainees were released without charge on the evening of October 30. He was released in the presence of the United States Ambassador, who had lobbied for his freedom. Esono Nsogo remained imprisoned.

== Comments about human rights in Equatorial Guinea ==
Nsue told the Voice of America in 2008 that Equatorial Guinea is “a criminal state run mostly by greedy illiterates” and that “even though there has been international attention on the problem of human rights in Equatorial Guinea, he thinks the situation is getting worse.” Describing “weekly arbitrary arrests, indefinite detentions without trial, and dozens of political prisoners,” he complained that judges “do not have proper training or independence” and that “authorities use alleged coup attempts to crack down on basic freedoms even more.”
