= Progressive Democratic Alliance (Equatorial Guinea) =

Political party in Equatorial Guinea

Progressive Democratic Alliance Alianza Democrática Progresista
- President: Francisco Mba Olo Bahamonde

The Progressive Democratic Alliance (Spanish: Alianza Democrática Progresista; ADP) is a political party in Equatorial Guinea.

ADP, along with the other 10 political parties that had been legalized in 1993, participated in the National Pact (El Pacto Nacional), the first meeting of the government of President Teodoro Obiang Nguema Mbasogo with opposition parties. ADP participated in subsequent National Pact-style meetings between the government and opposition parties in 1997, 2001, and 2003.

In 2000, the ADP joined with five other opposition parties to form an alliance called the Front of the Democratic Opposition (Spanish: Frente de la Oposición Democrática). The ADP's most prominent figure at that time was Victorino Bolekia, the mayor of Malabo. Bolekia is a well-known opponent of the government, and he has been detained by the government during elections.
