= National Anthem of Equatorial Guinea =

Himno Nacional de Guinea Ecuatorial
English: National Anthem of Equatorial Guinea
- National anthem of Equatorial Guinea
- Lyrics: Atanasio Ndongo Miyone
- Music: Ramiro Sánchez López
- Adopted: 1968

Audio sample
- U.S. Navy Band instrumental version: file; help

Himno Nacional de Guinea Ecuatorial (English: National Anthem of Equatorial Guinea), also known by its incipit "Caminemos pisando las sendas de nuestra inmensa felicidad" (Spanish pronunciation: [kamiˈnemos piˈsando la ˈsenda ðe ˈnwestɾa jmˈmensa feliθiˈðað]; "Let Us Walk Treading the Paths of Our Immense Happiness"), sometimes written with la senda ("the Path"), is the national anthem of Equatorial Guinea.

== History ==
The anthem was written by musician and writer Atanasio Ndongo Miyone. The lyrics were influenced by the end of Equatorial Guinea's colonisation, with anti-colonisation being a main theme. The music was composed by Ramiro Sánchez López, who was a Spanish lieutenant and the deputy director of music at the army headquarters located in Madrid. He received a prize of 25,000 pesetas for composing the music.

The anthem was first performed on Equatorial Guinea's independence day, 12 October 1968.

On 18 June 2021, the General Director of Sports of Equatorial Guinea, Rodolfo Bodipo, announced that it was now mandatory to play the national anthem before all sporting events. The decision was made to "encourage and promote national pride and patriotic spirit from the base", referring to the youth.

== Lyrics ==
=== Spanish original ===
Spanish lyrics

Caminemos pisando las sendas (Note: Las sendas ("the paths") is sometimes written la senda ("the path").)
De nuestra inmensa felicidad.
En fraternidad, sin separación,
¡Cantemos Libertad!

Tras dos siglos de estar sometidos
Bajo la dominación colonial, (Note: Por ("by") is sometimes written bajo ("under").)
En fraterna unión, sin discriminar,
¡Cantemos Libertad!

Coro:
¡Gritemos viva, libre Guinea,
Y defendamos nuestra Libertad.
Cantemos siempre, libre Guinea,
Y conservemos siempre la unidad.

¡Gritemos viva, libre Guinea,
Y defendamos nuestra Libertad.
Cantemos siempre, libre Guinea,
𝄆 Y conservemos, y conservemos
La independencia nacional. 𝄇

IPA transcription (Note: See Help:IPA/Spanish and Spanish phonology.)

[kamiˈnemos piˈsando la ˈsenda]
[de ˈnwestɾa jmˈmensa feliθiˈðað]
[eɱ fɾateɾniˈðað ˈsin sepaɾaˈθjon]
[kanˈtemos liβeɾˈtað]

[ˈtɾas ˈðos ˈsiɣlos ðe esˈtaɾ someˈtiðos]
[ˈbaxo la ðominaˈθjoŋ koloˈnjal]
[eɱ fɾaˈteɾna wˈnjon ˈsin diskɾimiˈnaɾ]
[kanˈtemos liβeɾˈtað]

[ˈkoɾo]
[ɡɾiˈtemos ˈβiβa ˈliβɾe ɣiˈnea]
[i ðefenˈdamos ˈnwestɾa liβeɾˈtað]
[kanˈtemos ˈsjempɾe ˈliβɾe ɣiˈnea]
[i konseɾˈβemos ˈsjempɾe la wniˈðað]

[ɡɾiˈtemos ˈβiβa ˈliβɾe ɣiˈnea]
[i ðefenˈdamos ˈnwestɾa liβeɾˈtað]
[kanˈtemos ˈsjempɾe ˈliβɾe ɣiˈnea]
𝄆 [i konseɾˈβemos i konseɾˈβemos]
[la jndepenˈdenθja naθjoˈnal] 𝄇

=== Translations ===
Portuguese lyrics

Caminhemos trilhando as estradas
Da nossa imensa felicidade,
Em fraternidade, sem separação,
Cantemos Liberdade!

Após dois séculos sendo submetidos
À dominação colonial,
Em fraterna união, sem discriminação,
Cantemos Liberdade!

Refrão:
Gritemos viva, livre Guiné,
E defendamos nossa Liberdade
Cantemos sempre, livre Guiné,
E conservemos sempre a unidade.

Gritemos viva, livre Guiné,
E defendamos nossa Liberdade
Cantemos sempre, livre Guiné,
𝄆 E conservemos, e conservemos,
A independência nacional. 𝄇

French lyrics

Marchons en parcourant les chemins
De notre immense bonheur,
Dans la fraternité, sans séparation,
Chantons la Liberté!

Après deux siècles d'être soumis
Par la domination coloniale,
Dans l'union fraternelle, sans discrimination,
Chantons la Liberté!

Refrain :
Crions vive, la Guinée libre,
Et défendons notre Liberté
Chantons toujours, la Guinée libre,
Et conservons toujours l'unité.

Crions vive, la Guinée libre,
Et défendons notre Liberté
Chantons toujours, la Guinée libre,
𝄆 Et conservons, et conservons,
L'indépendance nationale. 𝄇

English translation

Let us walk treading the paths
Of our immense happiness.
In brotherhood, without separation,
Let us sing Freedom!

After two centuries of being subjected
By colonial domination,
In fraternal union, without discrimination,
Let's sing Freedom!

Chorus:
Let us shout long live free Guinea!,
and let us defend our Freedom.
Let us always sing free Guinea,
And let us always preserve the unity.

Let us shout long live free Guinea!,
and let us defend our Freedom.
Let us always sing free Guinea,
𝄆 And let us always preserve
National independence. 𝄇

== See also ==
- Atanasio Ndongo Miyone
- Music of Equatorial Guinea
