= Francisco Malabo Beosá =

African monarch (1896-2001)

Francisco Malabo Beosá or King Malabo II (23 June 1896 – November 2001), was an African monarch, born on the island of Fernando Po in Spanish Guinea (now Bioko, Equatorial Guinea), was the son of former Bubi king Malabo Lopelo Melaka (Malabo I) and the last legitimate successor of the Bubi Kingdom.

== Biography ==
King Malabo II was considered the spiritual father of the Bubi people, leading circle of elder advisers whose animist rites focused on the cult of Morim - the supreme being and creator of the universe. In 1973, Francisco Macías Nguema in his policy of Africanizing the names of geographic landmarks in Equatorial Guinea, changed the name of Santa Isabel, the capital of Equatorial Guinea to Malabo in honor of his father King Malabo.

King Malabo II died at the age of 105 in the village of Moka, his hometown, located in the southern part of Bioko Island. He was one of the longest-lived members of any royal family. He left a large family of nine children, 62 grandchildren, 84 great-grandchildren, and 17 great-great-grandchildren.

== Honours ==
King Malabo II celebrated his centenary in 1996 and died in 2001 at the age of 105. The government of Equatorial Guinea, represented by the governor of Bioko Sur Province, Deogracias Olom Miguel Abia, paid a nationally televised tribute to Malabo II during his funeral in Moka.
