= Capital punishment in Equatorial Guinea =

Capital punishment, or death penalty, is no longer a legal punishment in Equatorial Guinea, except for some military offenses. Capital punishment was permitted until 2022. The last execution took place in 2014.

Equatorial Guinea is required to have a moratorium on executions in order to become a full member of the Community of Portuguese Language Countries.

There is currently no one on death row in Equatorial Guinea, as of 24 May 2022. There were no death sentences handed down in the country in 2021.

== Abolition ==
On 19 September 2022, President Teodoro Obiang Nguema Mbasogo signed a new penal code that abolished the death penalty, according to a tweet sent by Vice President Teodoro Nguema Obiang Mangue.
