= Atanasio Ndongo Miyone =

Equatoguinean writer of the national anthem (1928–1969)

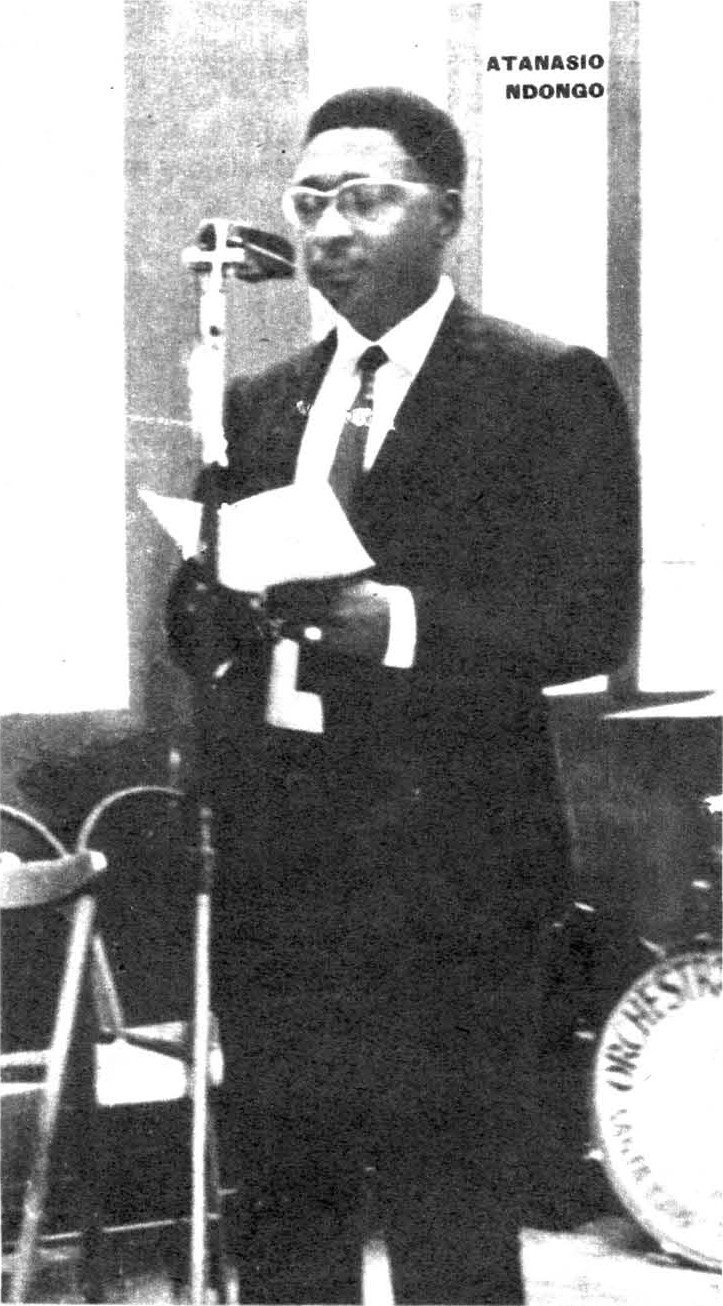
- Ndongo in 1968

1st Minister of Foreign Affairs and International Cooperation of Equatorial Guinea
- In office October 12, 1968 – March 5, 1969
- President: Francisco Macías Nguema
- Preceded by: Office established
- Succeeded by: Francisco Macías Nguema

Personal details
- Born: March 19, 1928 Mbini, Río Muni, Spanish Guinea
- Died: March 26, 1969 (aged 41) Bata, Equatorial Guinea
- Party: National Liberation Movement of Equatorial Guinea

Atanasio Ndongo Miyone (March 19, 1928 – March 26, 1969) was an Equatoguinean musician, writer, and Fang political figure. He wrote the lyrics to Equatorial Guinea's national anthem. He died in disputed circumstances in 1969 following a failed coup d'état to depose president Francisco Macías Nguema.

== Political career ==
In the period leading up to Equatorial Guinea's independence from Spain, Ndongo led one of the country's major political parties, the National Liberation Movement of Equatorial Guinea (MONALIGE). He established the party in 1959 while living in Gabon; as MONALIGE was an African nationalist party that campaigned for Equatoguinean independence, he led the party from abroad due to Spanish suppression of independence movements at the time. After Spain granted Equatorial Guinea independence in 1968, he was defeated by Macías in the country's first elections; though he became the nation's foreign minister, he remained discontent with the outcome.

On March 5, 1969, Ndongo was framed by Macías as involved in a fake coup against him. According to the official account, Ndongo attempted to commit suicide by jumping out of a window at the Presidential Palace, but it is widely suspected that he was forcibly defenestrated. Denied medical attention, he died on March 26 of injuries sustained in the fall.

== Equatorial Guinea's national anthem ==
Ndongo wrote the lyrics for Equatorial Guinea's national anthem, "Caminemos pisando las sendas de nuestra inmensa felicidad" ("Let Us Tread the Path of our Immense Happiness"), in 1968. The music was composed by Ramiro Sanchez Lopes, who was a Spanish lieutenant and the deputy director of music at the army headquarters located in Madrid; he received 25,000 ₧ for his efforts. Ndongo's anthem was first played on October 12, 1968, Equatorial Guinea's independence day, and was well-received by his countrymen.

The lyrics of the anthem were influenced by the end of Equatorial Guinea's colonization, with de-colonization being a main theme.

== See also ==
- National Anthem of Equatorial Guinea#Spanish original
- Music of Equatorial Guinea
- Equatoguinean literature in Spanish

Political offices
New title	Minister of Foreign Affairs and International Cooperation of Equatorial Guinea; 1968–1969	Succeeded by Francisco Macías Nguema
