= Equatorial Guinea Constitution of 1973 =

Legal fundamental law of Equatorial guinea in 1973

Constitution of Equatorial Guinea of 1973
- Coat of Arms from 1973 to 1979

Overview
- Jurisdiction: Republic of Equatorial Guinea
- Ratified: 29 July 1973
- Date effective: 29 July 1973
- System: One-party state
- Repealed: 18 August 1979

The Constitution of Equatorial Guinea of 1973 was the country's second constitution. It was submitted, without the participation of international observers, to a popular referendum on July 29, 1973, obtaining 99% of votes in favor. and subsequently published in the Official Gazette in August of the same year, under the government of Francisco Macías.

== Background ==
At the request of President Macías, an expert advisor in constitutional law sent by the Cuban government participated in its elaboration, and was integrated into the Equatoguinean Commission in charge of drafting the constitutional text. Although Antonio García-Trevijano is attributed a prominent role in the drafting of the text, in 1979 the former Minister of the Interior, Angel Másié Ntutumu, denied such intervention. The Constitution was drafted during a congress of the United National Workers' Party (PUNT).

== Content ==
The new constitution granted absolute powers to the president, and annulled the provincial administrations; the island of Fernando Poo (present-day Bioko Island) was renamed "Island of Macias Nguema Biyogo".

According to the text, the country was constituted as a Democratic and Popular Republic, and among the objectives of the State was to "consolidate the ideological principles proclaimed by the United National Workers' Party". The rights of freedom of speech and thought were guaranteed, but the press and other means of communication remained under the direct control of the State. Although it is established that political posts are elected by universal suffrage every five years, "in recognition of the high virtues and exalted achievements for the benefit of the Fatherland, the Honorable and Great Comrade Francisco Macías is proclaimed President for Life", in line with what was already established by Constitutional Law in July 1972. Likewise, according to Article 56 ("The National People's Assembly shall be composed of sixty deputies proposed by the Party") and Article 60 ("The Party has the power to revoke the mandate of its deputies, at any time, for deviation from the political line of the Party or other serious cause") and other similar articles, the Single United National Workers' Party came to have all the power.

It was in force until the August 1979 coup d'état carried out by Teodoro Obiang, the so-called Freedom Coup that established the Supreme Military Council of Equatorial Guinea, although a new Constitution was not approved until August 1982.

== See also ==
- 1968 Equatorial Guinea constitution
- 1982 Equatorial Guinea constitution
- 1991 Equatorial Guinea constitution
