= Malabo Lopelo Melaka =

Bubi king

King Malabo I
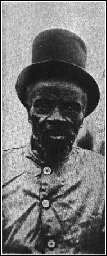
- King Malabo of Bioko in 1930
- Born: c. 1837; Fernando Po
- Died: 1937; Fernando Po, Spanish Guinea
- Occupation: African monarch

Malabo Löpèlo Mëlaka or King Malabo I (c. 1837–1937), born on the island of Fernando Po (then part of Spanish Guinea), was the son of former King Moka (Möókáta) of the Bubi people and served as king from 1904 until his death in 1937, during the Bahítáari Dynasty. One of his three sons, Francisco Malabo Beosá (1896–2001), succeeded him as King Malabo II.

== Early life ==
Prior to his reign, King Malabo I served as the secretary to Sas-Ebuera from 1899 until 1904. When King Esáasi Eweera (also known as King Sás-Ebuera) was arrested by Spanish authorities and detained in 1903 for one year. King Malabo I, along with his brother, Löpèlo Malabo Bioko, lost faith that an anti-colonial front against the reigning Spanish authority would see any success.

== Reign as King ==
Despite not having full political influence, King Malabo I symbolically served as the King of Bioko Island during his reign. His administration conducted bureaucratic gestures such as thanking Francisco Alimama Kashu, a native of Hyderabad, British India for his collaborating with local farms in improving farming techniques by giving him a 10-acre (40,000 m^{2}) plot of land in the village of Moka. Alimama Kashu eventually settled in Moka and married into the Malabo family.

The last anti-colonial uprising took place in 1910 at San Carlos, after the assassination of a European by the name of Leon Rabadan and two Indian policemen. The confrontation resulted in the deaths of fifteen thousand ethnic Bubi. Immediately after the insurrection, the colonial forces pressured King Malabo I to convince Bubi clan leaders to cease further retaliation. The colonial leaders only addressed the most resistant of the local leaders, such as Chief Riokalo.

With the death of King Malabo I in 1937, who died in prison while serving a life sentence for the killing of Spanish colonial authorities on 19 April of the same year, the political influence of the Bubi administration as well as the traditional role of the tribal king dissipated. The Bahítáari Dynasty ended with the death of King Malabo I's son, Francisco (King Malabo II), in 2001 at age 105.

At the end of the 1970s and under the toponymic Africanization policy of the new Equatorial Guinean government, the capital city of Bioko Island, formerly known as the British Port Clarence and the Spanish Santa Isabel, was renamed in honor of King Malabo I.

In the early 1980s, the Rey Malabo National Institute, formerly called Cardinal Cisneros, followed suit renaming their organization in honor of the king.
