= Music of Equatorial Guinea =

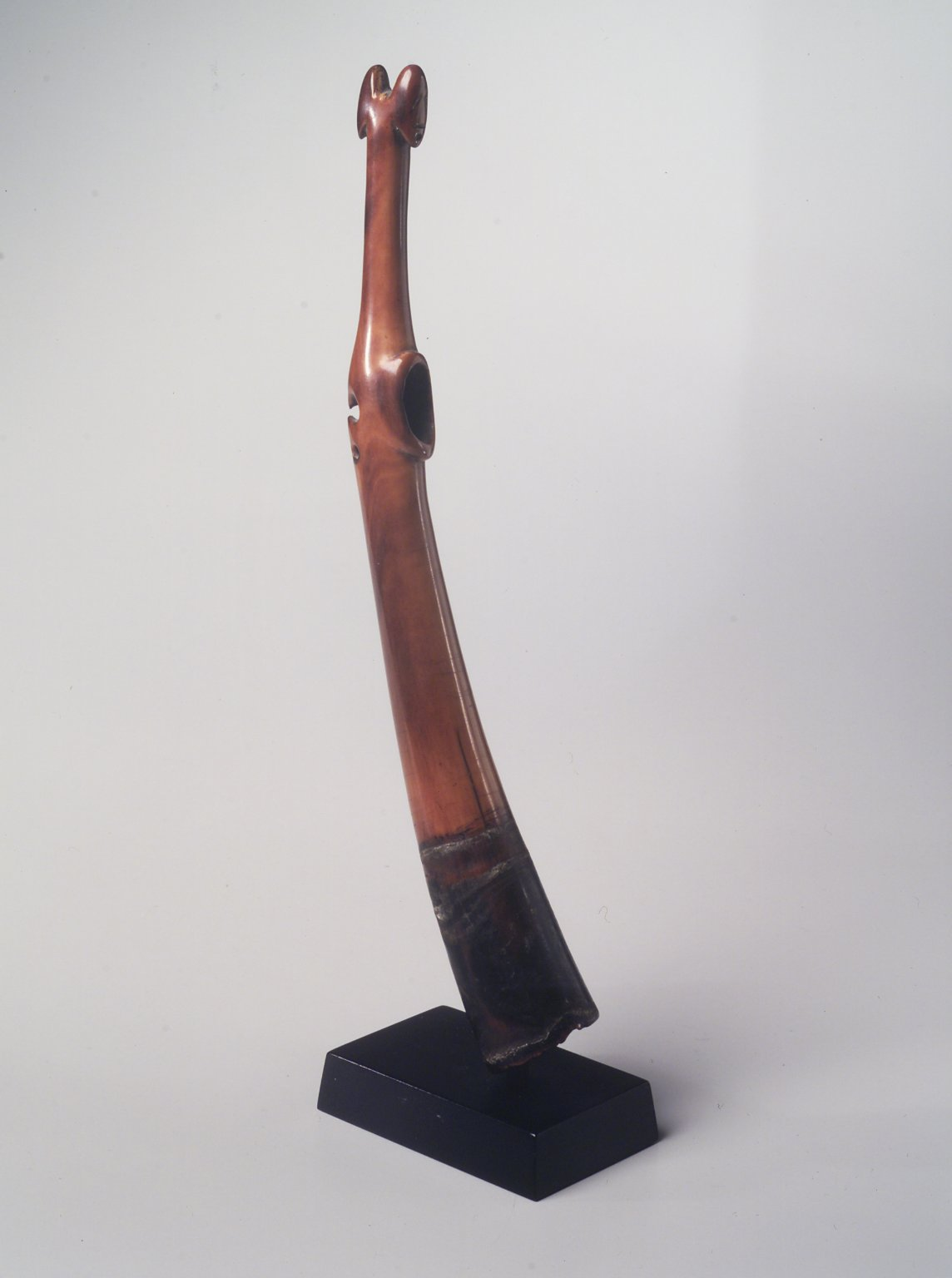
Fang-Beti side-blown trumpet

Equatorial Guinea's culture has been less documented than most African countries, and commercial recordings remain scarce.

== National music ==
The national anthem of Equatorial Guinea was written by Atanasio Ndongo Miyone and adopted in 1968, when the country gained independence from Spain . Equatorial Guinea was carved out of three former Spanish colonies: Río Muni, a strip of land between Cameroon and Gabon; Bioko, an island near Cameroon; and Annobón, an island in the Atlantic Ocean far from the mainland.

== Traditional music ==
The largest ethnic group are the Fang (85.7% (1994 census) of a total 704,001 (July 2013 est.)), with 6.5% Bubi and smaller populations of Mdowe (3.6%), Annobonese (1.6%) and Bujeba (1.1%), including smaller groups such as the Ndowe, the Bisio and the Combe.

The Fang are known for their mvet, a cross between a zither and a harp. The mvet can have up to fifteen strings. The semi-spherical part of this instrument is made of bamboo and the strings are attached to the center by fibers. Music for the mvet is written in a form of musical notation that can only be learned by initiates of the bebom-mvet society. Music is typically call and response with a chorus and drums alternating. Musicians like Eyi Muan Ndong have helped to popularize folk styles.

A three- or four- person orchestra consisting of some arrangement of sanza, xylophone, drums, zithers and bow harps accompanies the many dances in Equatorial Guinea, such as the balélé and the risque ibanga.

Another popular instrument is the tam-tam, a wooden box covered with animal skin. In its center are bamboo keys installed with complete musical scales. A second type of tam-tam has two different levels of musical keys. Generally, wooden musical instruments are decorated with fauna images and geometric drawings. Drums are covered with animal skins or animal drawings.

== Popular music ==
There is little popular music coming out of Equatorial Guinea. Pan-African styles like soukous and makossa are popular, as are reggae and rock and roll. Acoustic guitar bands based on a Spanish model are the country's best-known indigenous popular tradition, especially national stars Desmali and Dambo de la Costa.

Other musicians from Equatorial Guinea include Patrima, Malabo Strit Band, Luna Loca, Chiquitin, Dambo de la Costa, Ngal Madunga, Lily Afro and Spain-based exiles like Super Momo, Hijas del Sol and Baron Ya Buk-Lu.
