= Human rights in Equatorial Guinea =

Equatorial Guinea is known for human rights abuses. Under the current government it has "limited ability of citizens to change their government; increased reports of murders of civilians by security forces; government-sanctioned kidnappings; systematic torture of prisoners and detainees by security forces; life threatening conditions in prisons and detention facilities; impunity; arbitrary arrest and detention and incommunicado detention; harassment and deportation of foreign residents with limited due process; judicial corruption and lack of due process; restrictions on the right to privacy; restrictions on freedom of speech and of the press; restrictions on the rights of assembly, association, and movement; government corruption; violence and discrimination against women; suspected trafficking in persons; discrimination against ethnic minorities; and restrictions on labor rights."

There were multiple irregularities in the 2009 legislative elections, but they were considered an improvement over the flawed 2002 and 2004 elections. There is a cult of personality in Equatorial Guinea around the leader. In order to improve his and Equatorial Guinea's image, long time autocrat Teodoro Obiang hired Racepoint, a global marketing and public relations firm, for $60,000 a year. Transparency International includes Equatorial Guinea as one of its most 12 corrupt states.

Equatorial Guinea also had the death penalty. In September 2022, this was cancelled by President Teodoro Obiang Nguema Mbasogo and Vice President Teodoro Nguema Obiang Mangue.

== Political prisoners ==
In June 2007 the UN Working Group on Arbitrary Detention visited Equatorial Guinea and reported that political prisoners are sometimes tried by military rather than civilian courts. Nongovernmental sources cited around 100 prisoners jailed for political reasons, with many held at the notorious Black Beach Prison.

According to parliamentary testimony, on October 6, 2007, Salvador Ndong Nguema, a member of the opposition party Convergence for Social Democracy (CPDS), died from torture in custody of security forces. Two members of the security forces were taken in, but released and assigned to other security duties.

On March 12–13, 2009, Saturnino Ncogo Mbomio, a member of banned political party died in police detention at Evinayong, ostensibly in possession of weapons for a coup. He died from a fractured skull, allegedly gotten in a suicide attempt falling from his bunk bed.

In March 2017, the Centre for Development Studies and Initiatives was ordered to suspend its activities, and its vice president Alfredo Okenve Ndoho was fined 10 million XAF and imprisoned for 16 days.

In September 2017, cartoonist Ramón Esono Ebalé was imprisoned at Black Beach in Malabo for creating work critical of the ruling party in Equatorial Guinea. He was released in March 2018.

== Historical situation ==
The chart shows Equatorial Guinea's ratings since 1972 in the Freedom in the World reports, published annually by Freedom House. A rating of 1 is "most free" and 7 is "least free".^{1}

Historical ratings

Year	Political Rights	Civil Liberties	Status	President^{2}
1972	6	6	Not Free	Francisco Macías Nguema
1973	6	6	Not Free	Francisco Macías Nguema
1974	6	6	Not Free	Francisco Macías Nguema
1975	7	7	Not Free	Francisco Macías Nguema
1976	6	7	Not Free	Francisco Macías Nguema
1977	7	7	Not Free	Francisco Macías Nguema
1978	7	6	Not Free	Francisco Macías Nguema
1979	7	6	Not Free	Francisco Macías Nguema
1980	7	6	Not Free	Teodoro Obiang Nguema Mbasogo
1981	7	6	Not Free	Teodoro Obiang Nguema Mbasogo
1982^{3}	7	6	Not Free	Teodoro Obiang Nguema Mbasogo
1983	7	6	Not Free	Teodoro Obiang Nguema Mbasogo
1984	7	6	Not Free	Teodoro Obiang Nguema Mbasogo
1985	7	7	Not Free	Teodoro Obiang Nguema Mbasogo
1986	7	7	Not Free	Teodoro Obiang Nguema Mbasogo
1987	7	7	Not Free	Teodoro Obiang Nguema Mbasogo
1988	7	7	Not Free	Teodoro Obiang Nguema Mbasogo
1989	7	7	Not Free	Teodoro Obiang Nguema Mbasogo
1990	7	7	Not Free	Teodoro Obiang Nguema Mbasogo
1991	7	7	Not Free	Teodoro Obiang Nguema Mbasogo
1992	7	6	Not Free	Teodoro Obiang Nguema Mbasogo
1993	7	7	Not Free	Teodoro Obiang Nguema Mbasogo
1994	7	7	Not Free	Teodoro Obiang Nguema Mbasogo
1995	7	7	Not Free	Teodoro Obiang Nguema Mbasogo
1996	7	7	Not Free	Teodoro Obiang Nguema Mbasogo
1997	7	7	Not Free	Teodoro Obiang Nguema Mbasogo
1998	7	7	Not Free	Teodoro Obiang Nguema Mbasogo
1999	7	7	Not Free	Teodoro Obiang Nguema Mbasogo
2000	7	7	Not Free	Teodoro Obiang Nguema Mbasogo
2001	6	6	Not Free	Teodoro Obiang Nguema Mbasogo
2002	7	6	Not Free	Teodoro Obiang Nguema Mbasogo
2003	7	6	Not Free	Teodoro Obiang Nguema Mbasogo
2004	7	6	Not Free	Teodoro Obiang Nguema Mbasogo
2005	7	6	Not Free	Teodoro Obiang Nguema Mbasogo
2006	7	6	Not Free	Teodoro Obiang Nguema Mbasogo
2007	7	6	Not Free	Teodoro Obiang Nguema Mbasogo
2008	7	7	Not Free	Teodoro Obiang Nguema Mbasogo
2009	7	7	Not Free	Teodoro Obiang Nguema Mbasogo
2010	7	7	Not Free	Teodoro Obiang Nguema Mbasogo
2011	7	7	Not Free	Teodoro Obiang Nguema Mbasogo
2012	7	7	Not Free	Teodoro Obiang Nguema Mbasogo
2013	7	7	Not Free	Teodoro Obiang Nguema Mbasogo
2014	7	7	Not Free	Teodoro Obiang Nguema Mbasogo
2015	7	7	Not Free	Teodoro Obiang Nguema Mbasogo
2016	7	7	Not Free	Teodoro Obiang Nguema Mbasogo
2017	7	7	Not Free	Teodoro Obiang Nguema Mbasogo
2018	7	7	Not Free	Teodoro Obiang Nguema Mbasogo
2019	7	7	Not Free	Teodoro Obiang Nguema Mbasogo
2020	7	7	Not Free	Teodoro Obiang Nguema Mbasogo
2021	7	7	Not Free	Teodoro Obiang Nguema Mbasogo
2022	7	7	Not Free	Teodoro Obiang Nguema Mbasogo
2023	7	7	Not Free	Teodoro Obiang Nguema Mbasogo

== International treaties ==
Equatorial Guinea's stances on international human rights treaties are as follows:

International treaties

Treaty	Organization	Introduced	Signed	Ratified
Convention on the Prevention and Punishment of the Crime of Genocide	United Nations	1948	-	-
International Convention on the Elimination of All Forms of Racial Discrimination	United Nations	1966	-	2002
International Covenant on Economic, Social and Cultural Rights	United Nations	1966	-	1987
International Covenant on Civil and Political Rights	United Nations	1966	-	1987
First Optional Protocol to the International Covenant on Civil and Political Rights	United Nations	1966	-	1987
Convention on the Non-Applicability of Statutory Limitations to War Crimes and Crimes Against Humanity	United Nations	1968	-	-
International Convention on the Suppression and Punishment of the Crime of Apartheid	United Nations	1973	-	-
Convention on the Elimination of All Forms of Discrimination against Women	United Nations	1979	-	1984
Convention against Torture and Other Cruel, Inhuman or Degrading Treatment or Punishment	United Nations	1984	-	2002
Convention on the Rights of the Child	United Nations	1989	-	1992
Second Optional Protocol to the International Covenant on Civil and Political Rights, aiming at the abolition of the death penalty	United Nations	1989	-	-
International Convention on the Protection of the Rights of All Migrant Workers and Members of Their Families	United Nations	1990	-	-
Optional Protocol to the Convention on the Elimination of All Forms of Discrimination against Women	United Nations	1999	-	2009
Optional Protocol to the Convention on the Rights of the Child on the Involvement of Children in Armed Conflict	United Nations	2000	-	-
Optional Protocol to the Convention on the Rights of the Child on the Sale of Children, Child Prostitution and Child Pornography	United Nations	2000	-	2003
Convention on the Rights of Persons with Disabilities	United Nations	2006	-	-
Optional Protocol to the Convention on the Rights of Persons with Disabilities	United Nations	2006	-	-
International Convention for the Protection of All Persons from Enforced Disappearance	United Nations	2006	-	-
Optional Protocol to the International Covenant on Economic, Social and Cultural Rights	United Nations	2008	-	-
Optional Protocol to the Convention on the Rights of the Child on a Communications Procedure	United Nations	2011	-	-

== See also ==
- Human trafficking in Equatorial Guinea
- Internet censorship and surveillance in Equatorial Guinea
- LGBT rights in Equatorial Guinea
- Politics of Equatorial Guinea
- Censorship in Equatorial Guinea

== Notes ==
1. Note that the "Year" signifies the "Year covered". Therefore the information for the year marked 2008 is from the report published in 2009, and so on.
2. As of January 1.
3. The 1982 report covers the year 1981 and the first half of 1982, and the following 1984 report covers the second half of 1982 and the whole of 1983. In the interest of simplicity, these two aberrant "year and a half" reports have been split into three year-long reports through interpolation.
