= 1991 Equatorial Guinean constitutional referendum =

A constitutional referendum was held in Equatorial Guinea on 16 November 1991. The new constitution would replace the one-party state with multi-party politics. It was approved by 98.4% of voters with a 94.3% turnout.

== Results ==
Choice	Votes	%
For		98.4
Against		1.6
Invalid/blank votes		-
Total		100
Source: African Elections Database
