= Miguel Eyegue =

Equatoguinean politician (1933–1979)

2nd Vice President of Equatorial Guinea
- In office 2 March 1974 – November 1976
- President: Francisco Macías Nguema
- Preceded by: Edmundo Bossio
- Succeeded by: Position vacant (Bonifacio Nguema Esono Nchama in 1978)

Personal details
- Born: Miguel Eyegue Ntutumu; May 1933 Micomeseng, Río Muni Province, Spanish Guinea
- Died: September 29, 1979 (aged 46) Black Beach prison, Malabo, Bioko Norte, Equatorial Guinea
- Cause of death: Execution by firing squad
- Party: United National Workers' Party
- Spouse: Marguerita Nauzy
- Relatives: Ángel Masié Ntutumu (brother)

Military service
- Allegiance: Francoist Spain
- Branch/service: Colonial Guard of Spanish Guinea
- Years of service: 1948–1950

Miguel Eyegue Ntutumu (Micomeseng, May 1933 – Malabo, 29 September 1979) was an Equatoguinean politician.

== Biography ==
His brother was Ángel Masié Ntutumu, first minister of the Interior of Francisco Macías Nguema.

In 1941, he was sponsored by Enrique Nvo. In 1947 he entered the Provincial Higher School, without finishing his studies. In 1948 he joined the Colonial Guard of Spanish Guinea, which he left in 1950 to enter the commercial sector.

After the independence of Equatorial Guinea from Francoist Spain, he served since October 1968 as President of the Provincial Council and since July 1971 as civil governor of Río Muni.

During the dictatorship of Macías he served as a prison official, being responsible for the execution of many political prisoners.

After the dismissal of Edmundo Bossio in 1974, Eyegue took office on March 2 of that year as acting Vice President of Equatorial Guinea. He was dismissed, imprisoned and tortured after being implicated in the 1976 coup attempt.

After the 1979 coup d'état led by Teodoro Obiang Nguema Mbasogo, Eyegue was tried alongside Macías and other defendants for crimes committed during the dictatorship. He was sentenced to death and executed by firing squad on 29 September 1979, at the age of 46.

Political offices
Preceded by Edmundo Bossio	Vice President of Equatorial Guinea; 1974–1976	Vacant 1976–1978 Title next held by Bonifacio Nguema Esono Nchama
