= Constitution of Equatorial Guinea =

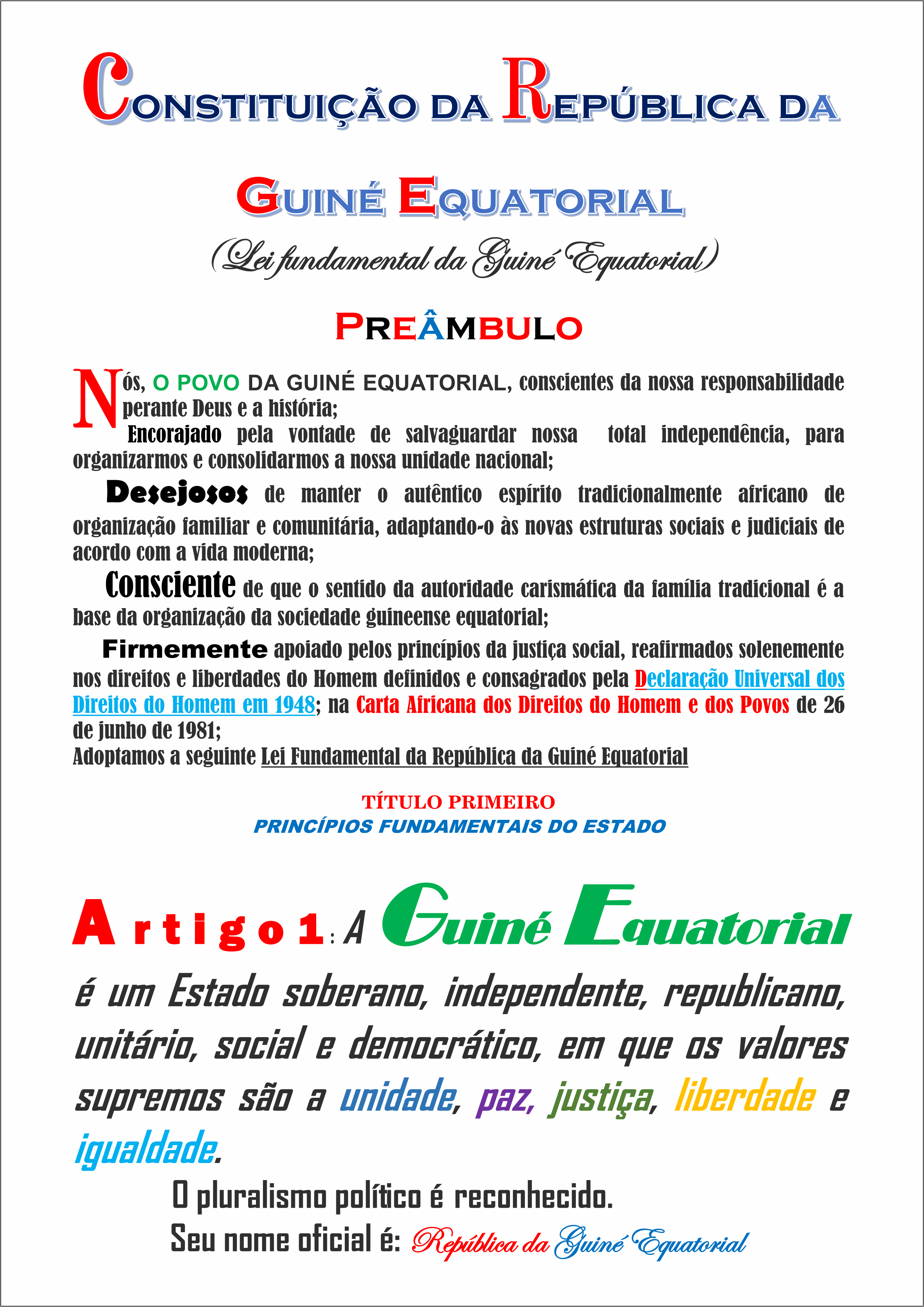
Initial parts, the preamble and Article One, of the Constitution of Equatorial Guinea in Portuguese, one of the official languages of the country.

The Constitution of Equatorial Guinea (Spanish: Ley Fundamental de Guinea Ecuatorial) is the basic document of that country. It was approved in 1991 and amended in 1995. In 2011, a referendum was held on a series of constitutional amendments.

== Historical constitutions ==
- 1968 Equatorial Guinea constitution
- 1973 Equatorial Guinea constitution
- 1982 Equatorial Guinea constitution
