= Black Beach =

Prison in Malabo, Equatorial Guinea

- Interactive map of Black Beach
- Location: Malabo, Equatorial Guinea; 3.759671°N 8.787845°E
- Status: Operational
- Security class: Maximum
- Population: 80 (2007)
- Opened: 1940s

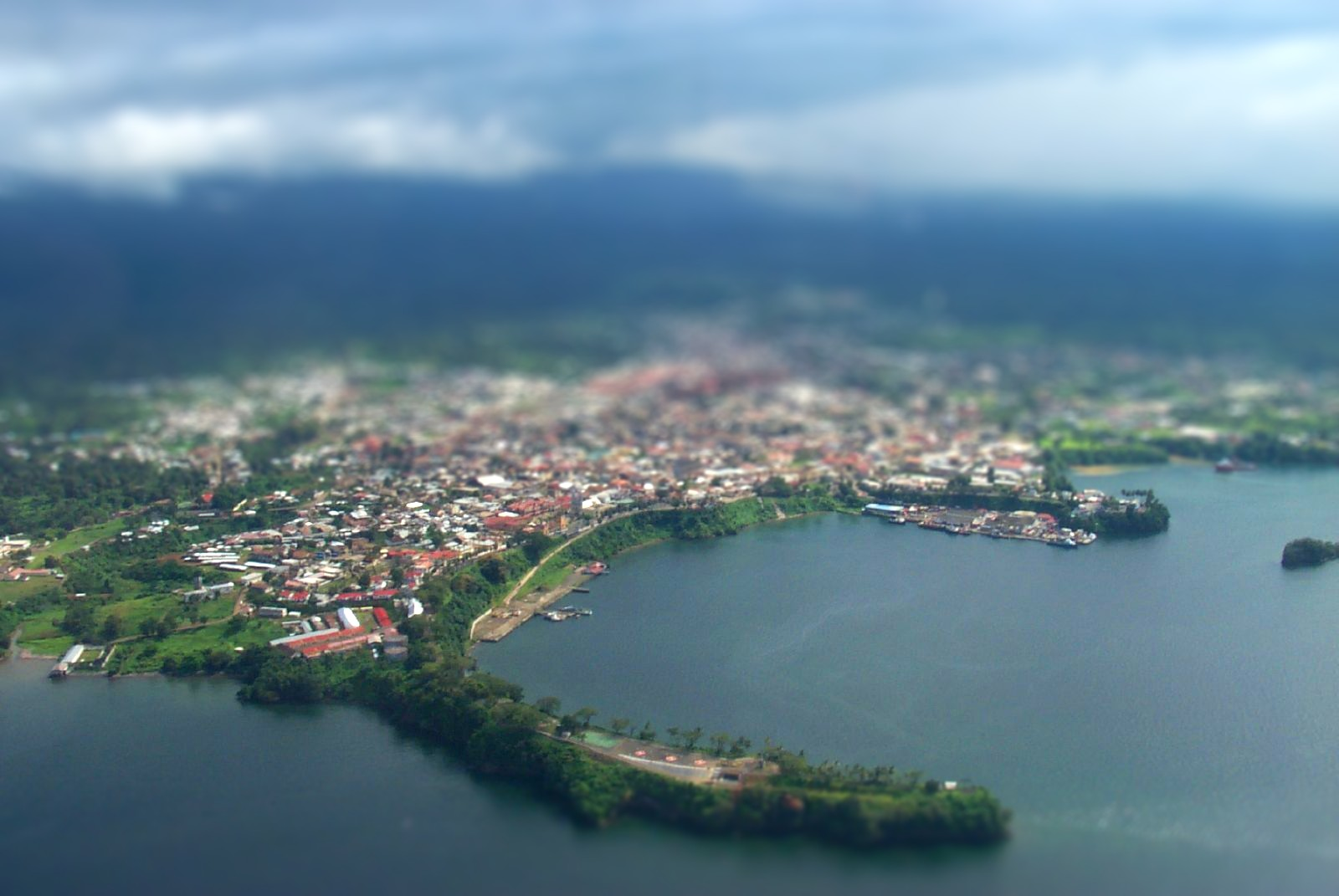
Malabo Harbour, Bioko Island, Equatorial Guinea

Black Beach (Spanish: Playa Negra) is a prison located on the island of Bioko, in the former capital city of Malabo in Equatorial Guinea. It is considered one of Africa's most notorious prisons.

The prison has a reputation of systemic brutality and negligence towards the prisoners. Medical care is often denied to prisoners and food rations are scarce, despite the United Nations' Standard Minimum Rules for the Treatment of Prisoners requiring minimal medical treatment for all prisoners. Torture, beatings, and rape are commonplace in the prison, as well as forced labor. Visitation of inmates is subject to a fee.

The President of Equatorial Guinea, Teodoro Obiang Nguema Mbasogo, is a former Governor of Black Beach Prison.

== History ==
The prison was built in the 1940s during the time of the Spanish colonial rule. At first, common criminals were imprisoned here, but after the independence of the country in 1968 and the establishment of the dictatorship of Francisco Macías Nguema, many political opponents were imprisoned and killed in the prison, including Bonifacio Ondó Edu and Edmundo Bossio. Initially, the methods of execution and torture in the prison consisted of firing squad, garrote, machetes, electrocution, and hanging but they got progressively more brutal over time.

== Notable prisoners ==
Black Beach has held a number of foreign prisoners, mainly mercenaries sentenced for participating in a 2004 coup d'état attempt against the President of Equatorial Guinea, Teodoro Obiang Nguema Mbasogo. These included Nick du Toit and alleged ringleader, Simon Mann, until their presidential pardon on 2 and 3 November 2009 respectively, on humanitarian grounds. Ramón Esono Ebalé spent 6 months in Black Beach until he was released in March 2018 after a police officer admitted to falsely accusing him based on orders from his superiors.

Several people have been jailed there in the over 40 years of dictatorship. Among those imprisoned and tortured are many political leaders such as Rafael Upiñalo (Movimiento), Fabián Nsue (UP), Felipe Ondo Obiang (FDR), Martín Puye of Movement for the Self-Determination of Bioko Island (MAIB) or Plácido Micó of the Social Democratic Convergence for Social Democracy (CPDS).

Teodoro Obiang Nguema Mbasogo's uncle and predecessor, Francisco Macías Nguema, was imprisoned here after he was overthrown in a 1979 coup d'état, and was subsequently executed by firing squad.

Human rights activist Joaquín Elo Ayeto has been detained at Black Beach on multiple occasions since 2016.

- † Francisco Macías
- † Miguel Eyegue
- † Rafael Upiñalo
- † Bonifacio Ondó Edú
- † Edmundo Bossio
- † Martín Puye
- † Saturnino Nkogo
- Cristino Seriche Bioko
- Salvador Elá Nseng
- Agustín Nze Nfumu
- Gaspar Gomán
- Eloy Eló
- Weja Chicampo
- Fabián Nsue
- Felipe Ondo Obiang
- Plácido Micó
- Nick du Toit
- Simon Mann
- Ramón Esono Ebalé
- Cipriano Nguema Mba
- Joaquín Elo Ayeto
- Francisco Ballovera Estrada
