= Ángel Masié Ntutumu =

Equatorial Guinean politician (1930–2020)

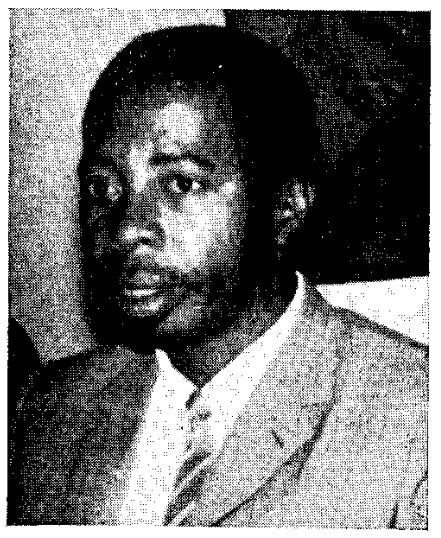
- Angel Masié in 1968

Minister of the Interior of Equatorial Guinea
- In office 12 October 1968 – 1975

Personal details
- Born: 1930
- Died: October 4, 2020 (aged 89–90)
- Children: Ángel Masié Mibuy
- Relatives: Miguel Eyegue (brother)
- Occupation: Politician

Ángel Masié Ntutumu (1930 - 4 October 2020) was an Equatorial Guinean politician.

== Biography ==
Ángel Masié Ntutumu is the brother of Miguel Eyegue, the Vice President of Equatorial Guinea from 1974 to 1976.

A militant of the National Liberation Movement (Movimiento Nacional de Liberación de Guinea Ecuatorial; MONALIGE), Masié Ntutumu was appointed Minister of the Interior by President Francisco Macías Nguema after the Independence of Equatorial Guinea, holding office until 1973. The following year he was appointed Minister of National Security, Deputy Minister of Health, and Presidential Secretary. He is considered to have been responsible for some repressive incidents on Bioko Island in 1974. In 1976 he fell into disgrace and went into exile in Spain.

In 1979, he supported the 1979 coup d'état led by Teodoro Obiang from exile, and returned to the country. In 1981, Masié Ntutumu was involved in a supposed coup attempt with Pedro Ekong Andeme and Andrés Moisés Mba Ada.

He was a member of the Chamber of Deputies for the Democratic Party of Equatorial Guinea (Partido Democrático de Guinea Ecuatorial; PDGE). Later he went over to the opposition and joined the Popular Union party, forming part of its National Political Council. His work resulted in him being arrested in 1991 and 1993.

In 2010 he rejoined the PDGE.

His son is the politician Ángel Masié Mibuy, a current government minister.
