= Ramón Esono Ebalé =

Equatorial Guinean illustrator

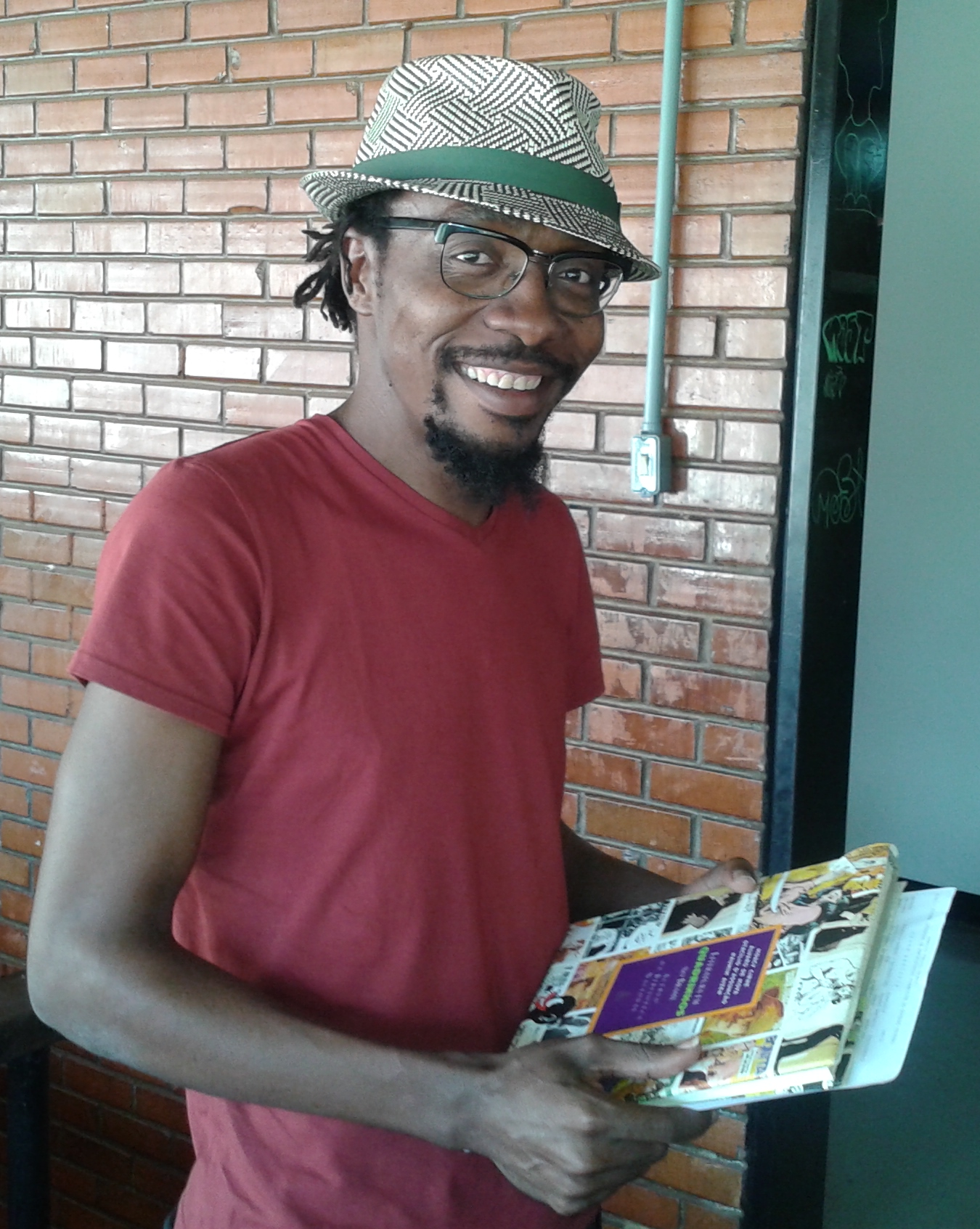
- Ebalé in 2014

Ramón Nse Esono Ebalé (born 22 November 1977) is an Equatorial Guinean illustrator and comics artist. He draws under the pseudonym Jamón y Queso ("Ham and Cheese" in Spanish).

Ebalé was born in Micomeseng in northern Equatorial Guinea. Mostly self-taught, he also received drawing instruction at Centro cultural de España en Malabo. He has received awards such as the Regarde 9 at the Angoulême International Comics Festival and from magazine Africa and Mediterranean at Bologna. On the internet, Ebalé worked for the webzine Las Locuras de Jamón y Queso. He worked on the movie Un día vi 10.000 elefantes and has been exhibited in Paraguay and El Salvador.

In addition to a career as a commercial artist, Ebalé focuses on the deep inequality of Equatorial Guinea and on Teodoro Obiang, dictator since 1979. Ebalé relocated to Paraguay in 2011. Though his crass style alienated many of his collaborators, he continued to work with a small group of dissidents opposing the government and Obiang.

In 2014, with dialogue written by an anonymous collaborator in Malabo, Ebalé drew the graphic novel La pesadilla de Obi (Obi's Nightmare). It was funded by the Non-governmental organization EGJustice. The book is described as "a satirical day-in-the-life that imagines what it would be like for Obiang himself, accustomed to unbridled control of his country’s economy, to wake up as an unemployed, witless husband in one of Malabo’s dreary slums." Lacking opportunities for legal distribution within Equatorial Guinea, the Spanish edition of book was distributed by individuals in secret.

In September 2017, Ebalé was arrested in Malabo and imprisoned at the notorious Black Beach prison. He was released in March 2018 after a police officer admitted to falsely accusing him based on orders from his superiors.

In November 2017, Cartoonists Rights Network, International gave Ebalé its Courage in Editorial Cartooning annual award, to draw attention to his imprisonment.
