= Bubi people =

Bantu ethnic group of Equatorial Guinea

Bubi
- Bubi ethnic flag

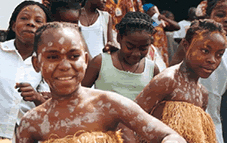
- Bubi children

Total population
- ~100,000 worldwide

Regions with significant populations
- Equatorial Guinea 64,000

Languages
- Bube, Spanish, French, Portuguese

Religion
- Predominantly: Christianity Minority: African traditional religion

Related ethnic groups
- Other Mbam peoples, especially Wovea

The Bubi people (also known as Bobe, Voove, Ewota and Bantu Bubi) are a Bantu ethnic group indigenous to Bioko Island, Equatorial Guinea. Once the majority group in the region, the population experienced a sharp decline due to war and disease during Portuguese expeditions. By the end of Spanish colonial rule in the mid 20th century, and after substantial intermarriage with newly introduced populations, such as Afro-Cubans, Krio people, Portuguese people and Spaniards, the Bubi people, again, experienced a great decline in number. Seventy-five percent were killed during tribal/clan rooted political genocide during a civil war that led to Spanish Guinea's independence from Spain. This, too, sparked mass exodus from their homeland with most of the exiles and refugees immigrating into Spain. The indigenous Bubi of Bioko Island have since co-existed with non-indigenous Krio Fernandinos; and members of the Fang ethnic group, who have immigrated in large numbers from Río Muni. Once numbering approximately 3 million, the Bubi currently number around 100,000 worldwide.

The Bubi people, both in Equatorial Guinea and throughout the diaspora, have long held limited political power and economic stake in their ancestral homeland. While appointed officials such as former Prime Minister Miguel Abia Biteo Boricó and several members of the current government are of ethnic Bubi descent, much of the community’s influence has remained understated.

Most Bubi people that remain on Bioko Island, as well as those native to Gabon, speak the Bube language. Many of the islanders also speak Spanish, French and Portuguese as a secondary language.

== Etymology ==
The name applied to the tribe, "Bubi", did not originate from within the tribe. It was given to them by pre-colonial visitors to the island of Bioko. It has been suggested that the term "bubi" was derived from the Bubi word boobè (the people from the south of the island use moomè) which means "man". More than likely, the term was taken from Europeans who had heard the manner in which the indigenous people of Bioko Island greeted one another. "A boobe, oipodi" translates into "good morning, man". From the word "boobè", meaning male, the term Bubi was derived by foreigners. Subsequently, the term "bubi" was adopted by the indigenous people.

=== Endonyms ===
Originally the Bubi referred to themselves as "people of the land who are among the living". In the Bubi language, the translation of this phrase varied per region within the Bubi Kingdom:

- North — "bochoboche"; plural "bechoboche"
- Northeast — "bosoboiso"; plural "besoboiso"
- East — "boschosboricho"; plural "bachosboricho"
- South — "mochomorischo"; plural "bachoboricho"
- Southwest — "menchomoboncho"; plural "bandiobaboncho"

== History ==
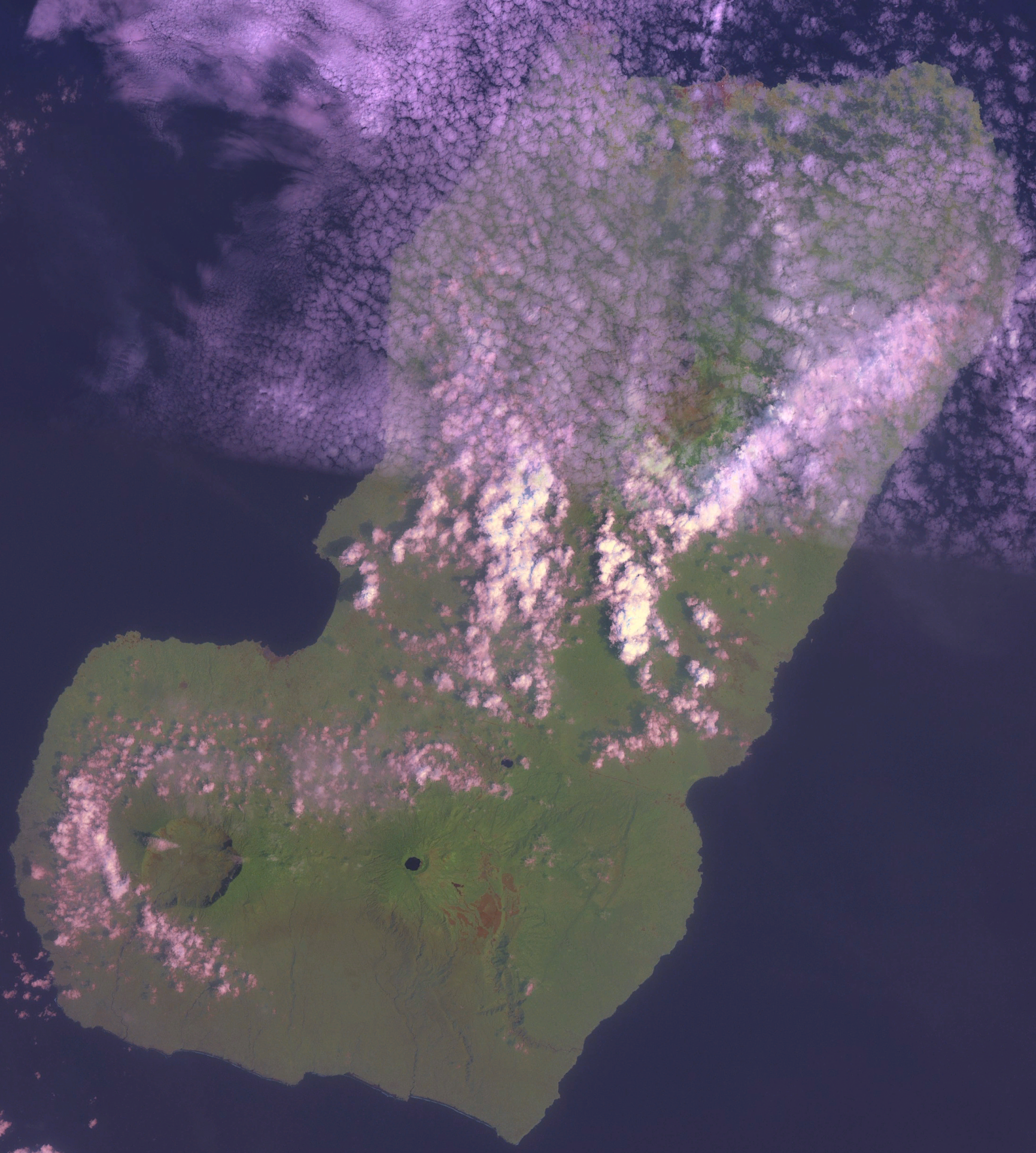
Bioko Island, the indigenous land of the Bubi Kingdom

The Bubi people are subdivided into a number of tribes and subtribes that go back centuries. Indigenous Bubi folklore indicate that the tribe immigrated to Bioko Island some 3,000 years ago as a means of escaping servitude. The Bubi immigrated to Bioko Island some time during the 13th century, some 200 years before it was colonized by the Portuguese. Other reports suggest that the tribe arrived between the 5th and the 18th centuries from southern Cameroon and the mainland area of the Río Muni.

One perspective offers that the Bubi were once enslaved by a single continental African tribe, likely another Bantu ethnic group that once occupied areas along the shores of West Africa. Another suggests those who immigrated to Bioko 3,000 years ago descended from enslaved members from a number of ethnic groups that existed up and down the West-Central African region during that time. In essence, the tribe is a result of an amalgamation of small tribal groups who immigrated to Bioko Island in several waves, and each group established its own enclave upon the island. Throughout their history, these groups engaged in brutal battles for supremacy, though the fighting was not relegated strictly to inter-clan rivalries. The Bubi were known to have had long battles against one another on an individual, family, district, city, and tribal level—this led to a near constant state of warfare on the island.

The Bubi were isolated and undisturbed for much time, leading them to form a unique society, language and belief system different from the mainland Bantus.

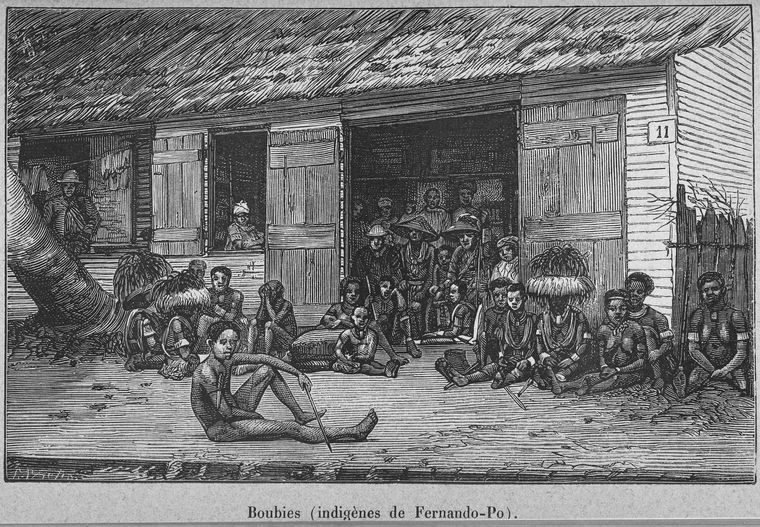
An 1875 engraving of the Bubi people

With the arrival of Portuguese explorer Fernando Po, life changed drastically for the native Bubi. Explorers killed the Bubis, and those Bubi who escaped the explorers caught diseases such as whooping cough, smallpox, and dysentery from the foreigners. For several centuries, Europeans attempted to penetrate the island of Bioko. They, however, were met with staunch resistance, purported savagery, by the Bubi. A German Gold Coast merchant wrote "The island of Fernando Po is inhabited by a savage and cruel sort of people," and that Europeans did not dare to dock upon their beaches, for fear of surprise attacks from natives with dart-weapons. Surprise attacks on explorers and colonists were a common phenomenon during this period—in fact, the Bubi had a system of social rank that depended largely on how many rivals a man had killed through stealth or subterfuge. Because of this, the Bubi remained unconquered by European imperialism until the start of the 20th century. Led by their kings, the Bubi were well aware of the slave trade in the region and, for centuries, were very wary of outsiders. This was later reduced when the island leadership began to trade and barter with the Europeans, so Europeans were able to infiltrate the island's social and political structures.

Gradually, European influence on the island increased. Portugal laid claim to it, and then traded it to Spain. By the early 19th century, Bioko was a short-term integral point in the transfer of slaves from mainland Africa to the Americas. However, the flow of humans trafficked through the port was constantly disrupted by indigenous groups who organized to steal and free many of those transported. The port was closed by the end of the 19th century at the order of the British government who set up military occupation of the port for the latter half of the century. Over time, the influence of the Bubi has greatly diminished, and they are now a minority upon the island, as well as in the nation of Equatorial Guinea itself.

=== 20th century and 21st century ===
Bubi separatist, or nationalist, flag

Francisco Macías Nguema was the first President of Equatorial Guinea, from 1968 until his overthrow in 1979. During his presidency, he declared himself a "Hitlerian-Marxist" and his country was nicknamed "the Auschwitz of Africa". Nguema's regime was characterized by its abandonment of all government functions except internal security, which was accomplished by terror; he acted as chief judge and sentenced thousands to death. This led to the death or exile of up to 1/3 of the country's population. Out of a population of 300,000, an estimated 80,000 had been killed, in particular those of the Bubi ethnic minority on Bioko associated with relative wealth and intellectualism. He would also impose penalties on anyone speaking languages other than the Fang language. All schools were ordered closed in 1975. The economy collapsed, and skilled citizens and foreigners left.

On August 3, 1979, he was overthrown by Teodoro Obiang Nguema Mbasogo. Macías Nguema was captured, tried for genocide and other crimes along with 10 others. All of them were found guilty. Four received terms of imprisonment, while Nguema and the other six were executed a few weeks later on September 29.

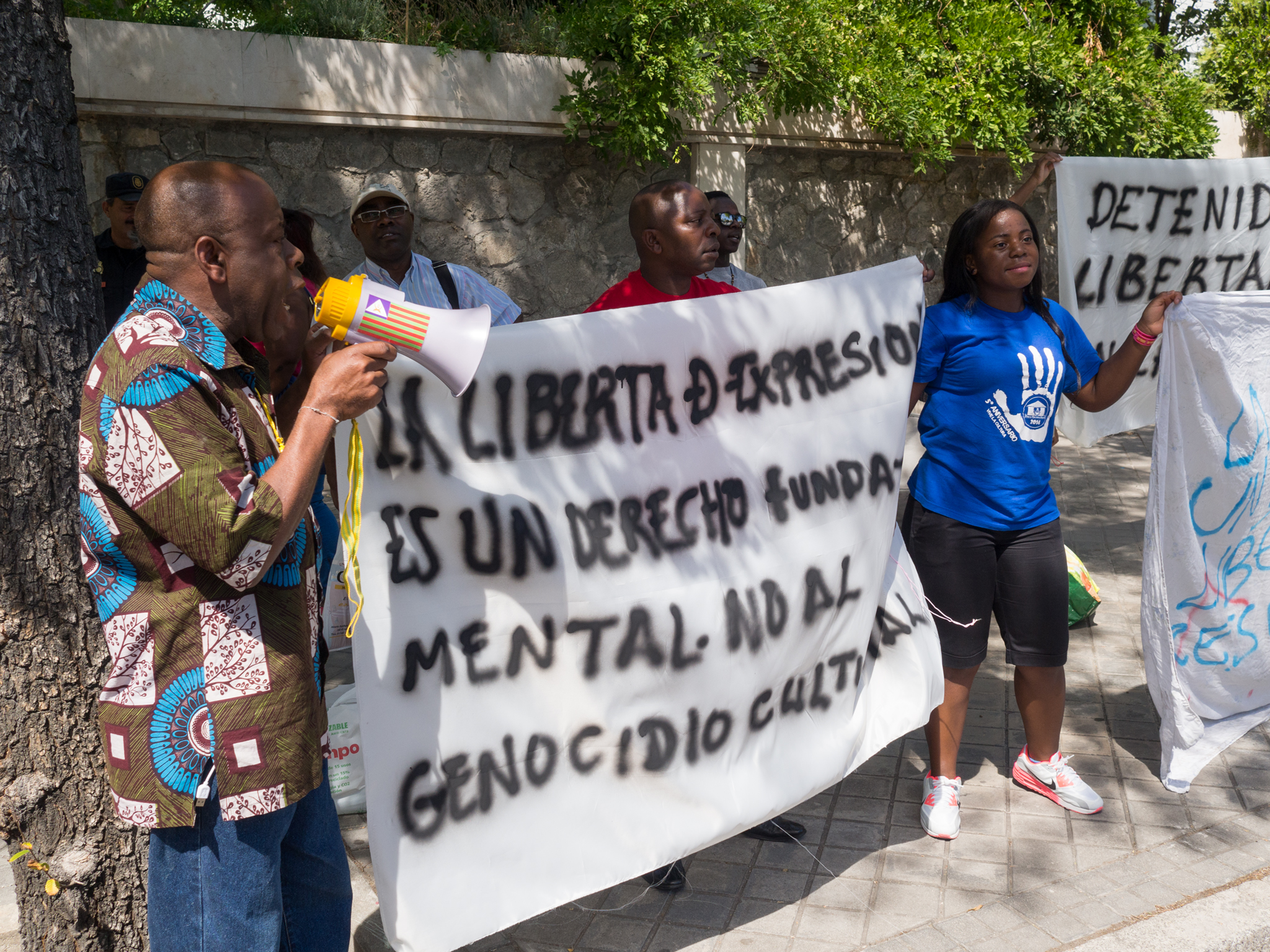
Protest against the persecution of the Bubi culture in front of the Embassy of Equatorial Guinea in Madrid

In 1998, many Bubi people were tortured to extract confessions following their arrest after launching several attacks on military barracks in which three soldiers and several civilians were killed. At least six detainees reportedly died after being tortured. Bubi women were publicly humiliated in the courtyard of the police station in Malabo with some being forced to swim naked in the mud in front of other detainees whilst others were sexually abused.

John B. Quigley in The Genocide Convention: An International Law Analysis points out that at Macías Nguema's trial for genocide that Equatorial Guinea had not ratified the Genocide Convention and that records of the court proceedings show that there was some confusion over whether Nguema and his co-defendants were tried under the laws of Spain, or whether the trial was justified on the claim that the Genocide Convention was part of customary international law. Quigley states that "The Macias case stands out as the most confusing of domestic genocide prosecutions from the standpoint of the applicable law. The Macias conviction is also problematic from the standpoint of the identity of the protected group."

Traditionally, the prime minister of Equatorial Guinea has been from the Bubi minority. The last Bubi prime minister was Miguel Abia Biteo Boricó, following the forced resignation of Boricó's cabinet in August 2006 on charges of corruption and incompetence. Obiang then appointed Ricardo Mangue Obama Nfubea, who was a Fang.

== Religion ==
The Bubi people are mainly Catholics. This is due to Spanish influence during the colonial age when the Spanish ruled over Bioko Island and Río Muni.

Traditional pre-Christian beliefs are prevalent in Bubi spirituality. In the ancient belief system of the Bubi, the head god was called Rupe (or Eri in the southern region of the island) who created and cared for the world. The spirit world was said to consist of three parts: Labako-ppua (heaven and the angels), Ommo ich'ori (hell and the bad angels), and Ommo boeboe (limbo). The spiritual world and material world constantly melded and layered upon each other which meant that the Bubi people and the supernatural spirits shared the land. Sinister spirits were blamed for illness, accidents, and misfortune. Every unique natural landmark was also said to be associated with a spirit with rivers, lakes, and mountains having specific spiritual power.

== Notable ethnic Bubi people ==
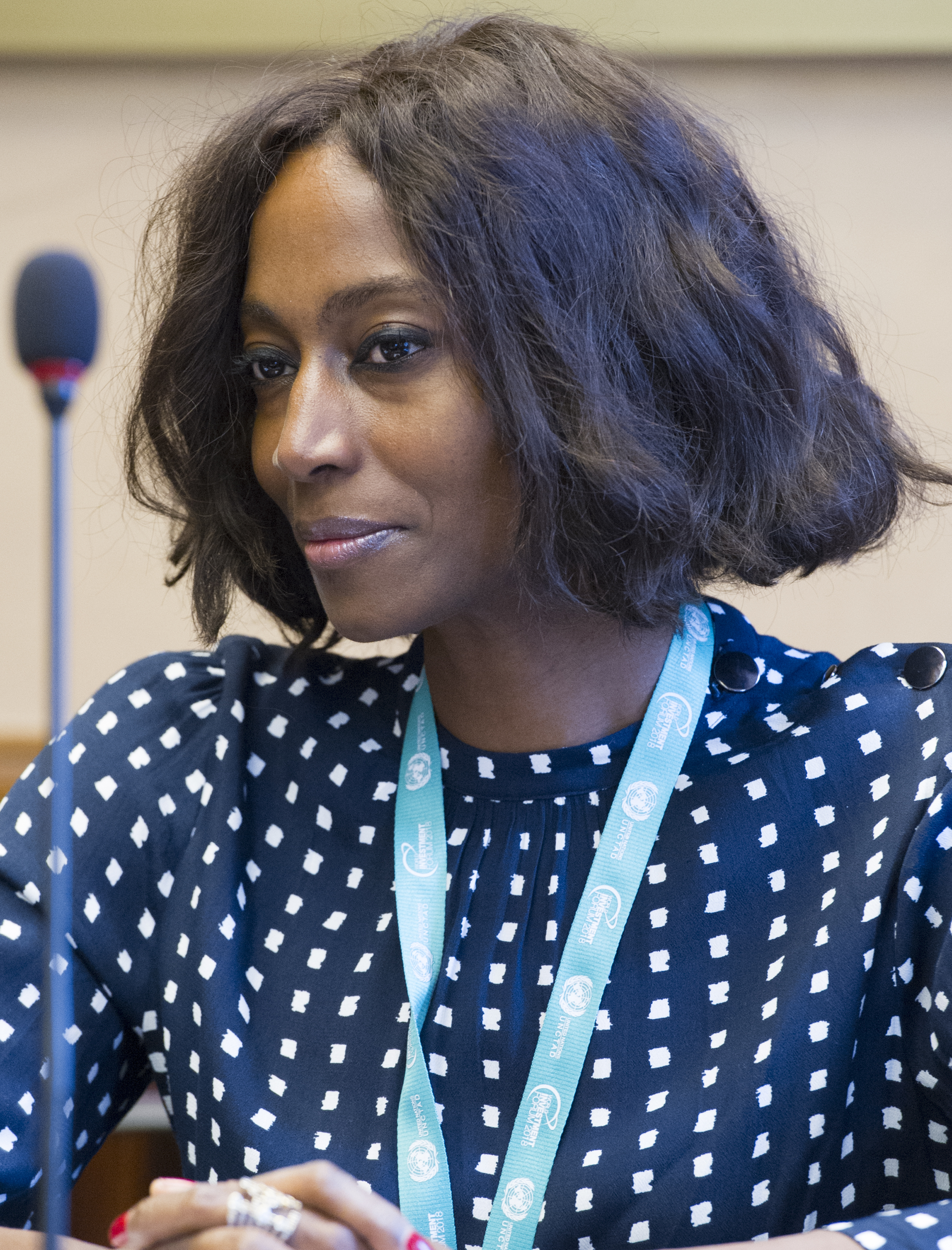
Bisila Bokoko

- Silvestre Siale Bileka
- Cristino Seriche Bioko
- Aauri Bokesa
- Bisila Bokoko
- Sipo Bohale
- Jade Boho
- Justo Bolekia Boleká
- Juan Balboa Boneke
- Miguel Abia Biteo Boricó
- Rita Bosaho
- Dorian Jr. (Meha, mother)
- Emilio Buale
- Concha Buika
- Virginia Buika
- Jannick Buyla
- Raúl Fabiani (Bosio, mother)
- Marvin Anieboh (Lajay, maternal grandmother)
- Hugo Buyla
- Óscar Siafá
- Jordan Gutiérrez (Silebo, maternal grandmother)
- Omar Mascarell (Inta, paternal grandfather's mother)
- Hijas del Sol (Apo)

== Bubi royalty ==
=== Bamöumá Dynasty ===
- Mölambo (1700-1760)
- Loríité (1760-1810)
- Löpóa (1810-1842)

=== Bahítáari Dynasty ===
- Möadyabitá (1842-1860)
- Sëpaókó (1860-1874 o 1875)
- Moka (1875-1899)
- Sás-Ebuera (1899-1904)
- Malabo Lopelo Melaka (1904-1937)
- Malabo II (1937-2001)

== See also ==
- Bubi language
- Emancipados
- Fernandino peoples
- Movement for the Self-Determination of Bioko Island
- Human rights in Equatorial Guinea

== Sources ==
- Vines, Alex (2009). Well Oiled: Oil and Human Rights in Equatorial Guinea. Human Rights Watch. ISBN 9781564325167.
- Williams, Victoria R. (February 24, 2020). Indigenous Peoples: An Encyclopedia of Culture, History, and Threats to Survival [4 Volumes]. ABC-Clio. ISBN 9781440861185.
