= Movement for the Self-Determination of Bioko Island =

Political organization in Equatorial Guinea

Movement for the Self-Determination of Bioko Island Movimiento para la Autodeterminación de la Isla de Bioko
- Leader: Honorato Maho Chuaha
- Founded: 1993
- Ideology: African nationalism Separatism; Democratic socialism

Party flag

Website
- www.maib.es

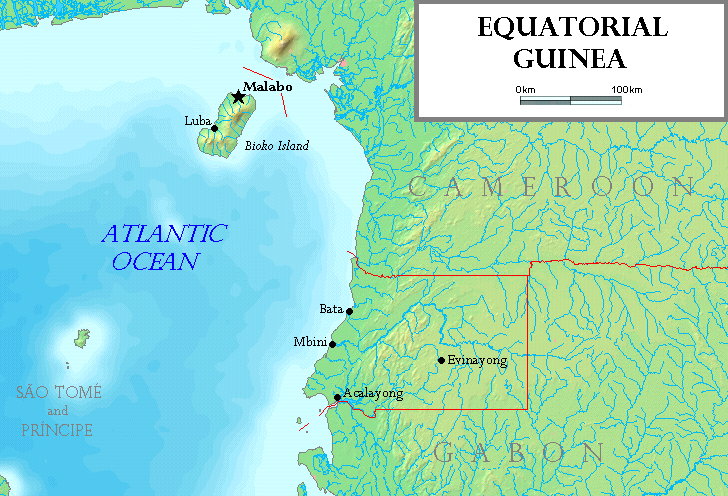
Map of Equatorial Guinea

The Movement for the Self-Determination of Bioko Island (Spanish: Movimiento para la Auto-determinación de la Isla de Bioko) is a proscribed political organization in Equatorial Guinea. It has its roots in the pre-independence Unión Bubi, which sought independence from the mainland half of Spanish Guinea. It is supported by the Bubi ethnic group, which dominates Bioko island (home of the national capital).

The Unión Bubi wanted the Spanish government to separate the Bubi-dominated Bioko and the Fang-dominated Río Muni (the mainland half of Equatorial Guinea) because, if the nation were united, the Bubi would be at the mercy of the Fang, who greatly outnumbered them nine to one. During the Spanish colonial era, the Bubi received better treatment and more education than the other ethnic groups, and many in the ethnic group feared that the country would be taken over by "illiterates." A vibrant political movement grew around the cause of independence for Bioko.

Under the rule of Francisco Macías Nguema (1968-1979), almost all Bubi political activists were either killed or exiled, and any aspirations for autonomy were dashed. President Teodoro Obiang Nguema Mbasogo (1979-), a Fang from the same family as Macías, continued the policy of prohibiting separatist movements.

The MAIB has support from traditional Bubi leaders and some of the general population of Bioko, but the party is forced by law to operate secretly. The MAIB gained international attention when one of its main leaders, Weja Chicampo, was tortured and severely injured in March 2004 by government agents.

Some years before, on January 21, 1998, military governmental forces had strongly fought against an attempt of independence from the mainland. Hundreds of Bubi were tortured and abused in Black Beach. People know a little about what happened in the south and center of Bioko Island where hundreds of Bubi disappeared. Those events are related in a book by a witness to the events, the Italian writer Franco Lelli, Okiri: Una Storia Africana (I.P.S.I.A. Terni, 2005).
