= 1968 Equatorial Guinea constitution =

Constitution of Equatorial Guinea of 1968
- First flag of the Equatorial Guinea

Overview
- Jurisdiction: Republic of Equatorial Guinea
- Created: 17 April 1968
- Ratified: 11 August 1968
- Date effective: 12 October 1968
- System: Unitary presidential republic
- Repealed: 29 July 1973

Full text
- 1968 Equatorial Guinea constitution at Wikisource

The Constitution of Equatorial Guinea of 1968, was promulgated with a view to the independence of the Republic of Equatorial Guinea on October 12, 1968. It is the first Constitution promulgated in Equatorial Guinea, in addition to being a text that enshrines liberal democracy, popular sovereignty, freedom of religion and the right of self-determination, when in Spain it is still the regime of Francisco Franco was in force.

According to the text, Equatorial Guinea was configured as a sovereign, indivisible, democratic and social Republic, with a presidential system, the president being elected by direct and secret universal suffrage for a five-year term. Likewise, the Constitution ensured the fundamental rights and freedoms of the individual, based the political structure on the vote of all citizens and determined the separation of functions between the legislative, executive and judicial bodies.

== History ==
In December 1966 the Spanish Council of Ministers agreed to prepare the Constitutional Conference. On October 30, 1967, said Conference was inaugurated. After the second phase of the Constitutional Conference (from April 17 to June 22, 1968), the Constitution (whose main editor was Miguel Herrero de Minon) was published in the Official Gazette of Equatorial Guinea on July 24, 1968, and was ratified in a popular referendum held on August 11 under the supervision of a team of United Nations observers. 64.32% of the electorate voted in favor of the Constitution, which envisaged a government with a General Assembly and a Supreme Court with judges appointed by the president.

Officially, it was in force for four years, from its promulgation until July 1973, when a new Constitution was approved. However, it barely entered into force de facto, since in its period of application the country had just achieved independence under the command of Francisco Macías. In March 1969, in the midst of a serious crisis with Spain, he announced the existence of an attempted coup d'état, taking the opportunity to put the political opposition out of play (Bonifacio Ondó Edu, Atanasio Ndongo, Federico Ngomo, etc.). In May 1971 he repealed part of its articles to strengthen his personal power and establish a one-party dictatorship, through Decree No. 115, (May 7, 1971). In it, Macías held "the Spanish neo-colonialists and imperialists responsible for two coup attempts, putting their traitorous African lackeys on the screen" and justified the repeal of part of the text by stating that the current Constitution, despite participating himself in its elaboration, it had been "prefabricated by Spain". Along the same lines, in July 1972 he promulgated a Constitutional Law declaring himself president of the country for life.

== Content and structure ==
The text of the Constitution was organized around a Preamble, ten titles with 58 articles and a series of final provisions (three transitory and one complementary, the latter providing for the ratification of the text through the subsequent popular referendum) in accordance with the following structure:

- Preamble
- Qualification. I - THE STATE AND THE CITIZENS (Articles 1 to 8)
- Title II. - OF THE HEAD OF STATE (articles 9 to 15)
- Title III. - OF THE ASSEMBLY OF THE REPUBLIC (Articles 16 to 33)
- Title IV. - RELATIONSHIPS BETWEEN THE GOVERNMENT AND THE ASSEMBLY OF THE REPUBLIC (articles 34 to 40)
- Title V. - THE COUNCIL OF THE REPUBLIC (Articles 41 and 42)
- Title VI. - ON THE COMPETENCES OF THE STATE AND PROVINCES (Articles 43 and 44)
- Title VII - OF THE PROVINCES AND MUNICIPALITIES (articles 45 to 49)
- Title VIII. - ON THE ADMINISTRATION OF JUSTICE (Articles 50 to 53)
- Title IX. - ON INTERNATIONAL RELATIONS (Articles 54 to 57)
- Title X. - OF THE CONSTITUTIONAL REFORM (article 58)
- TRANSITORY DISPOSITIONS
- SUPPLEMENTARY PROVISION
