= Gerardo Angüe Mangue =

Equatoguinean political activist

- Occupation: political activist
- Known for: 2008 arrest
- Political party: Progress Party of Equatorial Guinea

Gerardo Angüe Mangue is an Equatoguinean political activist currently imprisoned on weapons possession charges. His imprisonment has drawn protest from the US State Department and Amnesty International, the latter of which considers him to be a prisoner of conscience.

Mangue was the secretary to Severo Moto, leader of the Progress Party of Equatorial Guinea (PPGE), a banned political party opposing the long-dominant Democratic Party of Equatorial Guinea. On 12 March 2008, he was arrested without a warrant, and documents were confiscated from his home. Within the next month, fellow PPGE activists Cruz Obiang Ebele, Emiliano Esono Michá, Juan Ecomo Ndong, Gumersindo Ramírez Faustino, and Bonifacio Nguema Ndong were also arrested. Mangue was held for two months at the police station, where he was allegedly forced to sign a statement under duress.

In May 2008, the six men were charged with knowledge of a weapons cache in the home of another PPGE activist, Saturnino Ncogo. Ncogo died in prison on early March under suspicious circumstances. Authorities alleged he had thrown himself from the top bunk of his cell to commit suicide, but relatives received his body in an advanced state of decomposition, and no investigation was ever conducted. According to Amnesty International, the six men were given an unfair trial at which no evidence was presented save the weapons from Ncogo's home and the statements the six had made under duress; in addition, the six defendants alleged that police had altered their statements after the defendants had signed them.

Despite being charged with unrelated crimes, the six were tried alongside Simon Mann, a UK national who had helped to organize a 2004 coup attempt. Mann and Nick du Toit were later pardoned, released from jail and repatriated. The six PPGE members were given sentences of one to five years apiece. The US State Department considers Mangue a political prisoner and has objected to his continued imprisonment. Amnesty International granted him "prisoner of conscience" status and has called for his immediate release.
