= Gumersindo Ramírez Faustino =

Equatoguinean political activist

- Occupation: political activist
- Known for: 2008 imprisonment
- Political party: Progress Party of Equatorial Guinea

Gumersindo Ramírez Faustino is an Equatoguinean political activist currently imprisoned on weapons possession charges. His imprisonment has drawn protest from the US State Department and Amnesty International, the latter of which considers him to be a prisoner of conscience.

Ramírez Faustino was active with the Progress Party of Equatorial Guinea (PPGE), a banned political party opposing the long-dominant Democratic Party of Equatorial Guinea. In late March 2008, he was arrested without a warrant. Within a week, fellow PPGE activists Cruz Obiang Ebele, Emiliano Esono Michá, Juan Ecomo Ndong, Gerardo Angüe Mangue, and Bonifacio Nguema Ndong were also arrested. He was held for two months at the police station, turning which time he was allegedly tortured.

In May 2008, the six men were charged with knowledge of a weapons cache in the home of another PPGE activist, Saturnino Ncogo. Ncogo had died in prison on early March in suspicious circumstances. Authorities alleged he had thrown himself from the top bunk of his cell to commit suicide, but relatives received his body in an advanced state of decomposition, and no investigation was ever conducted. According to Amnesty International, the six men were given an unfair trial at which no evidence was presented save the weapons from Ncogo's home and the statements the six had made under duress; in addition, the six defendants alleged that police had altered their statements after the defendants had signed them.

Despite being charged with unrelated crimes, the six were tried alongside Simon Mann, a UK national who had helped to organize a 2004 coup attempt. The six PPGE members were given sentences of one to five years apiece.

The US State Department considers Ramírez Faustino a political prisoner, and has objected to his continued imprisonment. Amnesty International named him a prisoner of conscience, and has called for his immediate release.
