= Bujeba =

Bujeba, or Kwasio, may refer to:

- the Bujeba people
- the Bujeba language
