= Salvador Ondo Nkumu =

Equatoguinean politician and former judge

Salvador Ondo Nkumu is an Equatoguinean politician and former judge who has served as the country's Minister of Justice since 2018. He had previously served as Minister of Justice from 2008 to 2011.

== Career ==
Ondo Nkumu adjourned the trial of 14 suspected foreign mercenaries involved in the 2004 attempted coup d'état for 30 days at the prosecutor's request stating that more time was needed to investigate the case and that the suspension of the trial would end once all "complementary investigations" were conducted. He also read out the verdicts and sentences for the mercenaries and others involved in the coup which included 34 years for South African arms dealer Nick du Toit who would later be pardoned and 63 years for exiled opposition leader Severo Moto who was sentenced in absentia. The case received international media attention due to the involvement of Mark Thatcher who was fined separately in South Africa in connection with the coup.

In August 2010, Ondo Nkumu held a four-day inauguration seminar for the Institute of Judicial Practice of Equatorial Guinea. The seminar's main purpose was for it to be a public presentation of the institute and to celebrate the eighteenth birthday of the judiciary in Equatorial Guinea.

In a January 2011 cabinet reshuffle, he was succeeded as Minister of Justice by Francisco Javier Ngomo who had been the president of the Constitutional Court.

Ondo Nkumu then became the President of the Constitutional Court of Equatorial Guinea and was in charge of validating and reading out the results of the 2017 legislative election which saw the Democratic Party of Equatorial Guinea obtain 99 of the 100 deputies of the Chamber of Deputies.

He was reappointed as Minister of Justice in February 2018.

Ondo Nkumu assisted in the establishment of a prison in Oveng Ansem which opened on 27 July 2018. He said that the new prison is part of a program to modernize the National Penitentiary System conceived by President Teodoro Obiang Nguema Mbasogo, which meets three basic requirements: comply with maximum security, dignified treatment of prisoners and security and social rehabilitation. President Teodoro Obiang Nguema Mbasogo said criticism received by the government that it treats prisoners admitted to jails badly is one of the reasons for the creation of the program.

In October 2019, he met with his Moroccan counterpart Mohamed Ben Abdelkader in Marrakesh, whilst attending the second International Justice Conference.

In February 2022, Ondo Nkumu presented the Penal Code of Equatorial Guinea bill to the Commission of Justice and Human Rights after its review in the Chamber of Deputies as part of a political program to update and nationalize the legal system of Equatorial Guinea. The bill was conceived and sponsored by President Teodoro Obiang Nguema Mbasogo and was an elaboration of a draft from 2009.
