= Ngumba =

Ngumba may refer to:

- Ngumba language, or Kwasio, of Cameroon
- Ngumba people of South Region (Cameroon)
