= Gyele people =

Pygmy ethnic group of Gabon and Equatorial Guinea

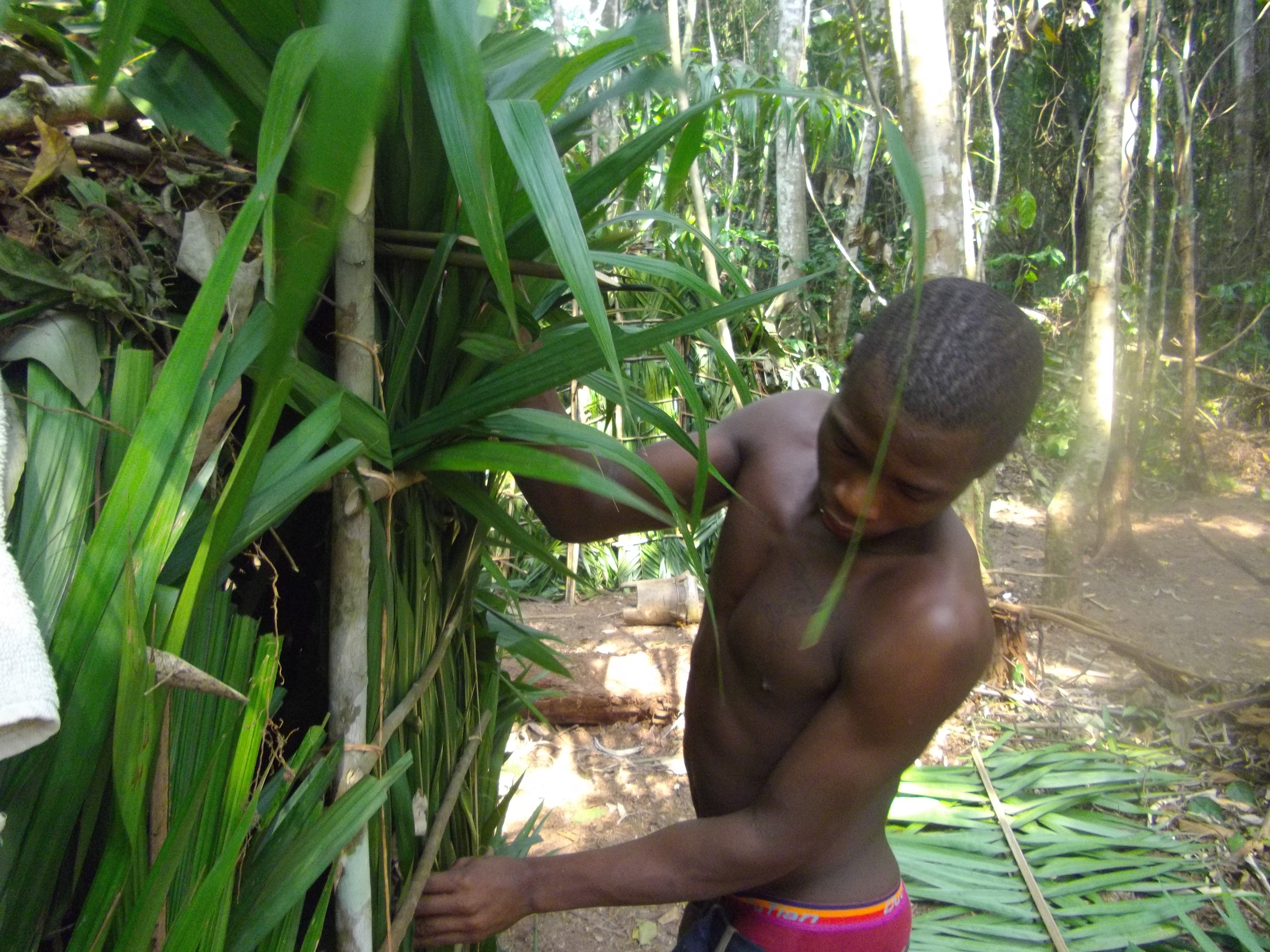
Gyele man building a house in 2010

The Gyele (Bagyele / Bajele), also known as the Kola (Bakola) or Koya (Bakoya), are the pygmies of southern Cameroon and adjacent areas of Gabon and Equatorial Guinea. They live among Bantu patrons, the Mvumbo and Bassa. They speak a variety of or a language closely related to Mvumbo.

Map of the Gyeli area in Cameroon (dots) with neighbouring languages/peoples

Ethnically, the Gyele are close to other Mbenga peoples such as the Aka and Baka, but their languages are not close. There are two dialects, Jele which was closely associated with the Mvumbo, and Kola (also pronounced Koya), which was closely associated with the Basaa. Other farming peoples they live with are the Yasa, Batanga, Bakoko, Mvae, Ewondo and Beti.

== See also ==
The name Bakola/Bakoya is also used for the pygmies of the Congo–Gabon border region.
