= Progress Party of Equatorial Guinea =

Political party in Equatorial Guinea

Progress Party of Equatorial Guinea Partido del Progreso de Guinea Ecuatorial
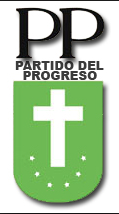
- Abbreviation: PPGE
- President: Severo Moto Nsá
- Founded: 25 February 1983
- Legalised: 1992
- Headquarters: Madrid, Spain
- Ideology: Liberal democracy Economic liberalism
- Political position: Centre-right
- Colours: Green White
- Chamber of Deputies: 0 / 100
- Senate: 0 / 55

Website
- partidodelprogreso.org

The Progress Party of Equatorial Guinea (Spanish: Partido del Progreso de Guinea Ecuatorial) is a pro-market, pro-democracy political party in Equatorial Guinea. It was founded in Madrid in 1983 by Severo Moto.

The party leadership has declared a "government in exile" in Spain, with party leader Severo Moto as "President". PP members who remain in Equatorial Guinea are heavily harassed and prosecuted.

In 2008, seven PPGE members were arrested in Malobo on charges of weapons possession, including Moto's former secretary Gerardo Angüe Mangue. The alleged owner of the weapons, Saturnino Ncogo, had died in prison within days of his arrest under suspicious circumstances. Authorities alleged he had thrown himself from the top bunk of his cell to commit suicide, but relatives received his body in an advanced state of decomposition, and no investigation was ever conducted. The remaining six PPGE activists—Mangue, Cruz Obiang Ebele, Emiliano Esono Michá, Juan Ecomo Ndong, Gumersindo Ramírez Faustino, and Bonifacio Nguema Ndong—were tried alongside Simon Mann, a UK national who had helped to organize a 2004 coup attempt, despite their charges being wholly unrelated. The party members were given sentences of one to five years' imprisonment apiece. Their imprisonment has been protested by the US State Department and Amnesty International, the latter of which named the six men prisoners of conscience.
