= Nigel Morgan =

British-South African consultant (1954–2018)

Nigel Jeremy Morgan (25 September 1954, in Woking, Surrey – 17 November 2018, in Harrismith, South Africa) was a British-South African security consultant. A former British Army officer with close ties to South African intelligence, he was credited with exposing an attempted coup against the government of Equatorial Guinea in 2004.

== Personal ==
Morgan was the son of Ronan 'Bowlegs' Morgan, an Irish publisher who was a regular at El Vino on Fleet Street, and Pamela (nee Martin) from the prominent Irish family of Richard Martin. He was the nephew of rugby player Cliff Morgan. An older brother, Malcolm, was killed in a motorcycle accident in 1970.

== Education ==
After attending Cranleigh until he was 18, Morgan was trained at Royal Military Academy Sandhurst in 1974 and joined the Irish Guards. After passing out from RMAS, he read Politics at Durham University on a military bursary, where he was President of the Durham Union for Epiphany term of 1978. He finished his degree in 1978, receiving a 2.2.

Per the conditions of the bursary, Morgan was required to complete a minimum period of service with the British Army after finishing his degree.

== Career ==
While based with his regiment in London, Morgan became familiar with many of the thinkers involved in Thatcherism, including John Hoskyns, a special adviser to Prime Minister Margaret Thatcher. He campaigned to have his commission rescinded – telling his commanding officer he 'couldn't command a tea trolley' – but was unsuccessful. On leaving the army he worked alongside Alfred Sherman at the Centre for Policy Studies and choosing to resign alongside his intellectual mentor in 1983 in protest at the leadership of Hugh Thomas.

Later in the decade he spent a year training as a Jesuit priest but left over disagreements about the newly fashionable Liberation theology. What followed was stints prospecting for gold in the Yukon with a friend from the Scots Guards and a haphazard gold-buying venture in Liberia in which he lost $1 million of investors’ money on gold-coated brass.

In 1991 he moved to South Africa and worked as a freelance security consultant. His talent for this work was clear and he became friends with politicians and figures in the intelligence community, and produced analysis for high profile risk management firms in London. In 2000 he left for the Democratic Republic of the Congo to manage security at a diamond mine operated by the state-owned firm MIBA, but was forced to leave after receiving death threats likely related to him pointing out the repeated theft of diamonds by MIBA employees.

=== Wonga coup ===
In 2004 he was named in connection with the so-called 'Wonga plot', a coup attempt against President Teodoro Obiang Nguema Mbasogo, the dictator of oil-rich Equatorial Guinea. The case received international attention when Constantia resident Mark Thatcher was named as one of the financiers. Morgan was close friends with both Thatcher and Special Air Service officer turned mercenary Simon Mann.

Because Morgan had connections with the South African Secret Service, some of those involved in the planned coup reportedly assumed they enjoyed the tacit support of the South African government. This apparently included Mann himself. In order to gather more information about Mann's plans, Morgan offered his protege, James Kershaw, to act as an assistant to Mann which Mann freely accepted. Kershaw fed information back to Morgan who used it to write several reports for international intelligence agencies. After several attempts to warn both Mann and Thatcher, and meetings with both, Morgan was forced to confirm the existence of the plot with the authorities. As Morgan had warned, Mann and his co-conspirators were arrested in Zimbabwe after their Boeing 727 stopped off in Harare to pick up weapons and equipment.

Morgan explained his actions by arguing that Mann's plot was amoral and he had told him not to go ahead with it. Claiming the plot to be 'the worst kept secret in South Africa', Morgan maintained that the plan had almost no chance of succeeding, was in breach of international law and would have hugely embarrassed the South African government, which justified his intervention.

=== Later Years & Wildlife Conservation ===
Morgan set up two political intelligence and security companies. The first was called 'Rhula Intelligent Solutions' and the second, 'Focus Africa'. He split his time between his rural home in the Drakensberg, South Africa and other African countries, most especially Maputo in Mozambique.

In addition to his work in political risk and security, Morgan became active in wildlife preservation with the non-profit Focus Africa Foundation. In 2013, as spokesman for the Joaquin Chissano Foundation, he announced plans to set up an armed unit to prevent Rhino poaching.

== Death ==
As a lifeline bon viveur and excellent host, Morgan came to rely on alcohol more after relationships fell apart at Focus Africa. After a successful stint in residential rehab in 2017, he began drinking again in 2018 and died of the accumulated damage to his liver later that year surrounded by his family and friends. In 2019, a memorial service was held at Farm Street Church in London, followed by a reception at the Cavalry and Guards Club.
