= Bujeba dialect =

Bantu language of southern Cameroon and Equatorial Guinea

Bujeba
- Bisio
- Native to: Equatorial Guinea
- Native speakers: 13,000 (2019)
- Language family: Niger–Congo?: Atlantic–Congo; Benue–Congo; Bantu (Zone A); Makaa–Njem; Mvumboic; Kwasio; Bujeba

Language codes
- ISO 639-3: nmg
- Glottolog: kwas1243

Bujeba also known as Bisio is a dialect of the Kwasio language spoken around Southern Bata and South of Rio Benito, in Equatorial Guinea.

== Phonology ==
=== Consonants ===
		Labial	Dental/ Alveolar	Post-alv./ Palatal	Velar	Glottal
Nasal		m	n	ɲ	ŋ	
Plosive	voiceless	p	t		k	(ʔ)
Plosive	voiced	b	d		ɡ	
Plosive	prenasal vl.	ᵐp	ⁿt		ᵑk	
Plosive	prenasal vd.	ᵐb	ⁿd		ᵑɡ	
Affricate	voiceless	p͡f	(t͡s)	t͡ʃ	(k͡p)	
Affricate	voiced	b͡v	(d͡z)	d͡ʒ	(ɡ͡b)	
Fricative	voiceless	f	s	ʃ		
Fricative	voiced	v	z	ʒ	(ɣ)	
Fricative	prenasal	ᶬv	ⁿz	ᶮʒ		
Approximant			l	j	w	

- Other consonant sounds occur as palatalized /tʲ, dʲ, kʲ, ɡʲ/ and as labialized /ŋʷ/.
- Sounds /t͡ʃ, d͡ʒ/ are sometimes realized as [t͡s, d͡z] in free variation among speakers.
- Sounds /t, d/ are phonetically dental as [t̪, d̪].
- /ɡ/ may also be heard as [ɣ] in free variation.
- Sounds /b, d, ɡ/ may be lenited as [β, ɾ, ɣ] in intervocalic positions.
- /l/ may also be heard as [r] in free variation.
- Sounds /k͡p, ɡ͡b/ are mostly heard from loanwords.
- A glottal stop [ʔ] may also be heard, however; it is not phonemic and is only heard phonetically at the end of words.

=== Vowels ===
	Front	Central	Back
Close	i iː		u uː
Mid	e eː		o oː
Open		a aː	

- Vowels /i, e, o, u/ may also be heard as [ɪ, ɛ, ɔ, ʊ] in unstressed positions.
