= Focus Africa Foundation =

South African non-profit organisation

The Focus-Africa Foundation is a non-profit organisation registered in South Africa. It works with the Joaquim Chissano Foundation (FJC), which was started by the ex president of Mozambique, Joaquim Chissano, on promoting the social, economic, and cultural development of Mozambique. The Focus Africa Foundation primarily works with the FJC on its Wildlife Preservation Initiative, especially with anti-rhino poaching efforts.

== History ==
The foundation was started in 2014 and has the registration number 2014/027537/08.

== Partners ==
The foundation has been involved with and partnered with various organisations, such as the World Youth Rhino Summit, Rhula Intelligent Solutions, Freeland, Semantic Research, the Satao Project, and Outraged South Africa Citizens Against Poaching (OSCAP).

== Research ==
The Focus Africa Foundation has worked with various anti-rhino poaching stakeholders and occasionally performs and publishes poaching statistics, estimates, and research. Examples of these publications include year on year comparisons on the number of rhinos poached in the Kruger National Park (KNP), birth rates, death rates, and estimated population decline figures also for the rhinos in the KNP.

While the foundation does have a website most of its information is published via social media channels, such as its Facebook page and Twitter account.
