= Severo Moto Nsá =

Equatoguinean politician

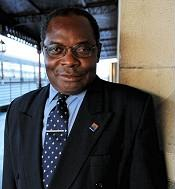
- Severo Moto in Toledo, Spain, 2008.

President of the Progress Party of Equatorial Guinea
- In office 25 February 1983 – present

Personal details
- Born: Severo Matías Moto Nsá; 6 November 1943 (age 82) Niefang, Spanish Guinea
- Party: Progress Party

Severo Matías Moto Nsá (born November 6, 1943), known as Severo Moto, is an Equatorial Guinean politician. The leader of the Progress Party of Equatorial Guinea, he currently lives in Spain, where he has established a government in exile.

Born at Acock in Río Muni, Moto trained to become a Catholic priest. Under President Francisco Macías Nguema, he was a radio operator and newspaper editor during the 1970s. President Teodoro Obiang Nguema Mbasogo initially entrusted Moto representing Equatorial Guinea at the Non-Aligned Movement's summit in Havana in September 1979, the position of Technical Director at the Ministry of Information and Tourism in 1980, and the post of Minister of Information and Tourism in 1981. However, Moto and President Obiang had a falling-out shortly thereafter, reportedly due to disagreement over policy and Moto's preference for reforms to allow more openness; he fled Equatorial Guinea in December 1981 and settled in Spain, where he remained active as an opposition leader in exile.

Returning home as an opposition leader, Moto was imprisoned at Malabo's Black Beach prison, but later released and allowed to return to Spain. He claims to have won several elections in Equatorial Guinea. He was accused by Equatorial Guinea of being the instigator of the March 2004 attempt led by Simon Mann and Nick du Toit, and tried in absentia. He disappeared for a short time in 2005, only to reappear unharmed. He claimed a pair of hitmen had taken him out on a yacht in Dubrovnik, Croatia, where he went to seek funding for the political campaign against Obiang, only to let him go because he was a fellow Roman Catholic.

== In Spain ==
On December 30, 2005 the Spanish government lifted his political asylum. Moto stated that before being expelled to a third country he would return to Equatorial Guinea in order to call for free elections. He appealed the decision, and eventually, in March 2008, the Spanish Supreme Court upheld his asylum request.

Weapons were found in a car at the port in Sagunto on March 4, 2008 and they were reportedly about to be sent to Equatorial Guinea. Moto was arrested in Toledo Province in mid-April 2008 on suspicion of involvement in this.
