= Altos de Nsork National Park =

National park in Equatorial Guinea

- IUCN category II (national park)
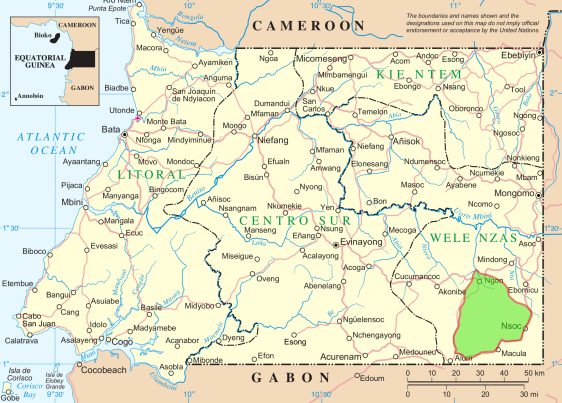
- Boundaries of Altos de Nsork (green shaded area)

- Location within Equatorial Guinea Location within Africa
- Nearest city: Nsok
- Coordinates: 1.16°N 11.12°E
- Area: 70,000 hectares (270 sq mi)

The Altos de Nsork National Park (Spanish: Parque nacional de Los Altos de Nsork) is located in mainland Equatorial Guinea. It was established in 2000.

== Geography and environment ==
The terrain is one of high hills, with low and dissected terraces. The park covers 700 square kilometres (270 sq mi). The area is bounded on the west side by the Abang River, and on the east and south by roads; there are few roads in the park.

=== Wildlife ===
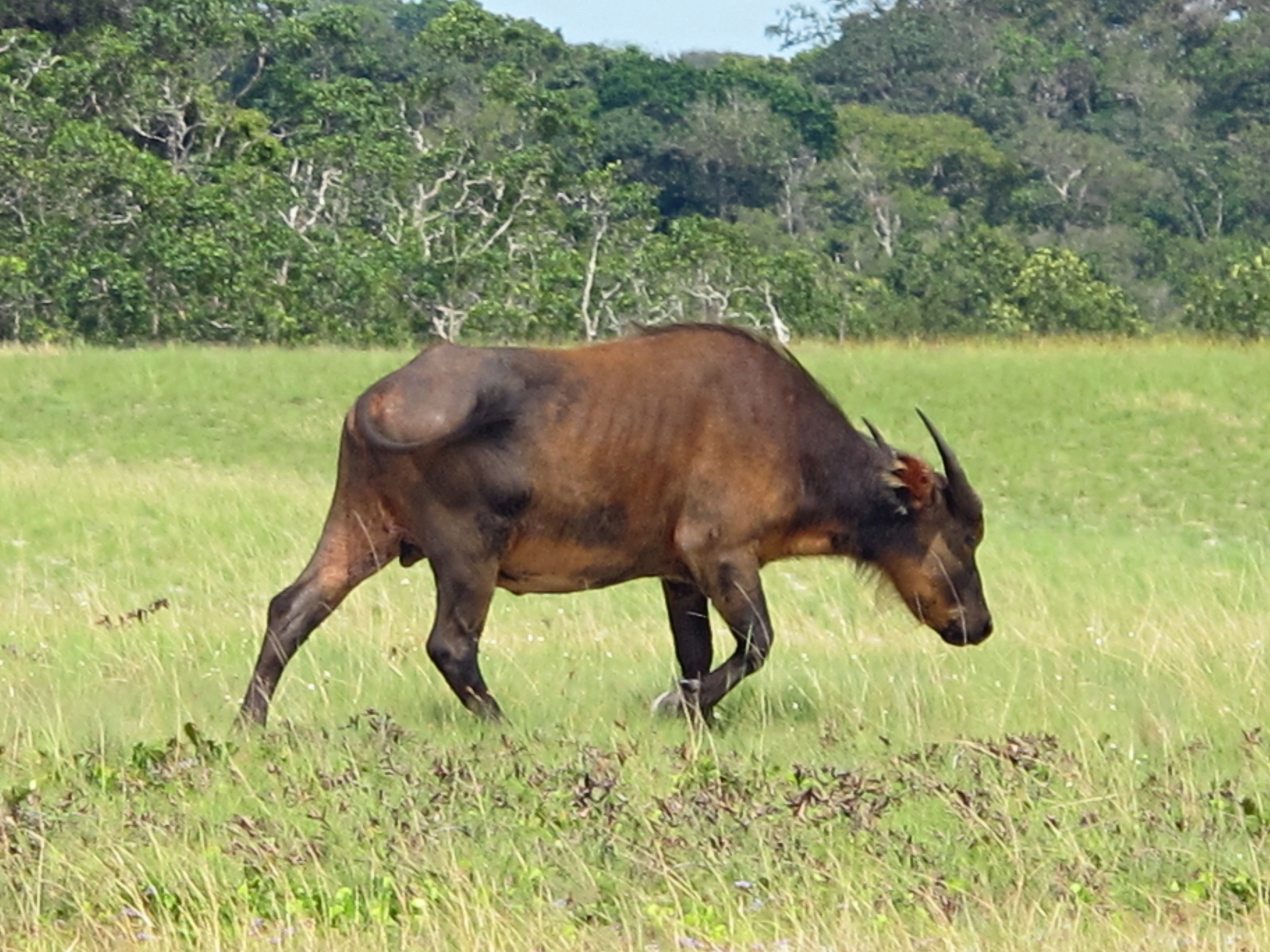
African forest buffalo

This park is home to many of the wild animals characteristic of the surrounding Gabonese forests, such as common chimpanzees, gorillas, black colobus, mandrills, forest buffaloes and red river hogs. African elephants are present. It has been designated an Important Bird Area (IBA) by BirdLife International because it supports significant populations of many bird species.
