= Kwasio people =

Bantu ethnic group of Equatorial Guinea

The Bujeba or Kwasio people are an African ethnic group, members of the Bantu group, who are indigenous to Equatorial Guinea. Their indigenous language is Bujeba. Today Bujebas inhabit Northern and Southern Bata, and South of Rio Benito. The ethnic group has decreased in number, as most have assimilated into the Fang ethnic group due to their strong influence in recent decades. They are referred to as Ndowe or "Playeros" (Beach People in Spanish), one of several peoples on the Rio Muni coast.
