= Kwasio language =

Bantu language of southern Cameroon and Equatorial Guinea

Kwasio
- Ngumba, Kola
- Native to: Cameroon, Equatorial Guinea
- Region: along and near the coast at the border between Cameroon and Equatorial Guinea
- Ethnicity: Kwasio, Gyele Pygmies
- Native speakers: (26,000 cited 1982–2012)
- Language family: Niger–Congo?: Atlantic–Congo; Benue–Congo; Bantu (Zone A); Makaa–Njem + Kako (A.80–90); Mvumboic; Kwasio
- Dialects: Bujeba; Kwasio; Mvumbo; Mabi; Gyele; Kola

Language codes
- ISO 639-3: Either: nmg – Kwasio–Mvumbo gyi – Gyele–Kola
- Glottolog: mvum1239
- Guthrie code: A.81,801
- ELP: Gyele

Map of the Gyeli/Kwasio area in Cameroon (dots) with neighbouring languages/peoples

The Kwasio language, also known as Ngumba / Mvumbo, Bujeba, and Gyele / Kola, is a language of Cameroon, spoken in the south along the coast and at the border with Equatorial Guinea by some 70,000 members of the Ngumba, Kwasio, Gyele and Mabi peoples. Many authors view Kwasio and the Gyele/Kola language as distinct. In the Ethnologue, the languages therefore receive different codes: Kwasio has the ISO 639-3 code nmg, while Gyele has the code gyi. The Kwasio, Ngumba, and Mabi are village farmers; the Gyele (also known as the Kola or Koya) are nomadic Pygmy hunter-gatherers living in the rain forest. The Bagyeli (the name the speakers of the language have given themselves) are mostly forager and hunters. They use dogs, traps, machetes, spears, and nets to hunt and catch animals for food. Deforestation has affected their subsistence, and they have recently begun to benefit from selling baskets and meat to tourists.

== Dialects ==
Dialects are Kwasio (also known as Kwassio, Bisio), Mvumbo (also known as Ngumba, Ngoumba, Mgoumba, Mekuk), and Mabi (Mabea).

The Gyele speak the subdialects of Mvumbo and Gyele in the north Giele, Gieli, Gyeli, Bagiele, Bagyele (Bagyɛlɛ), Bagielli, Bajele, Bajeli, Bogyel, Bogyeli, Bondjiel.

In the south, the Gyele speak Kola, also known as Koya, in the south, also spelled as Likoya, Bako, Bakola, Bakuele, also Bekoe. The local derogatory term for pygmies, Babinga, is also used.

In Equatorial Guinea, the Bujeba dialect is spoken around Southern Bata and South of Rio Benito.

Glottolog adds Shiwa.

=== ALCAM (2012) ===
==== Non-Pygmy varieties ====
According to ALCAM (2012), the non-Pygmy Kwasio people speak two language varieties, Mvumbo and Mabi, which have moderate mutual intelligibility. They are spoken in Océan Department, Southern Region. The Bisio group of Kwasio people live in Equatorial Guinea, as well as in Gabon where they are known under the ethnonym Shiwo.

Kwasio is geographically the most western of the languages of the A80-A90 Bantu linguistic continuum. It is closely related to Mbwa (Békol) and Bajwe'e, and more distantly to Méka and Béti.

Mabi, the more western dialect, is spoken on the Atlantic coast around Kribi, among Batanga-speaking populations.

Mvumbo is spoken immediately to the east, along the road from Kribi to Lolodorf, in the communes of these two towns, where speakers are mixed mainly with Fang and Ewondo (Beti Fang)-speaking populations.

==== Pygmy varieties ====
According to ALCAM (2012), Gyáli and Kola are very close to each other and coexist in the same camps and settlements. On the other hand, they are not in contact with the Baka, the eastern Pygmies.

There are also close linguistic relationships between Bagyáli and the Meka group, although the non-Pygmy Mabi and Mvumbo peoples do not typically like to admit that their language, Kwasio, is closely related to the Pygmy language varieties.

The Bagyáli traditionally inhabit the forests of Océan Department (Southern Region), around Kribi, Bipindi and Lolodorf (in the communes of Kribi, Akom II, Bipindi, and Lolodorf), and are estimated at 4,250 people.

The Bagyáli are also found in Equatorial Guinea.

== Phonology ==
=== Consonants ===
Consonants in the Mvùmbò dialect
		Labial	Alveolar	Palatal	Velar	Glottal
Nasal		m	n	ɲ	ŋ	
Plosive	voiceless	p	t		k	(ʔ)
Plosive	voiced	b	d		ɡ	
Plosive	prenasal vd.	ᵐb	ⁿd		ᵑɡ	
Plosive	prenasal vl.				ᵑk	
Plosive	implosive	(ɓ)				
Affricate	voiceless	p͡f	t͡s	t͡ʃ		
Affricate	voiced	b͡v	d͡z	d͡ʒ		
Fricative	voiceless	f	s		(x)	(h)
Fricative	voiced	v	z			
Fricative	prenasal	ᶬv	ⁿz			
Approximant		ɥ	l	j	w	

- Sounds /b, d, ɡ/ may be lenited as [β, r, ɣ] in intervocalic positions
- /b, k/ may be heard as sounds [ɓ, x] in free variation among speakers.

Consonants in the Gyeli dialect
		Labial	Alveolar	Palatal	Velar	Glottal
Nasal		m	n	ɲ	(ŋ)	
Plosive	voiceless	p	t		k	ʔ
Plosive	voiced	b	d		ɡ	
Plosive	prenasal vl.	ᵐp	ⁿt		ᵑk	
Plosive	prenasal vd.	ᵐb	ⁿd		ᵑɡ	
Plosive	implosive	(ɓ)	(ɗ)			
Affricate	voiceless	p͡f	(t͡s)	t͡ʃ	(k͡p)	
Affricate	voiced	b͡v	(d͡z)	d͡ʒ		
Affricate	prenasal vl.		(ⁿt͡s)	ᶮt͡ʃ		
Affricate	prenasal vd.	ᶬb͡v	(ⁿd͡z)	ᶮd͡ʒ	(ᵑᵐɡ͡b)	
Fricative	voiceless	f	s			
Fricative	voiced	v	z			
Fricative	prenasal vl.	ᶬf	ⁿs			
Fricative	prenasal vd.	ᶬv	ⁿz			
Approximant			l	j	w	

- Other consonant sounds may also occur as palatalized /pʲ, dʲ, kʲ, ɡʲ/, or labialized /pʷ, bʷ, sʷ, kʷ, ɡʷ/.
- Sounds /b, d, ɡ/ may be lenited as [β, ɾ, ɣ] in intervocalic positions
- Sounds /t͡ʃ, d͡ʒ, ᶮt͡ʃ, ᶮd͡ʒ/ are sometimes realized as [t͡s, d͡z, ⁿt͡s, ⁿd͡z] in free variation among speakers.
- /b, d/ may also be heard as implosive sounds [ɓ, ɗ] in free variation among speakers.
- [ŋ] occurs as a general allophone of /n/, especially when preceding velar consonants.
- Sounds [k͡p, ᵑᵐɡ͡b] are only heard from loanwords.
- Tonal morpheme H is responsible for "object linking" (indicating what and where an object is in a sentence)

=== Vowels ===
Vowels in the Mvùmbò dialect
	Front		Central	Back
Close	i	y		u
Close-mid	e			o
Open-mid	ɛ			ɔ
Open			a	

- Sounds /e, ɛ/ may have allophones of [ø, œ] in syllable initial position.
- Lengthened sounds include /iː, ɛː, aː, oː, uː/.

Vowels in the Gyeli dialect
	Front	Central	Back
Close	i		u
Close-mid	e		o
Open-mid	ɛ		ɔ
Open		a	

- Lengthened sounds include /iː, eː, ɛː, aː, ɔː, oː, uː/.
- Nasal vowels include /ĩ, ẽ, ɛ̃, ã, ɔ̃, õ, ũ/.

Diphthongs in Gyeli/Kwasia are rare and typically only occur in monosyllabic stems of nouns and verbs. There are only 4 diphthongs in the language: /ua/, /uɔ/, /iɛ/, and /ɔa/. These vowels were most likely two separate syllables with a consonant in between them acting as the onset to the second syllable. Through grammaticalization these two syllables likely merged to created the diphthongs used in the language today.

== Features ==
Like the other Niger-Congo languages of Cameroon, Kwasio is a tonal language.

As a Bantu language, it has noun class system. The Kwasio noun class system is somewhat reduced, having retained only 6 genders (a gender being a pairing of a singular and a plural noun class).

== Sociolinguistic Context ==
Gyeli speakers have little to no prestige with outsiders, and the Gyeli community is becoming largely bilingual. Though the secondary language does not appear to be universal for all Gyeli speakers, the invasion and discrimination they face from other communities promotes shame of the Gyeli language and thus pushes for further assimilation. Since they are forced to take undesirable land, they are surrounded by other Bantu farmer communities that do not speak the Gyeli language, and since the Bagyeli don’t generally ascribe to farming for their food as their Bantu neighbors do, they are considered backwards, less-intelligent neighbors who need to succumb to the way the peoples around them live. With the combination of the ever-increasing invasion of the forests from deforestation, infrastructure, and the oil pipeline, and the pressure from the Bantu farmers, the Gyeli language has all but disappeared from outside the Gyeli community. Many Gyeli speakers admit to adopting this discrimination towards their own language and ways, preferring to speak Kwasio or Busu with outsiders rather than their native Gyeli tongue. The Bagyeli have little to no power in their own community or others because they are not politically organized and therefore cannot change their situation.

== Syntax ==
=== Word Order ===
Every language orders their subject, object, and verb words within a sentence differently. For the Kwasio/Gyeli language, the word order is SVO (S stands for Subject, V stands for Verb, and O stands for Object).

Within these roles there are other roles that words can have, such as Patient, Theme, and Recipient. The Patient is generally the Object, thus following the word order, the Patient will generally follow the Verb. Themes and Recipients are different types of Patients found within a sentence, and generally one or the other follow the same pattern of the Patient. However, in Kwasio/Gyeli, the indexation that would indicate which element (Theme or Recipient) is more like P, the indexation doesn't show any preference to either one, therefore the indexation is neutral.

== Morphology ==
=== Agreement Affixes ===
Kwasio/Gyeli have many different agreement affixes used but not all of them are segmental. Some of their morphemes are tonal and show object linking. This is called the H-tone and is used to mark an object in a sentence. This can only be done in toneless CV-constructions that are prefixes for nouns. When there are multiple objects in a sentence, only the object closest to the verb gets marked with this morpheme.

=== Causatives ===
In Kwasio/Gyeli the causative voice construction can be formed in two ways, either using affixation on the verb or with a direct verb that has the causative meaning that is accompanied by a complenentizer morpheme to give the causative meaning.

An example of affixation on the verb is the concept of 'teach' in Gyeli. To express this concept, the language would add the suffix '-ɛsɛ' onto the root word for 'learn' which is 'gyik' to make the word 'gyikɛse' which would then have the literal meaning, 'make learn'

An example of the a direct verb accompanied by a complementize morpheme is the sentence, 'I make you laugh' which would translate to 'mɛ nzíí sâ nâ wɛ dyɔ.'.

'mɛ-H nzíí-H sâ nâ wɛ-H dyɔ.'.

1SG-PRS PROG-R make COMP 2SG-PRS laugh

'I make you laugh.'

What is important in this sentence are the two words sâ and nâ. 'Sâ' translates to 'make' which has the causative meaning and 'nâ' is a free morpheme that is a complenentizer to add causative meaning.

=== Presentational Possession ===
There are many ways that languages illustrate presentational possession, which means the possessum (can be thing being possessed) is presented as a new referent. Kwasio/Gyeli uses the adnominal possessive to express the presentational possession through the bɛ̀ and nà morphemes.

=== Conjunction ===
In Kwasio/Gyeli conjunction between clauses is expressed using the 'nà' morpheme. The morpheme is placed in between clauses. Below is an example.

yà lɔ fúálá ná mɛ lɔ láwɔ

ya-H lɔ fúálá ná mɛ lɔ láwɔ

1PL-PRS RETRO end CONJ 1SG RETRO talk

'We just finished and I just spoke.'

== See also ==
The term Bakola is also used for the pygmies of the northern Congo–Gabon border region, which speak the Ngom language.
