= Nick du Toit =

South African arms dealer

Servaas Nicolaas "Nick" du Toit is a former South African arms dealer, former mercenary and former colonel of 32 Battalion and the 5th Reconnaissance Commando. He was implicated in the plot to overthrow Teodoro Obiang of Equatorial Guinea.

== Failed coup and aftermath ==
Du Toit went on trial in Malabo along with 18 other men accused of being the advance party for 70 other mercenaries. All were found guilty and although the prosecution asked for the death penalty, du Toit received a 34-year sentence (to be served in Malabo's Black Beach prison).

His purported role was to supply the mercenaries with arms including AK-47s, RPGs, PK machine guns and mortars, and to secure the control tower at the Malabo airport and change the frequency to establish communication with the incoming plane from Zimbabwe carrying more mercenaries. After his capture, he appeared on South African television announcing the failure of the coup and the names of co-conspirators. Du Toit served five years and eight months of a 34-year sentence in a cell measuring 150 cm x 210 cm, had been tortured, beaten, starved and kept for much of the time in solitary confinement. They were reportedly burned with cigarettes, beaten with rifle butts, hung upside down and beaten, contracted malaria multiple times and was refused treatment, among many tortures endures by the 18 men.

Simon Mann had bribed the prison guards to fetch food from the hotel across the street, claiming it was good enough for his co-conspirators but not for him, he even had a treadmill installed in his prison cell while du Toit and the others were handcuffed to the beds and beaten if they tried to move. Du Toit and three others were given presidential pardons by Equatorial Guinea's dictator ruler, President Obiang, on 3 November 2009, and was released, along with Sergio Cardoso, Jose Sundays, and George Alerson (1958-2015). Additionally, Simon Mann was also released and was back in England by 6 November 2009.

Du Toit subsequently retired as a career soldier and began working in vehicle sales in Yemen.

== See also ==
- Simon Mann
- Mark Thatcher

== Literature ==
- James Brabazon: My Friend the Mercenary, Grove Press (March 22, 2011), ISBN 978-0802119759 Biography of Nick du Toit.
