= Simon Mann =

British Army officer and mercenary (1952–2025)

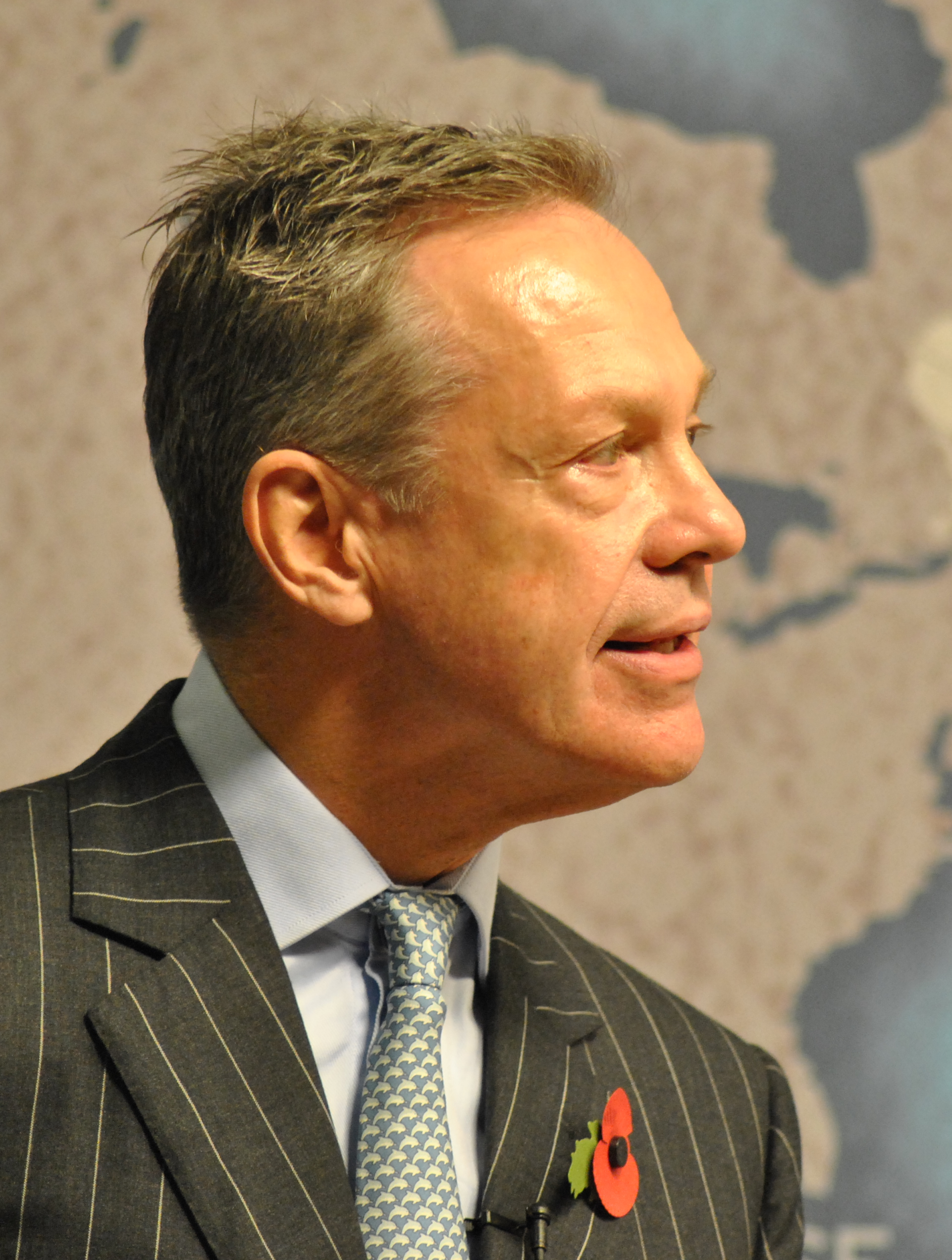
- Mann in 2011
- Born: 26 June 1952; Aldershot, England
- Died: 8 May 2025 (aged 72); London, England
- Alma mater: Eton College; Royal Military Academy Sandhurst
- Relatives: George Mann (father); Frank Mann (grandfather)
- Military career
- Allegiance: United Kingdom
- Branch: British Army
- Years of service: 1972–1985; 1991–1994
- Rank: Captain
- Service number: 494441
- Units: Scots Guards; 22 Special Air Service
- Known for: Executive Outcomes; Sandline International
- Conflicts: The Troubles; Persian Gulf War; Working as a mercenary: Angolan Civil War; Bougainville Uprising; Sierra Leone Civil War; Equatorial Guinea coup attempt

Simon Francis Mann (26 June 1952 – 8 May 2025) was a British officer in the Special Air Service (SAS), and later a mercenary. He trained to be an officer at Sandhurst and was commissioned into the Scots Guards. He later became a member of the SAS, and on leaving the military, he co-founded Sandline International with fellow ex-Scots Guards colonel Tim Spicer in 1996. Sandline operated mostly in Angola and Sierra Leone, but public protests against a contract with the government of Papua New Guinea led to the resignation of the Prime Minister of Papua New Guinea, in what became known as the Sandline affair.

On 7 March 2004, Mann is alleged to have led the 2004 Equatorial Guinea coup attempt. He was arrested by the Zimbabwe Republic Police at Harare International Airport along with 64 other mercenaries, later describing himself as the "manager, not the architect" of the coup. He eventually served three years of a four-year prison sentence in Zimbabwe before being extradited to Equatorial Guinea, where he served less than two years of a 34 1/3-year sentence before being pardoned on humanitarian grounds.

== Early life ==
Simon Mann was born in Aldershot, Hampshire, on 26 June 1952. His father, George, captained the England cricket team in the late 1940s and was an heir to a stake in the Watney Mann brewing empire that closed in 1979, having been acquired by Grand Metropolitan (which, in 1997, became Diageo on its merger with Guinness). His mother, Margaret, was South African.

== Military career ==
After leaving Eton College where he played the bagpipes much to the annoyance of his fellow pupils, Mann trained to be an officer at Sandhurst and was commissioned into the Scots Guards on 16 December 1972. By 1976, he held the rank of Lieutenant. He later became a member of the SAS and served in Cyprus, Germany, Norway and Northern Ireland before leaving the forces in 1981. He volunteered as a reservist for the Gulf War.

== Post-military career ==
=== Executive Outcomes ===
Mann then entered the field of computer security; however, his interest in this industry lapsed when he returned from his service in the Gulf and he entered the oil industry to work with Tony Buckingham. Buckingham also had a military background and had been a diver in the North Sea oil industry before joining a Canadian oil firm. In 1993, UNITA rebels in Angola seized the port of Soyo, and closed its oil installations. The Angolan government under José Eduardo dos Santos sought mercenaries to seize back the port and asked for assistance from Buckingham who had by now formed his own company.

=== Sandline International ===
Mann went on to establish Sandline International with fellow ex-Scots Guards colonel Tim Spicer in 1996. The company operated mostly in Angola and Sierra Leone, but in 1997 Sandline received a commission from the government of Papua New Guinea to suppress a rebellion on the island of Bougainville and the company came to international prominence, but received much negative publicity following the Sandline affair. Sandline International announced the closure of the company's operations on 16 April 2004. In an interview on The Today programme, Mann indicated that the operations in Angola had netted more than £10 million.

== Equatorial Guinean coup attempt ==
On 7 March 2004, Mann and 69 others were arrested in Zimbabwe when their Boeing 727 was seized by security forces during a stop-off at Harare's airport to be loaded with £100,000 worth of weapons and equipment. The men were charged with violating the country's immigration, firearms and security laws and later accused of engaging in an attempt to stage a coup d'état in Equatorial Guinea. Meanwhile, fourteen suspected mercenaries, one of whom later died in prison, were detained in Equatorial Guinea in connection with the alleged plot. Mann and the others claimed that they were not on their way to Equatorial Guinea but were in fact flying to the Democratic Republic of Congo to provide security for diamond mines. Mann and his colleagues were put on trial in Zimbabwe, and, on 27 August, Mann was found guilty of attempting to buy arms for an alleged coup plot and sentenced to seven years’ imprisonment. Sixty-six of the others were acquitted.

On 25 August 2004, Sir Mark Thatcher, son of former British Prime Minister Margaret Thatcher, was arrested at his home in Cape Town, South Africa. He eventually pleaded guilty (under a plea bargain) to negligently supplying financial assistance for the plot. The 14 men in the mercenary advance guard that were caught in Equatorial Guinea were sentenced to jail for 34 years.

Among the advance guard was Nick du Toit who claimed that he had been introduced to Thatcher by Mann. Investigations later revealed in Mann's holdings' financial records that large transfers of money were made to du Toit, as well as approximately US$2 million coming in from an unknown and untraceable source. On 10 September, Mann was sentenced to seven years in jail. His compatriots received one-year sentences for violating immigration laws and their two pilots got 16 months. The group's Boeing 727 was seized, as well as the US$180,000 that was found on board the plane.

=== Exposure ===
A friend of Mann, Nigel Morgan, who had ties to the South African Secret Service, was alleged to have betrayed his knowledge of the plot to the South African authorities. The journalist Adam Roberts has argued that Morgan was in the unusual situation of being both a supporter of the coup and also an agent for the government, and that Mann knew Morgan was acting as an informant, but as a way of sounding out whether or not the South African government would care.

Academic R. W. Johnson, on the other hand, argued that only the 'shambolic state of the South African intelligence services' explains why an aborted 19 February attempt by Mann—which fell apart when a plane set to meet them in Zambia suffered a bird strike—was allowed to get off the ground in Polokwane Airport. He emphasises that Morgan had personal and professional ties to Johann Smith, a South African Special Forces veteran and security adviser to President Teodoro Obiang Nguema, and most likely alerted President Thabo Mbeki after the failed first attempt, who in turn tipped off the government of Robert Mugabe.

Peter Fabricius, writing in the South African Journal of International Affairs, suggested that then President of South Africa, Thabo Mbeki, once informed of Mann's plan, allowed the plotters to take off and then be caught on the tarmac in Zimbabwe, in order to make a public example of the Wonga coup and deter further mercenary activity.

=== Charges dropped and extradition ===
On 23 February 2007, charges were dropped against Mann and the other alleged conspirators in South Africa. Mann remained in Zimbabwe, where he was convicted of charges from the same incident. On 2 May 2007, a Zimbabwe court ruled that Mann should be extradited to Equatorial Guinea to face charges, although the Zimbabweans promised that he would not face the death penalty. His extradition was described as the "oil for Mann" deal, in reference to the large amounts of oil that Mugabe managed to secure from Equatorial Guinea. Mann lost his last appeal against the decision to extradite him. In a last-ditch effort on 30 January 2008, Mann tried to appeal the judgment to the Zimbabwean Supreme Court. The following day, Mann was deported to Equatorial Guinea in secret, leading to claims by his lawyers that the extradition was hastened to defeat the possibility of appeal to the Supreme Court. In Equatorial Guinea Mann was incarcerated in Black Beach Prison, one of Africa's most notorious prisons and often viewed as synonymous with brutality.

=== Response by UK Parliamentarians ===
Concern for Mann's plight was raised in the UK Parliament in the year of his arrest in Zimbabwe by three Conservative Members of Parliament. During the two years after the government of Equatorial Guinea applied for his extradition, three further Conservative Party MPs submitted written questions.

The sudden extradition drew the greatest response. Julian Lewis said in Parliament:

My constituent, Mr Simon Mann, has completed his jail sentence in Zimbabwe but has been transferred by the Mugabe regime to a potentially terrible fate in Equatorial Guinea, despite the fact that his appeals processes have not been completed and despite the assurances given to the British ambassador to Zimbabwe that would not happen. May we have a statement as soon as possible on the Floor of the House from the Foreign Secretary about what action is going to be taken? Quiet diplomacy has failed and we now have to save Mr Mann, whatever he has or has not done, from torture and a horrible death in a terrible situation.

That position was supported by three other Conservative MPs during the debate. Written questions were submitted by a fourth.

There was a request that the United States administration, which had access to Simon Mann in Black Beach Prison on 6 February 2008, exert its influence "to secure [his] safe return". UK officials were granted access to him on 12 February 2008. Labour and other parties expressed little concern about Mann or the others. The only non-Conservative Party MP to submit a question in Parliament about him was Vince Cable, although an Early Day Motion about his treatment in prison received some cross-party support.

On 8 March 2008, Channel 4 in the UK won a legal battle to broadcast an interview with Mann in which he named British political figures, including Ministers, alleged to have given tacit approval to the coup plot. In testimony, he spoke frankly about the events leading to the botched attempt to topple Equatorial Guinea's president.

Despite their charges being unrelated, Mann was tried alongside six Progress Party of Equatorial Guinea activists being held on weapons charges, including opposition leader Severo Moto's former secretary Gerardo Angüe Mangue. On 7 July 2008, Mann was sentenced by an Equatoguinean court to more than 34 years in prison.

=== Release ===
On 2 November 2009, he was given "a complete pardon on humanitarian grounds" by President Obiang. He returned to England and lived in New Forest, Hampshire.

=== Release of emails and unpublished memoirs ===
In 2024, Mann provided The Daily Telegraph with access to emails and unpublished memoirs providing additional information. On the 20th anniversary of the coup attempt, the newspaper published an article on the coup.

== In popular media ==
- In 2002, Mann played Lieutenant-Colonel Derek Wilford of the Parachute Regiment for Granada Television's Bloody Sunday, a dramatisation by Paul Greengrass of the events of Bloody Sunday.
- The alleged coup planned for Equatorial Guinea is the subject of the film Coup!, written by John Fortune. Mann is played by Jared Harris, with Robert Bathurst as Mark Thatcher. It was broadcast on BBC Two on 30 June 2006 and on ABC in Australia on 21 January 2008.
- Mann was interviewed from prison in the documentary Once Upon a Coup, which aired on PBS's Wide Angle in August 2009.
- On 8 April 2025, Mann was interviewed on the Caribbean Rhythms with Bronze Age Pervert podcast. This was his last known interview prior to his death one month later.

== Memoirs ==
Mann's memoir, Cry Havoc, was published in 2011, to mixed reviews.

== Personal life and death ==
Mann was married three times and had nine children. His third wife was Amanda Freedman, and they were preparing to divorce at the time of his death.

Mann died of a heart attack at his home in London, on 8 May 2025, at the age of 72.
