= Demographics of Equatorial Guinea =

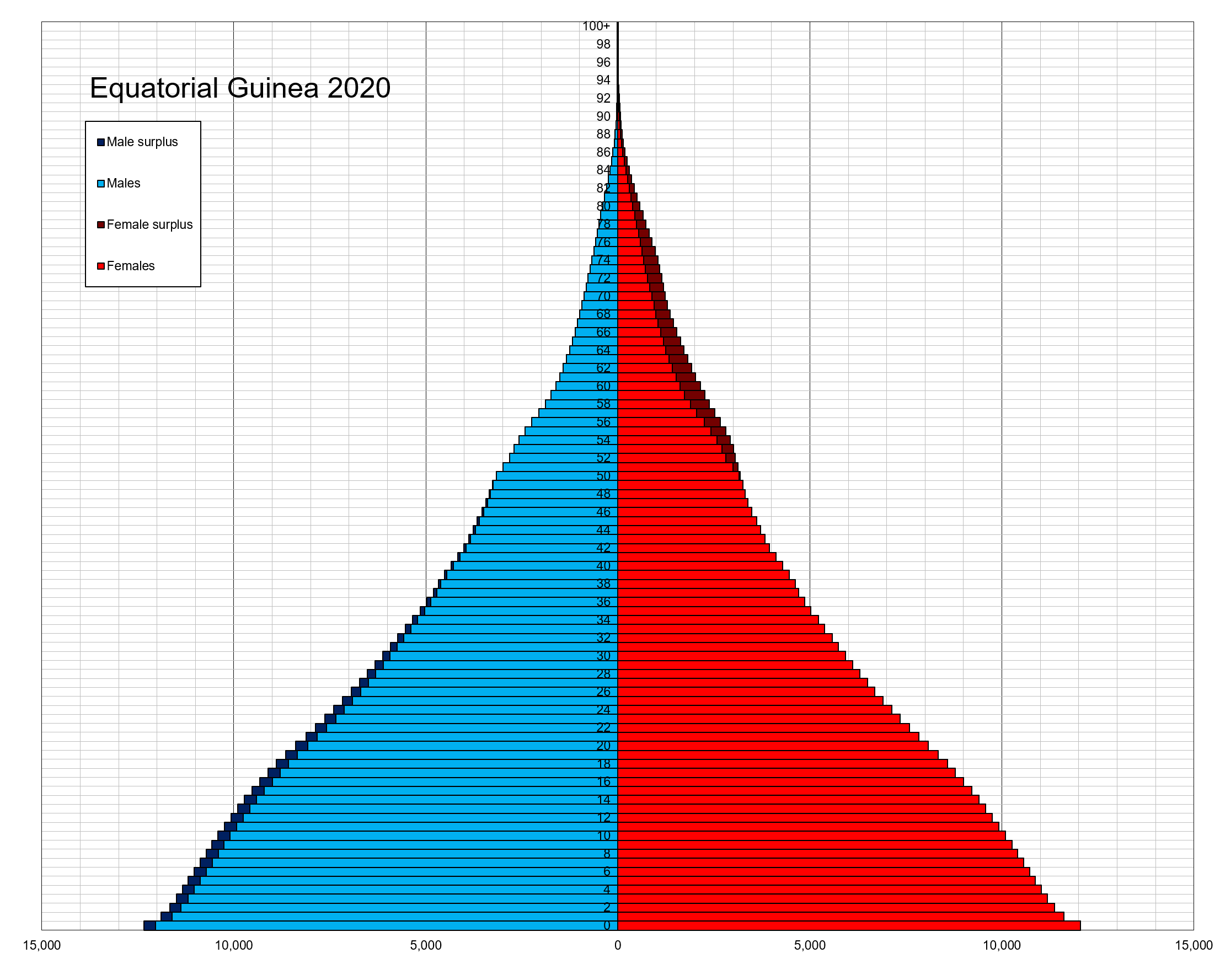
- Population pyramid of the Equatorial Guinea in 2020
- Population: 1,679,172 (2022 est.)
- Growth rate: 3.5% (2022 est.)
- Birth rate: 29.6 births/1,000 population (2025 est.)
- Death rate: 7.8 deaths/1,000 population (2025 est.)
- Life expectancy: 63.7 years
  - male: 61.44 years
  - female: 66.03 years
- Fertility rate: 4.04 children born/woman (2025 est.)
- Infant mortality: 78.33 deaths/1,000 live births
- Net migration rate: 13.96 migrant(s)/1,000 population (2022 est.)
- Immigrant share: 13.2% (2024)

Age structure
- 0–14 years: 38.73%
- 65 and over: 3.92%

Sex ratio
- Total: 1.15 male(s)/female (2022 est.)
- At birth: 1.03 male(s)/female
- Under 15: 1.08 male(s)/female
- 65 and over: 0.87 male(s)/female

Nationality
- Nationality: Equatorial Guinean
- Major ethnic: Fang (85.7%)

Language
- Official: Spanish

Evolution of the Equatoguinean population between 1960 and 2017. Population data in hundreds of thousands of inhabitants.

Demographic features of the population of Equatorial Guinea include population density, ethnicity, education level, health of the populace, economic status, religious affiliations and other aspects of the population.

== Population ==
Population, fertility rate and net reproduction rate, United Nations estimates

According to the United Nations, the total population was 1,892,516 in 2024 (mid-year estimate), compared to only 226,563 in 1950. In 2024 the proportion of children below the age of 15 was approximately 37.3%, 59.0% were between 15 and 64 years of age, while 3.7% were 65 years or older.

Year	Total population	Population aged 0–14 (%)	Population aged 15–64 (%)	Population aged 65+ (%)
1950	226,563	34.2	60.1	5.6
1951	230,615	—	—	—
1952	234,684	—	—	—
1953	238,796	—	—	—
1954	242,975	—	—	—
1955	247,215	35.7	59.0	5.3
1956	251,528	—	—	—
1957	255,915	—	—	—
1958	260,386	—	—	—
1959	264,961	—	—	—
1960	269,807	37.0	57.9	5.0
1961	274,932	—	—	—
1962	280,345	—	—	—
1963	286,047	—	—	—
1964	292,042	—	—	—
1965	298,238	38.3	56.9	4.8
1966	304,721	—	—	—
1967	311,520	—	—	—
1968	318,655	—	—	—
1969	320,000	—	—	—
1970	320,803	38.7	56.7	4.6
1971	318,000	—	—	—
1972	312,000	—	—	—
1973	305,000	—	—	—
1974	296,000	—	—	—
1975	287,901	44.8	49.8	5.4
1976	280,000	—	—	—
1977	275,000	—	—	—
1978	278,000	—	—	—
1979	283,000	—	—	—
1980	288,644	43.7	50.3	6.0
1981	302,000	—	—	—
1982	320,000	—	—	—
1983	342,000	—	—	—
1984	363,000	—	—	—
1985	385,547	34.7	60.4	4.9
1986	405,000	—	—	—
1987	425,000	—	—	—
1988	442,000	—	—	—
1989	458,000	—	—	—
1990	474,274	37.7	57.8	4.5
1991	492,000	—	—	—
1992	511,000	—	—	—
1993	530,000	—	—	—
1994	550,000	—	—	—
1995	571,264	41.9	54.1	4.1
1996	595,000	—	—	—
1997	622,000	—	—	—
1998	651,000	—	—	—
1999	677,000	—	—	—
2000	703,279	42.6	53.8	3.7
2001	749,836	—	—	—
2002	797,957	—	—	—
2003	847,862	—	—	—
2004	899,917	—	—	—
2005	947,367	40.5	56.2	3.2
2006	990,343	—	—	—
2007	1,036,044	—	—	—
2008	1,084,530	—	—	—
2009	1,135,673	—	—	—
2010	1,189,085	39.2	57.9	2.9
2011	1,241,835	—	—	—
2012	1,293,483	—	—	—
2013	1,346,218	—	—	—
2014	1,399,828	—	—	—
2015	1,453,923	38.3	58.0	3.7
2016	1,508,186	—	—	—
2017	1,562,396	—	—	—
2018	1,616,422	—	—	—
2019	1,670,177	—	—	—
2020	1,716,468	37.9	58.3	3.8
2021	1,758,786	—	—	—
2022	1,803,545	—	—	—
2023	1,847,549	37.3	58.9	3.8
2024	1,892,516	37.3	59.0	3.7
2025	1,938,431	37.1	59.1	3.8

Population by sex and age group (mid-year 2024 estimates):

Age group	Male	Female	Total	%
Total	997,750	894,770	1,892,520	100
0–4	129,184	126,559	255,743	13.51
5–9	119,278	117,267	236,546	12.50
10–14	107,433	105,912	213,345	11.27
15–19	91,198	89,448	180,645	9.55
20–24	76,609	70,028	146,637	7.75
25–29	72,026	63,393	135,419	7.16
30–34	76,600	63,599	140,198	7.41
35–39	78,929	59,550	138,478	7.32
40–44	65,160	46,074	111,234	5.88
45–49	52,078	36,983	89,061	4.71
50–54	41,333	30,998	72,331	3.82
55–59	31,175	26,288	57,462	3.04
60–64	23,741	21,881	45,622	2.41
65–69	15,014	15,470	30,483	1.61
70–74	9,722	10,973	20,695	1.09
75–79	4,895	5,633	10,527	0.56
80–84	2,276	3,140	5,417	0.29
85–89	835	1,200	2,035	0.11
90–94	202	314	515	0.03
95–99	49	54	102	0.01
100+	13	6	19	0.00
Age group	Male	Female	Total	Percent
0–14	355,895	349,738	705,634	37.3
15–64	608,849	508,242	1,117,091	59.0
65+	33,006	36,790	69,796	3.7

Year	Live births	Deaths	Natural change	CBR*	CDR*	NC*	TFR*
1950	9,638	5,593	4,045	42.5	24.7	17.9	5.68
1951	9,763	5,709	4,054	42.3	24.5	17.8	5.67
1952	9,884	5,793	4,091	42.1	24.4	17.7	5.67
1953	10,003	5,860	4,143	41.9	24.3	17.6	5.66
1954	10,122	5,916	4,206	41.7	24.2	17.5	5.66
1955	10,241	5,966	4,275	41.4	24.1	17.3	5.66
1956	10,360	6,010	4,350	41.2	24.0	17.2	5.65
1957	10,482	6,051	4,431	41.0	23.9	17.1	5.65
1958	10,608	6,090	4,518	40.7	23.8	17.0	5.65
1959	10,742	6,128	4,614	40.5	23.7	16.9	5.65
1960	10,893	6,167	4,726	40.4	22.9	17.5	5.65
1961	11,068	6,210	4,858	40.3	22.7	17.6	5.66
1962	11,273	6,260	5,013	40.2	22.5	17.7	5.67
1963	11,509	6,317	5,185	40.2	22.3	18.0	5.69
1964	11,776	6,382	5,394	40.3	22.1	18.2	5.71
1965	12,074	6,455	5,619	40.5	21.6	18.8	5.73
1966	12,403	6,535	5,868	40.7	21.5	19.2	5.76
1967	12,760	6,624	6,136	40.9	21.3	19.6	5.78
1968	13,138	6,720	6,418	41.2	21.1	20.1	5.79
1969	13,430	10,836	2,594	41.5	33.5	8.0	5.80
1970	13,524	10,809	2,715	42.2	33.7	8.5	5.81
1971	13,473	8,650	4,823	42.5	27.3	15.2	5.81
1972	13,303	6,731	6,572	42.8	21.6	21.1	5.81
1973	13,036	6,527	6,509	42.9	21.5	21.4	5.80
1974	12,731	7,033	5,698	43.0	23.8	19.3	5.80
1975	12,424	7,844	4,580	43.2	27.2	15.9	5.79
1976	12,124	9,673	2,451	43.0	34.3	8.7	5.79
1977	11,932	6,381	5,551	42.8	22.9	19.9	5.80
1978	11,899	6,264	5,635	42.7	22.5	20.2	5.80
1979	12,003	6,216	5,787	42.6	22.1	20.6	5.82
1980	12,329	5,186	7,143	42.7	18.0	24.7	5.84
1981	12,906	5,333	7,573	43.3	17.9	25.4	5.86
1982	13,718	5,536	8,182	44.2	17.8	26.4	5.88
1983	14,695	5,808	8,887	45.2	17.9	27.3	5.90
1984	16,236	6,159	10,077	46.5	17.6	28.9	5.93
1985	17,643	6,464	11,179	45.8	16.8	29.0	5.95
1986	18,829	6,768	12,061	46.2	16.6	29.6	5.96
1987	19,777	7,049	12,728	46.4	16.5	29.9	5.97
1988	20,541	7,274	13,267	46.3	16.4	29.9	5.98
1989	21,220	7,495	13,725	46.2	16.3	29.9	5.99
1990	21,861	7,704	14,157	46.1	16.2	29.9	5.99
1991	22,489	7,907	14,582	45.7	16.1	29.6	5.99
1992	23,125	8,115	15,010	45.3	15.9	29.4	5.98
1993	23,781	8,322	15,459	44.9	15.7	29.2	5.98
1994	24,468	8,530	15,938	44.4	15.5	28.9	5.98
1995	25,072	8,726	16,346	43.9	15.3	28.6	5.97
1996	25,712	8,910	16,802	43.3	15.0	28.3	5.96
1997	26,391	9,086	17,305	42.7	14.7	28.0	5.94
1998	27,114	9,259	17,855	42.1	14.4	27.7	5.91
1999	27,878	9,413	18,465	41.5	14.0	27.5	5.88
2000	28,690	9,559	19,131	40.8	13.6	27.2	5.83
2001	30,313	9,936	20,377	40.5	13.3	27.2	5.79
2002	32,057	10,313	21,744	40.3	13.0	27.3	5.73
2003	33,907	10,738	23,169	40.1	12.7	27.4	5.68
2004	35,845	11,179	24,666	40.0	12.5	27.5	5.62
2005	37,814	11,699	26,115	39.9	12.3	27.6	5.56
2006	39,298	11,894	27,404	39.5	12.0	27.5	5.50
2007	40,807	12,135	28,672	39.1	11.6	27.5	5.43
2008	42,302	12,361	29,941	38.7	11.3	27.4	5.36
2009	43,778	12,593	31,185	38.3	11.0	27.3	5.29
2010	45,207	12,839	32,368	38.0	10.8	27.2	5.21
2011	46,562	13,060	33,502	37.5	10.5	27.0	5.13
2012	47,565	13,218	34,347	36.8	10.2	26.6	5.04
2013	48,510	13,351	35,159	36.0	9.9	26.1	4.95
2014	49,389	13,499	35,890	35.3	9.6	25.6	4.86
2015	50,205	13,662	36,543	34.5	9.4	25.1	4.77
2016	50,965	13,784	37,181	33.8	9.1	24.7	4.69
2017	51,669	13,928	37,741	33.1	8.9	24.2	4.60
2018	52,372	14,040	38,332	32.4	8.7	23.7	4.51
2019	53,083	14,189	38,894	31.8	8.5	23.3	4.43
2020	53,813	14,818	38,995	31.4	8.6	22.7	4.35
2021	54,000	14,840	39,160	30.7	8.4	22.3	4.27
2022	54,328	14,456	39,872	30.1	8.0	22.1	4.17
2023	54,694	14,556	40,138	29.6	7.9	21.7	4.08
2024	56,763	14,858	41,905	30.0	7.9	22.1	4.12
2025	57,351	15,127	42,224	29.6	7.8	21.8	4.04
* CBR = crude birth rate (per 1,000); CDR = crude death rate (per 1,000); NC = natural change (per 1,000); TFR = total fertility rate (children per woman). Absolute numbers rounded. Source: United Nations, Department of Economic and Social Affairs, Population Division (2024). World Population Prospects 2024 (medium variant).

== Ethnic groups ==
Ethnic groups in Equatorial Guinea
Fang	85.7%
Bubi	6.5%
Ndowe (Playeros)	3.6%
Annobonese	1.6%
Other	1.4%
Bujeba	1.1%

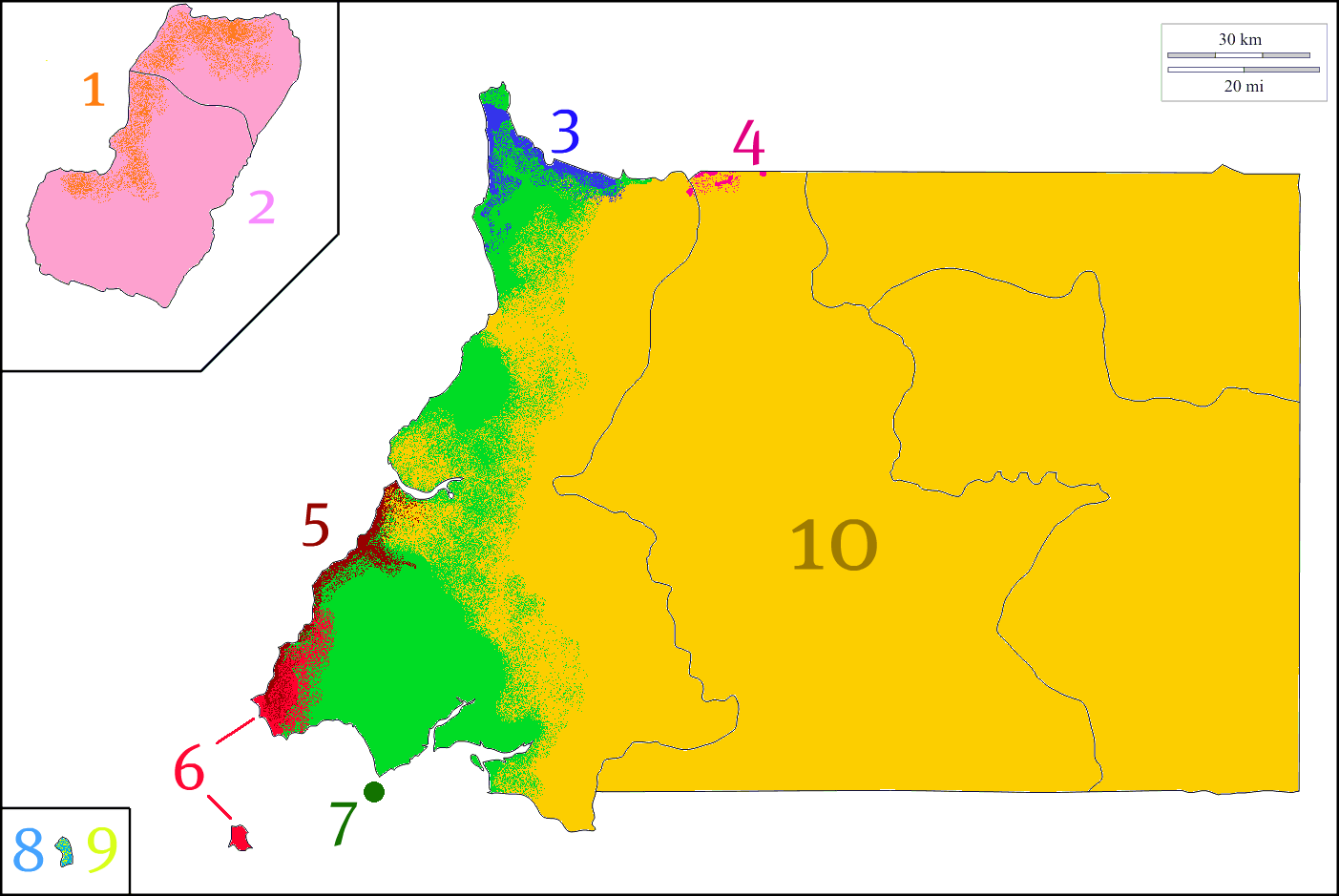
Map of ethnic groups. 1. Fernandino (Malabo city and Luba): 2. Bubi (Bioko Island); 3. Igbo (far northwest); 4. Baka (Acot area); 5. Kwasio/Bujeba (Playeros); 6. Benga (Playeros); 7. Gabonese (Cocobeach City); 8. Annobonese (mixed Portuguese, Angolan, Spanish); 9. Annobonese Creoles (Annobon Island); 10. Fang

=== Native ethnic groups ===
The majority of the people of Equatorial Guinea are of Niger-Congo origin. The largest ethnic group, the Fang, are indigenous to the mainland, but substantial migration to Bioko Island has resulted in Fang dominance over the earlier Bubi inhabitants. The Fang constitute 80% of the population and are themselves divided into 67 clans. Those in the northern part of Rio Muni speak Fang-Ntumu, while those in the south speak Fang-Okah; the two dialects are mutually unintelligible. The Bubi, who constitute 15% of the population, are indigenous to Bioko Island.

In addition, there are coastal ethnic groups, collectively referred to as Ndowe or Playeros ("Beach People" in Spanish): Combes, Bujebas, Balengues and Bengas on the mainland and small islands and a Fernandino community of Krio descended people on Bioko. Together, these groups compose 5% of the population.

Two small groups of Pygmies also inhabit the country, the Beyele and the Bokuign, the former being located in the Altos de Nsork region. Their population is dwindling, them being subjected to heavy pressure from their neighbours, who don't even consider them as human.

=== Recently immigrated peoples ===
Some Europeans (largely of Spanish or Portuguese descent) – among them mixed with African ethnicity – also live in the nation. Most Spaniards left after independence. There is a growing number of foreigners from neighboring Cameroon, Nigeria, and Gabon. Equatorial Guinea received Asians and black Africans from other countries as workers on cocoa and coffee plantations. There are some hundreds of Latin Americans in the country since the late 20th century. 17,000 Spanish people and 5,000 Chinese people also live in Equatorial Guinea. The non-Africans living in Equatorial Guinea represent almost 10% of the nation's total population. Other black Africans came from Liberia, Angola, and Mozambique, and Asians are mostly Chinese with small numbers of Indians. Equatorial Guinea also allowed many fortune-seeking European settlers of other nationalities, including British, French and Germans. After independence, thousands of Equatorial Guineans went to Spain. Another 100,000 Equatorial Guineans went to Cameroon, Gabon, and Nigeria because of dictatorship of Francisco Macías Nguema. Some of its communities also live in Brazil, United States, Spain, Colombia, Mexico, Argentina, Peru, Portugal, and France.

== Languages ==
Spanish, French and Portuguese are the official languages and spoken as second languages. Spanish is the language of education, and for this reason a majority of the population (about 88%) can speak it. Spanish is spoken as a native language by a small minority in Equatorial Guinea, primarily in larger cities.

Annobonese speak a Portuguese Creole, named Annobonese, as their first language. Asian migrants and descendants of European settlers (mostly Spaniards, Britons and Portuguese) usually speak their ancestral languages along with Spanish. Other Africans usually speak their native languages and their nation's official languages – English and Igbo for Nigerians; English for Cameroonians and Liberians; French for Cameroonians and Gabonese; and Portuguese for Angolans and Mozambicans. The latter was made an official language since July 13, 2007. 82% of first foreign language learners choose the French language and 18% the English language. The Roman Catholic Church has greatly influenced both religion and education.

=== Languages of traditional names ===
Equatoguineans tend to have both a Spanish first name and an African first and last name. When written, the Spanish and African first names are followed by the father's first name (which becomes the principal surname) and the mother's first name. Thus people may have up to four names, with a different surname for each generation.

== Other demographic statistics ==
Demographic statistics according to the World Population Review in 2022.

- One birth every 11 minutes
- One death every 41 minutes
- One net migrant every 41 minutes
- Net gain of one person every 11 minutes

The following demographic statistics are from the CIA World Factbook.

=== Population ===
1,679,173 (2022 est.)
836,178 (July 2020 est.)
note: 2002 census results claim 1,015,000 residents, although this was most likely inflated in anticipation for the December election.

=== Languages ===
Spanish (official) 67.6%, other (includes Fang, Bubi, Portuguese (official), French (official), Portuguese-based Creoles spoken in Ano Bom) 32.4% (1994 est.)

=== Religions ===
Roman Catholic 88%, Protestant 5%, Muslim 2%, other 5% (animist, Baha'i, Jewish) (2015 est.)
Roman Catholic 80%, Protestant 5%, Muslim 2%, other 5% (animist, Baha'i, Jewish) (2010 est.)

=== Age structure ===
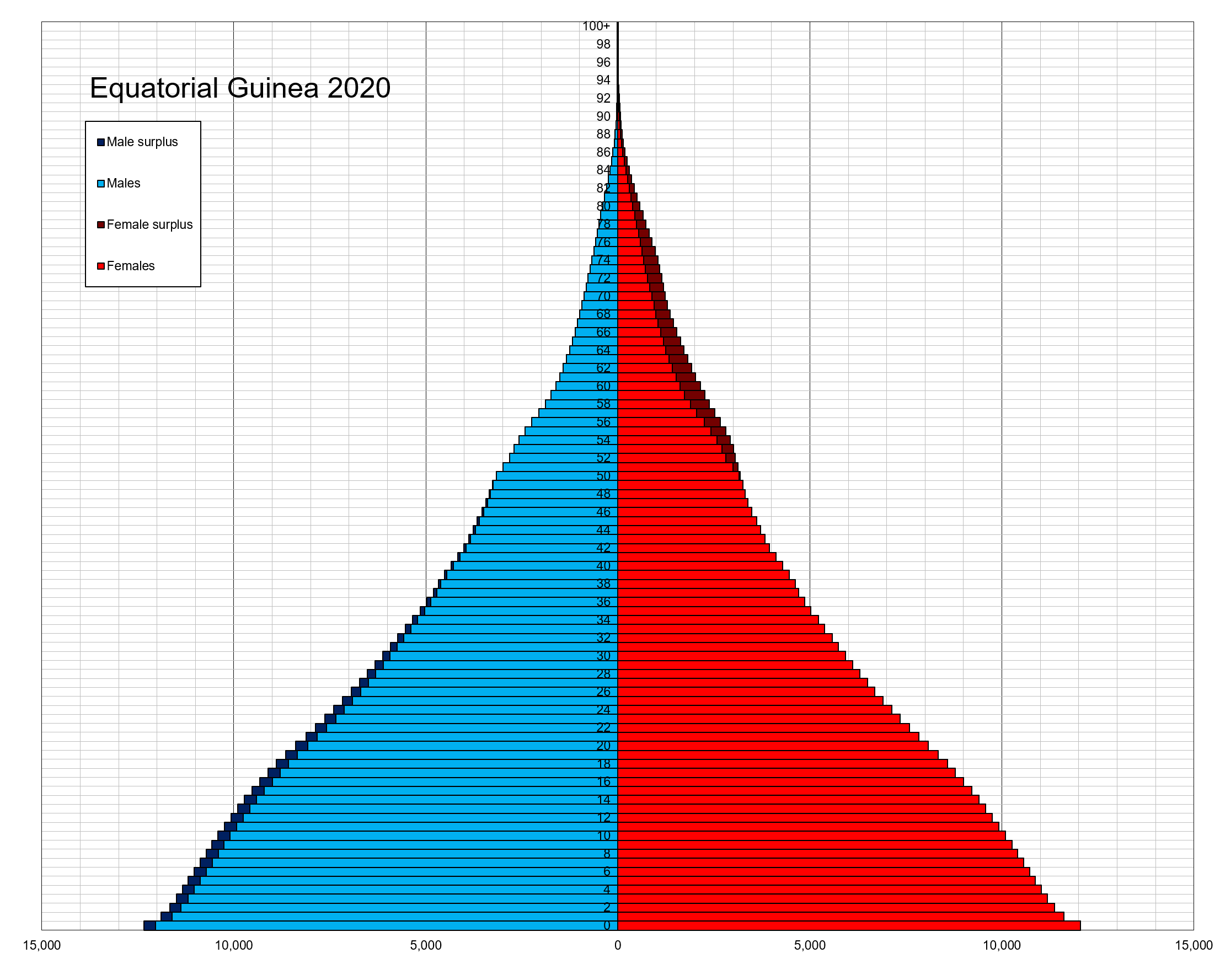
Population pyramid of Equatorial Guinea in 2020

0-14 years: 38.73% (male 164,417 /female 159,400)
15-24 years: 19.94% (male 84,820 /female 81,880)
25-54 years: 32.72% (male 137,632 /female 135,973)
55-64 years: 4.69% (male 17,252 /female 22,006)
65 years and over: 3.92% (male 13,464 /female 19,334) (2020 est.)

=== Population growth rate ===
3.5% (2022 est.) Country comparison to the world: 5th
2.35% (2020 est.) Country comparison to the world: 29th

=== Birth rate ===
29.95 births/1,000 population (2022 est.) Country comparison to the world: 30th
30.7 births/1,000 population (2020 est.) Country comparison to the world: 31st

=== Death rate ===
8.95 deaths/1,000 population (2022 est.) Country comparison to the world: 62nd
7.3 deaths/1,000 population (2020 est.) Country comparison to the world: 112th

=== Total fertility rate ===
4.19 children born/woman (2023 est.) Country comparison to the world: 20th
4.26 children born/woman (2022 est.) Country comparison to the world: 24th
4.11 children born/woman (2020 est.) Country comparison to the world: 29th

=== Median age ===
total: 20.3 years. Country comparison to the world: 192nd
male: 19.9 years
female: 20.7 years (2020 est.)

=== Contraceptive prevalence rate ===
12.6% (2011)

=== Net migration rate ===
13.96 migrant(s)/1,000 population (2022 est.) Country comparison to the world: 3rd
0 migrant(s)/1,000 population (2020 est.) Country comparison to the world: 81st

=== Dependency ratios ===
total dependency ratio: 72.16 (2022 est.)
youth dependency ratio: 60.5 (2020 est.)
elderly dependency ratio: 3.9 (2020 est.)
potential support ratio: 25.5 (2020 est.)

=== Urbanization ===
urban population: 74% of total population (2022)
rate of urbanization: 3.62% annual rate of change (2020-25 est.)

urban population: 73.1% of total population (2020)
rate of urbanization: 4.28% annual rate of change (2015–20 est.)

=== Sex ratio ===
at birth: 1.03 male(s)/female
under 15 years: 1.03 male(s)/female
15–64 years: 0.93 male(s)/female
65 years and over: 0.7 male(s)/female
total population: 1 male(s)/female (2020 est.)

=== Life expectancy at birth ===
total population: 63.7 years. Country comparison to the world: 206th
male: 61.44 years
female: 66.03 years (2022 est.)

total population: 65.7 years (2020 est.) Country comparison to the world: 192nd
male: 64.4 years (2020 est.)
female: 66.9 years (2020 est.)

=== Literacy ===
definition: age 15 and over can read and write (2015 est.)

total population: 95.3% (2015 est.)
male: 97.4% (2015 est.)
female: 93% (2015 est.)

=== Major infectious diseases ===
degree of risk: very high (2020)
food or waterborne diseases: bacterial and protozoal diarrhea, hepatitis A, and typhoid fever
vectorborne diseases: malaria and dengue fever
animal contact diseases: rabies

== See also ==
- Equatorial Guinea
