= 2004 Equatorial Guinea coup attempt =

Failed overthrow of President Obiang by mercenaries

- Location of Equatorial Guinea in Africa
| Date | 7 March 2004 |
| Location | Equatorial Guinea |
| Result | Coup plot failed; Coup plotters arrested in Zimbabwe |

Belligerents
| Equatorial Guinea; Supported by: Zimbabwe | Private mercenaries; Supported by: Private financial backers; Spain (alleged); France (alleged); United Kingdom (alleged) |

Commanders and leaders
| (Equatorial Guinea) Teodoro Obiang Nguema Mbasogo; (Zimbabwe) Robert Mugabe | (United Kingdom) Simon Mann; (Equatorial Guinea) Severo Moto Nsá; (South Africa) Nick du Toit; (United Kingdom) Mark Thatcher |

The 2004 Equatorial Guinea coup attempt, also known as the Wonga Coup, failed to replace President Teodoro Obiang Nguema Mbasogo with exiled opposition politician Severo Moto Nsá. Mercenaries organised by mainly British financiers were arrested in Zimbabwe on 7 March 2004 before they could carry out the plot. Prosecutors alleged that Moto was to be installed as the new president in return for preferential oil rights to corporations affiliated with those involved in the coup. The incident received international media attention after the reported involvement of Mark Thatcher in funding the coup, for which he was convicted and fined in South Africa.

== Summary ==
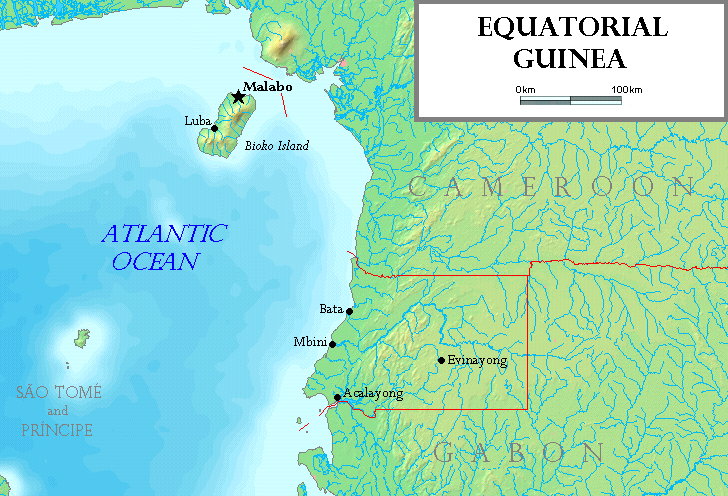
Map of Equatorial Guinea

On 7 March 2004 Zimbabwean police in Harare airport impounded a plane which flew in from South Africa. The alleged plot leader, ex-Special Air Service (SAS) officer Simon Mann, was arrested with two colleagues near the runway while waiting for arms to be loaded on a Boeing 727 (N4610), carrying three crew and 64 former soldiers recruited in South Africa. The majority of those alleged to have been the mercenaries planning to carry out the coup were based in South Africa and ex-members of the 32 Buffalo Battalion, an elite light infantry unit that fought for the South African Defence Force.

On 9 March 2004 Nick du Toit and 14 other South African and Angolan men were arrested in Equatorial Guinea on suspicion of being the mercenaries' vanguard.

The marketing manager of Zimbabwe Defense Industries, Hope Mutize, said in court that Simon Mann had paid him a deposit of $180,000 (£100,000) in February 2004 and indirectly linked Mann to the alleged plot by saying he was accompanied by a South African, Nick du Toit, the leader of the 14 men arrested in Equatorial Guinea. Their arms requisition included 20 machine guns, 61 AK-47 assault rifles, 150 hand grenades, 10 rocket-propelled grenade launchers (and 100 RPG shells), and 75,000 rounds of ammunition. Mann said he wanted the rifles, mortars and ammunition to guard diamond mines in volatile parts of the Democratic Republic of Congo.

It was alleged that those arrested in Zimbabwe made a stopover in Harare City to buy weapons and expected to join a team in Equatorial Guinea to overthrow President Obiang. Du Toit, the leader of those detained in Equatorial Guinea, testified at his trial in Equatorial Guinea that he was recruited by Mann and that he was helping with recruitment, acquiring weapons and logistics. He testified he was told they were trying to install an exiled opposition politician, with Severo Moto Nsá as the new president.

== Prosecution and media evidence ==
=== Equatorial Guinea ===
Judge Salvador Ondo Nkumu adjourned the trial at the prosecution's request for 30 days saying more time was needed to investigate the case. He also read out the verdicts and sentences for the mercenaries.

=== Simon Mann letter ===
In a letter from prison on 31 March, Simon Mann told his wife, Amanda, and his legal team:

"Our situation is not good and it is very URGENT. It may be that getting us out comes down to a large splodge of wonga! Of course investors did not think this would happen. Did !? .... They [the lawyers] get no reply from Smelly and Scratcher [who] asked them to ring back after the Grand Prix race was over!......We need heavy influence of the sort that ... Smelly, Scratcher ... David Hart and it needs to be used heavily and now. Once we get into a real trial scenario we are fucked."

David Hart was former prime minister Margaret Thatcher's unofficial adviser during the miners' strike and served as special adviser to Michael Portillo and Malcolm Rifkind in subsequent Conservative administrations. "Scratcher" is thought to be Sir Mark Thatcher and "Smelly" Ely Calil.

=== "Wonga List" of the financial backers ===
The names were allegedly on a so-called "Wonga List" by James Kershaw – then 24 years old, who was believed to have acted as Mann's accountant. Kershaw is said to have been brought in by Nigel Morgan, a security consultant and former Irish Guards officer who had employed Kershaw as an IT expert and accountant at a diamond mine in the DR Congo operated by his then employer, MIBA. Morgan, a friend of Mann, refused to comment when asked whether he had been involved in the coup attempt, but was known for his connections to the South African Secret Service and was suspected of reporting on the plotters to the authorities. He may have installed Kershaw in the scheme to keep tabs on Mann and the other plotters.

Kershaw entered a witness protection scheme after voluntarily surrendering to police on the advice of his lawyers. He was given 24-hour police protection because of assassination concerns. The list, said to have been handed over to South African police by Kershaw and other former colleagues of Mann, who have turned state's evidence, has been seen by The Guardian.

=== Johann Smith intelligence reports ===
In December 2003 and January 2004 two separate highly detailed reports of the planned coup were sent to two senior officers in British intelligence and to Michael Westphal, then senior colleague of Donald Rumsfeld. The documents were from Johann Smith, a former commander in South African Special Forces and an internationally renowned security analyst who has been an occasional adviser to President Obiang.

In a statement by Smith given to lawyers representing the government of Equatorial Guinea, he says he began hearing rumours of a coup in both Equatorial Guinea and Sao Tomé in November 2003 from two ex-soldiers of the 32 Buffalo Battalion who told him they had been recruited for a coup by Nick du Toit:

Because I was continuing to work in Equatorial Guinea with government, it was not in my interest that there be a coup d'etat.....'I therefore wanted to warn the Equatorial Guinea authorities. I also considered it my duty to warn the authorities in US and England because some of their nationals might be killed. I submitted a report in December 2003 of what I had discovered to Michael Westphal of the Pentagon (in Donald Rumsfeld's department). I expected the US government to take steps to warn Equatorial Guinea or to stop the coup. This was also my expectation as regard the British government, which I warned through two SIS people I knew, and to whom I sent the report by email, also in December 2003, to their personal email addresses.

The report named several major players arrested in March and now on trial for their involvement in the failed putsch. Smith said the group had hired two fishing trawlers to operate off the West African coast, despite the fact that all but one member of the group had no seagoing or fishing experience.

The report concluded that the commercial fishing operation was a front for the movement of men and arms for a coup. The report also mentioned the group's connections with the Equatorial Guinea opposition leader Severo Moto and warned that any operation would pose a threat to stability in the region.

==== Second report ====
When Smith began to get more intelligence of the plot in January from his former military colleagues who were working for Nick du Toit's South African firm, he sent another report to the Pentagon and SIS marked strictly confidential:

'After preparing and sending my December report I received further information.... I put this in a second report, which I sent by email to the same people as the first one: Michael Westphal of the US and to British SIS contacts'.

Documents seen by The Observer reveal that by the end of January, the Foreign Office was being told:

"According to the latest planning, Carlos Cardoso (ex-South African special forces soldier) would, on his return, recruit a total of 75 ex-SADF [South African Defence Force] members, mainly from within the former 32 Buffalo's (battalions) and Special Forces ranks to launch simultaneous actions in STP and EG. These actions are planned to take place in mid-March 2004 (The alleged plotters were arrested on 7 March en route to Equatorial Guinea).... Knowing the individuals as well as I do, this timeline is very realistic and will provide for ample time to plan, mobile, equip and deploy the force."

Smith, who claims he has received death threats since the plot was thwarted, said there was no response from British or US authorities to his warnings:

The only thing that happened was that the US authorities froze the Equatorial Guinea money with the Riggs Bank in USA.

=== Release of emails and unpublished memoirs ===
In 2024, Mann provided The Daily Telegraph with access to emails and unpublished memoirs providing additional information. On the 20th anniversary of the coup attempt, the newspaper published an article on the coup.

== Network of support and financiers ==
=== Mark Thatcher ===
On 25 August 2004, Mark Thatcher, the son of the former Prime Minister of the United Kingdom Margaret Thatcher, was arrested under anti-mercenary laws in South Africa after being accused of helping to finance the coup to remove President Obiang. Crause Steyl was one of the pilots picked to fly the key planners of the coup in a chartered King 200 twin turbo prop aircraft, registered ZS-NBJ, who later turned prosecution witness in South Africa.:

Crause Steyl: "I met Mark (Thatcher) three or four times. He was a partner in the venture. He put in about $250,000. The money was wired to my company account in various installments. The helicopters cost about $600 an hour plus $5,000 each for the pilots and $10,000 a month for special insurance."

Thatcher has admitted putting money into Steyl's company, Triple A Aviation, but he has said it was to cover the cost of an air ambulance project. Steyl dismissed this explanation. "He knew what was going on," he said. "I only knew him in the context of the Equatorial Guinea business. I didn't know him before and I haven't met him since."

On 13 October 2004 in London, a lawyer for the Equatorial Guinea government said that telephone records showed four calls between the homes of one of the alleged financiers behind the plot, Ely Calil, and Jeffrey Archer in the run-up to the coup attempt in March. Another alleged plotter, Greg Wales, also made five calls to Mark Thatcher in the days after the failed coup.

On 13 January 2005, Mark Thatcher, in a South African court, pleaded guilty to helping finance a coup plot in Equatorial Guinea. South African police were able to prove that Thatcher had transferred about US$285,000 to the mercenaries that were to execute the operation and had met and talked frequently to them prior to the coup attempt. After pleading guilty, he was given a four-year suspended sentence and a fine of about US$560,000.

=== Ely Calil ===
Ely Calil, the Chelsea-based Lebanese oil billionaire who was sued in London by the Government of Equatorial Guinea, is alleged to have raised another $750,000. Calil's solicitor said that he did not wish to respond to the claim that he had raised money for the plotters. But he denied any knowledge of the plot. Nigel Morgan, who is said to have interviewed Calil in the aftermath, claimed Calil offered to provide information about the plot to the South African government and betray the other plotters in exchange for staving off prosecution.

=== David Tremain ===
David Tremain, a South Africa-based British businessman, is alleged to have raised $500,000. Tremain is alleged to have been "fronting" for a syndicate of South African and other minor investors. Tremain denies any involvement in the coup.

=== Jeffrey Archer ===
Bank details of Simon Mann's Guernsey firm, Logo Logistics, reveal that a JH Archer made a payment of $134,000 (£74,000) into his account in the days before the failed coup attempt. Jeffrey Archer initially issued a statement through his lawyers stating that he had "no prior knowledge" of the alleged coup and that he had not spoken to Sir Mark for "approximately 10 years".

In January, on the same day the plotters were meeting at Sandton in Johannesburg, Ely Calil called Lord Archer and the pair apparently spoke for 15 minutes. Other calls followed in the run-up to the coup attempt. A lawyer for the Equatorial Guinea government said in London that telephone records showed four calls between Ely Calil and Archer in the run-up to the coup attempt in March.

=== Severo Moto ===
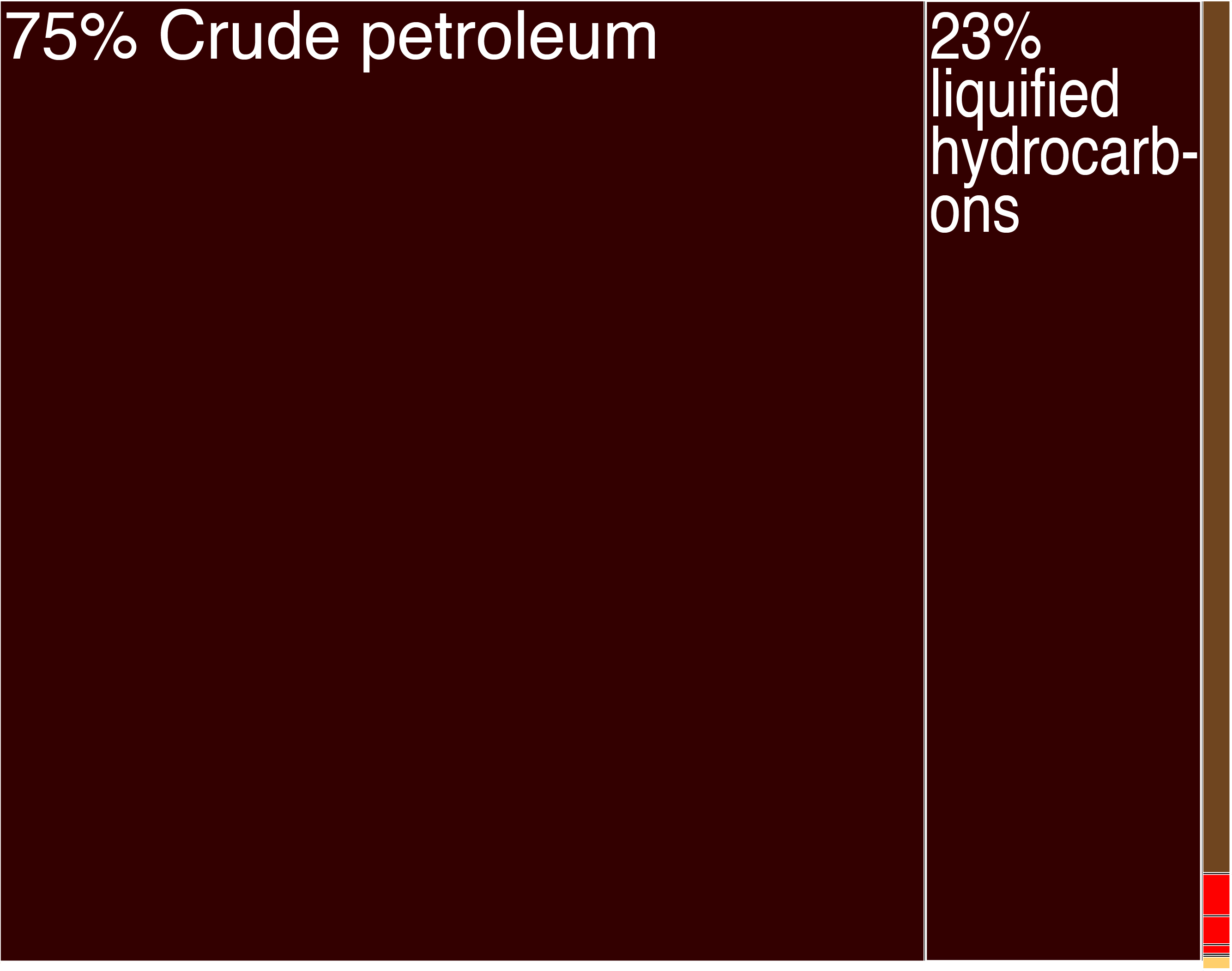
Treemap of Equatorial Guinea's exports in 2009: as can be seen, it is almost entirely petroleum. The country also contained unexploited reserves of gold, manganese and uranium.

Prosecutors said Equatorial Guinea's opposition leader, Severo Moto Nsá, based in Spain, offered the group $1.8m and oil rights to overthrow the government.

=== Tim Bell ===
Timothy Bell, Lady Thatcher's former spin doctor, is linked to the case by "advising" Mann's friends. Bell has said that as far as he was aware neither Mark Thatcher nor Hart were involved in the alleged coup.

=== Greg Wales / US administration ===
President Obiang accused the US of backing the plot, but the Pentagon denies supporting it. US officials say it was Greg Wales who made all the approaches to them. Greg Wales, a London-based property dealer, is alleged to have raised $500,000. Equatorial Guinea official sources claim that in November 2003 ^{wrong date?}, when the plot was in its early stages, an Old Etonian mercenary, Simon Mann, paid Mr Wales about $8,000. Mr Wales denies any involvement in the coup.

Theresa Whelan, a member of the Bush administration in charge of African affairs at the Pentagon, twice met a London-based businessman, Greg Wales, in Washington before the coup attempt. Mr Wales has been accused of being one of its organisers, but has denied any involvement. A US defence official told Newsweek magazine:

Mr Wales mentioned in passing [...] there might be some trouble brewing in Equatorial Guinea. Specifically, he had heard from some business associates of his that wealthy citizens of the country were planning to flee in case of a crisis.

== UK prior knowledge ==
Britain was given a full outline of the coup plot, including the dates, details of arms shipments and key players, months before the coup was launched.

Until 9 November 2004, cabinet ministers had denied any prior knowledge of the attempted illegal coup. Jack Straw and minister for Africa Chris Mullin were, however, personally told of the plot on Friday, 30 January. After receiving news of the coup, Jack Straw ordered a change to evacuation plans for British citizens in Equatorial Guinea.

President Obiang commented on the lack of warning despite admissions of prior knowledge:

This is particularly surprising in view of the fact that a number of British citizens and residents of the UK appear to be central to the conspiracy to overthrow the government of Equatorial Guinea.

Jack Straw had told parliament that the Foreign and Commonwealth Office did investigate if there were any British companies involved in the plot after receiving confidential reports, but failed to find any evidence. British officials, and Jack Straw, were forced to apologise to The Observer after categorically denying they had prior knowledge of the coup plot.

== Spain ==
President Obiang accused the Spanish government of supporting the plot. The allegation could explain the position of two Spanish warships off the coast of Equatorial Guinea, at the time of the arrests of the alleged plotters. Miguel Mifuno, special adviser to Equatorial Guinea's president, accused the Spanish government of funding opposition groups in exile and supporting the coup directly:

Our intelligence sources say that the warship was going to arrive on the same date that the coup attempt was going to take place – 8 March.....It [the war ship] was already in our territorial waters with 500 soldiers aboard. Meanwhile there was a team of foreign mercenaries already in Equatorial Guinea who knew where we lived. They had plans to kill 50 people and to arrest others.

The Spanish foreign ministry spokeswoman denied the allegations; "There was no ship there, we deny any kind of implication in any attempted coup". However the Spanish foreign minister, Ana Palacio seemed to contradict the spokeswoman's statement; "They weren't on a mission of war, but one of cooperation."

== In popular culture ==
A dramatisation of the coup attempt, entitled Coup! and written by John Fortune, was broadcast by BBC Two in 2006, starring Robert Bathurst and Jared Harris.

== See also ==
- 1979 Equatorial Guinea coup d'état
- List of coups and coup attempts

== Further viewing ==
- Fresh One Productions (7 December 2009). "Simon Mann's African Coup: Black Beach". Storyville. Season 2009–10. Episode 9/18. BBC. BBC Four.
- Shadow Company, Purpose Films, 2006.
- Once Upon a Coup, PBS Documentary, August 2009, Once Upon a Coup ~ Full Episode | Wide Angle | PBS
