= Equatorial Guinea =

Country in Central Africa

Republic of Equatorial Guinea
(in official languages)
Spanish	República de Guinea Ecuatorial
French	République de Guinée Équatoriale
Portuguese	República da Guiné Equatorial
- Flag Coat of arms
- Motto: Unidad, Paz, Justicia (Spanish) "Unity, Peace, Justice"
- Anthem: Himno Nacional de Guinea Ecuatorial (Spanish) "National Anthem of Equatorial Guinea"
- Capital: Ciudad de la Paz; 1°35′20″N 10°49′21″E
- Largest city: Bata
- Official languages: Spanish (Main language); French; Portuguese
- Recognised regional languages: List: Fang; Bube; Annobonese Creole; Kombe; Kwasio
- Ethnic groups (2020): 85.7% Fang; 6.5% Bubi; 3.6% Ndowe; 1.6% Annobon; 1.1% Bujeba; 1.1% others
- Religion (2020): 88.7% Christianity; 5.0% no religion; 4.0% Islam; 1.7% traditional faiths; 0.6% others
- Demonyms: Equatoguinean; Equatorial Guinean
- Government: Unitary presidential republic under a hereditary dictatorship
  - President: Teodoro Obiang Nguema Mbasogo
  - Vice President: Teodoro Nguema Obiang Mangue
  - Prime Minister: Manuel Osa Nsue Nsua
  - Chief Justice: Joaquín Asong Owono Mbang
- Legislature: Parliament
  - Upper house: Senate
  - Lower house: Chamber of Deputies

Independence from Spain
  - Declared: 12 October 1968
  - 1979 Equatorial Guinea coup d'état: 3 August 1979

Area
  - Total: 28,050 km^{2} (10,830 sq mi) (141st)
  - Water (%): negligible

Population
  - 2025 estimate: ▲1,795,834 (154th)
  - Density: 67/km^{2} (173.5/sq mi) (147th)
- GDP (PPP): 2025 estimate
  - Total: ▲$33.003 billion (149th)
  - Per capita: ▲$20,017 (92nd)
- GDP (nominal): 2025 estimate
  - Total: ▲$12.680 billion (149th)
  - Per capita: ▲$7,750 (95th)
- Gini (2022): 38.5 medium inequality
- HDI (2023): ▲0.674 medium (133rd)
- Currency: Central African CFA franc (XAF)
- Time zone: UTC+1 (WAT)
- Calling code: +240
- ISO 3166 code: GQ
- Internet TLD: .gq
- 1. Including Equatoguinean Spanish (Español ecuatoguineano)

Equatorial Guinea, (Note: (Spanish: Guinea Ecuatorial [giˈnea ekwatoˈɾjal]; French: Guinée équatoriale; Portuguese: Guiné Equatorial).) officially the Republic of Equatorial Guinea, (Note: (Spanish: República de Guinea Ecuatorial, French: République de Guinée équatoriale, Portuguese: República da Guiné Equatorial), Local pronunciation: Spanish: República de Guinea Ecuatorial Spanish pronunciation: [reˈpuβlika ðe ɣiˈnea ekwatoˈɾjal]; French: République de Guinée équatoriale [ʁepyblik d(ə) ɡine ekwatoʁjal]; Portuguese: República da Guiné Equatorial Portuguese pronunciation: [ʁɛˈpuβlikɐ ðɐ ɣiˈnɛ ˌekwɐtuɾiˈal]) is a country on the west coast of Central Africa and the only Spanish-speaking country in Africa. It has an area of 28,000 square kilometres (11,000 sq mi). Formerly the colony of Spanish Guinea, its post-independence name refers to its location both near the Equator and in the African region of Guinea. As of 2025, the country has a population of 1,853,559, over 85% of whom are members of the Fang people, the country's dominant ethnic group. The Bubi people, indigenous to Bioko Island, are the second largest group at approximately 6.5% of the population. The capital, since January 2026, is Ciudad de la Paz, and Bata is the largest city.

Equatorial Guinea consists of two parts. The mainland region, Río Muni, is bordered by Cameroon to the north and Gabon to the south and east. It has the majority of the population. Río Muni's small offshore islands include Corisco, Elobey Grande, and Elobey Chico. The insular region consists of the islands of Bioko (formerly Fernando Po) in the Gulf of Guinea and Annobón. Bioko Island is the northernmost part of Equatorial Guinea and is the site of Malabo. The Portuguese-speaking island nation of São Tomé and Príncipe is located between Bioko and Annobón. The Equator runs through Equatorial Guinea's territorial waters, about 1.4° north of Annobón.

Pygmies are the first confirmed inhabitants to settle in the area of present-day Equatorial Guinea, followed by a migration of Bantu-speaking groups in the 6th century BC. Portuguese explorer Fernando Pó explored the area in 1472. Via the 1778 Treaty of El Pardo, Portugal ceded territories in the Bight of Biafra to Spain; the territory was declared Spanish Guinea during the Scramble for Africa. Nearly 200 years later, it gained independence in 1968 under the bloody dictatorship of President Francisco Macías Nguema. He declared himself president for life in 1972 but was overthrown in a coup in 1979 by his nephew, Teodoro Obiang Nguema Mbasogo, who has served as the country's president since. Obiang's regime has also been widely characterised as a dictatorship by foreign observers.

Since the mid-1990s, Equatorial Guinea has become one of Sub-Saharan Africa's largest oil producers. It has subsequently become one of the richest countries per capita in Africa; this wealth is extremely unevenly distributed, with few people benefiting from the oil riches. However, the country has the second-highest Human Development Index among Sub-Saharan countries (rank 133rd), and 7.7% of children dying before the age of five in 2021, a continuous reduction from 17.9% in 1990.

Since Equatorial Guinea is a former Spanish colony, Spanish is the main official language. French and (as of 2010) Portuguese have also been made official. Apart from the Spanish territories in Africa (Ceuta, Melilla, and the Canary Islands), Equatorial Guinea is one of the two countries (the other being the partially recognised Sahrawi Arab Democratic Republic) and the only sovereign country in Africa where Spanish is an official language. Spain supports education and research for citizens, including cooperation on teachers training and postgraduate/doctoral education. The education was highly influenced by the Spanish system, and Equatorial Guinea has had one of the highest literacy rates among Sub-Saharan African countries.

Since the United States oil companies are the main operators of the oil industry, they are the main supporters of revenue. Equatorial Guinea's government is authoritarian and sultanist and has one of the worst human rights records in the world, consistently ranking among the "worst of the worst" in Freedom House's annual survey of political and civil rights. Reporters Without Borders ranks Obiang among its "predators" of press freedom. Human trafficking in the country is a significant problem, with the US Trafficking in Persons Report identifying Equatorial Guinea as a source and destination country for forced labour and sex trafficking.The country is a member of the United Nations, African Union, Francophonie, OPEC, and the CPLP.

== History ==
Pygmies likely once lived in the continental region but are today found only in isolated pockets in southern Río Muni. Bantu migrations likely started around 2000 BC from between south-east Nigeria and north-west Cameroon (the Grassfields). They must have settled continental Equatorial Guinea around 500 BC at the latest. The earliest settlements on Bioko are dated to AD 530. The Annobón population, originally native to Angola, was introduced by the Portuguese via São Tomé island.

=== First European contact and Portuguese rule (1472–1778) ===
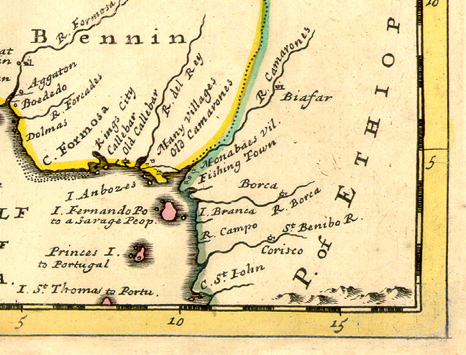
Portuguese rule in Equatorial Guinea lasted from the arrival of Fernão do Pó (Fernando Pó) in 1472 until the 1778 Treaty of El Pardo

Portuguese explorer Fernando Pó, seeking a path to India, is credited as being the first European to see the island of Bioko in 1472. He called it Formosa ("Beautiful"), but it quickly took on the name of its European discoverer. The island of Fernando Pó and Annobón were colonised by Portugal in 1474. The first factories were established on the islands around 1500 as the Portuguese recognised the positives of the islands including volcanic soil and disease-resistant highlands. Despite natural advantages, initial Portuguese efforts in 1507 to establish a sugarcane plantation and town on Fernando Pó failed due to Bubi hostility and fever.

=== Early Spanish rule and lease to Britain (1778–1844) ===
Evolution of Spanish possessions and claims in the Gulf of Guinea, 1778–1968 (in Spanish)

In 1778, Spain and Portugal signed the Treaty of El Pardo. The treaty ceded Bioko and adjacent islets along with commercial rights to the Bight of Biafra between the Niger and Ogooué rivers to Spain in exchange for large areas of modern-day western Brazil being ceded to Portugal. Brigadier Felipe José, Count of Arjelejos of the Spanish Navy formally took possession of Bioko from Portugal on 21 October 1778. While sailing to Annobón to take possession of it, Arjelejos died from a tropical disease contracted on Bioko, and his fever-ridden crew mutinied. The crew, after having lost over 80% of their men to sickness, instead landed on São Tomé where they were imprisoned by Portuguese colonial authorities.

As a result of this disaster, Spain was subsequently hesitant to invest heavily in its new possession. However, despite such a setback, Spanish merchants began to use the island as a base for engaging in the Atlantic slave trade. Between 1778 and 1810, the territory of what became Equatorial Guinea was administered by the Viceroyalty of the Río de la Plata, based in Buenos Aires. From 1827 to 1843 the Spanish leased a base in Bioko to the United Kingdom, which the British had sought as part of their efforts to suppress the slave trade. In 1827 Britain unilaterally moved the headquarters of the Mixed Commission for the Suppression of Slave Traffic to Fernando Pó, before moving it back to Sierra Leone under an agreement with Spain in 1843. Spain's decision to abolish its involvement in the slave trade under British pressure in 1817 damaged the colony's perceived value to the Spanish and so leasing naval bases was an effective revenue earner from an otherwise unprofitable possession. Plans by Spain to sell its African colony to Britain were cancelled in 1841 due to opposition from Spanish politicians and the public.

=== Late 19th century (1844–1900) ===
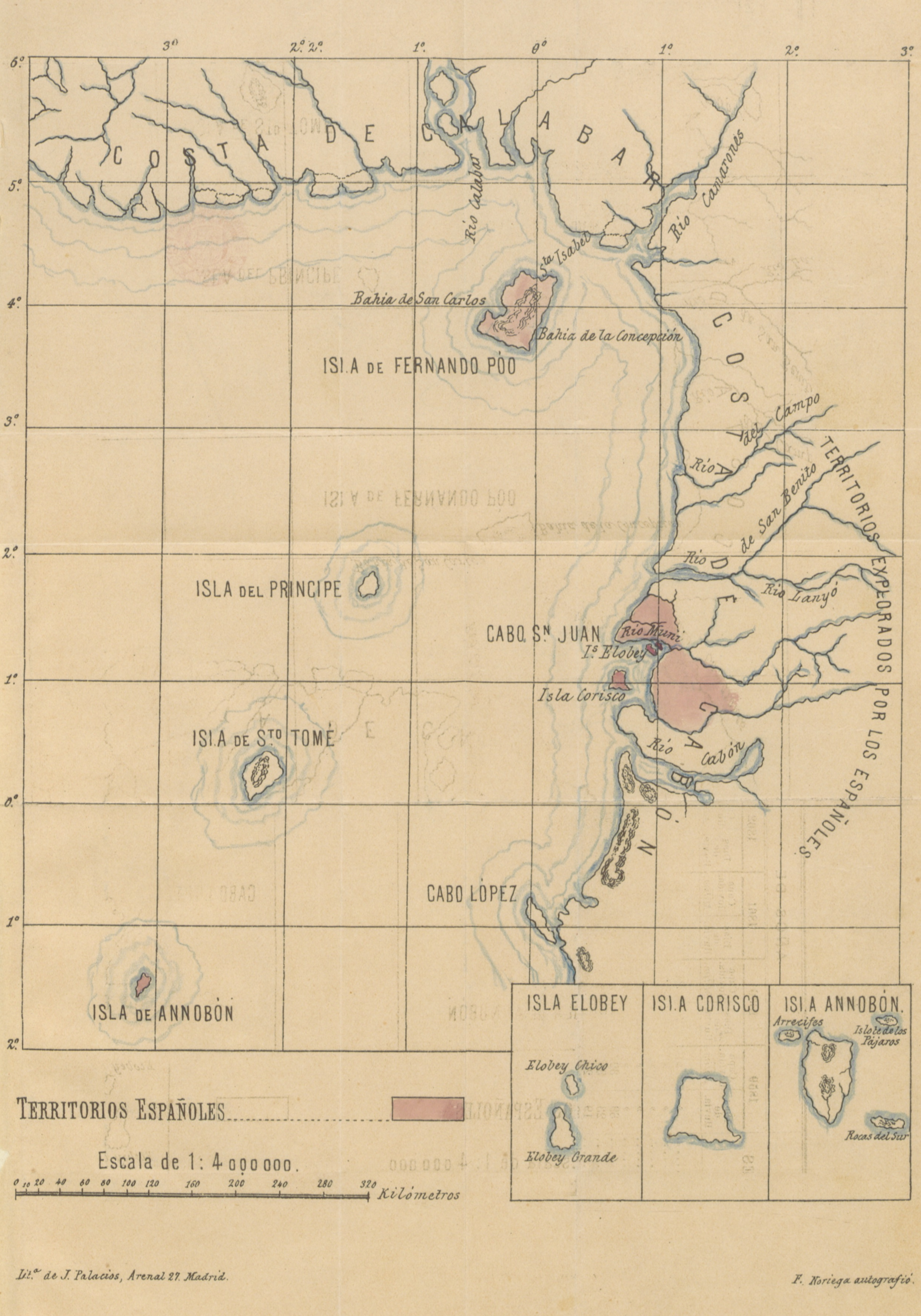
Map of the Spanish possessions in 1897, before the Treaty of Paris (1900)

In 1844, the British returned the island to Spanish control and the area became known as the "Territorios Españoles del Golfo de Guinea". Due to epidemics, Spain did not invest much in the colony, and in 1862, an outbreak of yellow fever killed many of the whites that had settled on the island. Despite this, plantations continued to be established by private citizens through the second half of the 19th century.

The plantations of Fernando Pó were mostly run by a black Creole elite, later known as Fernandinos. The British settled some 2,000 Sierra Leoneans and freed slaves there during their rule, and a trickle of immigration from West Africa and the West Indies continued after the British left. A number of freed Angolan slaves, Portuguese-African creoles and immigrants from Nigeria, and Liberia also began to be settled in the colony, where they quickly began to join the new group. To the local mix were added Cubans, Filipinos, Jews and Spaniards of various colours, many of whom had been deported to Africa for political or other crimes, as well as some settlers backed by the government.

By 1870, the prognosis of whites that lived on the island was much improved after recommendations that they live in the highlands, and by 1884 much of the minimal administrative machinery and key plantations had moved to Basile hundreds of meters above sea level. Henry Morton Stanley had labelled Fernando Pó "a jewel which Spain did not polish" for refusing to enact such a policy. Despite the improved survival chances of Europeans living on the island, Mary Kingsley, who was staying on the island, still described Fernando Pó as "a more uncomfortable form of execution" for Spaniards appointed there.

There was also a trickle of immigration from the neighbouring Portuguese islands, escaped slaves, and prospective planters. Although a few of the Fernandinos were Catholic and Spanish-speaking, about nine-tenths of them were Protestant and English-speaking on the eve of the First World War, and pidgin English was the lingua franca of the island. The Sierra Leoneans were particularly well placed as planters while labour recruitment on the Windward coast continued. The Fernandinos became traders and middlemen between the natives and Europeans. A freed slave from the West Indies by way of Sierra Leone named William Pratt established the cocoa crop on Fernando Pó.

=== Early 20th century (1900–1945) ===
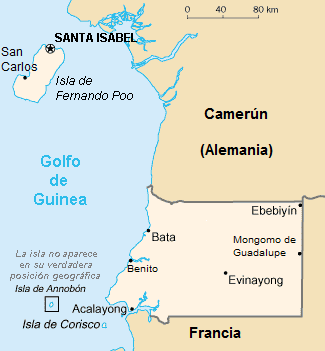
Borders after the agreement of 1900 on the land that would become Spanish Guinea, until the independence of 1968

Spain had not occupied the large area in the Bight of Biafra to which it had right by treaty, and the French had expanded their occupation at the expense of the territory claimed by Spain. Madrid only partly backed the explorations of men like Manuel Iradier who had signed treaties in the interior as far as Gabon and Cameroon, leaving much of the land out of "effective occupation" as demanded by the terms of the 1885 Berlin Conference. Minimal government backing for mainland annexation came as a result of public opinion and a need for labour on Fernando Pó.

The eventual treaty of Paris in 1900 left Spain with the continental enclave of Río Muni, only 26,000 km^{2} (10,000 sq mi) out of the 300,000 km^{2} (120,000 sq mi) stretching east to the Ubangi river which the Spaniards had initially claimed. The humiliation of the Franco-Spanish negotiations, combined with the disaster in Cuba led to the head of the Spanish negotiating team, Pedro Gover y Tovar, committing suicide on the voyage home on 21 October 1901. Iradier himself died in despair in 1911; decades later, the port of Cogo was renamed Puerto Iradier in his honour.

Land regulations issued in 1904–1905 favoured Spaniards, and most of the later big planters arrived from Spain after that. An agreement was made with Liberia in 1914 to import cheap labour. Due to malpractice however, the Liberian government eventually ended the treaty after revelations about the state of Liberian workers on Fernando Pó in the Christy Report which brought down the country's president Charles D. B. King in 1930.

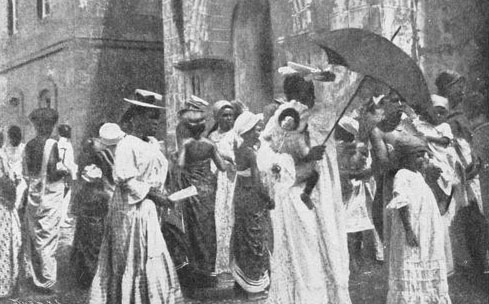
Corisco in 1910

By the late nineteenth century, the Bubi were protected from the demands of the planters by Spanish Claretian missionaries, who were very influential in the colony and eventually organised the Bubi into little mission theocracies reminiscent of the famous Jesuit reductions in Paraguay. Catholic penetration was furthered by two small insurrections in 1898 and 1910 protesting conscription of forced labour for the plantations. The Bubi were disarmed in 1917, and left dependent on the missionaries. Serious labour shortages were temporarily solved by a massive influx of refugees from German Kamerun, along with thousands of white German soldiers who stayed on the island for several years.

Between 1926 and 1959, Bioko and Río Muni were united as the colony of Spanish Guinea. The economy was based on large cacao and coffee plantations and logging concessions and the workforce was mostly immigrant contract labour from Liberia, Nigeria, and Cameroun. Between 1914 and 1930, an estimated 10,000 Liberians went to Fernando Po under a labour treaty that was stopped altogether in 1930. With Liberian workers no longer available, planters of Fernando Po turned to Río Muni. Campaigns were mounted to subdue the Fang people in the 1920s, at the time that Liberia was beginning to cut back on recruitment. There were garrisons of the colonial guard throughout the enclave by 1926, and the whole colony was considered 'pacified' by 1929.

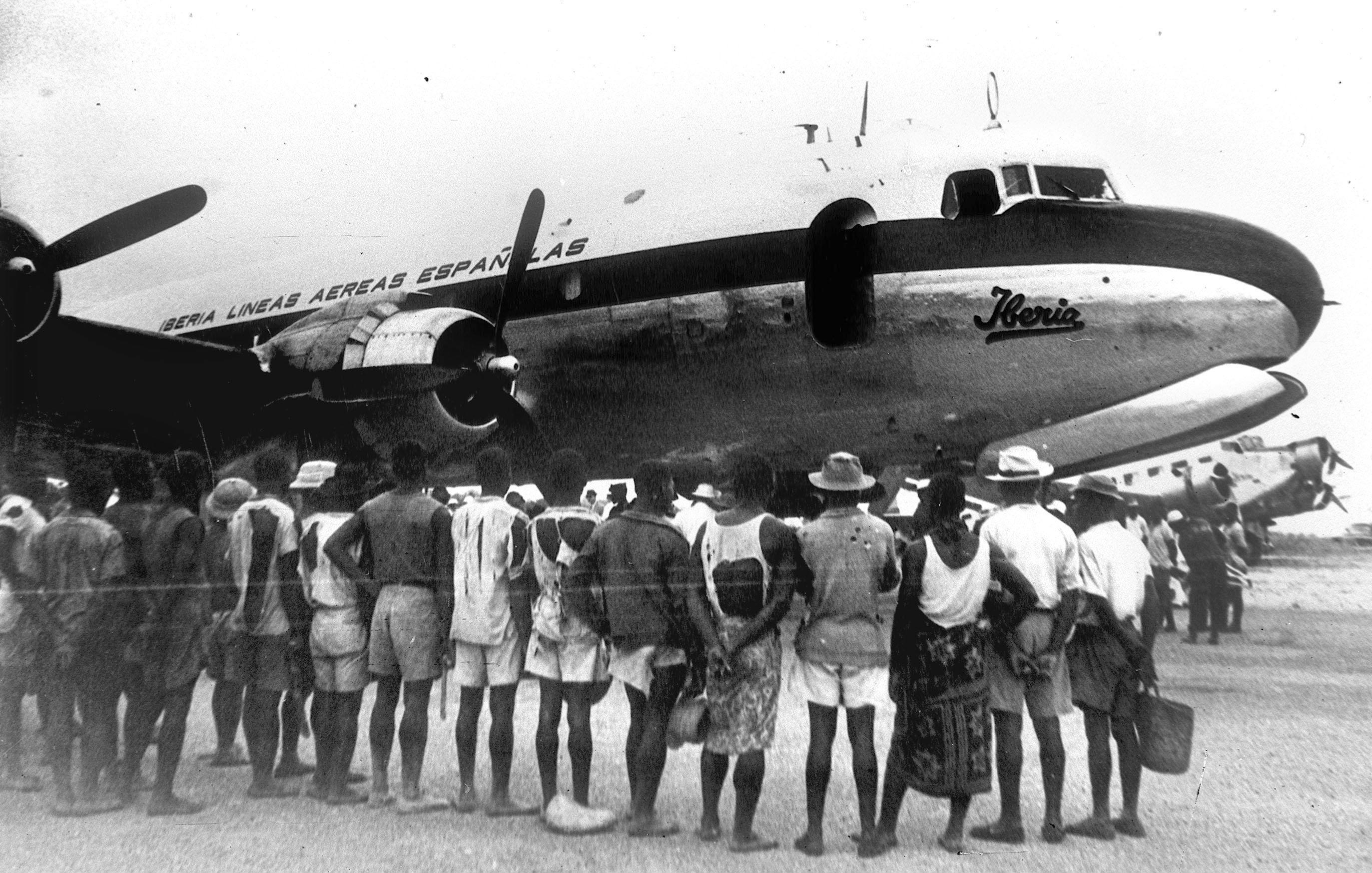
Inaugural flight with Iberia from Madrid to Bata, 1941

The Spanish Civil War had a major impact on the colony. A group of 150 Spanish whites, including the Governor-General and Vice-Governor-General of Río Muni, created a socialist party called the Popular Front in the enclave which served to oppose the interests of the Fernando Pó plantation owners. When the War broke out Francisco Franco ordered Nationalist forces based in the Canaries to ensure control over Equatorial Guinea. In September 1936, Nationalist forces backed by Falangists from Fernando Pó took control of Río Muni, which under Governor-General Luiz Sanchez Guerra Saez and his deputy Porcel had backed the Republican government. By November, the Popular Front and its supporters had been defeated and Equatorial Guinea secured for Franco. The commander in charge of the occupation, Juan Fontán Lobé, was appointed Governor-General by Franco and began to exert more Spanish control over the enclave interior.

Río Muni officially had a little over 100,000 people in the 1930s; escape into Cameroun or Gabon was easy. Fernando Pó thus continued to suffer from labour shortages. The French only briefly permitted recruitment in Cameroun, and the main source of labour came to be Igbo smuggled in canoes from Calabar in Nigeria. This resolution led to Fernando Pó becoming one of Africa's most productive agricultural areas after the Second World War.

=== Final years of Spanish rule (1945–1968) ===
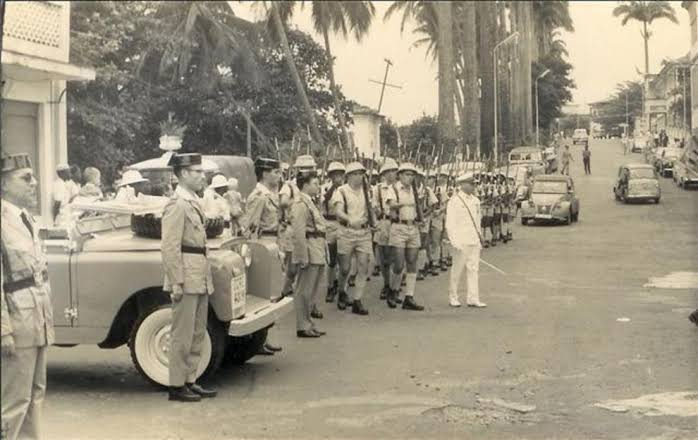
Guardia Civil and Marine Infantry in Spanish Guinea in 1964

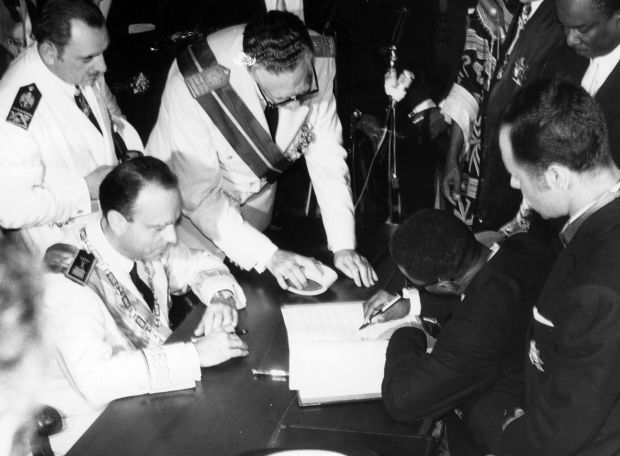
Signing of the independence of Equatorial Guinea by the Spanish minister Manuel Fraga together with the new Equatorial Guinean president Macías Nguema on 12 October 1968

Politically, post-war colonial history has three fairly distinct phases: up to 1959, when its status was raised from "colonial" to "provincial", following the approach of the Portuguese Empire; between 1960 and 1968, when Madrid attempted a partial decolonisation aimed at keeping the territory as part of the Spanish system; and from 1968 on, after the territory became an independent republic. The first phase consisted of little more than a continuation of previous policies; these closely resembled the policies of Portugal and France, notably in dividing the population into a vast majority governed as 'natives' or non-citizens, and a very small minority (together with whites) admitted to civic status as emancipados, assimilation to the metropolitan culture being the only permissible means of advancement.

This "provincial" phase saw the beginnings of nationalism, but chiefly among small groups who had taken refuge from the Caudillo's paternal hand in Cameroun and Gabon. They formed two bodies: the Movimiento Nacional de Liberación de la Guinea (MONALIGE), and the Idea Popular de Guinea Ecuatorial (IPGE). By the late 1960s, much of the African continent had been granted independence. Aware of this trend, the Spanish began to increase efforts to prepare the country for independence. The gross national product per capita in 1965 was $466, which was the highest in black Africa; the Spanish constructed an international airport at Santa Isabel, a television station and increased the literacy rate to 89%. In 1967, the number of hospital beds per capita in Equatorial Guinea was higher than Spain itself, with 1637 beds in 16 hospitals. By the end of colonial rule, the number of Africans in higher education was in only the double digits.

A decision of 9 August 1963, approved by a referendum of 15 December 1963, gave the territory a measure of autonomy and the administrative promotion of a 'moderate' group, the Movimiento de Unión Nacional de Guinea Ecuatorial (MUNGE). This was unsuccessful, and, with growing pressure for change from the UN, Madrid was gradually forced to give way to the currents of nationalism. Two General Assembly resolutions were passed in 1965 ordering Spain to grant independence to the colony, and in 1966, a UN Commission toured the country before recommending the same thing. In response, the Spanish declared that they would hold a constitutional convention on 27 October 1967 to negotiate a new constitution for an independent Equatorial Guinea. The conference was attended by 41 local delegates and 25 Spaniards. The Africans were principally divided between Fernandinos and Bubi on one side, who feared a loss of privileges and 'swamping' by the Fang majority, and the Río Muni Fang nationalists on the other. At the conference, the leading Fang figure, the later first president Francisco Macías Nguema, gave a controversial speech in which he claimed that Adolf Hitler had "saved Africa". After nine sessions, the conference was suspended due to deadlock between the "unionists" and "separatists" who wanted a separate Fernando Pó. Macías resolved to travel to the UN to bolster international awareness of the issue, and his firebrand speeches in New York contributed to Spain naming a date for both independence and general elections. In July 1968 virtually all Bubi leaders went to the UN in New York to try to raise awareness for their cause, but the world community was uninterested in quibbling over the specifics of colonial independence. The 1960s were a time of great optimism over the future of the former African colonies, and groups that had been close to European rulers, like the Bubi, were not viewed positively.

=== Independence under Macías (1968–1979) ===
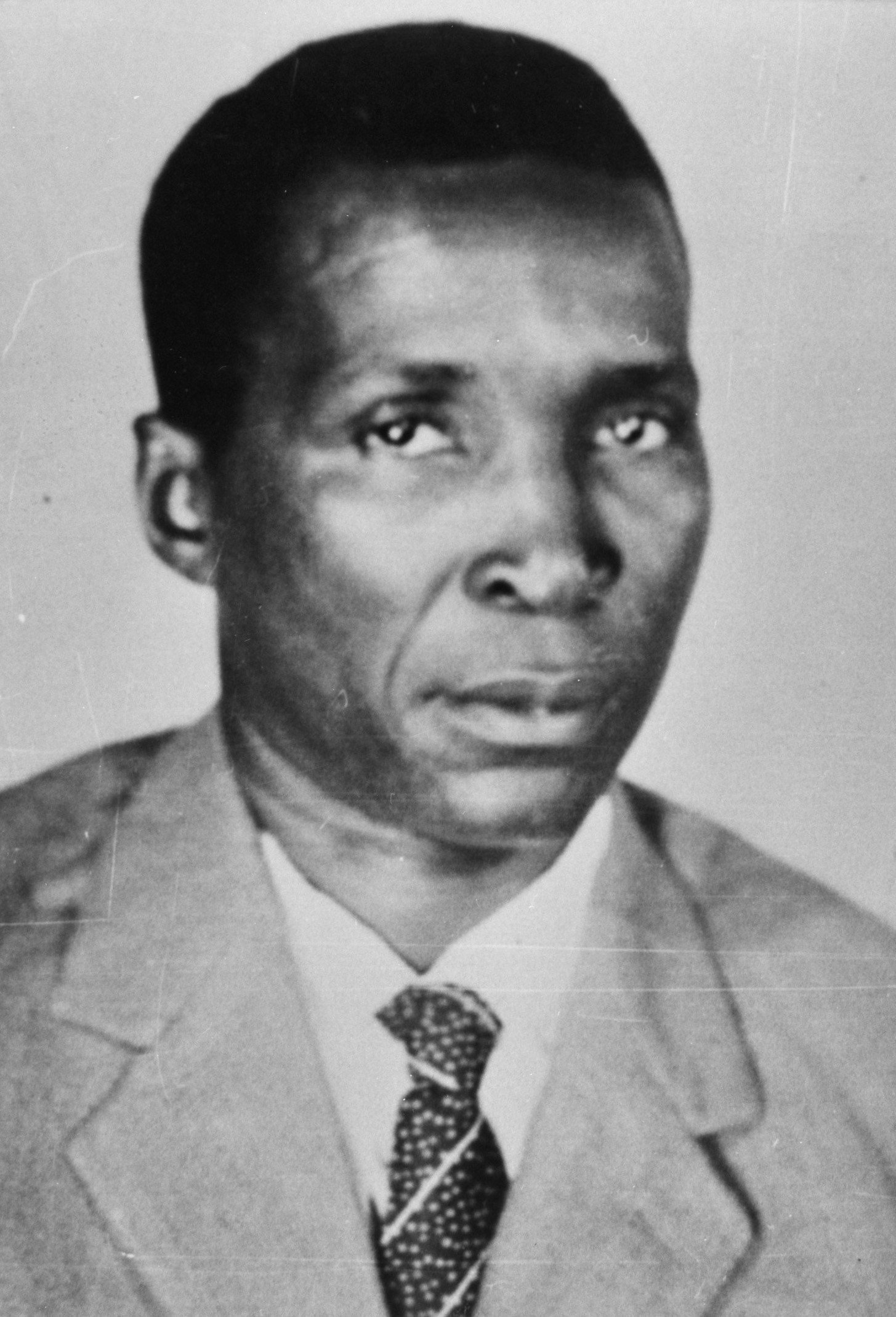
Francisco Macías Nguema, first president of Equatorial Guinea in 1968, became a dictator until he was overthrown in a coup d'état in 1979.

Independence from Spain was gained on 12 October 1968, at noon in the country's then capital, Malabo. The new country became the Republic of Equatorial Guinea (the date is celebrated as the country's Independence Day). Macías became president in the country's only free and fair election to date. The Spanish (ruled by Franco) had backed Macías in the election; much of his campaigning involved visiting rural areas of Río Muni and promising that they would have the houses and wives of the Spanish if they voted for him. He had won in the second round of voting.

During the Nigerian Civil War, Fernando Pó was inhabited by many Biafra-supporting Ibo migrant workers and many refugees from the breakaway state fled to the island. The International Committee of the Red Cross began running relief flights out of Equatorial Guinea, but Macías quickly shut the flights down, refusing to allow them to fly diesel fuel for their trucks nor oxygen tanks for medical operations. The Biafran separatists were starved into submission without international backing.

After the Public Prosecutor complained about "excesses and maltreatment" by government officials, Macías had 150 alleged coup-plotters executed in a purge on Christmas Eve 1969, all of whom were political opponents. Macias Nguema further consolidated his totalitarian powers by outlawing opposition political parties in July 1970 and making himself president for life in 1972. He broke off ties with Spain and the West. In spite of his condemnation of Marxism, which he deemed "neo-colonialist", Equatorial Guinea maintained special relations with communist states, notably China, Cuba, East Germany and the USSR. Macias Nguema signed a preferential trade agreement and a shipping treaty with the Soviet Union. The Soviets also made loans to Equatorial Guinea. The shipping agreement gave the Soviets permission for a pilot fishery development project and also a naval base at Luba. In return, the USSR was to supply fish to Equatorial Guinea. China and Cuba also gave different forms of financial, military, and technical assistance to Equatorial Guinea, which got them a measure of influence there. For the USSR, there was an advantage to be gained in the war in Angola from access to Luba base and later on to Malabo International Airport.

In 1974, the World Council of Churches affirmed that large numbers of people had been murdered since 1968 in an ongoing reign of terror. A quarter of the entire population had fled abroad, they said, while 'the prisons are overflowing and to all intents and purposes form one vast concentration camp'. Out of a population of 300,000, an estimated 80,000 were killed. Apart from allegedly committing genocide against the ethnic minority Bubi people, Macias Nguema ordered the deaths of thousands of suspected opponents, closed down churches and presided over the economy's collapse as skilled citizens and foreigners fled the country.

=== Obiang (1979–present) ===
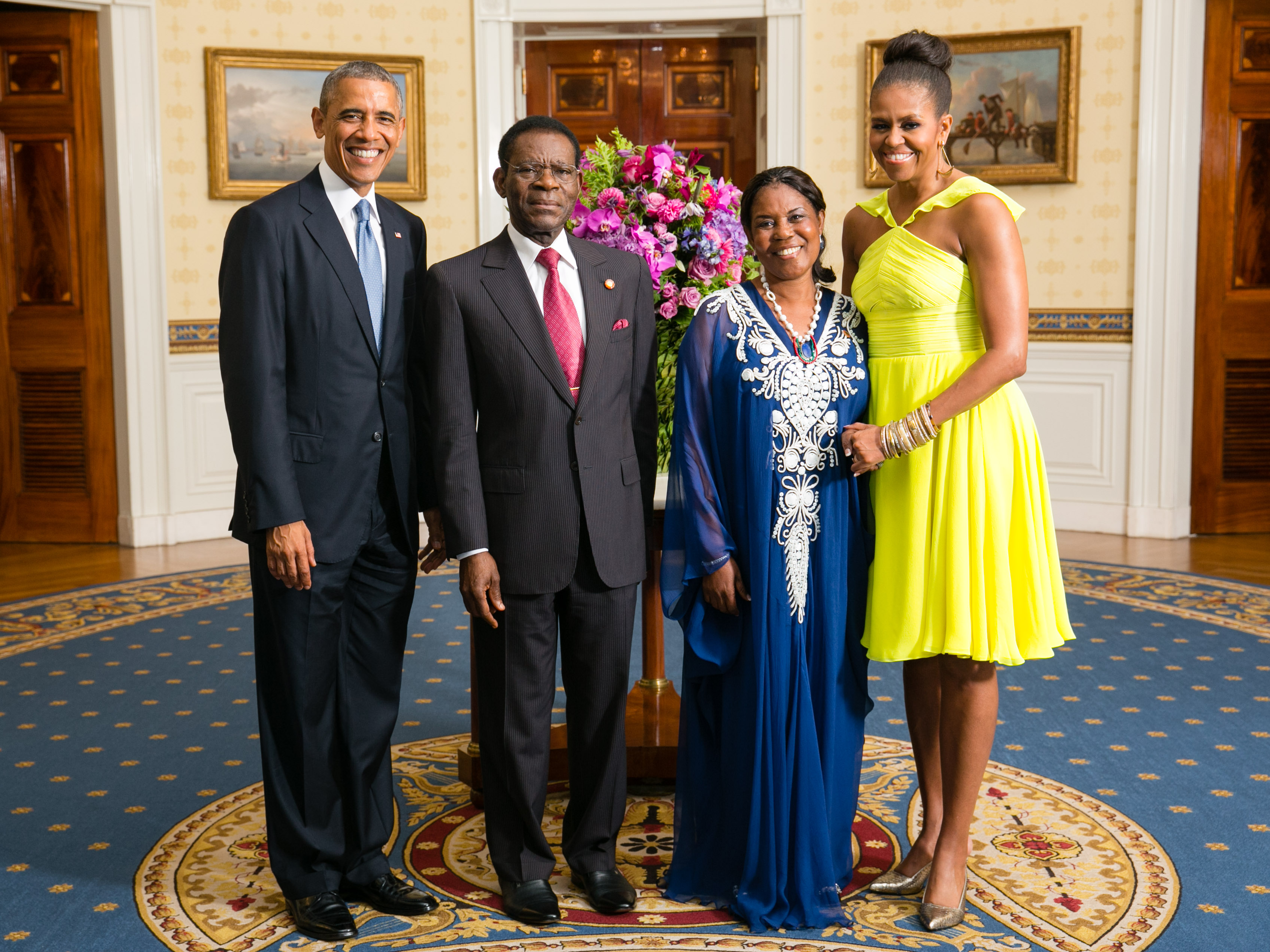
Obiang and US president Obama with their wives in 2014

The nephew of Macías Nguema, Teodoro Obiang deposed his uncle on 3 August 1979, in a bloody coup d'état; over two weeks of civil war ensued until Macías Nguema was captured. He was tried and executed soon afterward, with Obiang succeeding him as a less bloody, but still authoritarian president.

In 1995, Mobil, an American oil company, discovered oil in Equatorial Guinea. The country subsequently experienced rapid economic development, but earnings from the country's oil wealth have not reached the population and the country ranks low on the UN human development index. 7.9% of children die before the age of 5, and more than 50% of the population lacks access to clean drinking water. Obiang is widely suspected of using the country's oil wealth to enrich himself and his associates. In 2006, Forbes estimated his personal wealth at $600 million.

In 2011, the government announced it was planning a new capital for the country, named Oyala. The city was renamed Ciudad de la Paz ("City of Peace") in 2017.

As of May 2026, Obiang is Africa's longest serving leader. Equatorial Guinea was elected as a non-permanent member of the United Nations Security Council 2018–2019. On 7 March 2021, there were munition explosions at a military base near the city of Bata, causing 107 deaths. In November 2022, Obiang was re-elected in the 2022 Equatorial Guinean general election with 99.7% of the vote amid accusations of fraud by the opposition.

In 2024 it was published that mercenaries from the Wagner Group (now called "Africa Corps") had entered Equatorial Guinea at the request of Teodoro Obiang. According to opponents, the objective of the mercenaries was to help consolidate a hypothetical succession of Obiang's power to his son "Teodorín".

On 19 May 2025 the International Court of Justice (ICJ) granted Equatorial Guinea sovereignty over Mbanie Island, Cocoteros Island, and Conga Island in response to territorial claims that neighbouring Gabon had been making since 1972.

On 10 November 2025 it was reported that the second Trump administration had sent $7.5M to the government of Equatorial Guinea to accept non-citizen deportees from the United States, an amount far exceeding the total amount of US aid sent to the country in the past eight years according to Sen. Jeanne Shaheen of New Hampshire. As of September 2026, at least 12 persons sent to Equatorial Guinea have been returned to their home country, putting them at risk of persecution, torture, and violence. In May 2026, United Nations human rights experts have called for the immediate cessation of such arrangements and to avoid refoulement, a human rights violation under the 1951 Refugee Convention.

== Government and politics ==
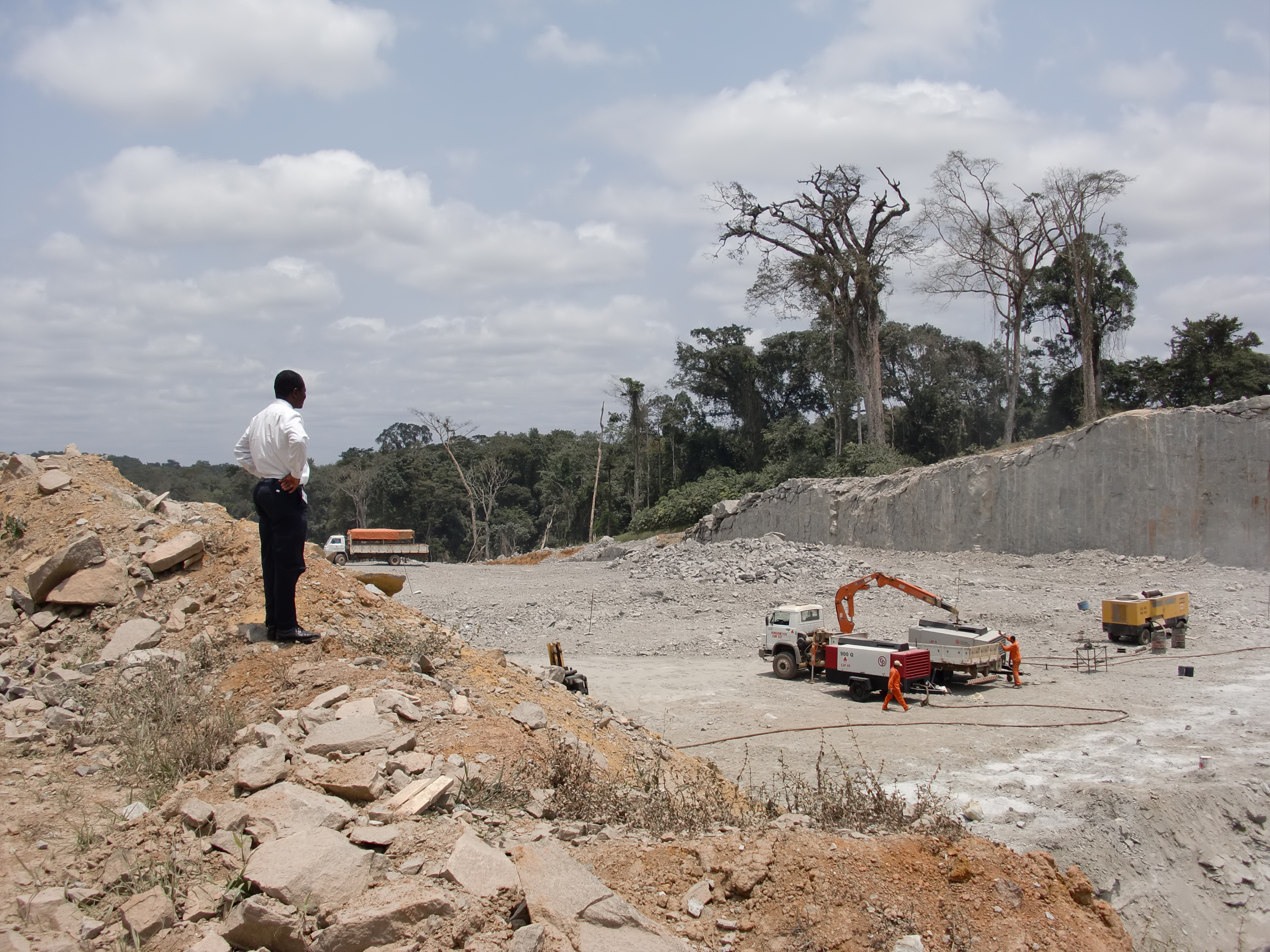
Highway construction in Ciudad de la Paz in 2010.

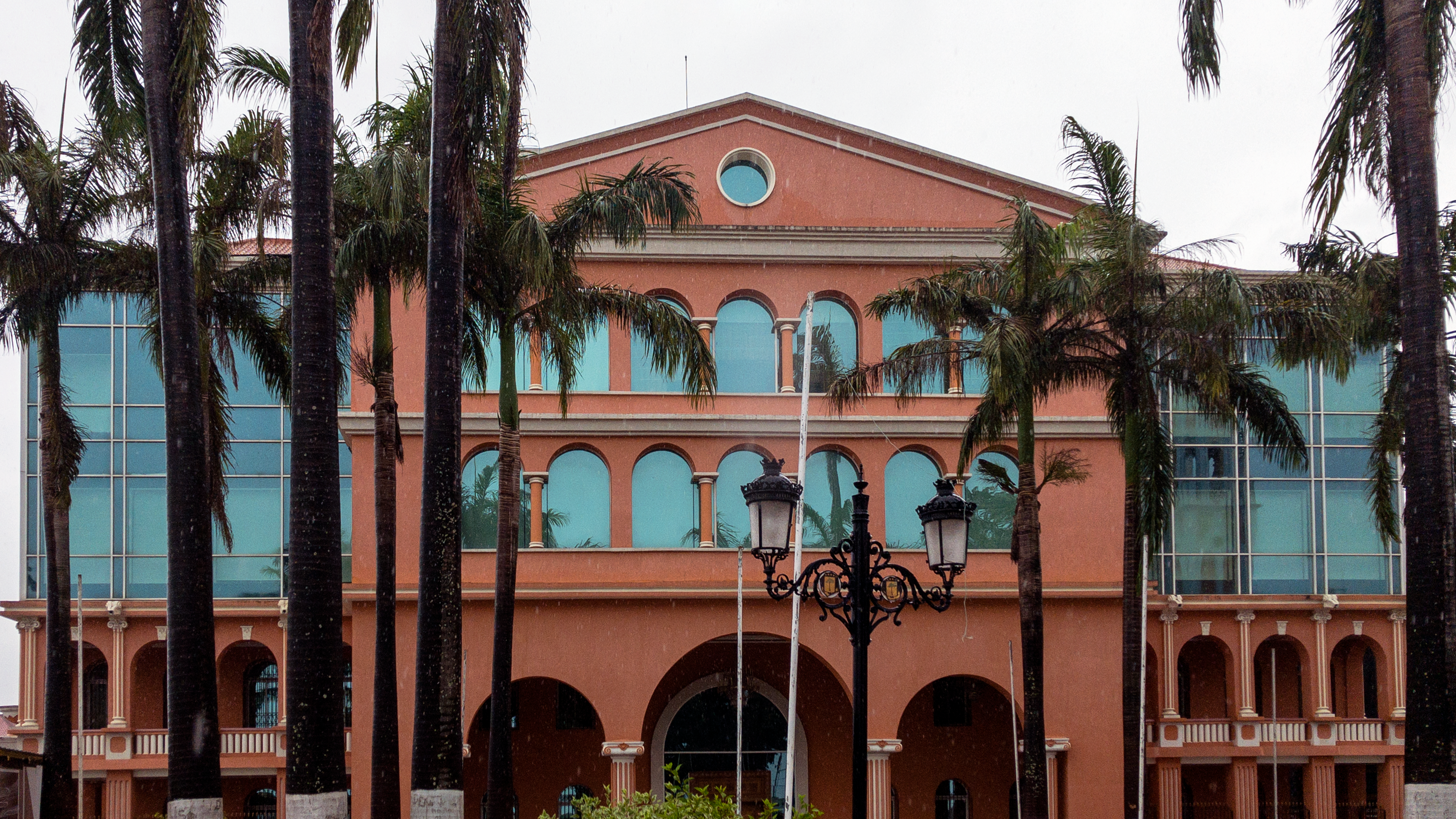
Presidential palace of Teodoro Obiang in Malabo

The current president of Equatorial Guinea is Teodoro Obiang. The 1982 constitution of Equatorial Guinea gives him extensive powers, including naming and dismissing members of the cabinet, making laws by decree, dissolving the Chamber of Representatives, negotiating and ratifying treaties and serving as commander in chief of the armed forces. The constitution defines the nation as a unitary state. According to Human Rights Watch, the dictatorship of President Obiang used an oil boom to entrench and enrich itself further at the expense of the country's people. Since August 1979, some 12 perceived unsuccessful coup attempts have occurred. According to a March 2004 BBC profile, politics within the country were dominated by tensions with Obiang's son, Teodoro Nguema Obiang Mangue.

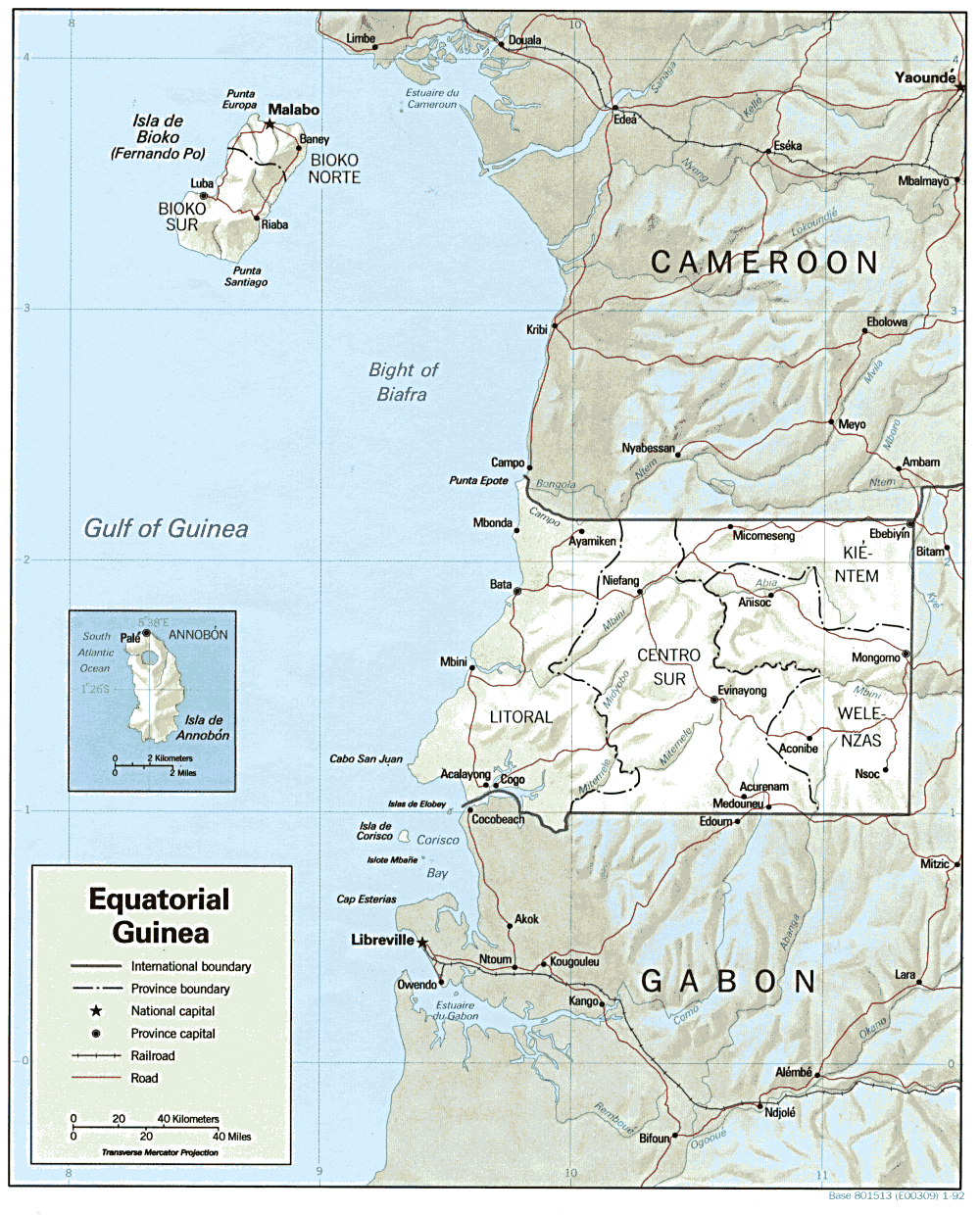
Map of Equatorial Guinea made by the CIA in 1992

In 2004, a planeload of suspected mercenaries was intercepted in Zimbabwe while allegedly on the way to overthrow Obiang. A November 2004 report named Mark Thatcher as a financial backer of the 2004 Equatorial Guinea coup d'état attempt organised by Simon Mann. Various accounts also named the United Kingdom's MI6, the United States' CIA, and Spain as tacit supporters of the coup attempt. Nevertheless, the Amnesty International report released in June 2005 on the ensuing trial of those allegedly involved highlighted the prosecution's failure to produce conclusive evidence that a coup attempt had actually taken place. Simon Mann was released from prison on 3 November 2009 for humanitarian reasons.

Since 2005, Military Professional Resources Inc., a US-based international private military company, has worked in Equatorial Guinea to train police forces in appropriate human rights practices. In 2006, US Secretary of State Condoleezza Rice hailed Obiang as a "good friend" despite repeated criticism of his human rights and civil liberties record. The US Agency for International Development entered into a memorandum of understanding (MOU) with Obiang in April 2006 to establish a social development fund in the country, implementing projects in the areas of health, education, women's affairs and the environment.

In 2006, Obiang signed an anti-torture decree banning all forms of abuse and improper treatment in Equatorial Guinea, and commissioned the renovation and modernization of Black Beach prison in 2007 to ensure the humane treatment of prisoners. However, human rights abuses have continued. Human Rights Watch and Amnesty International among other non-governmental organisations have documented severe human rights abuses in prisons, including torture, beatings, unexplained deaths and illegal detention. Obiang was re-elected to serve an additional term in 2009 in an election the African Union deemed "in line with electoral law". Obiang re-appointed Prime Minister Ignacio Milam Tang in 2010.

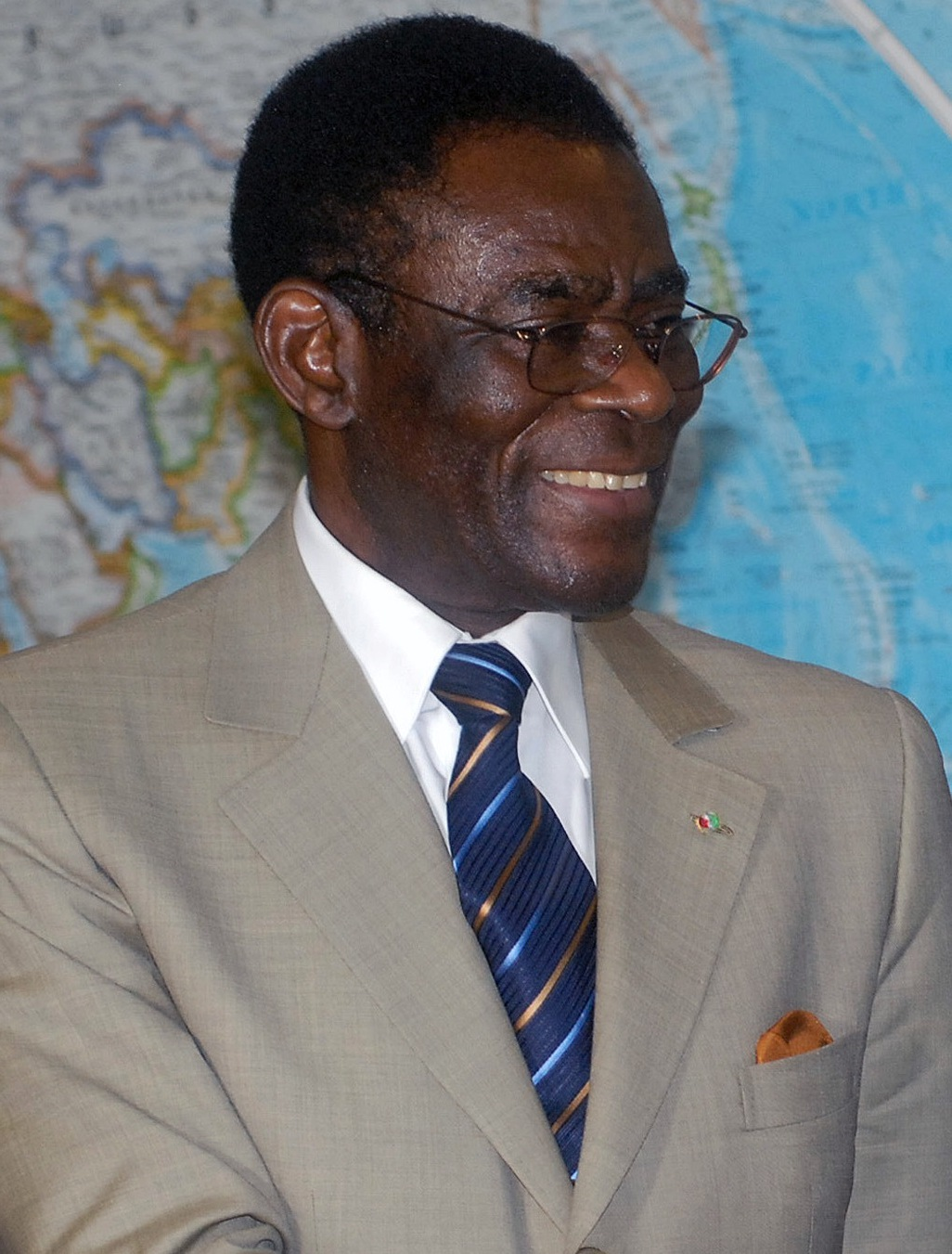
According to the BBC, President Obiang Nguema "has been described by rights organisations as one of Africa's most brutal dictators."

In November 2011, a new constitution was approved. The vote on the constitution was taken, though neither the text nor its content was revealed to the public before the vote. Under the new constitution, the president was limited to a maximum of two seven-year terms and would be both the head of state and head of the government, therefore eliminating the prime minister. The new constitution also introduced the figure of a vice president and called for the creation of a 70-member senate with 55 senators elected by the people and the 15 remaining designated by the president. In the following cabinet reshuffle, it was announced that there would be two vice presidents in clear violation of the constitution that was just taking effect.

In October 2012, during an interview with Christiane Amanpour on CNN, Obiang was asked whether he would step down at the end of the current term (2009–2016) since the new constitution limited the number of terms to two and he has been reelected at least 4 times. Obiang answered he refused to step aside because the new constitution was not retroactive and the two-term limit would only become applicable from 2016.

The elections on 26 May 2013 combined the senate, lower house and mayoral contests in a single package. Like all previous elections, this was denounced by the opposition, and it too was won by Obiang's PDGE. During the electoral contest, the ruling party hosted internal elections, which were later scrapped. Clara Nsegue Eyi and Natalia Angue Edjodjomo, coordinators of the Movimiento de Protesta Popular (People's Protest Movement), were arrested. They were detained on 13 May. They called for a peaceful protest at the Plaza de la Mujer square on 15 May. Coordinator Enrique Nsolo Nzo was also arrested and taken to Malabo Central Police Station. Nsolo Nzo was released later that day without charge.

Shortly after the elections, opposition party Convergence for Social Democracy (CPDS) announced that they were going to protest peacefully against the 26 May elections on 25 June. Interior minister Clemente Engonga refused to authorise the protest on the grounds that it could "destabilize" the country and CPDS decided to go forward, claiming constitutional right. On the night of 24 June, the CPDS headquarters in Malabo were surrounded by heavily armed police officers to keep those inside from leaving and thus effectively blocking the protest. Several leading members of CPDS were detained in Malabo and others in Bata were kept from boarding several local flights to Malabo.

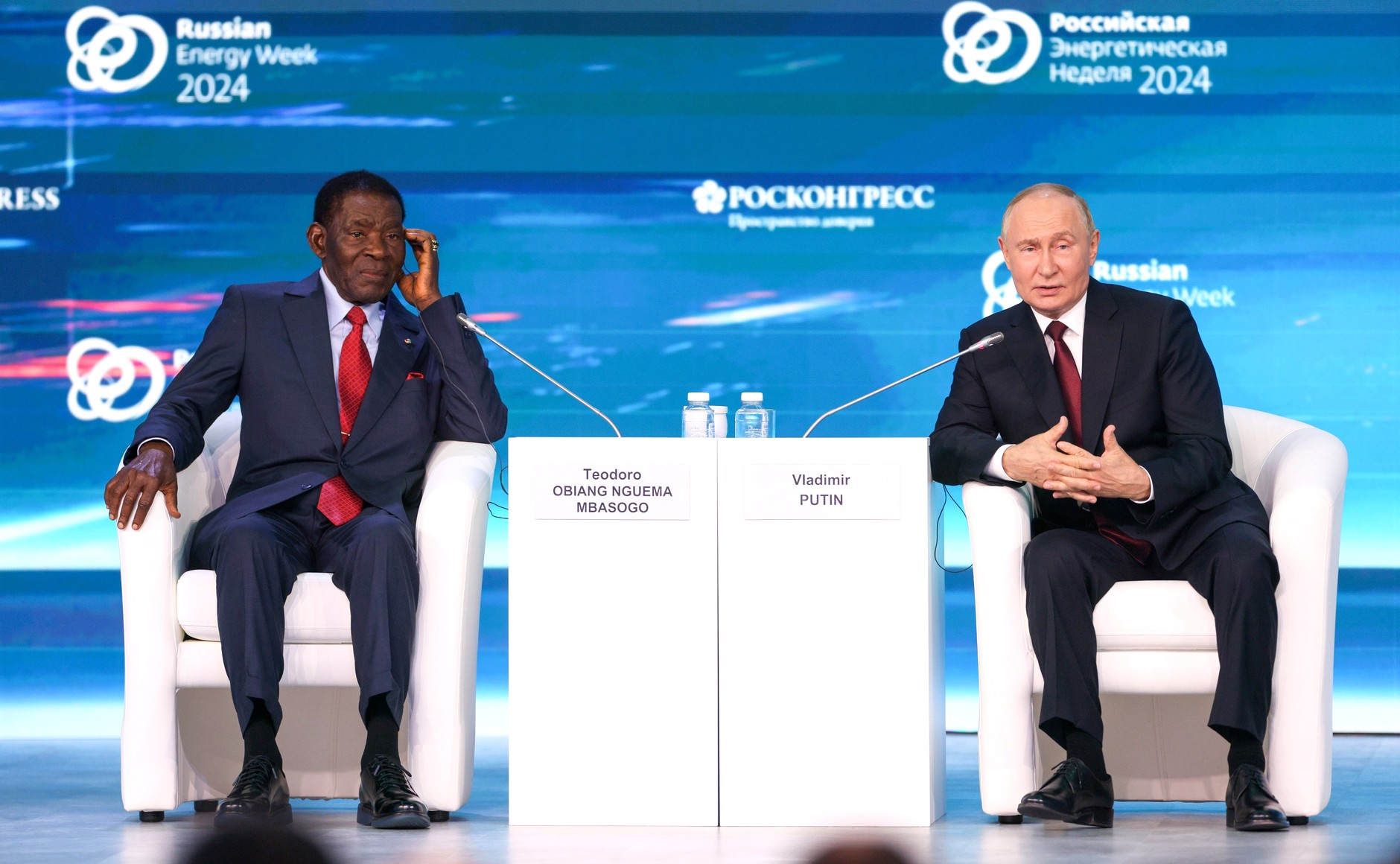
Obiang with Russian President Vladimir Putin on 26 September 2024

In 2016, Obiang was reelected for an additional seven-year term in an election that, according to Freedom House, was plagued by police violence, detentions and torture against opposition factions.

Following the 2022 general elections, President Obiang's Democratic Party of Equatorial Guinea holds all of the 100 seats in the Chamber of Deputies and all of those in the Senate. The opposition is almost non-existent in the country and is organised from Spain mainly within the social-democratic Convergence for Social Democracy. Most of the media are under state control; the private television channels, those of the Asonga group, belong to the president's family.

In their 2024 publishing, Transparency International awarded Equatorial Guinea a total score of 13 on their Corruption Perceptions Index (CPI). CPI ranks countries by their perceived level of public corruption where zero is very corrupt and 100 is extremely clean. Equatorial Guinea was ranked 173rd out of a total of 180 countries. Freedom House, a pro-democracy and human rights NGO, described Obiang as one of the world's "most kleptocratic living autocrats", and complained about the US government welcoming his administration and buying oil from it. According to 2023 V-Dem Democracy indices, Equatorial Guinea is the 7th least democratic country in Africa.

=== Armed forces ===
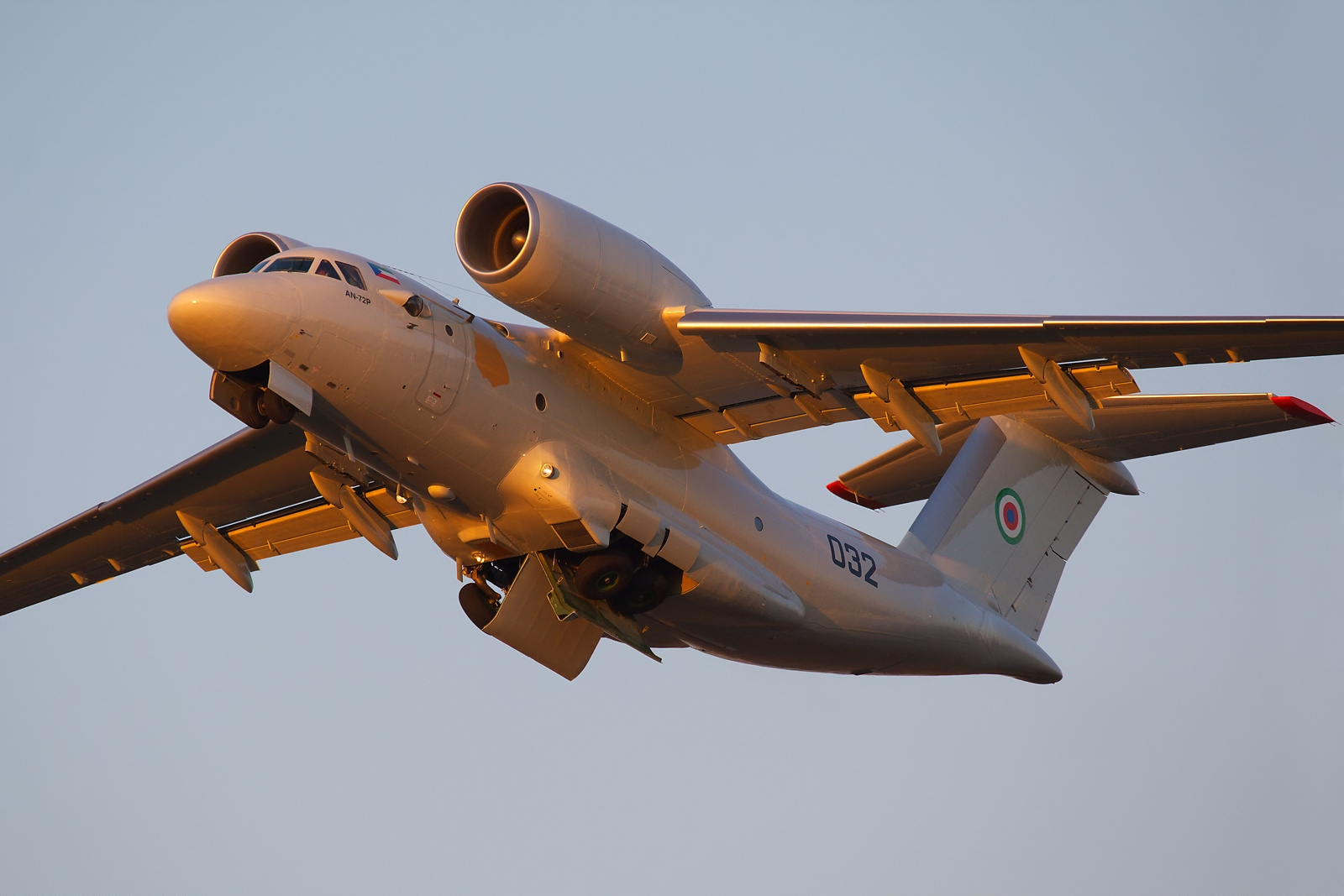
An Antonov An-72P of the Armed Forces of Equatorial Guinea on liftoff

The Armed Forces of Equatorial Guinea consists of approximately 2,500 service members. The army has almost 1,400 soldiers, the police 400 paramilitary men, the navy 200 service members, and the air force about 120 members. There is also a gendarmerie, but the number of members is unknown.

According to the 2024 Global Peace Index, Equatorial Guinea is the 94th most peaceful country in the world.

== Geography ==
Equatorial Guinea is on the west coast of Central Africa. The country consists of a mainland territory, Río Muni, which is bordered by Cameroon to the north and Gabon to the east and south, and five small islands, Bioko, Corisco, Annobón, Elobey Chico (Small Elobey), and Elobey Grande (Great Elobey). Bioko, lies about 40 kilometers (25 mi) off the coast of Cameroon. Annobón Island is about 350 kilometers (220 mi) west-south-west of Cape Lopez in Gabon. Corisco and the two Elobey islands are in Corisco Bay, on the border of Río Muni and Gabon.

Equatorial Guinea lies between latitudes 4°N and 2°S, and longitudes 5° and 12°E. Despite its name, no part of the country's territory lies on the equator—it is in the northern hemisphere, except for the insular Annobón Province, which is about 155 km (96 mi) south of the equator.

=== Climate ===
Köppen climate classification of Equatorial Guinea

Equatorial Guinea has a tropical climate with distinct wet and dry seasons. From June to August, Río Muni is dry and Bioko wet; from December to February, the reverse occurs. In between it, there is a gradual transition. Rain or mist occurs daily on Annobón, where a cloudless day has never been registered. The temperature at Malabo, Bioko, ranges from 16 °C (61 °F) to 33 °C (91 °F), though on the southern Moka Plateau, normal high temperatures are only 21 °C (70 °F). In Río Muni, the average temperature is about 27 °C (81 °F). Annual rainfall varies from 1,930 mm (76 in) at Malabo to 10,920 mm (430 in) at Ureka, Bioko, but Río Muni is somewhat drier.

=== Ecology ===
Share of forest area in total land area, top countries (2021). Equatorial Guinea has the seventh highest percentage of forest cover in the world.

Equatorial Guinea spans several ecoregions. Río Muni region lies within the Atlantic Equatorial coastal forests ecoregion except for patches of Central African mangroves on the coast, especially in the Muni River estuary. The Cross-Sanaga-Bioko coastal forests ecoregion covers most of Bioko and the adjacent portions of Cameroon and Nigeria on the African mainland, and the Mount Cameroon and Bioko montane forests ecoregion covers the highlands of Bioko and nearby Mount Cameroon. The São Tomé, Príncipe, and Annobón moist lowland forests ecoregion covers all of Annobón, as well as São Tomé and Príncipe.

The country had a 2018 Forest Landscape Integrity Index mean score of 7.99/10, ranking it 30th globally out of 172 countries.

Ecology of Equatorial Guinea

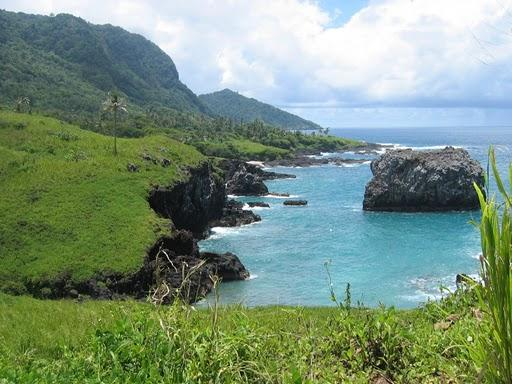
Annobon

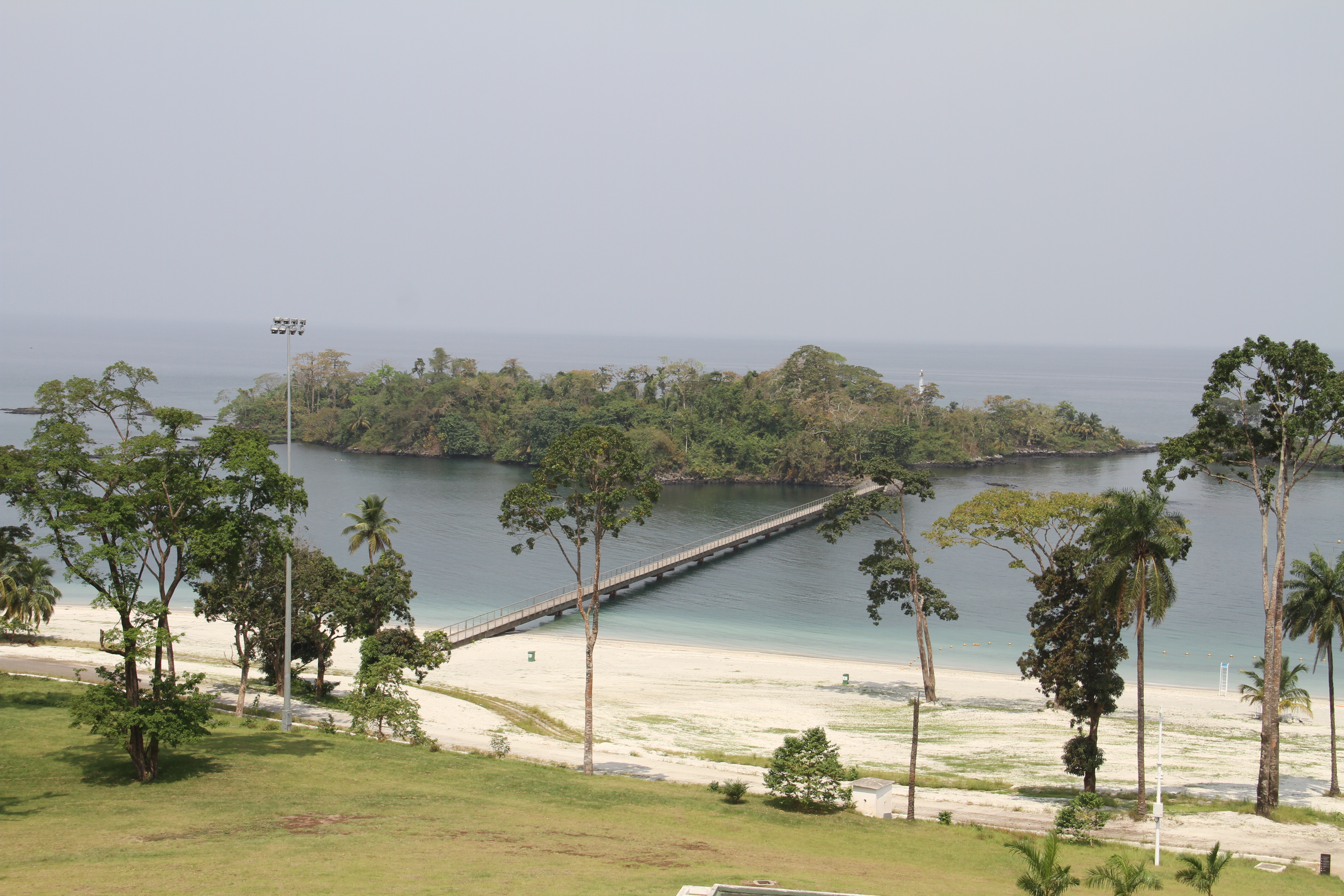
Islote Horacio

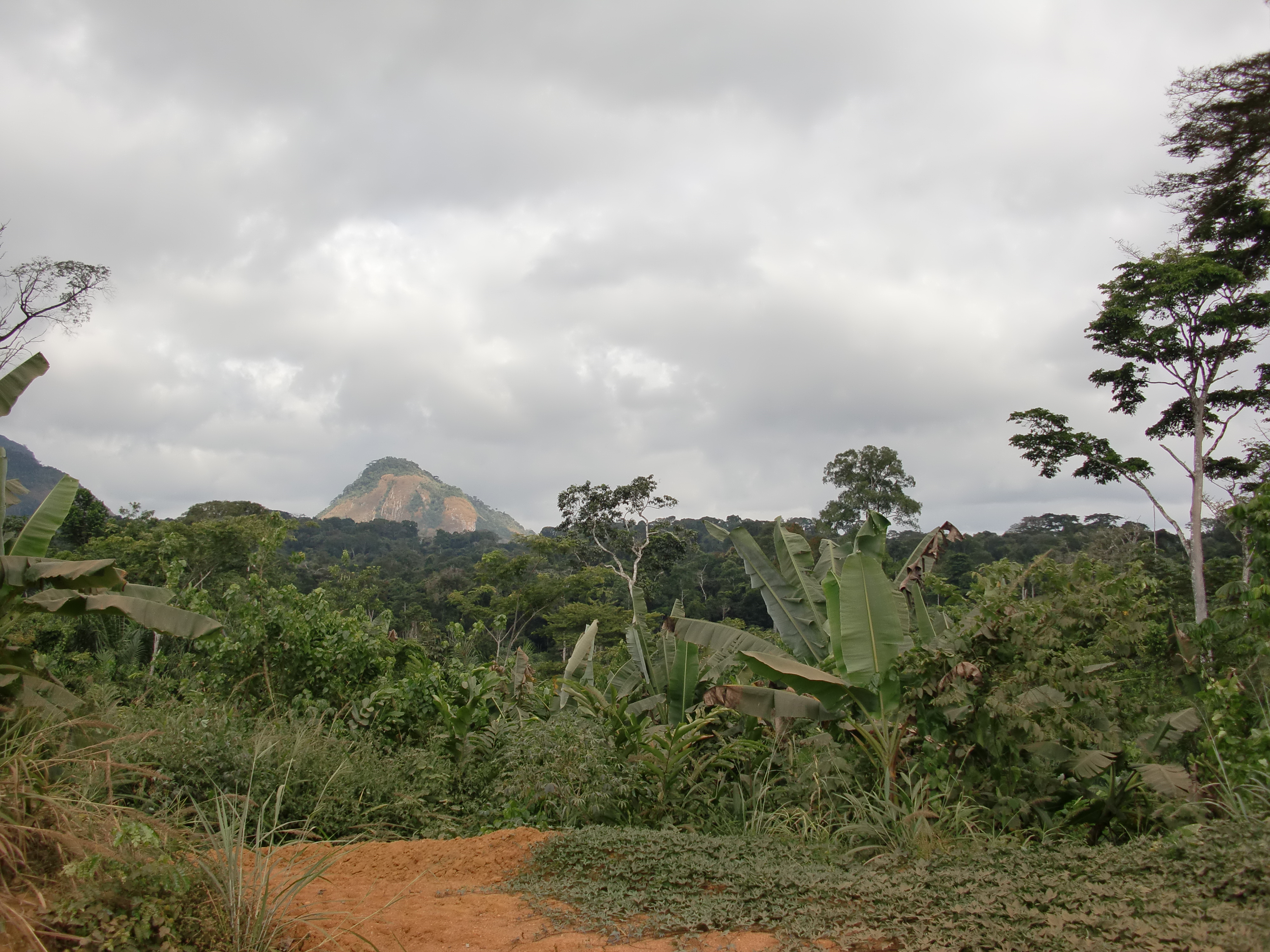
Near Ciudad de la Paz

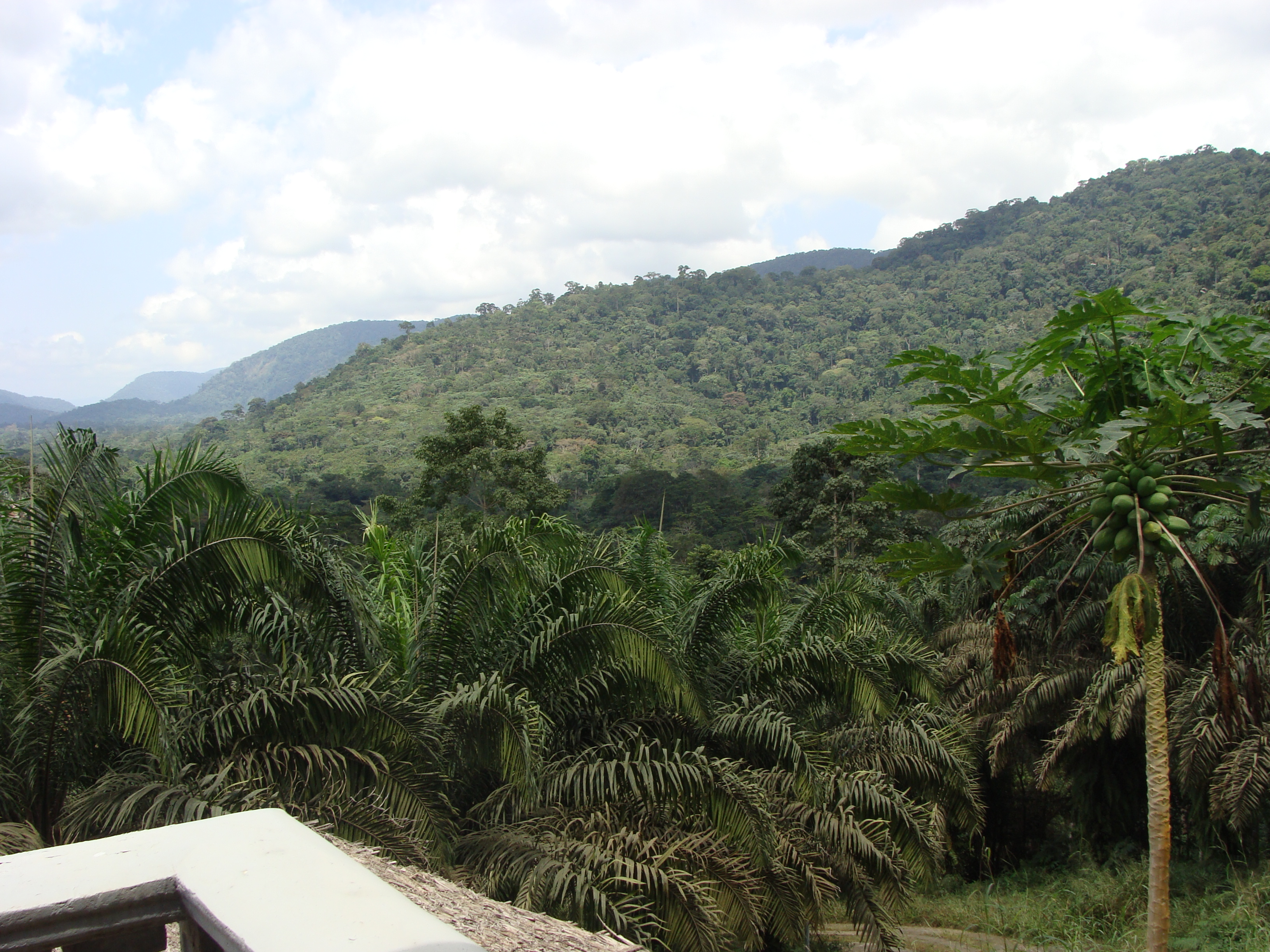
Monte Alén National Park

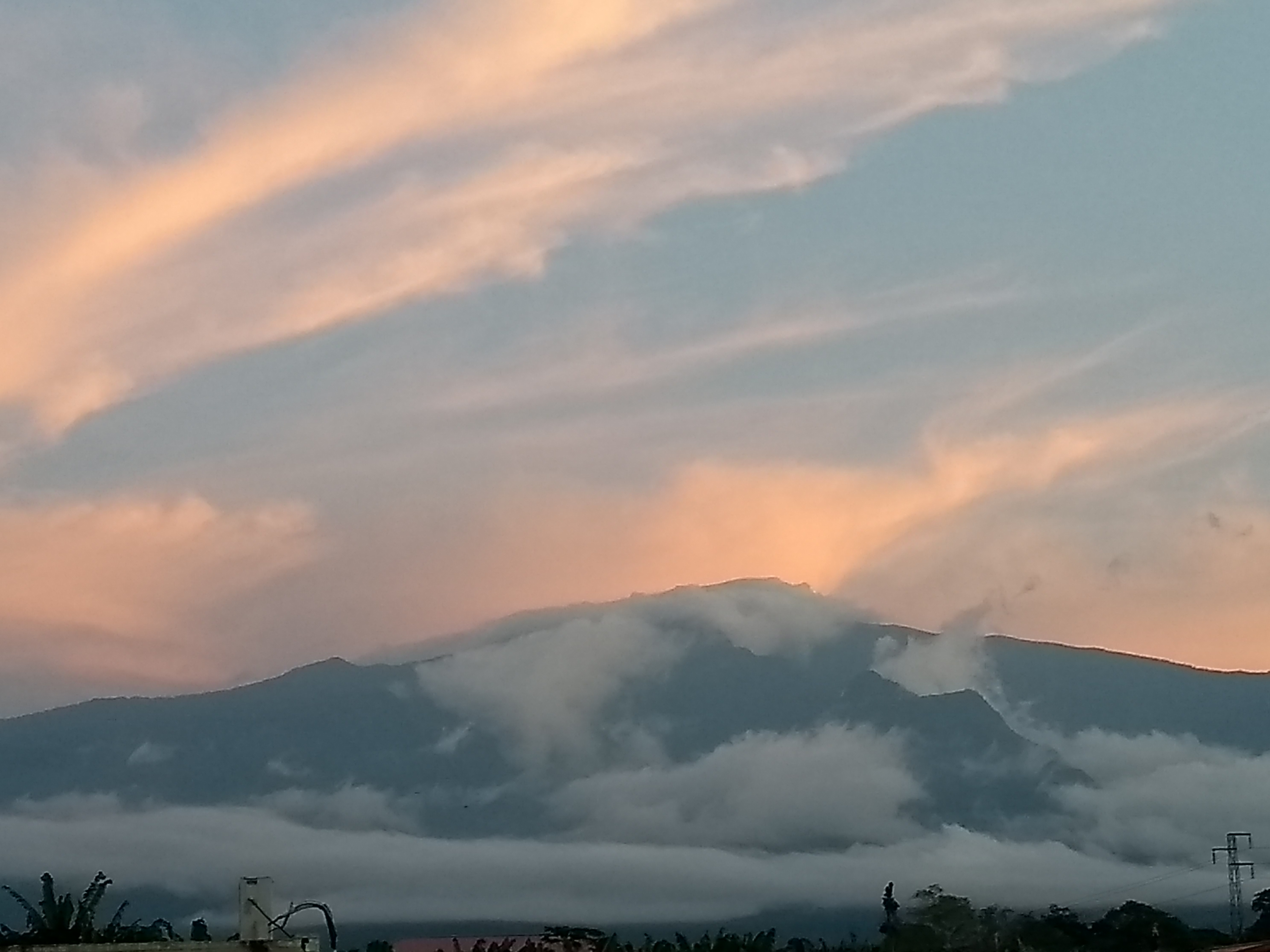
Pico Basilé

==== Wildlife ====
Equatorial Guinea is home to gorillas, chimpanzees, various monkeys, leopards, buffalo, antelope, elephants, hippopotamuses, crocodiles, and various snakes, including pythons.

Wildlife of Equatorial Guinea

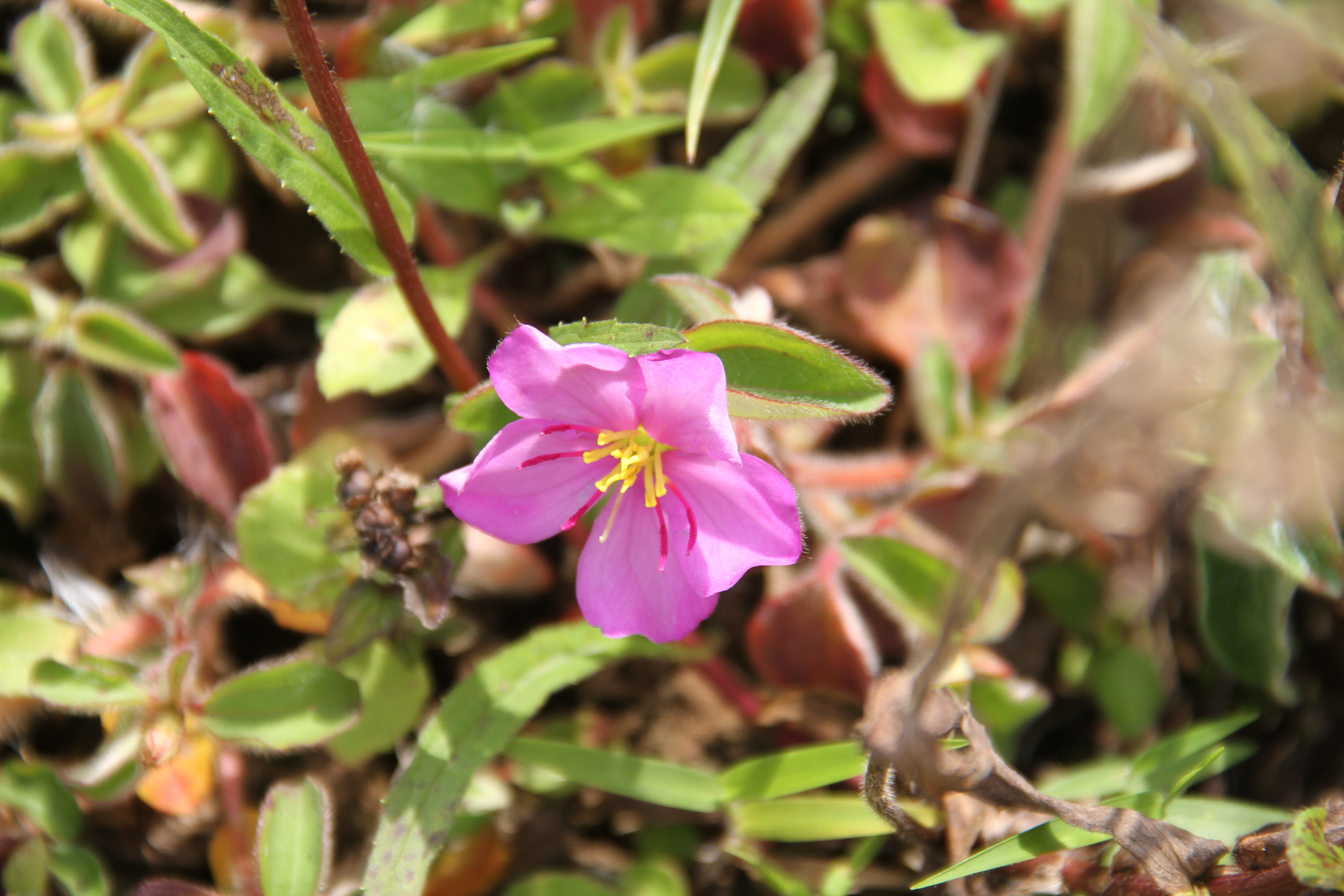
Dissotis

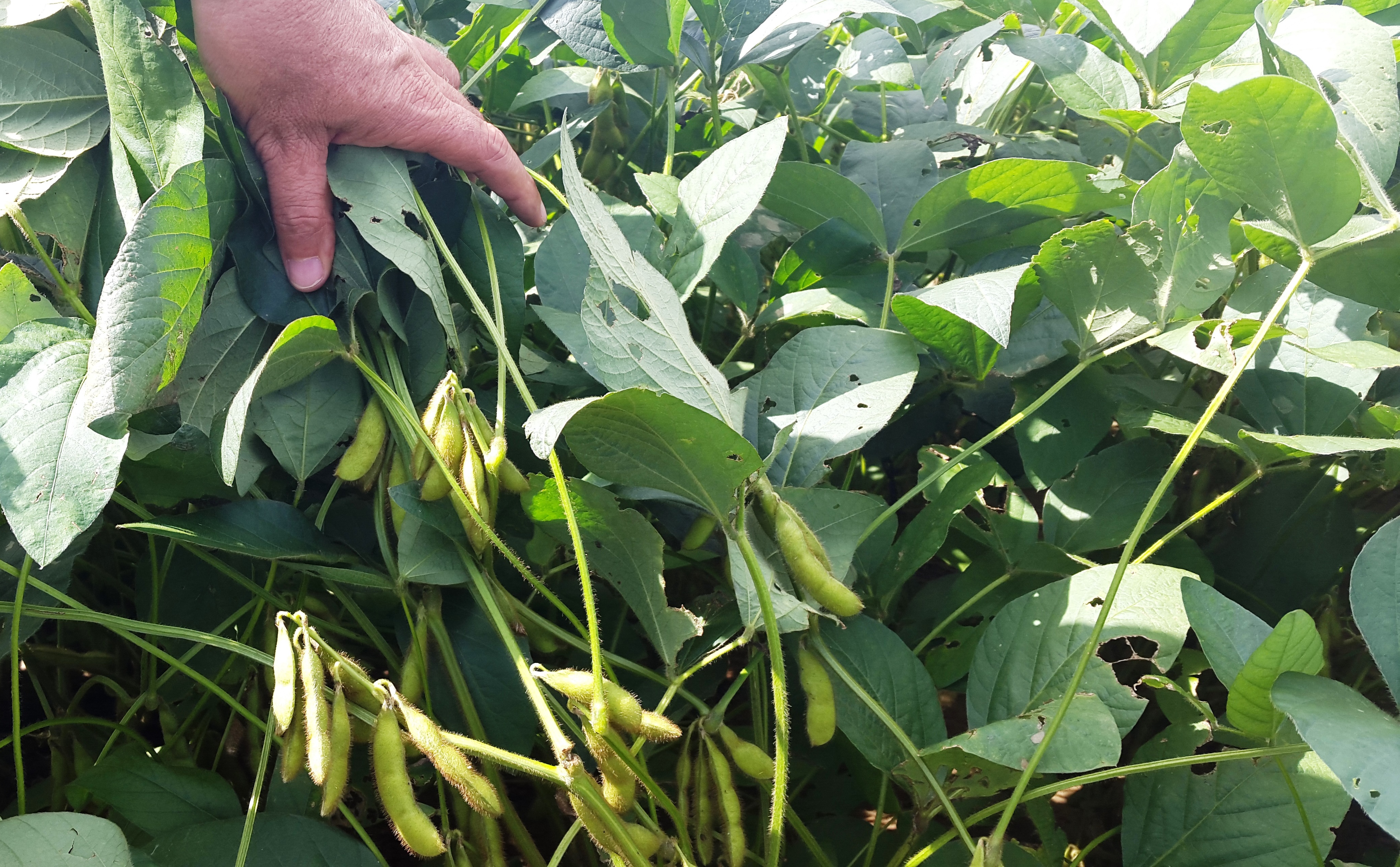
Soybean

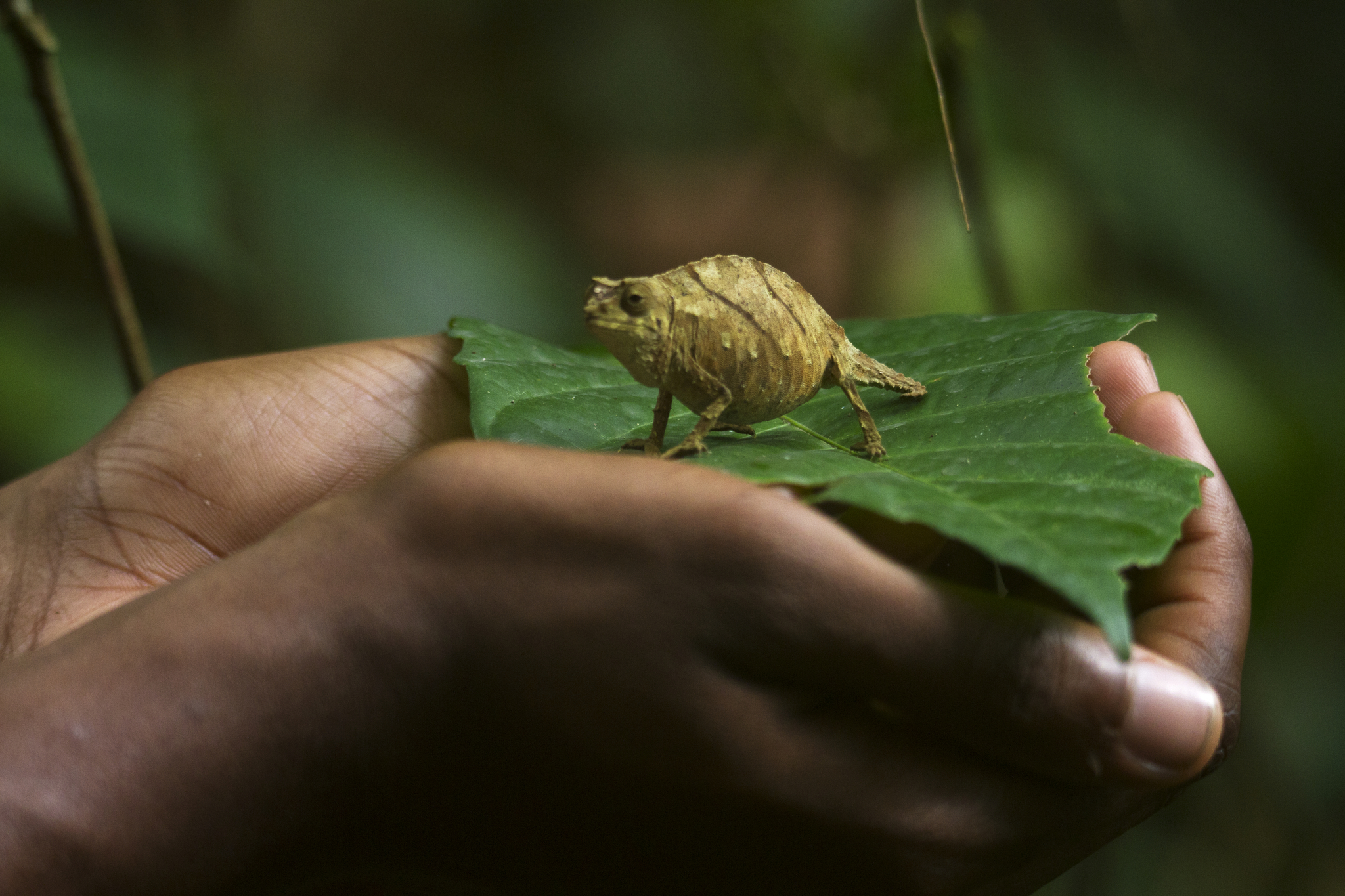
Spectral pygmy chameleon

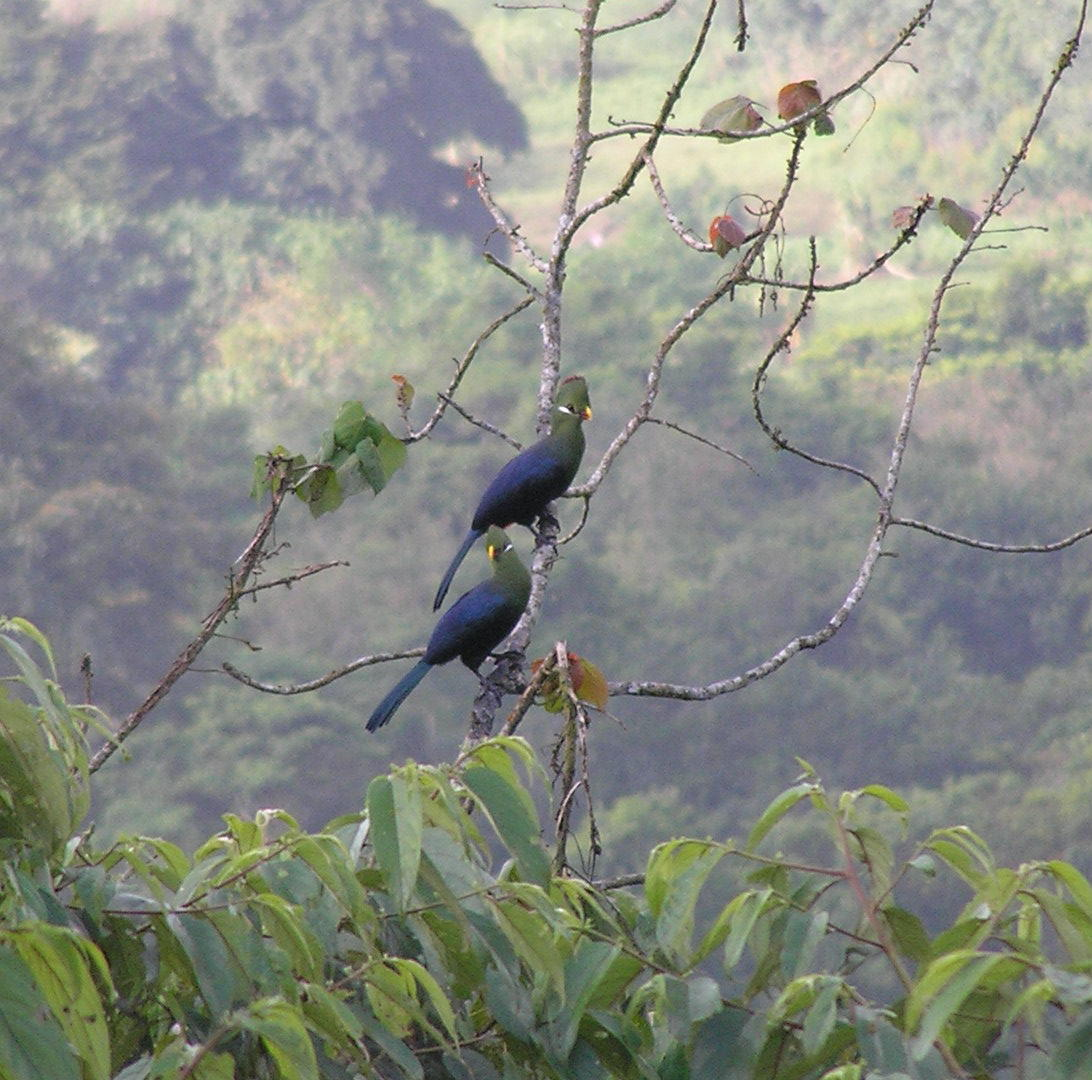
Yellow-billed turaco

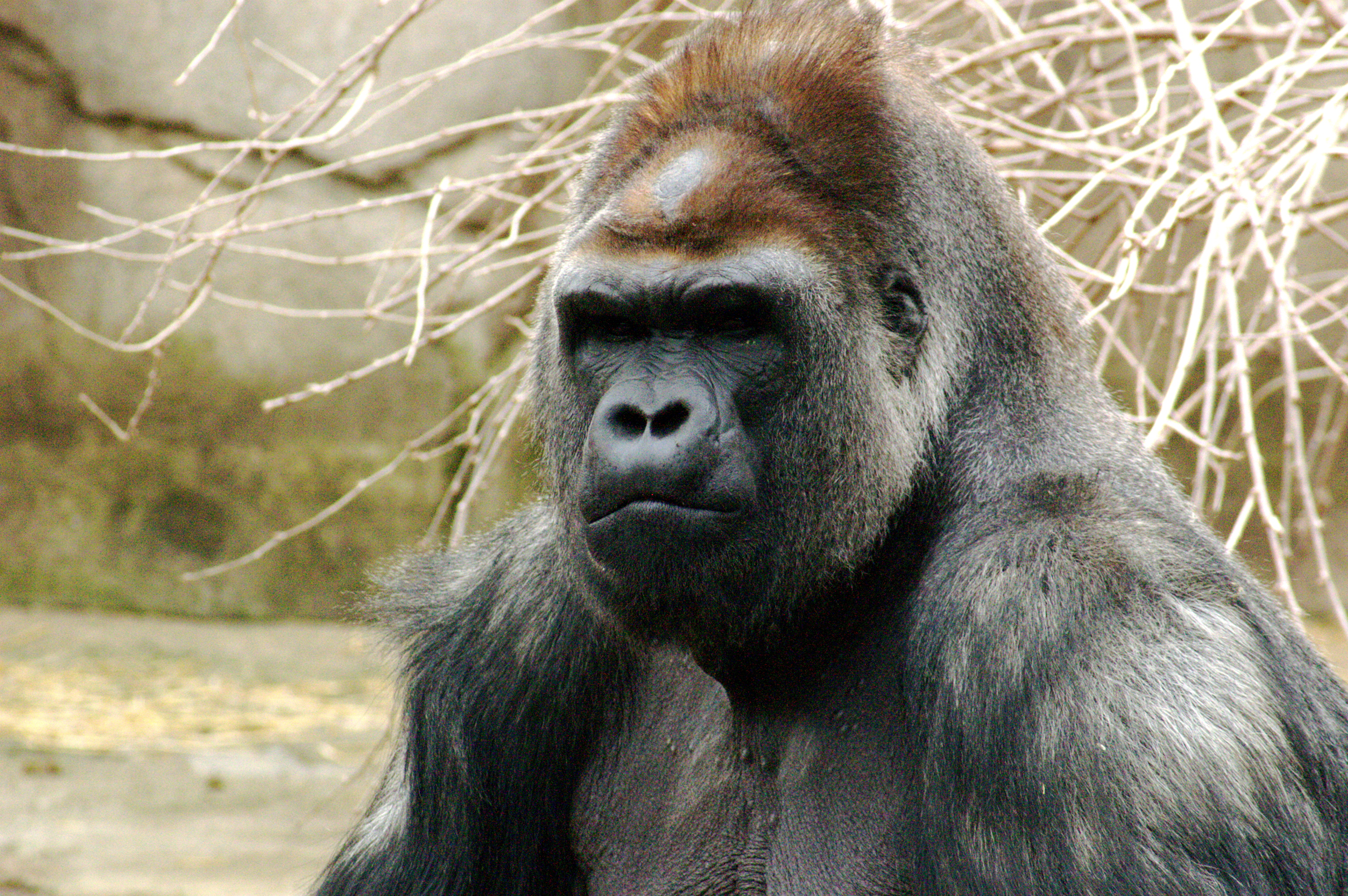
Western gorilla

=== Administrative divisions ===
A clickable map of Equatorial Guinea exhibiting its two regions and eight provinces. The island nation of São Tomé and Príncipe is not part of Equatorial Guinea.

Equatorial Guinea is divided into eight provinces. The newest province is Djibloho, created in 2017 with its headquarters at Ciudad de la Paz, the country's capital. The eight provinces are as follows (numbers correspond to those on the map; provincial capitals appear in parentheses):

1. Annobón (San Antonio de Palé)
2. Bioko Norte (Malabo)
3. Bioko Sur (Luba)
4. Centro Sur (Evinayong)
5. Djibloho (Ciudad de la Paz)
6. Kié-Ntem (Ebebiyín)
7. Litoral (Bata)
8. Wele-Nzas (Mongomo)

The provinces are further divided into 19 districts and 37 municipalities.

== Economy ==
Before the nation's independence from Spain, Equatorial Guinea exported cocoa, coffee and timber, mostly to its colonial ruler, Spain, but also to Germany and the UK. On 1 January 1985, the country became the first non-Francophone African member of the franc zone, adopting the CFA franc as its currency. The national currency, the ekwele, had previously been linked to the Spanish peseta.

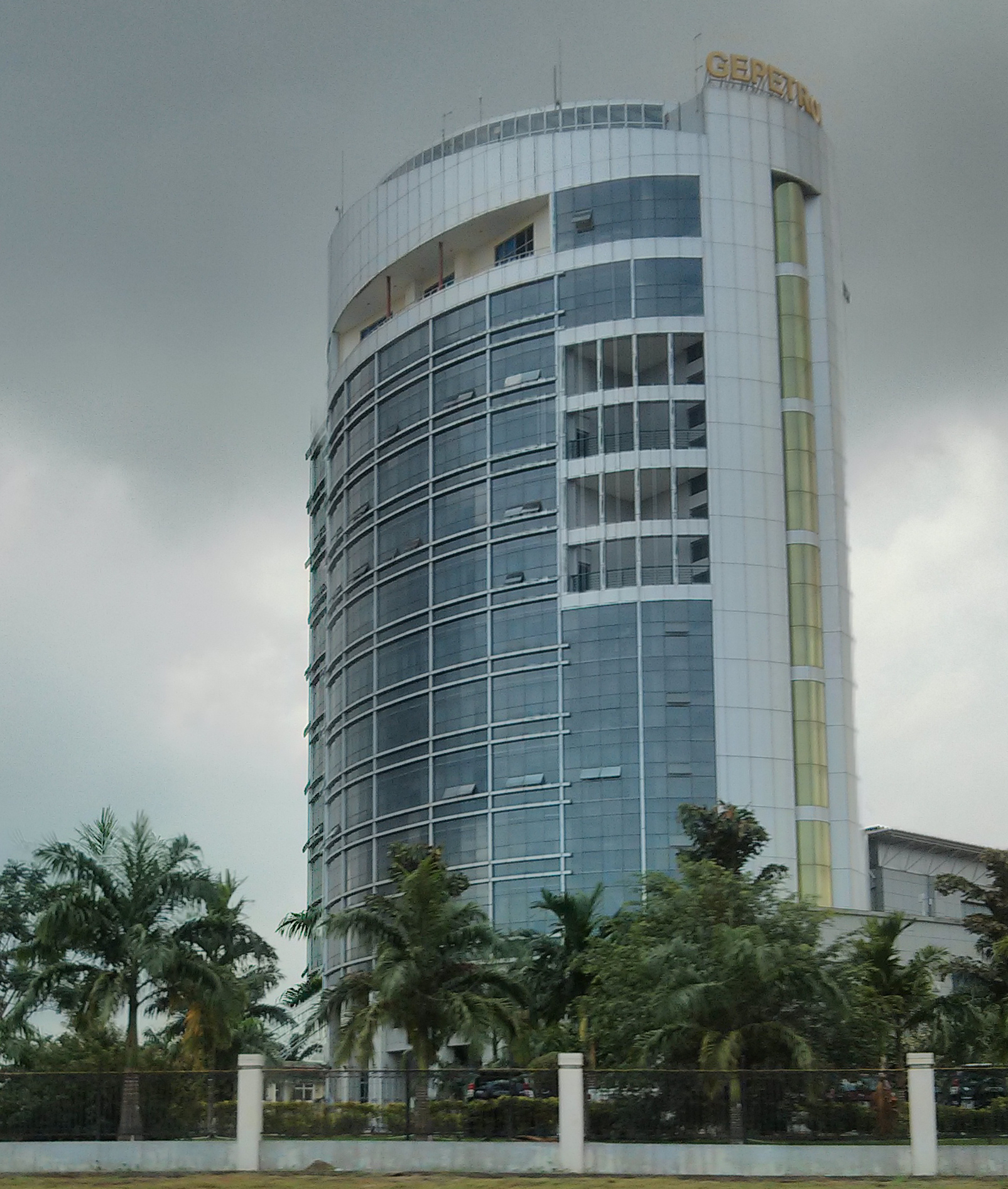
Gepetrol Tower in Malabo, 2013

The discovery of large oil reserves in 1996 and its subsequent exploitation contributed to a dramatic increase in government revenue. As of 2004, Equatorial Guinea is the third-largest oil producer in Sub-Saharan Africa. Its oil production has risen to 360,000 barrels per day (57,000 m^{3}/d), up from 220,000 only two years earlier. Oil companies operating in Equatorial Guinea include ExxonMobil, Marathon Oil, Kosmos Energy and Chevron.

In July 2004, the United States Senate published an investigation into Riggs Bank, a Washington, D.C.-based bank into which most of Equatorial Guinea's oil revenues were paid until recently, and which also banked for Chile's Augusto Pinochet. The Senate report showed at least $35 million siphoned off by Obiang, his family and regime senior officials. The president has denied any wrongdoing. Riggs Bank in February 2005 paid $9 million in restitution for Pinochet's banking, but no restitution was made with regard to Equatorial Guinea.

Forestry, farming, and fishing are also major components of the country's gross domestic product (GDP). Subsistence farming predominates. Agriculture is the country's main source of employment, providing income for 57% of rural households and employment for 52% of the workforce. From 2000 to 2010, Equatorial Guinea had the highest average annual increase in GDP, 17%.

Equatorial Guinea is a member of the Organization for the Harmonization of Business Law in Africa (OHADA). Equatorial Guinea is also a member of the Central African Monetary and Economic Union (CEMAC), a subregion that comprises more than 50 million people. Equatorial Guinea tried to be validated as an Extractive Industries Transparency Initiative (EITI)-compliant country. The country obtained candidate status on 22 February 2008; when Equatorial Guinea applied to extend the deadline for completing EITI's validation, the EITI Board did not agree to the extension.

Torre de La Libertad ("Freedom Tower")

According to the World Bank, Equatorial Guinea has the highest gross national income (GNI) per capita of any African country, 83 times larger than the GNI per capita of Burundi, the poorest country. However, Equatorial Guinea has extreme poverty brought about by wealth inequality. According to the 2016 United Nations Human Development Report, Equatorial Guinea had a GDP per capita of $21,517, one of the highest levels of wealth in Africa. However, it is one of the most unequal countries in the world according to the Gini index, with 70 per cent of the population living on one dollar a day. The country ranks 145th out of 189 on the United Nations Human Development Index in 2019.

Hydrocarbons account for 97% of the state's exports, and it is a member of the African Petroleum Producers Organization. In 2020, it faced its eighth year of recession, due in part to endemic corruption. The economy of Equatorial Guinea was expected to grow about 2.6% in 2021, a projection that was based on the successful completion of a large gas project and the recovery of the world economy by the second half of the year. But the country is expected to return to recession in 2022, with a real GDP decline of about 4.4%. In 2022, the country's Gini coefficient was 58.8.

== Transportation ==
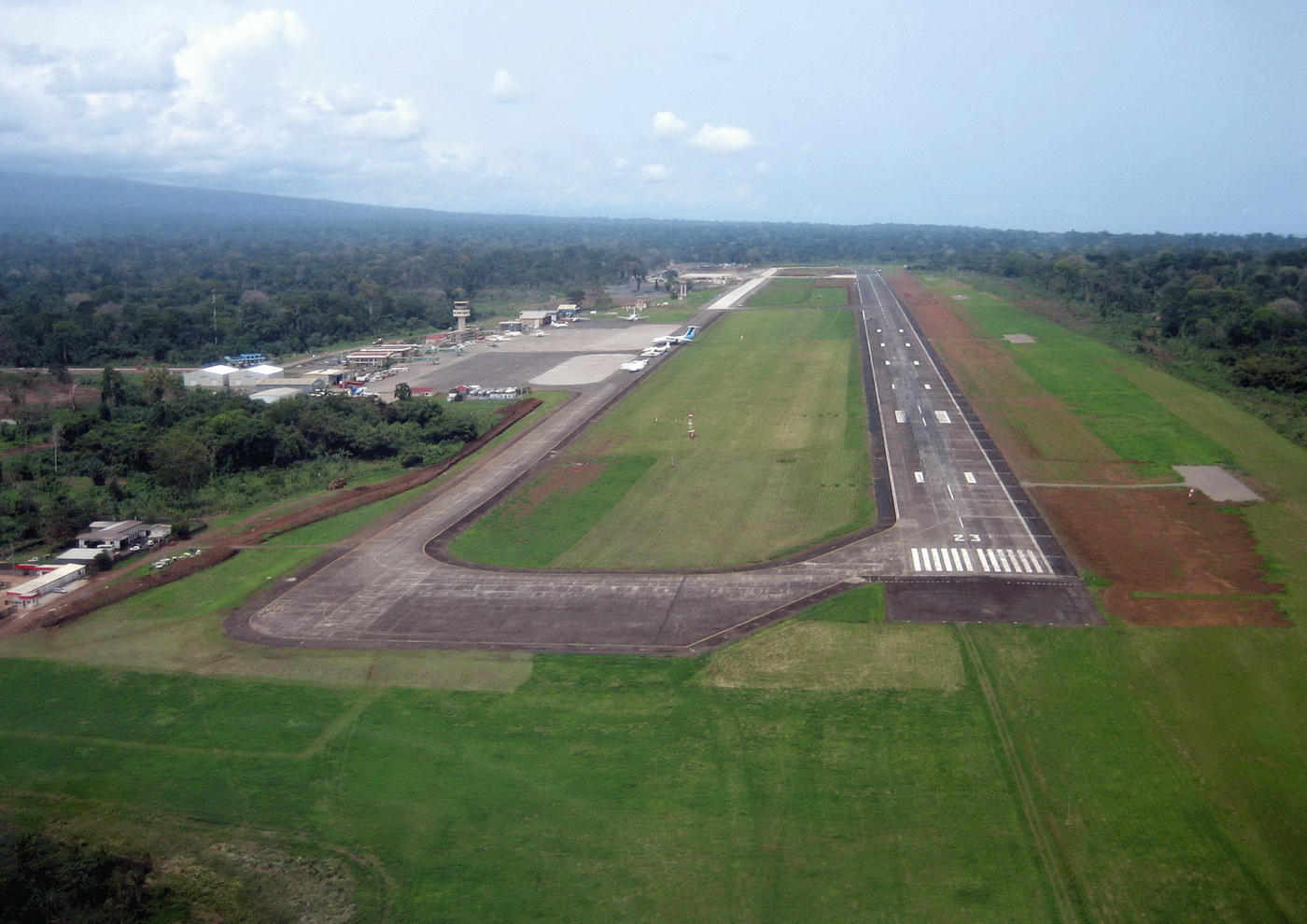
Malabo International Airport (Aeropuerto de Malabo in Spanish), in Punta Europa, island of Bioko

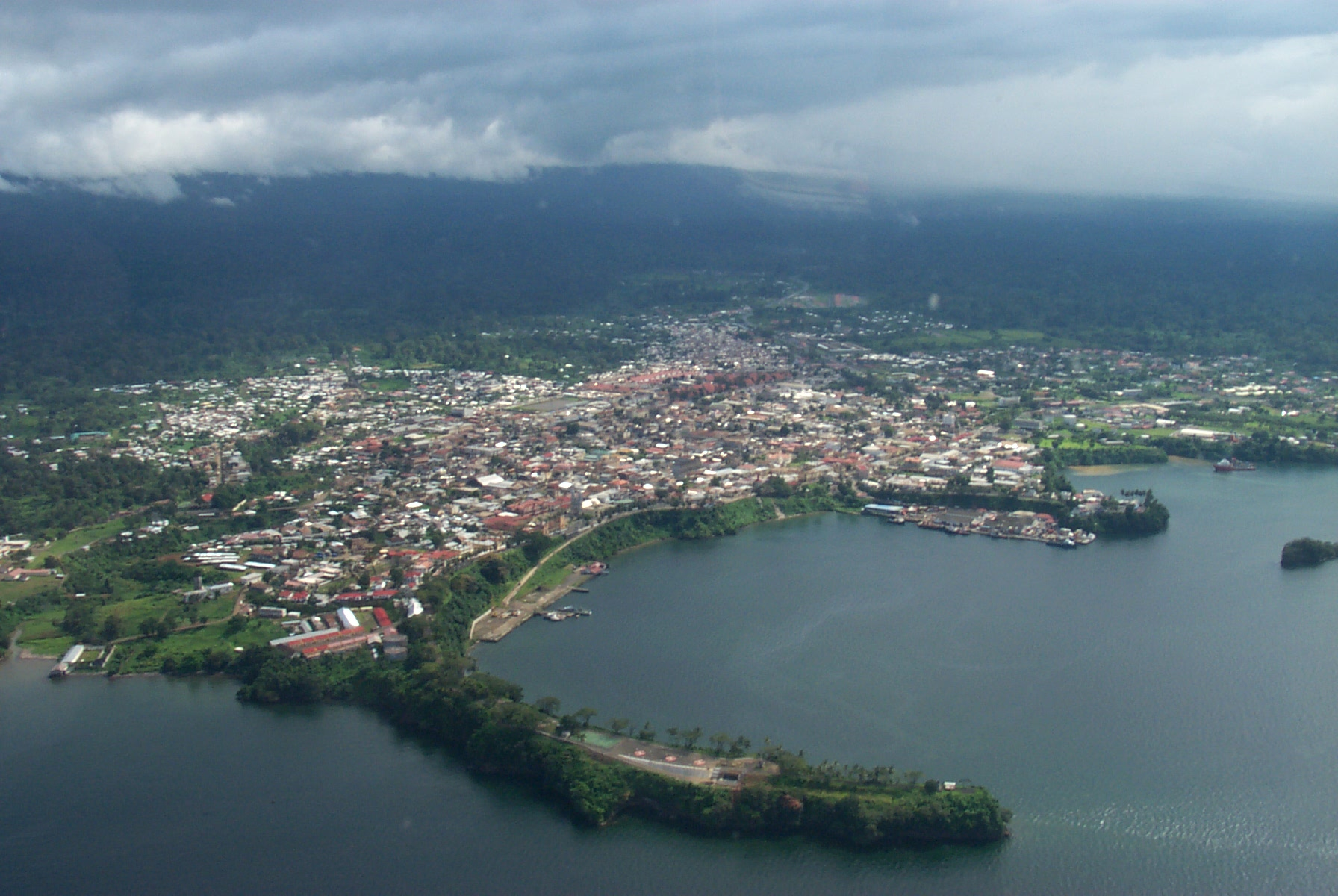
The port of Malabo

Due to the large oil industry in the country, internationally recognised carriers flew to Malabo International Airport, which, in May 2014, had several direct connections to Europe and West Africa. There are several airports in Equatorial Guinea, including Malabo International Airport, Bata Airport, President Obiang Nguema International Airport serving the country's capital, and Annobón Airport on the island of Annobón.

Every airline registered in Equatorial Guinea appears on the list of air carriers prohibited in the European Union (EU), which means that they are banned from operating services of any kind within the EU.

== Demographics ==
Timeline of the Equatoguinean population between 1960 and 2017. Population in thousands of inhabitants.

Population in Equatorial Guinea
Year	Million
1950	0.2
2000	0.6
2020	1.4

The majority of the people of Equatorial Guinea are of Bantu origin. The largest ethnic group, the Fang, is indigenous to the mainland, but substantial migration to Bioko Island since the 20th century means the Fang population exceeds that of the earlier Bubi inhabitants. The Fang constitute 80% of the population and comprise around 67 clans. Those in the northern part of Río Muni speak Fang-Ntumu, while those in the south speak Fang-Okah; the two dialects have differences but are mutually intelligible. Dialects of Fang are also spoken in parts of neighbouring Cameroon (Bulu) and Gabon. These dialects, while still intelligible, are more distinct. The Bubi, who constitute 15% of the population, are indigenous to Bioko Island. The traditional demarcation line between Fang and 'Beach' (inland) ethnic groups was the village of Niefang (limit of the Fang), east of Bata.

Coastal ethnic groups, sometimes referred to as Ndowe or "Playeros" (Beach People in Spanish): Combes, Bujebas, Balengues, and Bengas on the mainland and small islands, and Fernandinos, a Krio community on Bioko Island together comprise 5% of the population. Europeans (largely of Spanish or Portuguese descent, some with partial African ancestry) also live in the country, but most ethnic Spaniards left after independence.

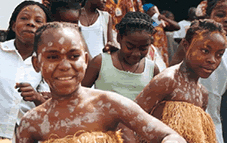
Equatorial Guinean children of Bubi descent

A growing number of foreigners from neighbouring Cameroon, Nigeria, and Gabon have immigrated to the country. According to the Encyclopedia of the Stateless Nations (2002) 7% of Bioko islanders were Igbo. Equatorial Guinea received Asians and native Africans from other countries as workers on cocoa and coffee plantations. Other black Africans came from Liberia, Angola, and Mozambique. Most of the Asian population is Chinese, with small numbers of Indians.

=== Languages ===
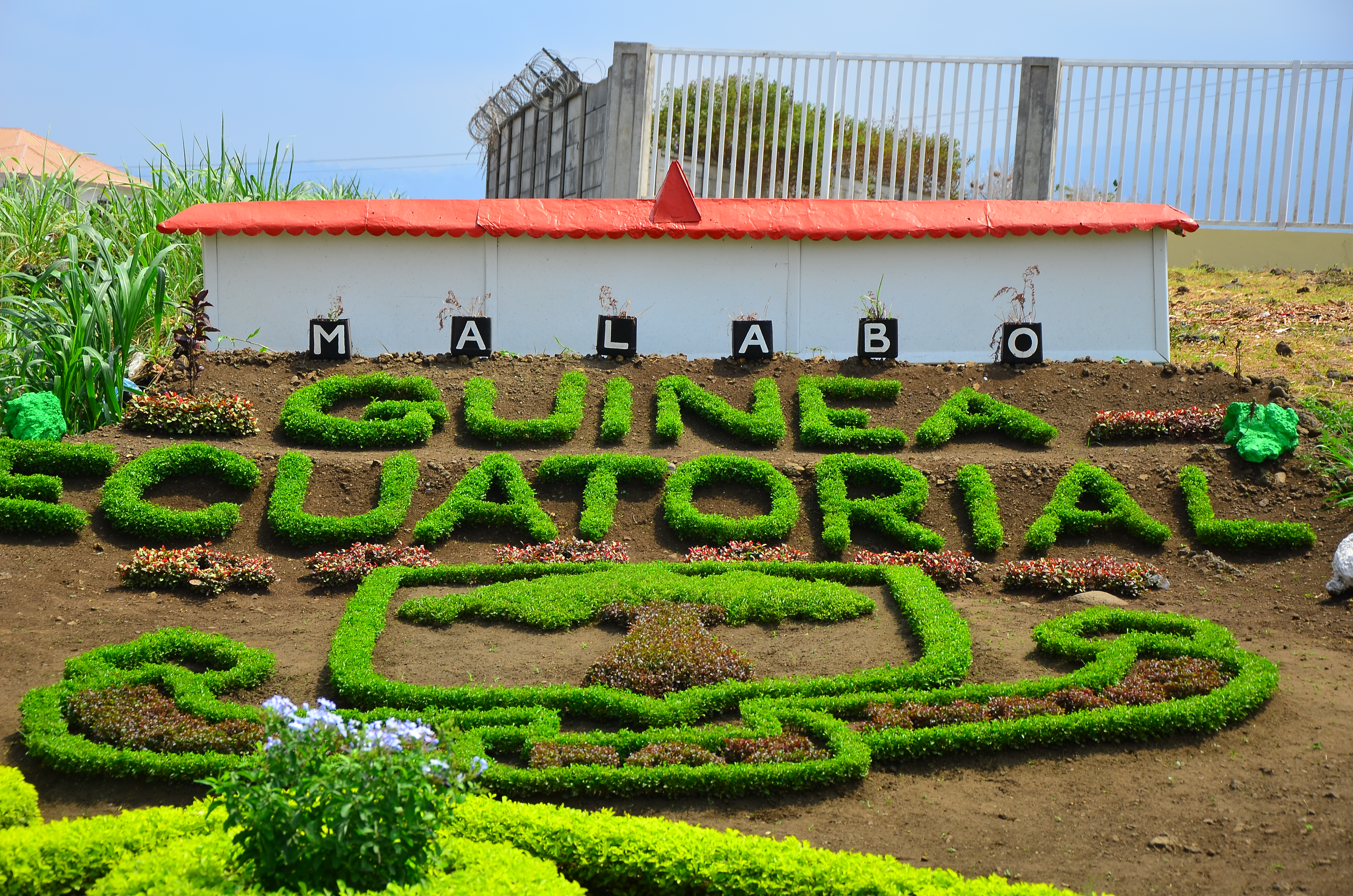
Floral inscription with the name of the country in Spanish in Malabo

Since its independence in 1968, the main official language of Equatorial Guinea has been Spanish (the local variant is Equatoguinean Spanish), which acts as a lingua franca among its different ethnic groups. In 1970, during Macías' rule, Spanish was replaced by Fang, the language of its majority ethnic group, to which Macías belonged. That decision was reverted in 1979 after Macías' fall. Spanish remained as its lone official language until 1998, when French was added as its second one, as it had previously joined the Economic and Monetary Community of Central Africa (CEMAC), whose founding members are French-speaking nations, two of them (Cameroon and Gabon) surrounding its continental region. Portuguese was adopted as its third official language in 2010. Spanish has been an official language since 1844. It is still the language of education and administration. 67.6% of Equatorial Guineans can speak it, especially those living in the former capital, Malabo. Spanish is spoken as a native language by a small minority usually in larger cities.

French was only made official in order to join the Francophonie, and it is not locally spoken, except in some border towns; and Portuguese was only made official in order to join the Community of Portuguese Language Countries, so it too is not locally spoken, although the Annobonese and local Catholics have links to the language.

Indigenous languages (some of them creoles) are recognised as integral parts of the "national culture" (Constitutional Law No. 1/1998, 21 January). They include Fang, Bube, Benga, Ndowe, Balengue, Bujeba, Bissio, Gumu, Igbo, Pichinglis, Fa d'Ambô and the nearly extinct Baseke. Most African ethnic groups speak Bantu languages.

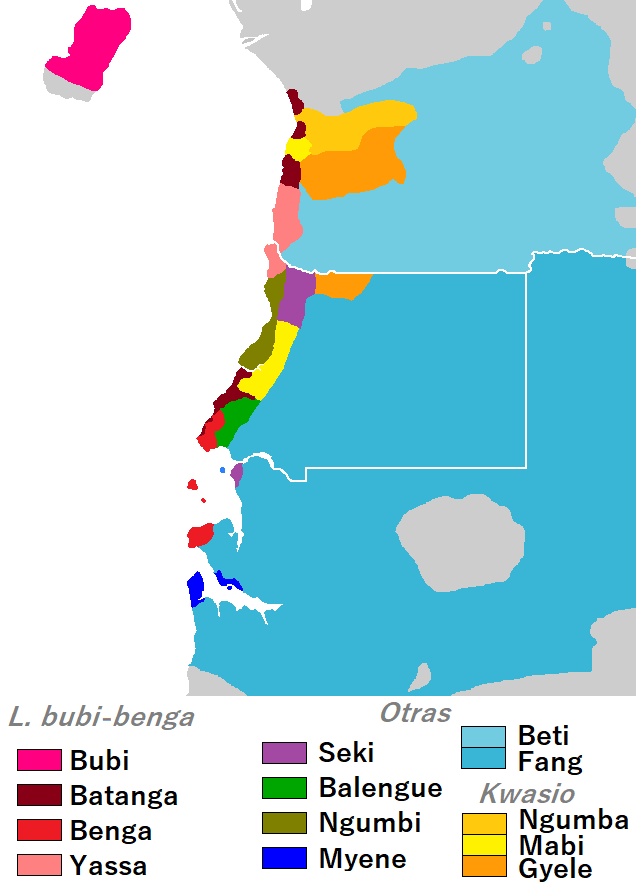
African languages of Equatorial Guinea and its environment

Fa d'Ambô, a Portuguese creole, is in use in Annobón Province, in Malabo, and on Equatorial Guinea's mainland. Many residents of Bioko can also speak Spanish, particularly in the capital, and the local trade language, Pichinglis, an English-based creole. Spanish is not spoken much in Annobón. In government and education, Spanish is used. Noncreolised Portuguese is used as a liturgical language by local Catholics. The Annobonese ethnic community tried to gain membership in the Community of Portuguese Language Countries (CPLP). The government financed an Instituto Internacional da Língua Portuguesa (IILP) sociolinguistic study in Annobón. It documented strong links with the Portuguese creole populations in São Tomé and Príncipe, Cape Verde and Guinea-Bissau.

Due to historical and cultural ties, in 2010, the legislature amended Article 4 of the Constitution of Equatorial Guinea to establish Portuguese as an official language of the Republic. This was an effort by the government to improve its communications, trade, and bilateral relations with Portuguese-speaking countries. It also recognises long historical ties with Portugal and with Portuguese-speaking peoples of Brazil, São Tomé and Príncipe, and Cape Verde.

Some of the motivations for Equatorial Guinea's pursuit of membership in the Community of Portuguese Language Countries (CPLP) included access to several professional and academic exchange programmes and facilitated cross-border circulation of citizens. The adoption of Portuguese as an official language was the primary requirement to apply for CPLP acceptance. In addition, the country was told it must adopt political reforms allowing effective democracy and respect for human rights. The national parliament discussed this law in October 2011.

In February 2012, Equatorial Guinea's foreign minister signed an agreement with the IILP on the promotion of Portuguese in the country. In July 2012, the CPLP refused Equatorial Guinea full membership, primarily because of its continued serious violations of human rights. The government responded by legalising political parties, declaring a moratorium on the death penalty, and starting a dialogue with all political factions. Additionally, the IILP secured land from the government for the construction of Portuguese language cultural centres in Bata and Malabo. At its tenth summit in Dili in July 2014, Equatorial Guinea was admitted as a CPLP member. Abolition of the death penalty and the promotion of Portuguese as an official language were preconditions of the approval.

=== Religion ===
Religion in Equatorial Guinea
Religion	per cent
Roman Catholic	88%
Other (indigenous beliefs / Baháʼí)	5%
Protestant	5%
Muslim	2%

Santa Isabel Cathedral in Malabo

The principal religion in Equatorial Guinea is Christianity, the faith of 93% of the population. Roman Catholics make up the majority (88%), while a minority are Protestants (5%). Of the population, 2% follows Islam (mainly Sunni). The remaining 5% practise Animism, Baháʼí, and other beliefs, and traditional animist beliefs are often mixed with Catholicism.

=== Health ===
Equatorial Guinea's malaria programs in the early 21st century achieved success in reducing malaria infection and mortality. Their program consists of twice-yearly indoor residual spraying (IRS), the introduction of artemisinin combination treatment (ACTs), the use of intermittent preventive treatment in pregnant women (IPTp), and the introduction of long-lasting insecticide-treated mosquito nets (LLINs). Their efforts resulted in a reduction in all-cause under-five mortality from 152 to 55 deaths per 1,000 live births (down 64%), a drop that coincided with the launch of the program.

In June 2014, four cases of polio were reported, making it the country's first outbreak of that disease.

=== Education ===
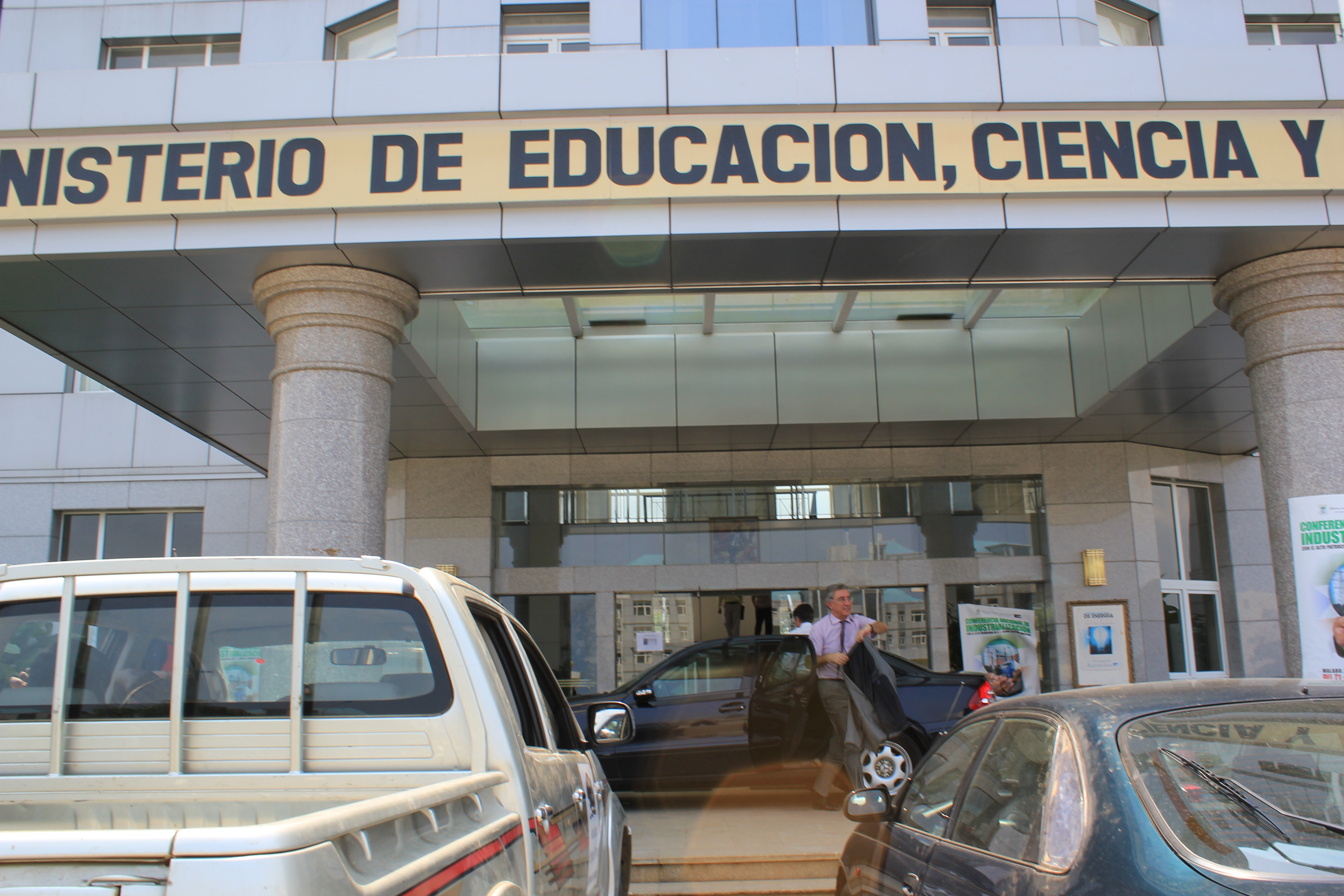
Ministry of Education, Science and Sports (Ministerio de Educación, Ciencia y Deportes in Spanish)

Among Sub-Saharan African countries, Equatorial Guinea has one of the highest literacy rates. According to the Central Intelligence Agency's World Factbook, as of 2015, 95.3% of the population age 15 and over were able to read and write in the country. Under Francisco Macias, few children received any type of education. Under President Obiang, the illiteracy rate dropped from 73% to 13%, and the number of primary school students rose from 65,000 in 1986 to more than 100,000 in 1994. Education is free and compulsory for children between the ages of 6 and 14.

The Equatorial Guinea government has partnered with Hess Corporation and The Academy for Educational Development (AED) to establish a $20 million education program for primary school teachers to teach modern child development techniques. There are now 51 model schools whose active pedagogy will be a national reform.

The country has one university, the Universidad Nacional de Guinea Ecuatorial (UNGE), with a campus in Malabo and a Faculty of Medicine located in Bata on the mainland. In 2009 the university produced the first 110 national doctors. The Bata Medical School is supported principally by the government of Cuba and staffed by Cuban medical educators and physicians.

== Culture ==
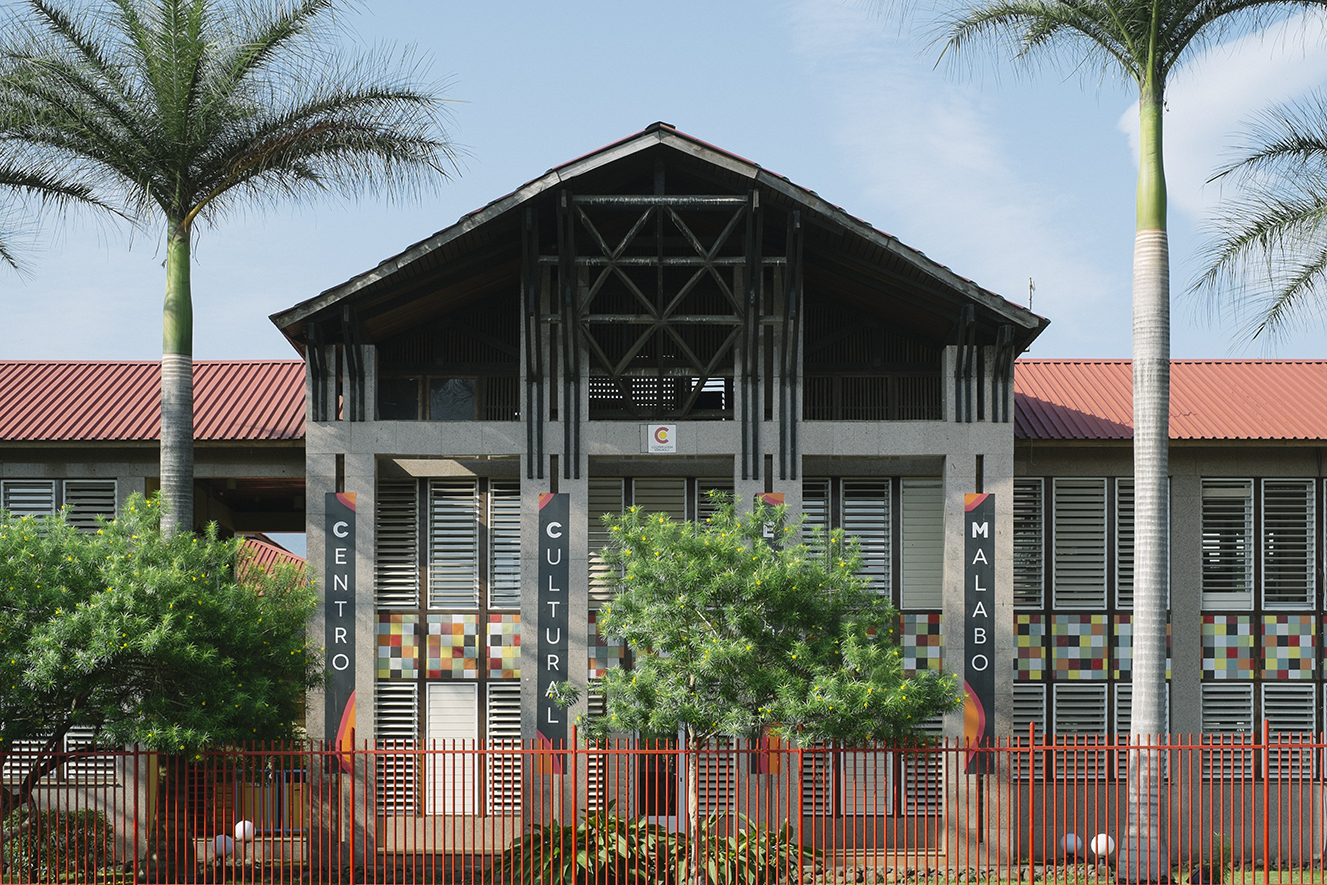
Centro Cultural de España (Cultural Centre of Spain) in Malabo

In June 1984, the First Hispanic-African Cultural Congress was convened to explore the cultural identity of Equatorial Guinea.

=== Tourism ===
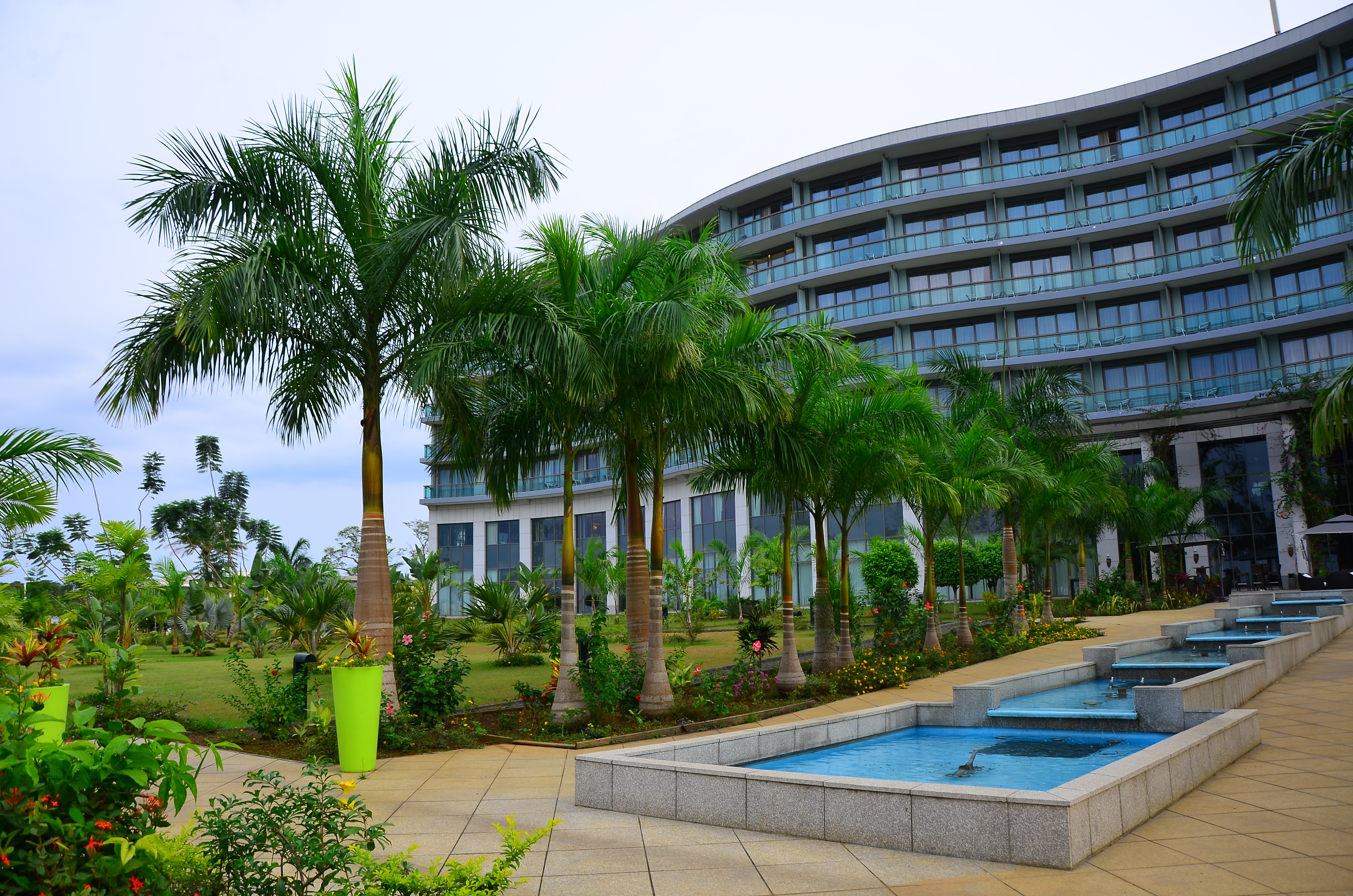
Hotel in Sipopo

As of 2026, Equatorial Guinea has no UNESCO World Heritage Site or tentative sites for the World Heritage List. The country also has no documented heritage listed in the Memory of the World Programme of UNESCO nor any intangible cultural heritage listed in the UNESCO Intangible Cultural Heritage List.

Tourist attractions are the colonial quarter in Malabo, the southern part of Bioko where hikers can visit the Iladyi cascades and remote beaches with nesting turtles, Bata with its shoreline Paseo Maritimo and the tower of liberty, Mongomo with its basilica (the second largest Catholic church in Africa) and the planned capital Ciudad de la Paz.

=== Media and communications ===
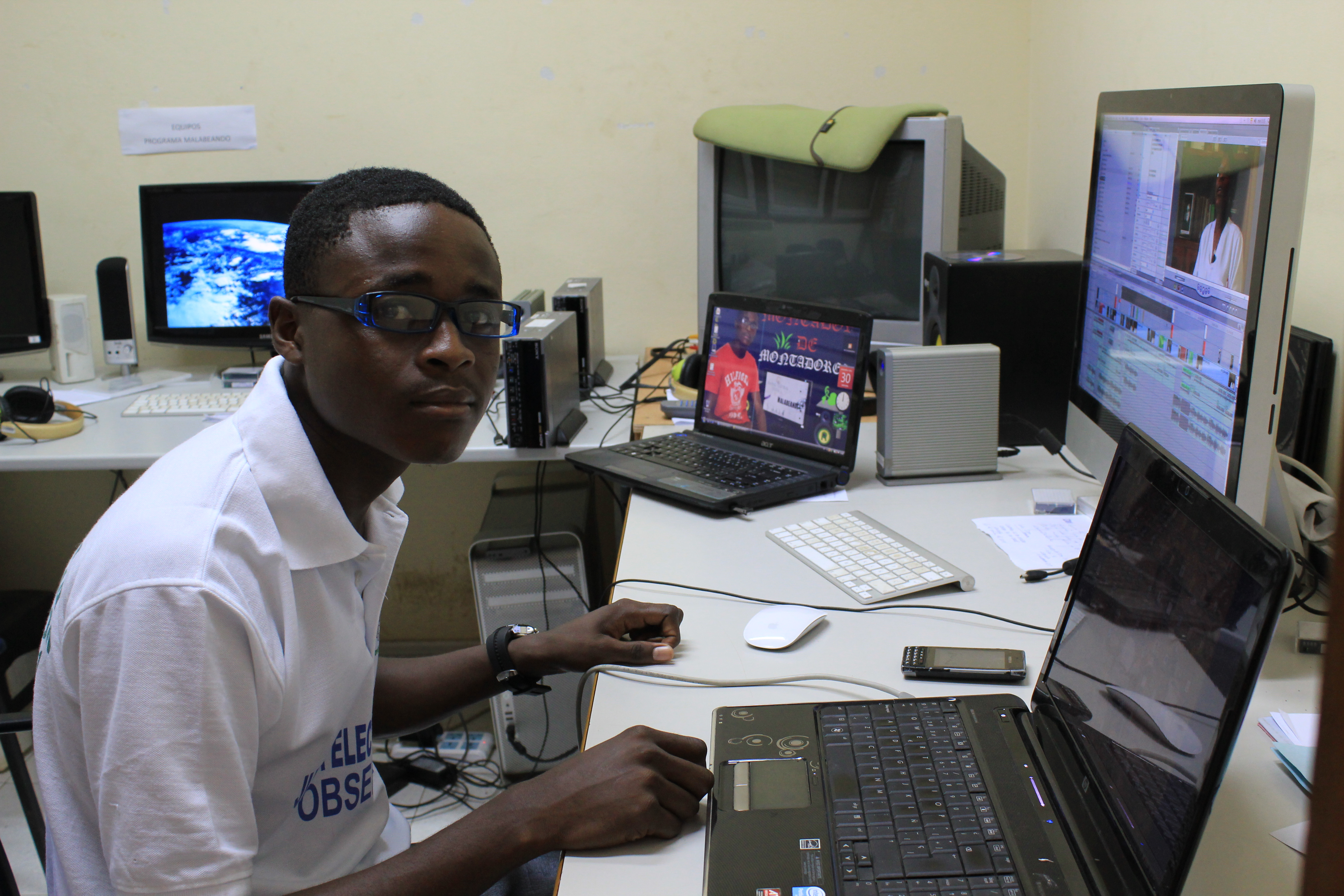
Edition of the television magazine Malabeando at the Cultural Centre of Spain in Malabo

The principal means of communication within Equatorial Guinea are three state-operated FM radio stations: the BBC World Service, Radio France Internationale and Gabon-based Africa No 1 broadcast on FM in Malabo. There is also an independent radio option called Radio Macuto; it is a web-based radio and news source known for publishing news that calls out Obiang's regime. There are also five shortwave radio stations. Televisión de Guinea Ecuatorial, the television network, is state-operated. The international TV programme RTVGE is available via satellites in Africa, Europe, and the Americas and worldwide via the Internet. There are two newspapers and two magazines.

Equatorial Guinea ranked 161st out of 179 countries in the 2012 Reporters Without Borders press freedom index. The watchdog says the national broadcaster obeys the orders of the information ministry. Most of the media companies practice self-censorship, and are banned by law from criticising public figures. The state-owned media and the main private radio station are under the directorship of the president's son, Teodor Obiang.

Landline telephone penetration is low, with only two lines available per 100 people. There is one GSM mobile telephone operator, with coverage of Malabo, Bata, and several mainland cities. As of 2009, approximately 40% of the population subscribed to mobile telephone services. The only telephone provider in Equatorial Guinea is Orange. According to the World Bank, there were more than a million Internet users by 2022.

=== Music ===
Pan-African styles like soukous and makossa are popular, as are reggaeton, Latin trap, reggae and rock and roll.

=== Cinema ===
In 2014, the South African-Dutch-Equatorial Guinean drama film Where the Road Runs Out was shot in the country. There is also the documentary The Writer from a Country Without Bookstores. It is openly critical of Obiang's regime.

=== Sports ===
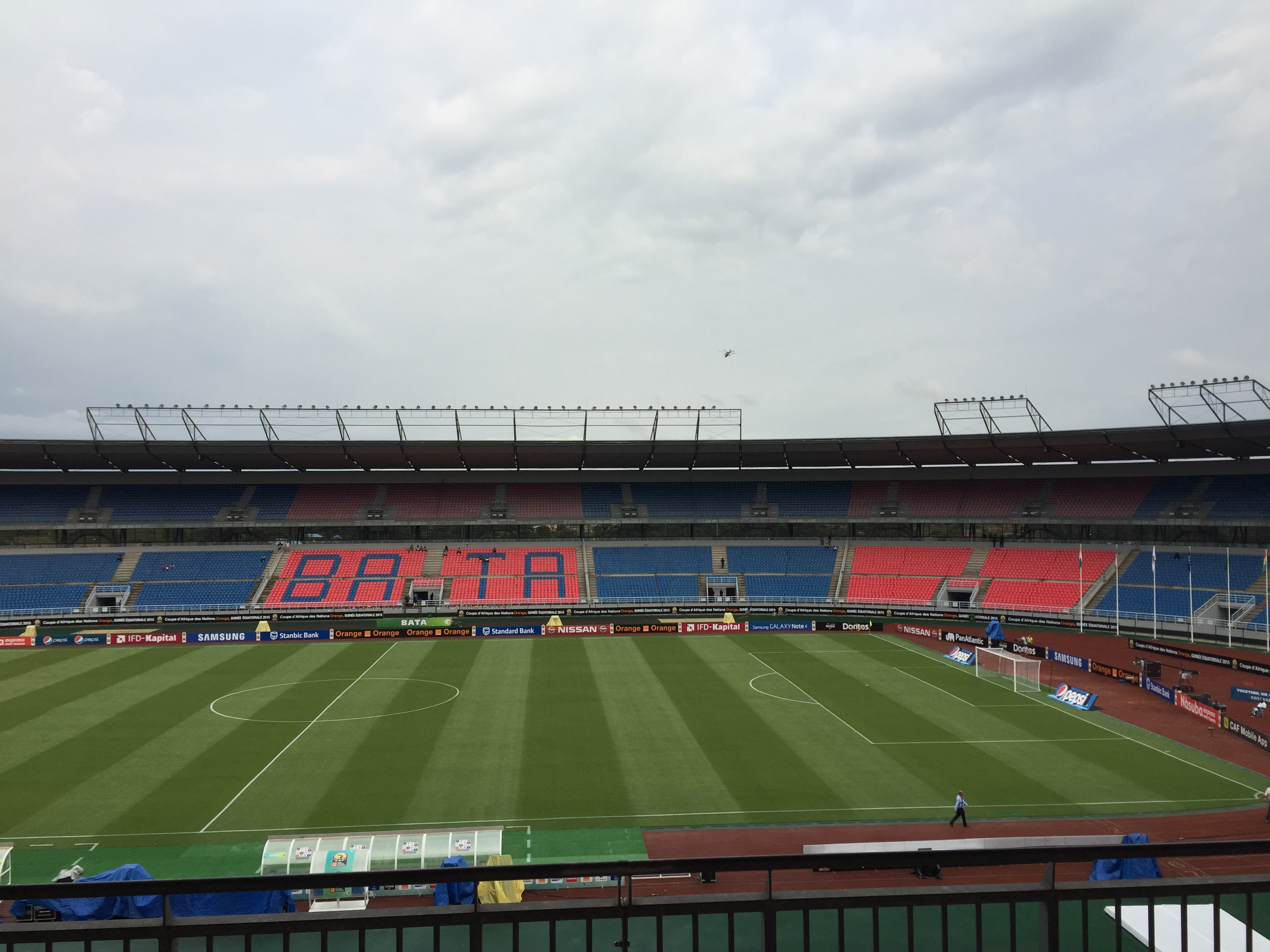
Bata Stadium

Equatorial Guinea was chosen to co-host the 2012 African Cup of Nations in partnership with Gabon, and hosted the 2015 edition. The country was also chosen to host the 2008 Women's African Football Championship, which they won. The women's national team qualified for the 2011 World Cup in Germany. In June 2016, Equatorial Guinea was chosen to host the 12th African Games in 2019.

Equatorial Guinea is famous for the swimmers Eric Moussambani, nicknamed "Eric the Eel", and Paula Barila Bolopa, "Paula the Crawler", who attended the 2000 Summer Olympics.

Basketball has been increasing in popularity.

== See also ==
- Outline of Equatorial Guinea
- Agriculture in Equatorial Guinea

== Sources ==
- D. L. Claret. Cien años de evangelización en Guinea Ecuatorial (1883–1983) / One Hundred Years of Evangelism in Equatorial Guinea (1983, Barcelona: Claretian Missionaries).
- Robert Klitgaard. 1990. Tropical Gangsters. New York: Basic Books. ISBN 0-465-08760-4. A World Bank economist tries to assist pre-oil Equatorial Guinea.
- Max Liniger-Goumaz, Small Is Not Always Beautiful: The Story of Equatorial Guinea (French 1986, translated 1989) ISBN 0-389-20861-2.
- Adam Roberts, The Wonga Coup: Guns, Thugs and a Ruthless Determination to Create Mayhem in an Oil-Rich Corner of Africa (2006, PublicAffairs) ISBN 1-58648-371-4.

Attribution This article incorporates public domain material from The World Factbook (2025 ed.). CIA.
