= Outline of Equatorial Guinea =

Country in Central Africa

The Flag of Equatorial Guinea

The Coat of arms of Equatorial Guinea

The location of Equatorial Guinea

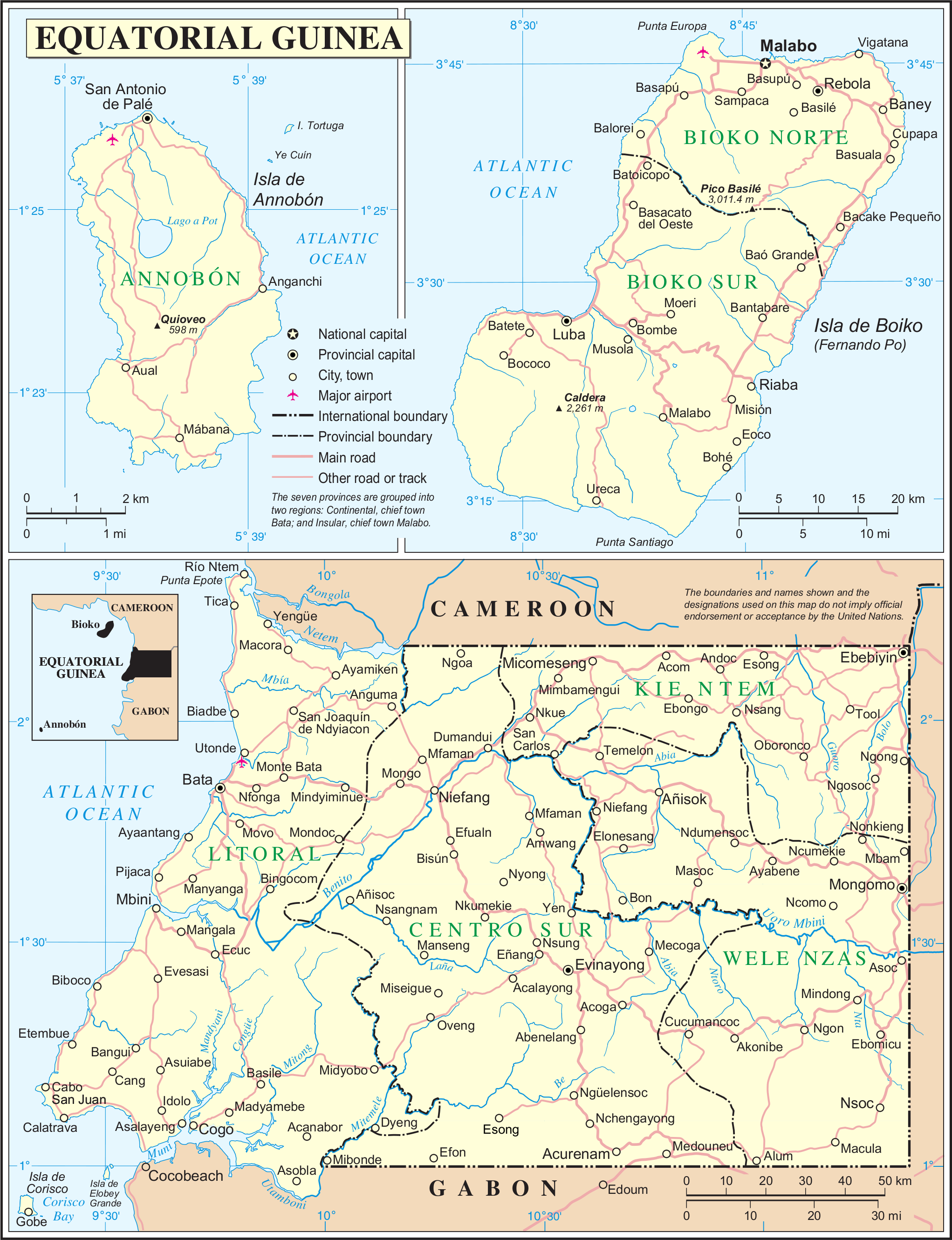
An enlargeable map of the Republic of Equatorial Guinea

The following outline is provided as an overview of and topical guide to Equatorial Guinea:

Equatorial Guinea – sovereign country located on the Gulf of Guinea in Middle Africa. It is one of the smallest countries in continental Africa, and comprises two regions: Río Muni, continental region that includes the capital Ciudad de la Paz and several offshore islands; and Insular Region containing Annobón island in the South Atlantic Ocean, and Bioko island (formerly Fernando Po) that contains the former capital, Malabo.

== General Reference ==
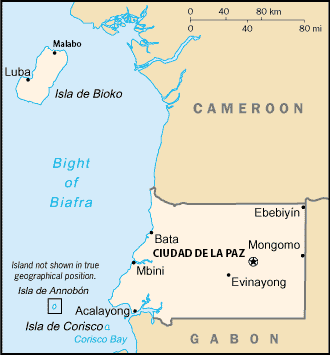

- Pronunciation: /ˌɛkwəˈtɔːriəl ˈɡɪni, ˌiːkwə-/
- Common English country name: Equatorial Guinea
- Official English country name: The Republic of Equatorial Guinea
- Common endonym(s): Guinea Ecuatorial
- Official endonym(s): República de Guinea Ecuatorial
- Adjectives: Equatorial Guinean, Equatoguinean
- Demonym(s): Equatorial Guineans, Equatoguineans
- International rankings of Equatorial Guinea
- ISO country codes: GQ, GNQ, 226
- ISO region codes: See ISO 3166-2:GQ
- Internet country code top-level domain: .gq

== Geography ==
Geography of Equatorial Guinea

- Equatorial Guinea is: a country
- Location:
  - Northern Hemisphere and Eastern Hemisphere
  - Africa
    - Central Africa
  - Time zone: West Africa Time (UTC+01)
  - Extreme points of Equatorial Guinea
    - High: Pico Basile 3,008 m (9,869 ft)
    - Low: North Atlantic Ocean 0 m
  - Land boundaries: 539 km

Gabon 350 km
Cameroon 189 km

- Coastline: Gulf of Guinea 296 km

- Population of Equatorial Guinea: 507,000 - 164th most populous country
- Area of Equatorial Guinea: 28,051 km^{2}
- Atlas of Equatorial Guinea

=== Environment ===
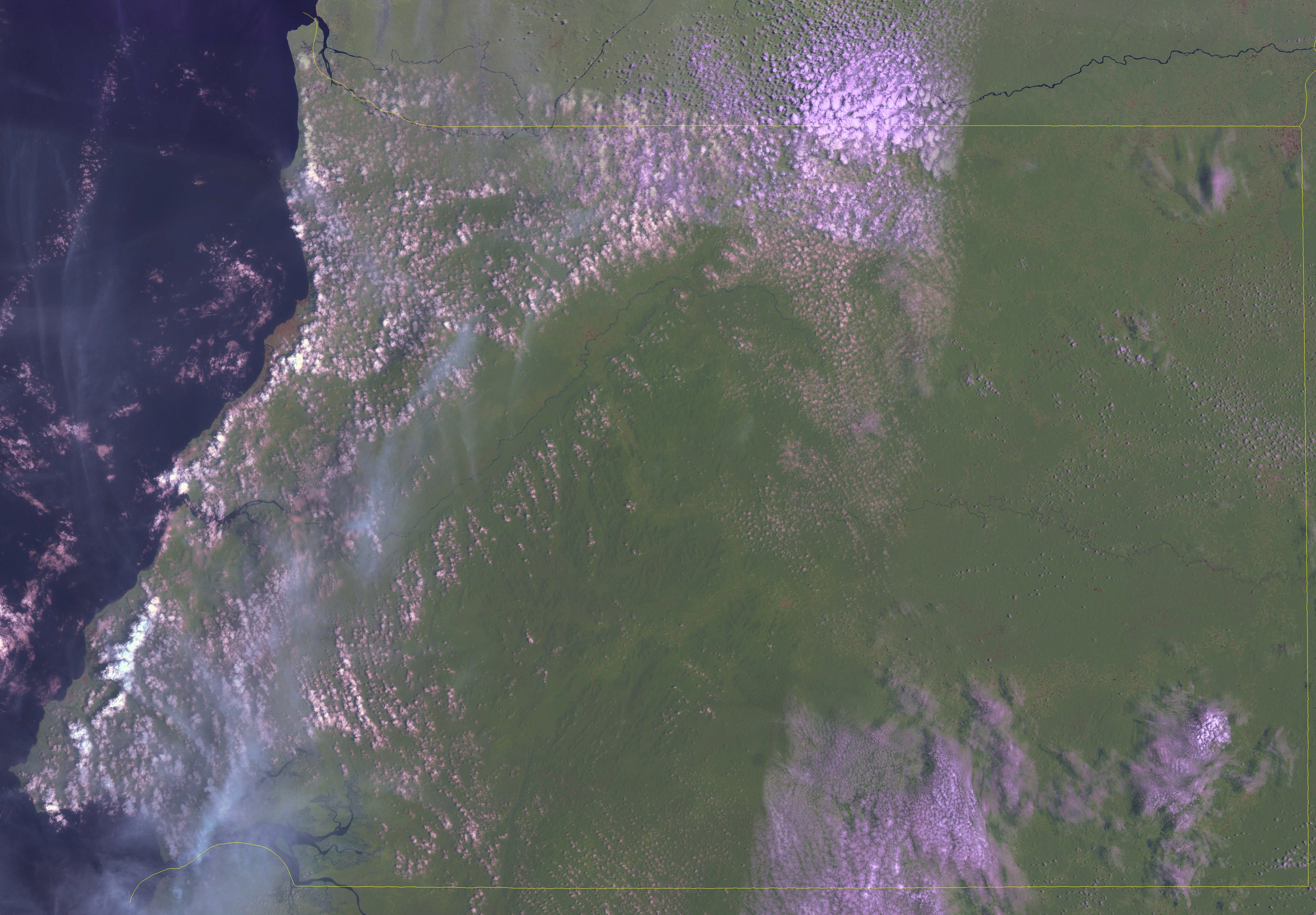
An enlargeable satellite image of continental Equatorial Guinea

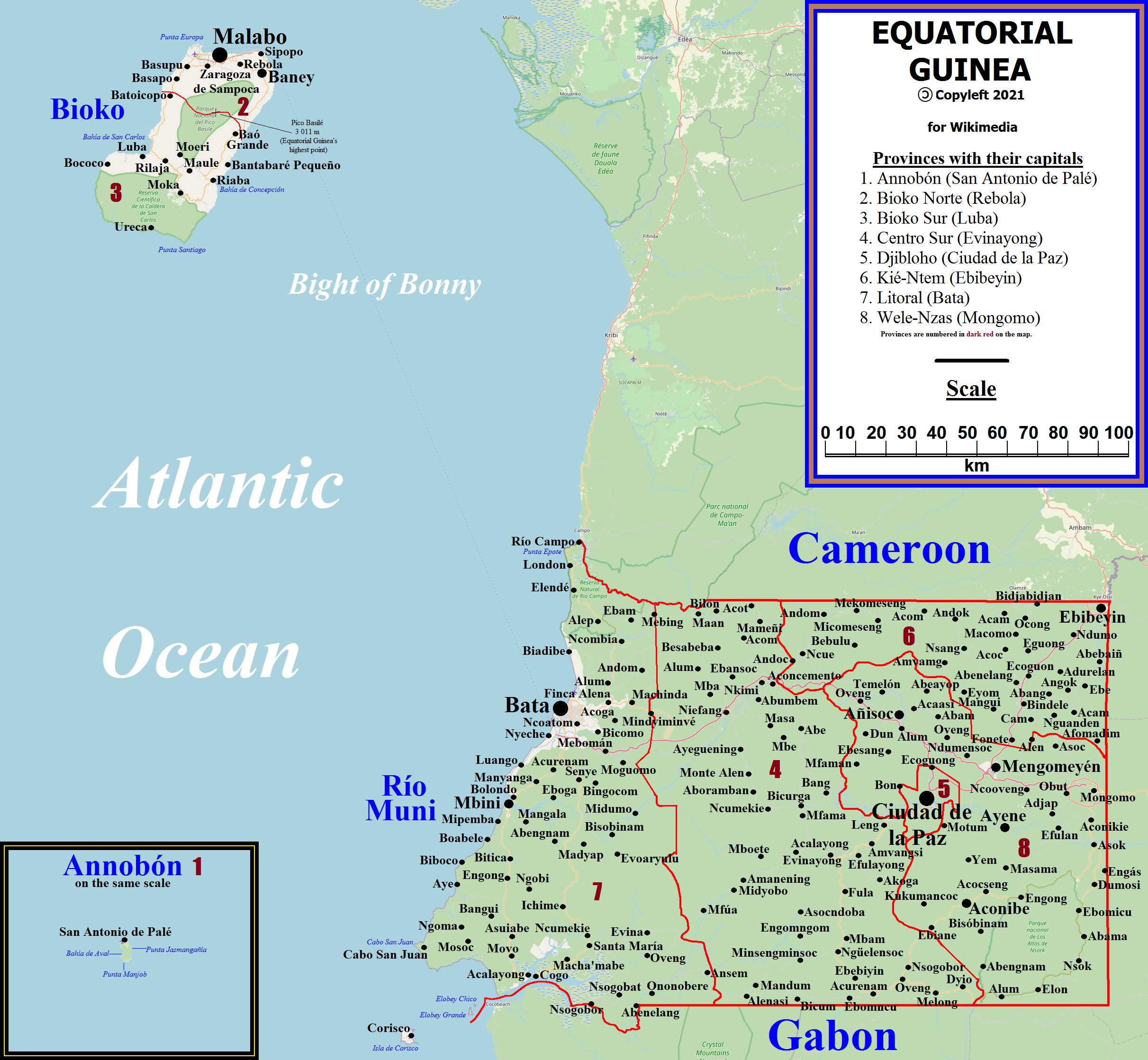
A map showing Equatorial Guinea's cities, towns and selected villages, along with some geographical features.

- Climate of Equatorial Guinea
- Ecoregions in Equatorial Guinea
- Geology of Equatorial Guinea
- Wildlife of Equatorial Guinea
  - Fauna of Equatorial Guinea
    - Birds of Equatorial Guinea
    - Mammals of Equatorial Guinea

==== Natural geographic features ====
- Glaciers in Equatorial Guinea: none
- Islands of Equatorial Guinea
- Mountains of Equatorial Guinea
  - Volcanoes in Equatorial Guinea
- Rivers of Equatorial Guinea
- World Heritage Sites in Equatorial Guinea: None

=== Regions ===
Regions of Equatorial Guinea

==== Ecoregions ====
List of ecoregions in Equatorial Guinea

==== Administrative divisions ====
Administrative divisions of Equatorial Guinea

- Provinces of Equatorial Guinea

===== Provinces =====
Provinces of Equatorial Guinea

===== Municipalities =====
- Capital of Equatorial Guinea: Ciudad de la Paz
- Cities of Equatorial Guinea

=== Demography ===
Demographics of Equatorial Guinea

== Government and politics ==
Politics of Equatorial Guinea

- Form of government: presidential republic
- Capital of Equatorial Guinea: Ciudad de la Paz
- Elections in Equatorial Guinea
- Political parties in Equatorial Guinea

=== Branches of the government ===
Government of Equatorial Guinea

==== Executive branch ====
- Head of state: President of Equatorial Guinea, Teodoro Obiang Nguema Mbasogo
- Head of government: Prime Minister of Equatorial Guinea, Manuel Osa Nsue Nsua

==== Legislative branch ====
- Parliament of Equatorial Guinea (bicameral)
  - Upper house: Senate of Equatorial Guinea
  - Lower house: House of Commons of Equatorial Guinea

==== Judicial branch ====
Court system of Equatorial Guinea

=== Foreign relations ===
Foreign relations of Equatorial Guinea

- Diplomatic missions in Equatorial Guinea
- Diplomatic missions of Equatorial Guinea

==== International organization membership ====
The Republic of Equatorial Guinea is a member of:

- African, Caribbean, and Pacific Group of States (ACP)
- African Development Bank Group (AfDB)
- African Union (AU)
- Community of Portuguese Language Countries (CPLP) (associate)
- Conference des Ministres des Finances des Pays de la Zone Franc (FZ)
- Development Bank of Central African States (BDEAC)
- Economic and Monetary Community of Central Africa (CEMAC)
- Food and Agriculture Organization (FAO)
- Group of 77 (G77)
- International Bank for Reconstruction and Development (IBRD)
- International Civil Aviation Organization (ICAO)
- International Criminal Police Organization (Interpol)
- International Development Association (IDA)
- International Federation of Red Cross and Red Crescent Societies (IFRCS)
- International Finance Corporation (IFC)
- International Fund for Agricultural Development (IFAD)
- International Labour Organization (ILO)
- International Maritime Organization (IMO)
- International Monetary Fund (IMF)
- International Olympic Committee (IOC)
- International Red Cross and Red Crescent Movement (ICRM)
- International Telecommunication Union (ITU)
- International Telecommunications Satellite Organization (ITSO)
- Multilateral Investment Guarantee Agency (MIGA)
- Nonaligned Movement (NAM)
- Organisation internationale de la Francophonie (OIF)
- Organisation for the Prohibition of Chemical Weapons (OPCW)
- Organization of American States (OAS) (observer)
- United Nations (UN)
- United Nations Conference on Trade and Development (UNCTAD)
- United Nations Educational, Scientific, and Cultural Organization (UNESCO)
- United Nations Industrial Development Organization (UNIDO)
- Universal Postal Union (UPU)
- World Federation of Trade Unions (WFTU)
- World Health Organization (WHO)
- World Intellectual Property Organization (WIPO)
- World Tourism Organization (UNWTO)
- World Trade Organization (WTO) (observer)

=== Law and order ===
Law of Equatorial Guinea

- Constitution of Equatorial Guinea
- Human rights in Equatorial Guinea
  - LGBT rights in Equatorial Guinea
- Law Enforcement in Equatorial Guinea
  - Equatorial Guinean National Police
  - National Gendermeries

=== Military ===
Military of Equatorial Guinea

- Command
  - Commander-in-chief:
- Forces
  - Army of Equatorial Guinea
  - Navy of Equatorial Guinea
  - Air Force of Equatorial Guinea

=== Local government ===
Local government in Equatorial Guinea

== History ==
History of Equatorial Guinea

- Current events of Equatorial Guinea

=== History by subject ===
- History of rail transport in Equatorial Guinea
- Postage stamps and postal history of Equatorial Guinea

== Culture ==
Culture of Equatorial Guinea

- Cuisine of Equatorial Guinea
- Languages of Equatorial Guinea
- Media in Equatorial Guinea
- National symbols of Equatorial Guinea
  - Coat of arms of Equatorial Guinea
  - Flag of Equatorial Guinea
  - National anthem of Equatorial Guinea
- People of Equatorial Guinea
- Public holidays in Equatorial Guinea
- Religion in Equatorial Guinea
  - Christianity in Equatorial Guinea
  - Hinduism in Equatorial Guinea
  - Islam in Equatorial Guinea
  - Sikhism in Equatorial Guinea
- World Heritage Sites in Equatorial Guinea: None

=== Art ===
- Music of Equatorial Guinea

=== Sports ===
Sport in Equatorial Guinea

- Football in Equatorial Guinea
- Equatorial Guinea at the Olympics

== Economy and infrastructure ==
Economy of Equatorial Guinea

- Economic rank, by nominal GDP (2007): 115th (one hundred and fifteenth)
- Agriculture in Equatorial Guinea
- Communications in Equatorial Guinea
  - Internet in Equatorial Guinea
- Companies of Equatorial Guinea
- Currency of Equatorial Guinea: Franc
  - ISO 4217: XAF
- Energy in Equatorial Guinea
- Health care in Equatorial Guinea
- Mining in Equatorial Guinea
- Tourism in Equatorial Guinea
- Transport in Equatorial Guinea
  - Airports in Equatorial Guinea
  - Rail transport in Equatorial Guinea

== Education ==
Education in Equatorial Guinea

== Health in Equatorial Guinea ==
Health in Equatorial Guinea

== See also ==
Equatorial Guinea

- List of Equatorial Guinea-related topics
- List of international rankings
- Member state of the United Nations
- Outline of Africa
- Outline of geography
