= Radio Nacional =

Radio Nacional (Spanish) or Rádio Nacional (Portuguese), both meaning National Radio, may refer to:

- Rádio Nacional de Angola
- LRA Radio Nacional, Argentina
- Rádio Nacional, Brazil
- Radio Nacional de España (RNE), Spain
- Radio Nacional de Guinea Equatorial, Equatorial Guinea
- Radio Nacional de la R.A.S.D., Sahrawi Republic
- Radio Nacional del Paraguay
- Radio Nacional del Perú
- Radio Nacional del Uruguay
- Radio Nacional de Venezuela
- Radio Nacional (Chile)
