= TVGE =

Equatorial Guinean state television channel

Televisión de Guinea Ecuatorial
- Country: Equatorial Guinea
- Broadcast area: Nationwide
- Network: Radio Televisión de Guinea Ecuatorial (RTVGE)
- Headquarters: Malabo

Programming
- Languages: Spanish, French, Portuguese
- Picture format: 4:3 576i

Ownership
- Owner: Equatorial Guinean state

History
- Launched: 20 July 1968; 58 years ago

Links
- Website: tvgelive.gq

Televisión de Guinea Ecuatorial (TVGE, translated into English as Television of Equatorial Guinea) is an Equatorial Guinean state television channel, which is part of the public media system called Radio Televisión de Guinea Ecuatorial (RTVGE).

A Spanish-speaking channel, is basically sponsored by the local government depending on the Ministry of Information, Press and Radio, so their programs are usually pro-government.

It has its headquarters and main offices in the capital city of Malabo, from where it broadcasts to most of the national territory.

== History ==
The channel was inaugurated on 20 July 1968 as the territorial center of Televisión Española (TVE), and in its inaugural broadcast the Spanish leader Francisco Franco gave a speech to the people of Equatorial Guinea. The Spanish minister of Information and Tourism, Manuel Fraga, participated in the inauguration.

After the independence of Equatorial Guinea on 12 October 1968, the channel (which was still being operated by TVE) came into conflict with the new authorities, who accused it of broadcasting "racist programming". As the situation worsened (in the context of the Diplomatic Crisis between Spain and Equatorial Guinea in 1969), the new Equatorial Guinean government demanded that Spain donate all the facilities that the territorial center of TVE had in Equatorial Guinea or a donation of its economic value (of 2 million pesetas), but Spain refused. Faced with this refusal, the new president, Francisco Macías Nguema, banned the broadcast of part of the programming sent from Madrid, mainly the recreational and cultural programs, since for the government it was "imperialist propaganda". On the other hand, the territorial news that TVE issued for the country became heavily censored by the new Equatorial Guinean Ministry of the Interior.

TVE eventually closed its territorial center that gave television coverage to the country. Shortly thereafter, its broadcasts were resumed as Televisión Nacional de Guinea Ecuatorial, but it ceased to function in 1973 due to the government's lack of interest in creating the optimal conditions for the good performance of the station, ignoring the requirements of the few Spanish technicians who still operated it under Equatorial Guinean supervision and eventually left the country. During the Macías dictatorship, TVGE usually broadcast footage of the regime's tours of the country and popular meetings. After the withdrawal of the Spanish technicians, Macías wanted to put the television back on track with the help of Cuban technicians, but it was impossible to repair the damaged material.

TVGE was reestablished in 1979, after the coup d'état known as Golpe de la Libertad. TVE technicians also participated in the re-establishment, as part of the cooperation policy initiated by Spain with Equatorial Guinea after the coup. During this period, it broadcast from a transmitter in Malabo on VHF channel 2.

In 2009, the channel received criticism from the Equatorial Guinean government for faults presented in its transmissions, for which cooperation agreements have been signed to train personnel with Spain and China, as well as investments for a new headquarters and purchase of equipment with the intention of improving the quality of its programming. In addition, it has also received criticism from the opposition for alleged bias with the government.

Since 31 May 2011, its international transmission reaches all of Europe, some countries in North Africa, the Middle East, Central Asia and part of Greenland (Overseas territory of Denmark) through the W3A satellite of Eutelsat. Their emissions were regularized two weeks later. It also broadcasts to the Americas through the Telstar 12 satellite. In 2016, its transmission for all of America began formally through the satellite Hispasat 1E.

== See also ==
- Radio Nacional de Guinea Ecuatorial
- Media of Equatorial Guinea
