= TV Perú =

Peruvian state-owned television network

- Country: Peru
- Broadcast area: Worldwide

Programming
- Picture format: 1080i HDTV (downscaled to 480i for the SDTV feed)

Ownership
- Owner: National Institute of Radio and Television of Peru (Instituto Nacional de Radio y Televisión del Perú)
- Key people: Marco Aurelio Denegri

History
- Launched: January 17, 1958; 68 years ago
- Founder: a UNESCO joint venture
- Former names: Canal 7 (1958-1980); Radio Televisión Peruana (1980-1986; 1989-1990); TV-Perú (1986-1989); Televisión Nacional del Peru (1997-2006)

Links
- Website: www.tvperu.gob.pe

Availability

Terrestrial
- Analog VHF: Channel 7 (Lima, listings may vary)
- Digital VHF: Channel 7.1 (Lima, listings may vary)

TV Perú is the flagship public television network of Peruvian state broadcaster IRTP. It is Peru's first channel and the one to have the widest coverage area in the country.

In 2010, it started broadcasting on digital terrestrial television and became the first TV network in the country to do so. Its headquarters are located in the Santa Beatriz neighbourhood in Lima district, Lima.

== History ==
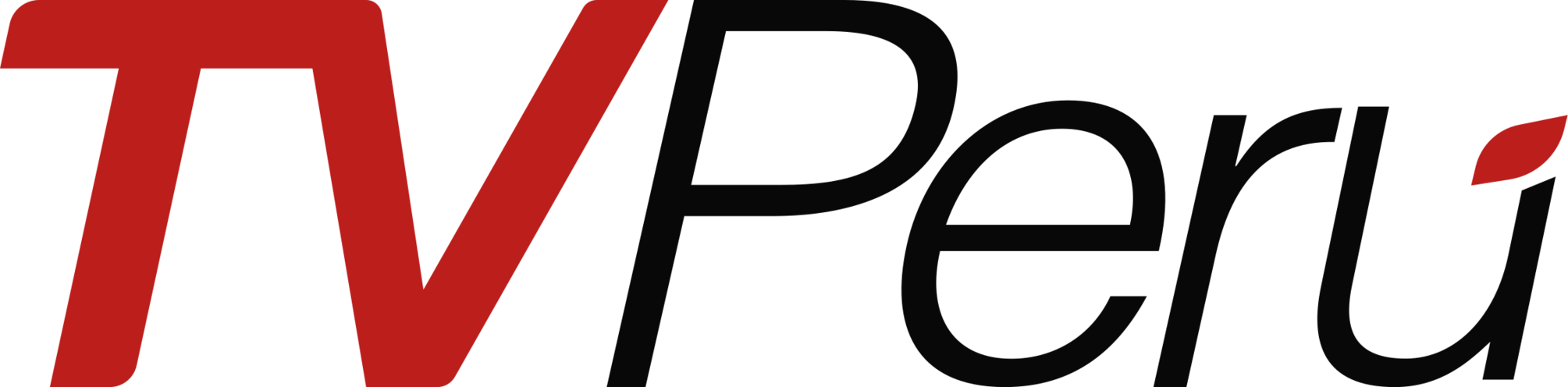
TV Peru logo (2009–2012)

On 12 January 1957, the Communications General Regulation was issued by the government, which consisted of updated sections around television broadcasting, reserving VHF channels 5 and 7 to the Peruvian state. Dedicated headquarters for the new channel were inaugurated on the 22nd floor of the Education Ministry building (at the time, the tallest in Lima), with a small antenna on the building's rooftop and a medium 150 watt transmitter. In April of that same year, the Industrial Promotion Law was declared to be applicable to television, allowing it the tax exempt import of broadcasting equipment, as most shops in Lima were already selling TV sets of different brands. By mid-1957, viewers could receive the channel as a test broadcast. On 17 January 1958, Lima's channel 7 was founded as a joint venture by UNESCO and the Peruvian government identifying itself as OAD-TV. Its first broadcast was the airing of a technical documentary about television and installation of antennas. It broadcast three times per week and was operated by the Electronic School of the Public Education Ministry. Its first programmes were Quince minutos de canciones, Informativo del canal, Melodías de antaño, Album criollo, among others.

Between 1959 and 1962, its broadcasts were interrupted due to a reorganisation in the network's management. In 1961, due to internal conflicts, the channel 7 management was divided in two groups: the Channel 7 Television Station (Estación de Televisión Canal 7) and the Electronic School Inca Garcilaso OAD TV Channel 7 (Escuela de Electrónica Inca Garcilaso OAD TV Canal 7). As these issues were later resolved, the network resumes normal broadcasts in 14 June, with broadcasts from 5:00 p.m. to 9:00 p.m. By that time, it already had regular programming that aired for three hours from Monday to Saturday, solely focused on cultural themes.

Color television began via test airings in 1974 and it was adopted as official using the United States NTSC standard beginning as in 1977.

In the 1980s the station started satellite color TV transmissions across Peru. In 1985, under Alan García's government, the TV station was given the popular TV Perú (but the legal name remained RTP). In 1996, RTP renamed to its current corporate name Television Nacional del Perú during Alberto Fujimori's regime. In 2006 the station was renamed again to TV Perú.

Nowadays TV Perú is better known for its regular programming devoted to spread Peruvian culture, by showing documentaries such as Reportaje al Perú and Costumbres. Sometime during the mid-2000s (decade) aired reruns of korean dramas dubbed into Spanish such as All About Eve, A wish upon star among others.

On 30 March 2010, TV Perú launched its high-definition signal on digital terrestrial television (using ISDB-TB) with the collaboration of the government of Japan who provided the proper equipment.

TV Perú's headquarters are in Lima, Peru.

== TV Perú Internacional ==
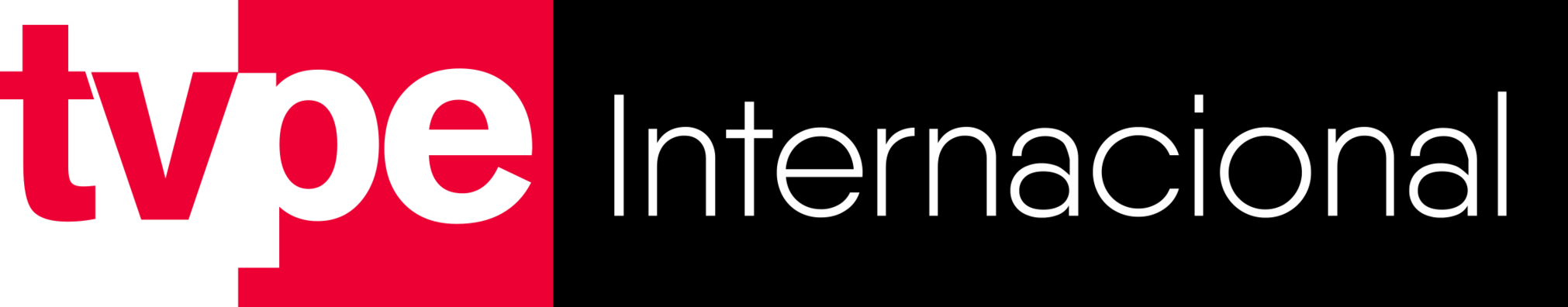
Current logo of the television channel

TV Perú Internacional is a Peruvian satellite free-to-air and pay television channel, owned by Government of Peru and operated by National Institute of Radio and Television of Peru. Is the signal international of the state channel TV Perú, with headquarters in Lima. The channel is available in Latin America including Peru, Europe, North America, Asia, Oceania and the North Africa.

== Logos ==
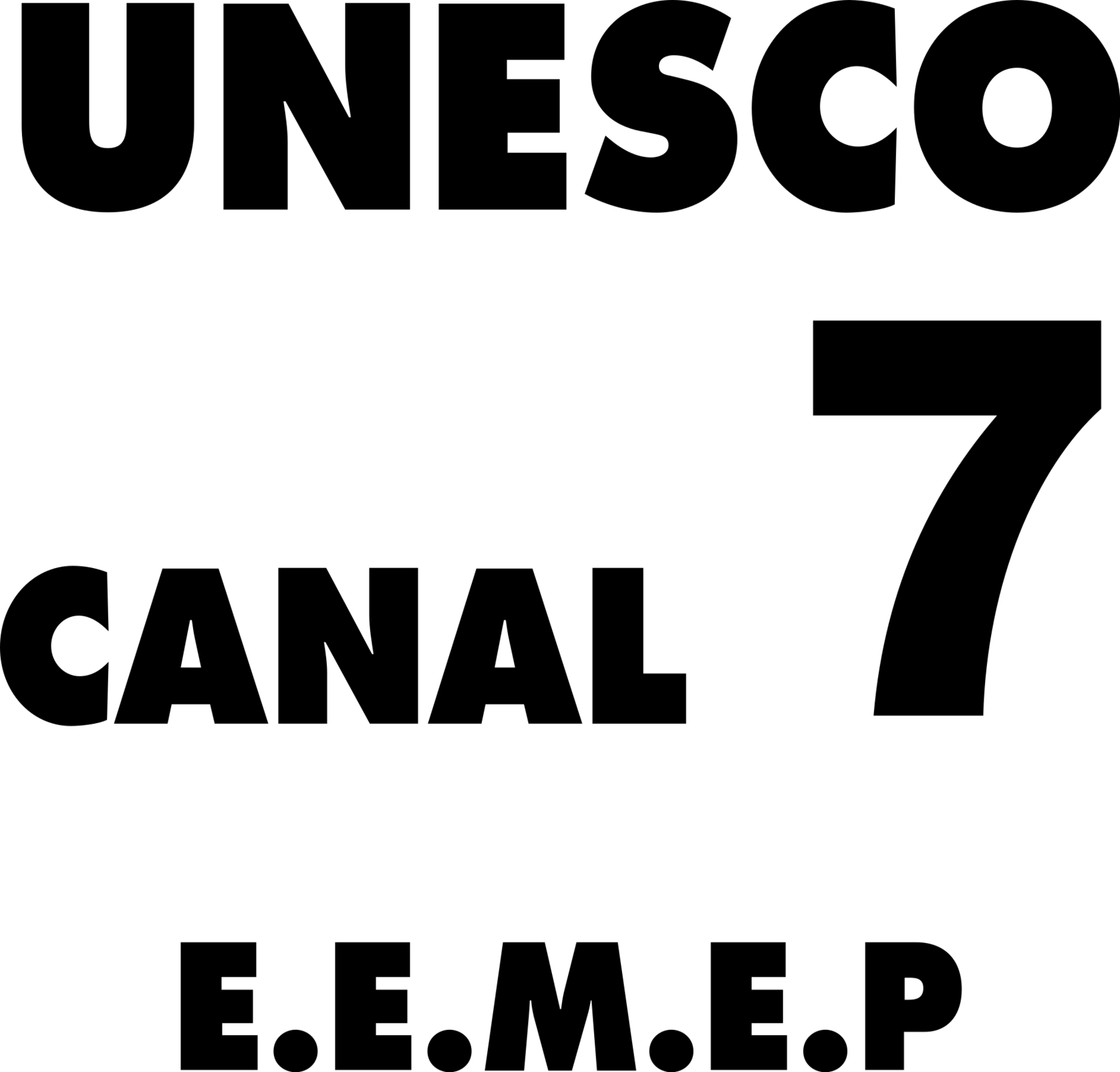
1958-1969

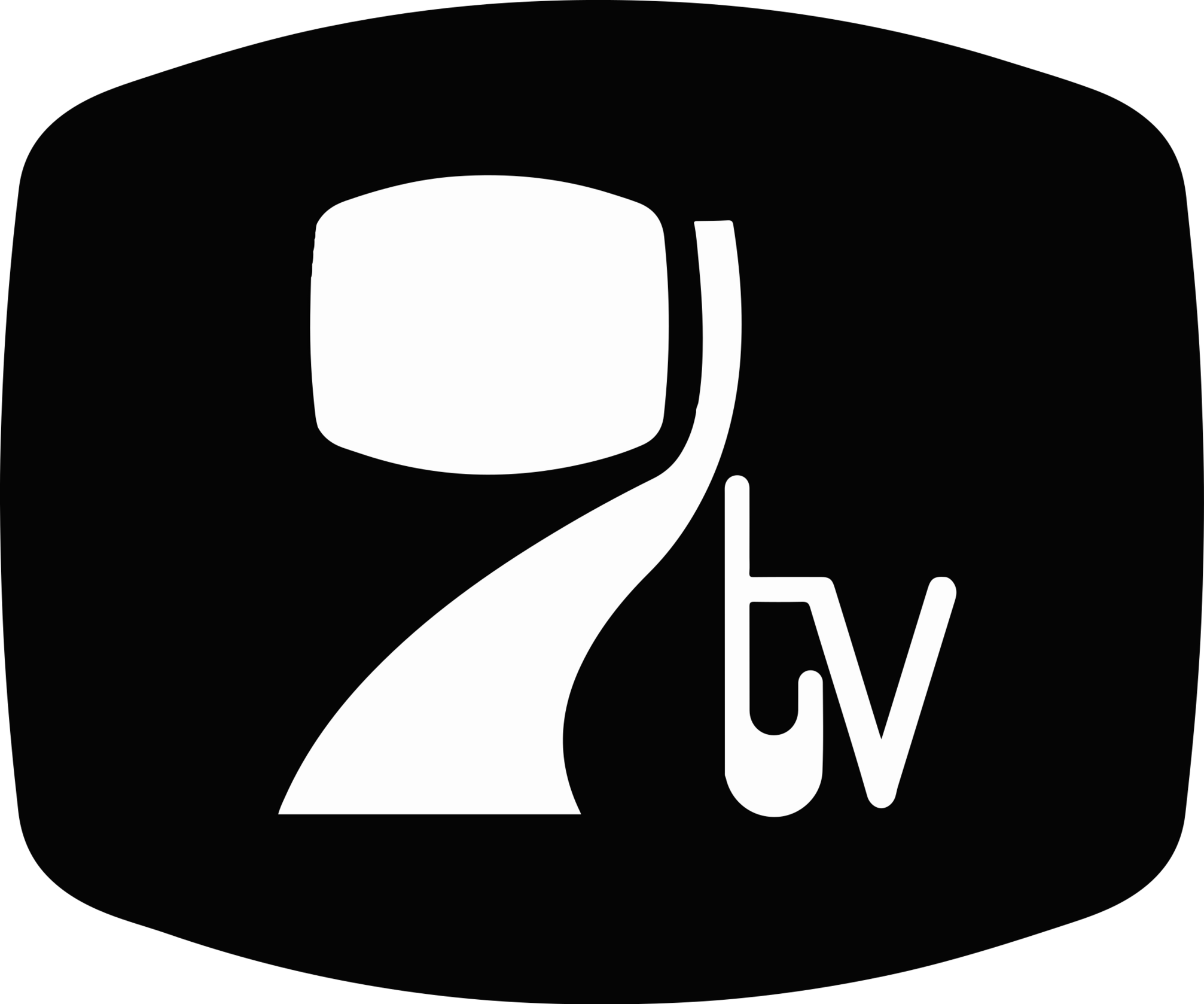
1969-1971

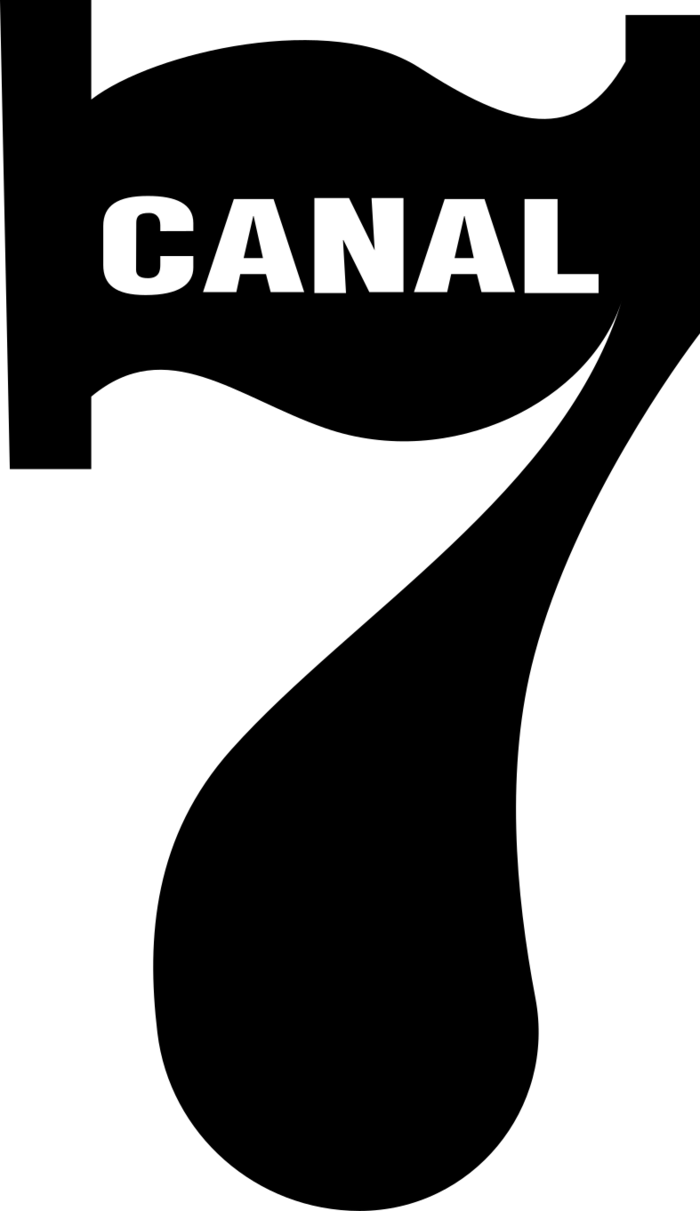
1971-1974

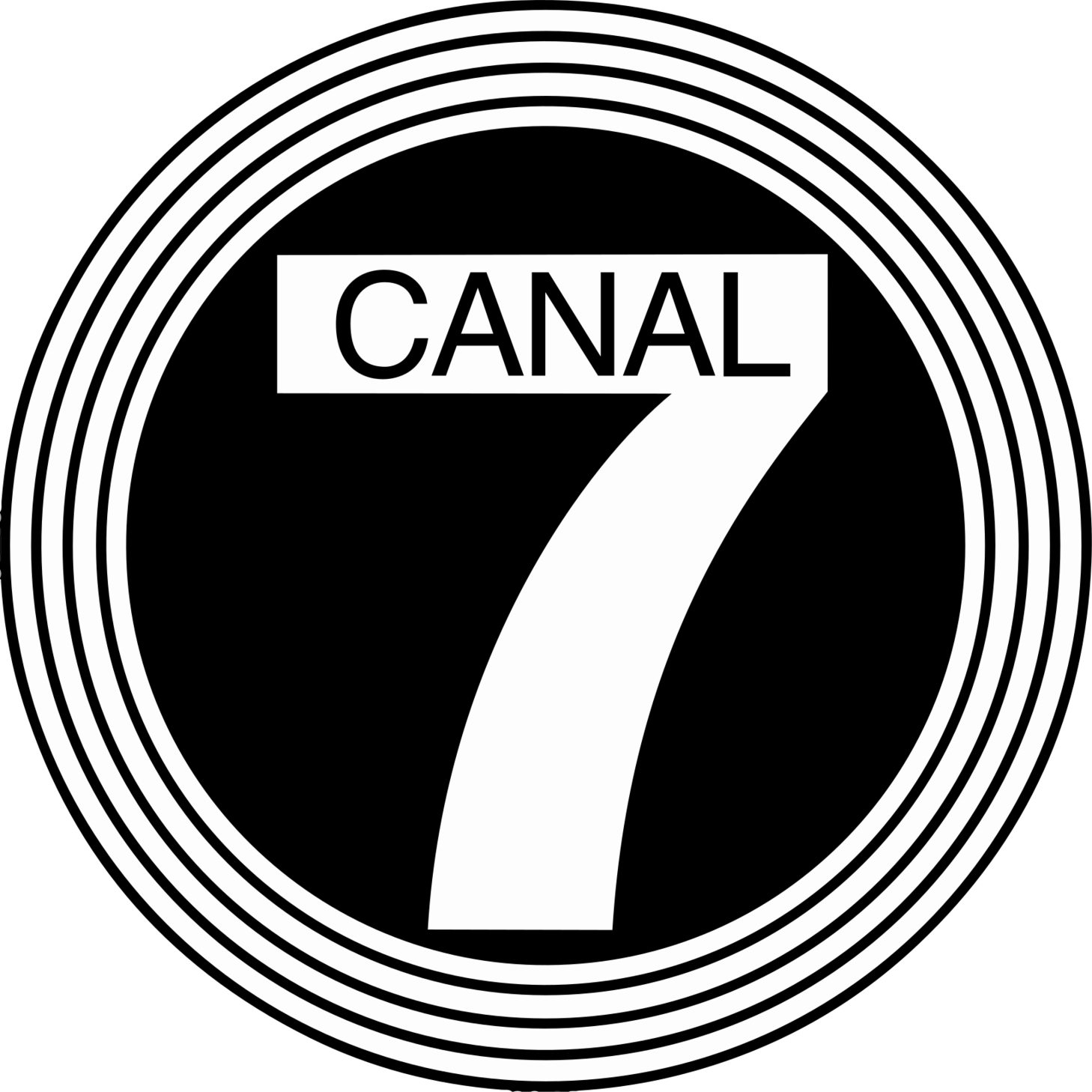
1974-1978

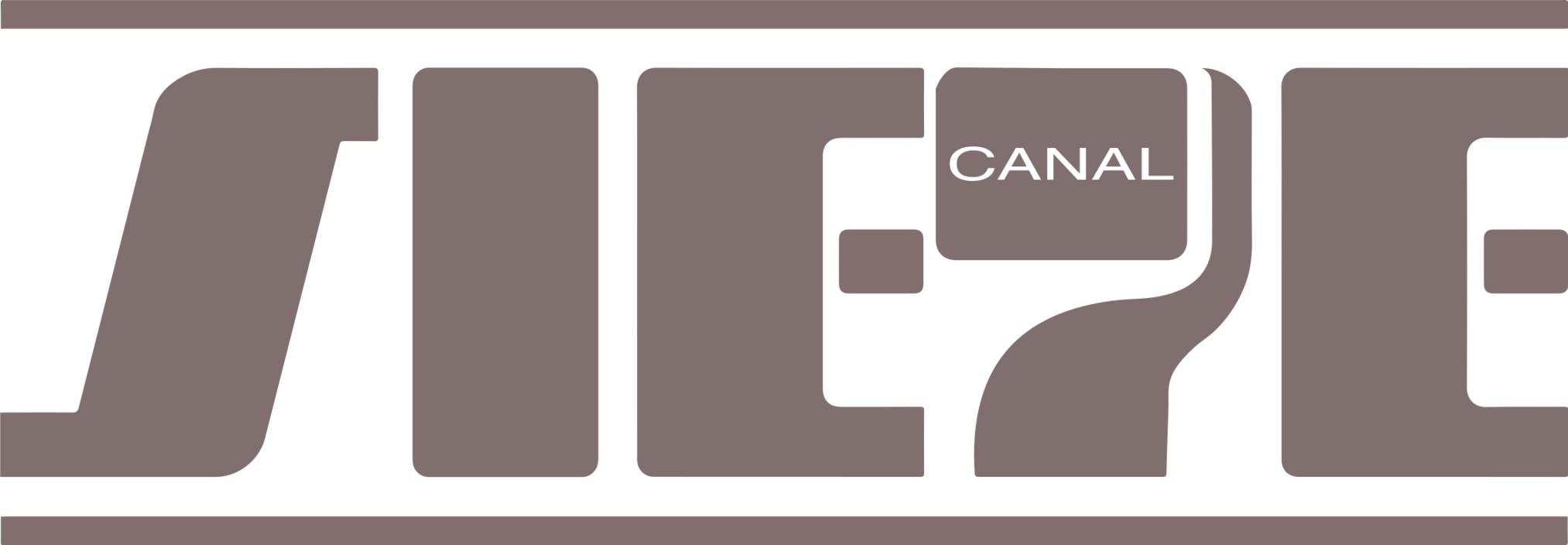
1979

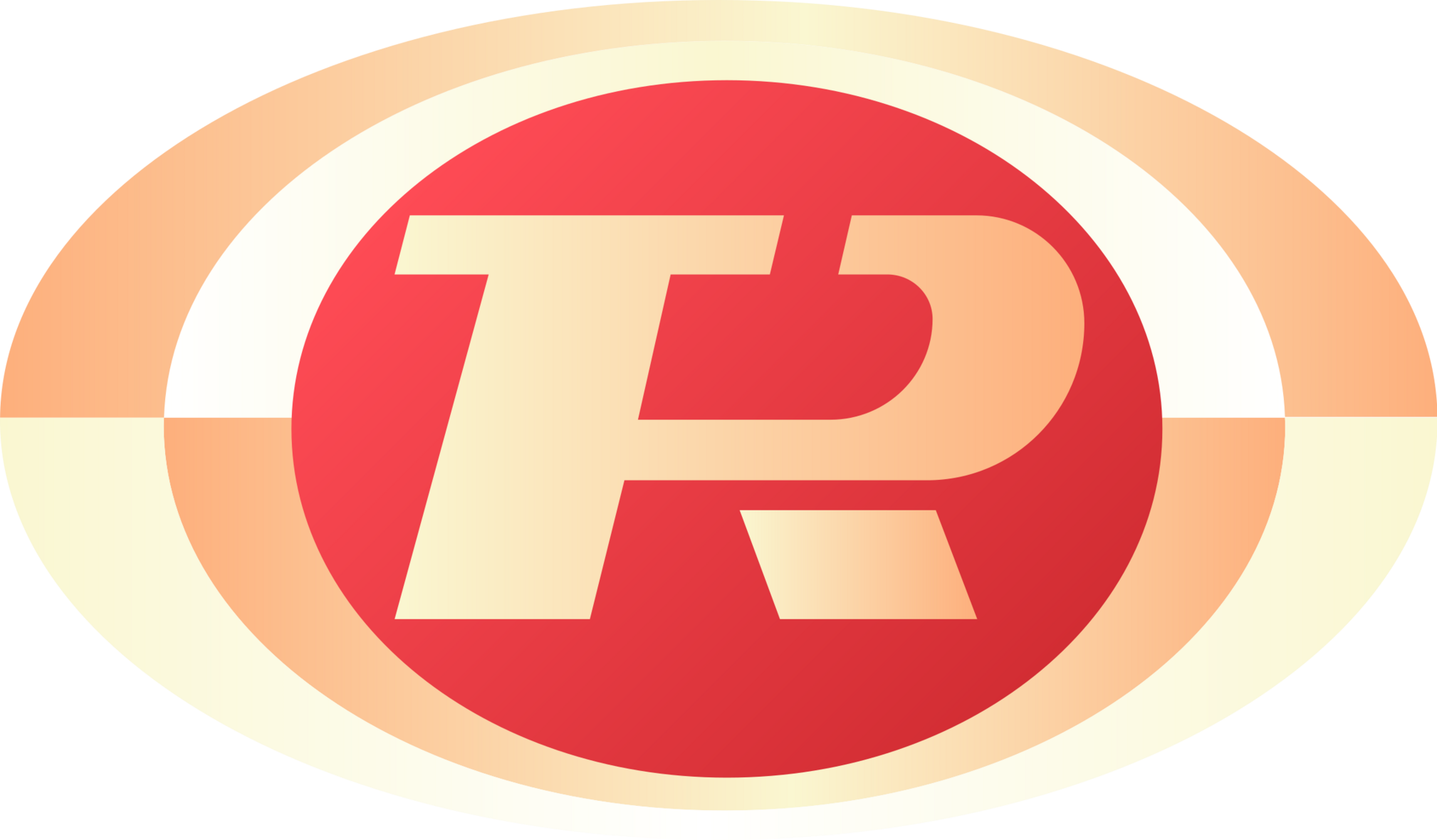
1981-1982

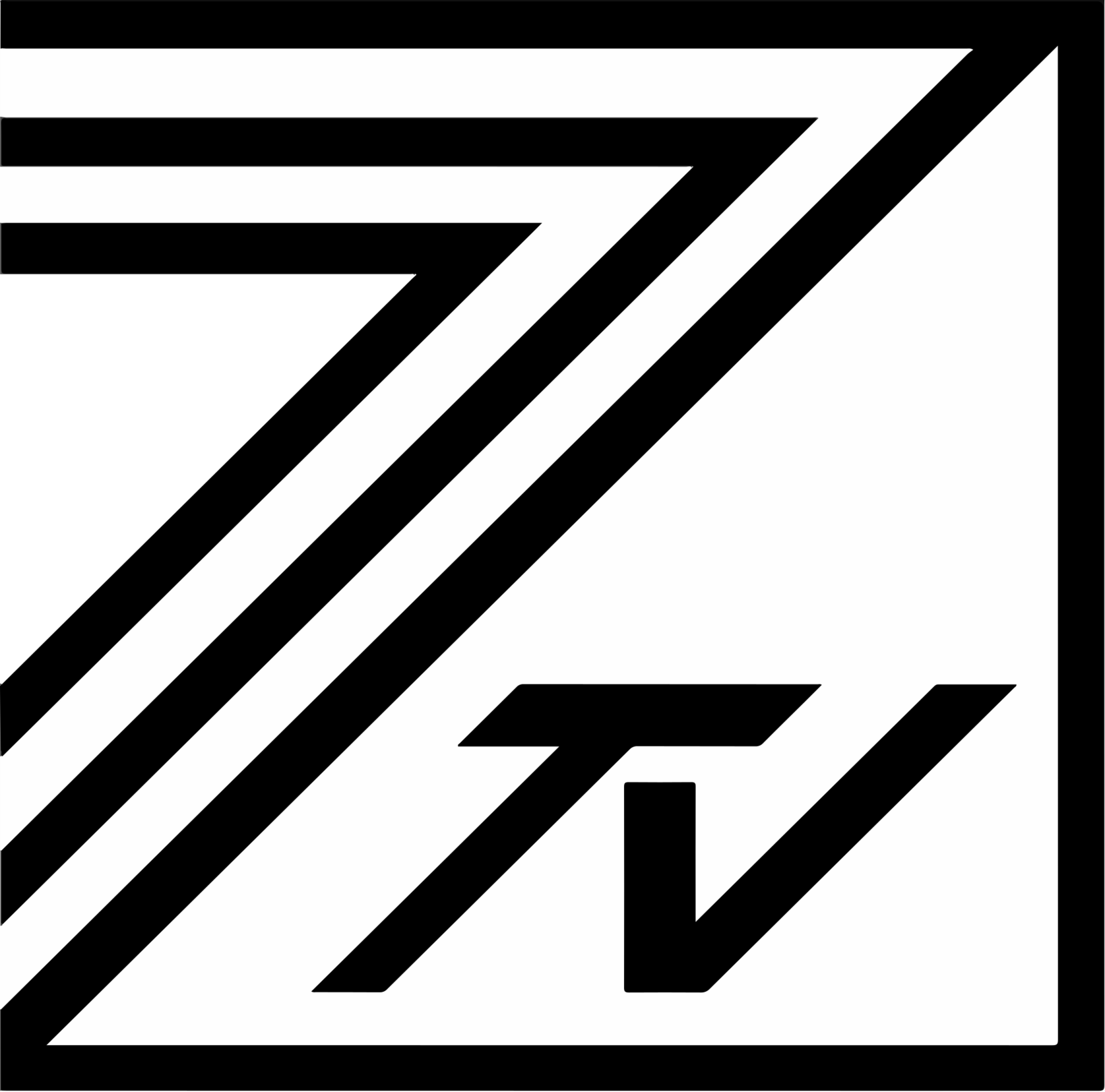
1986-1988

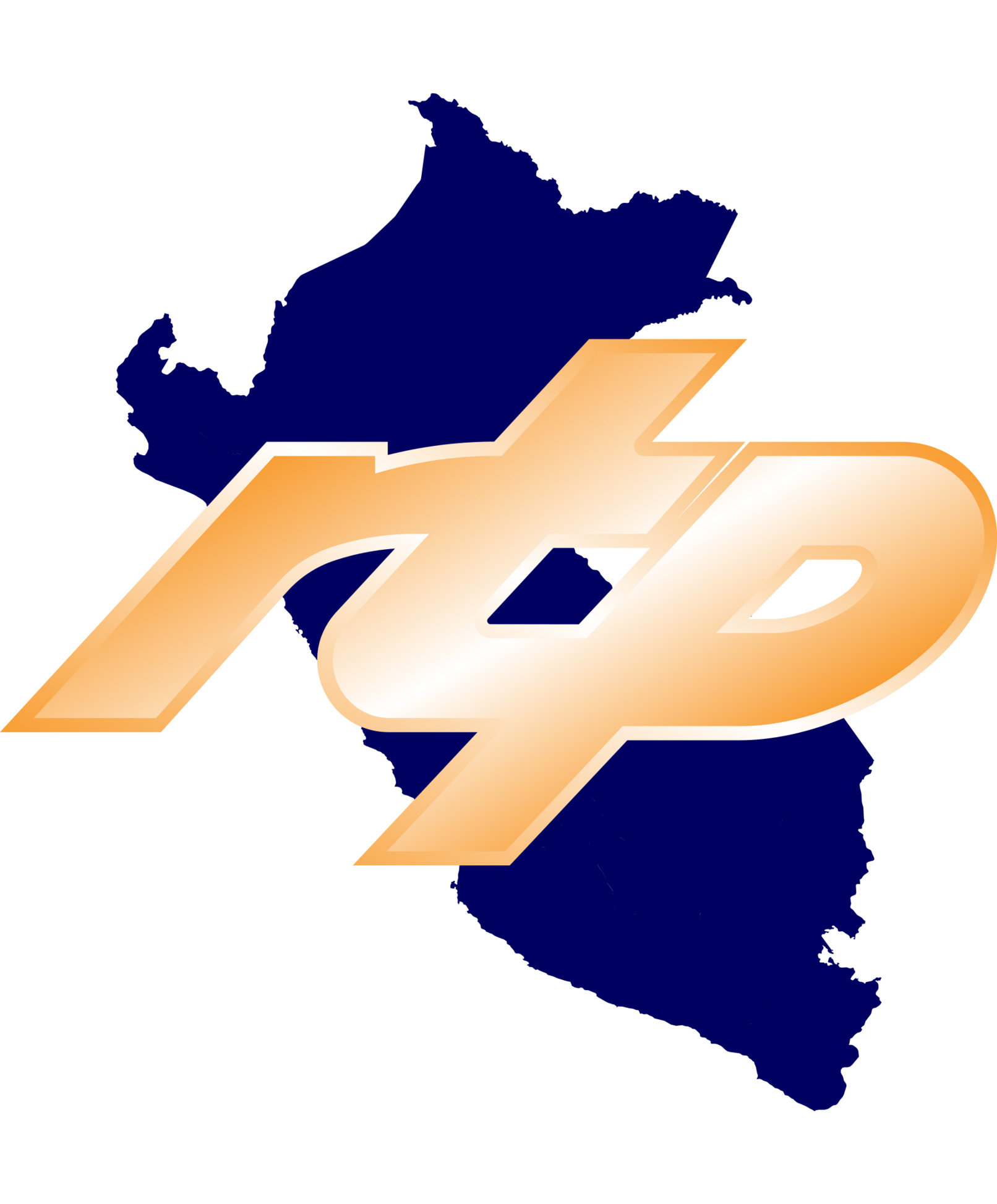
1989

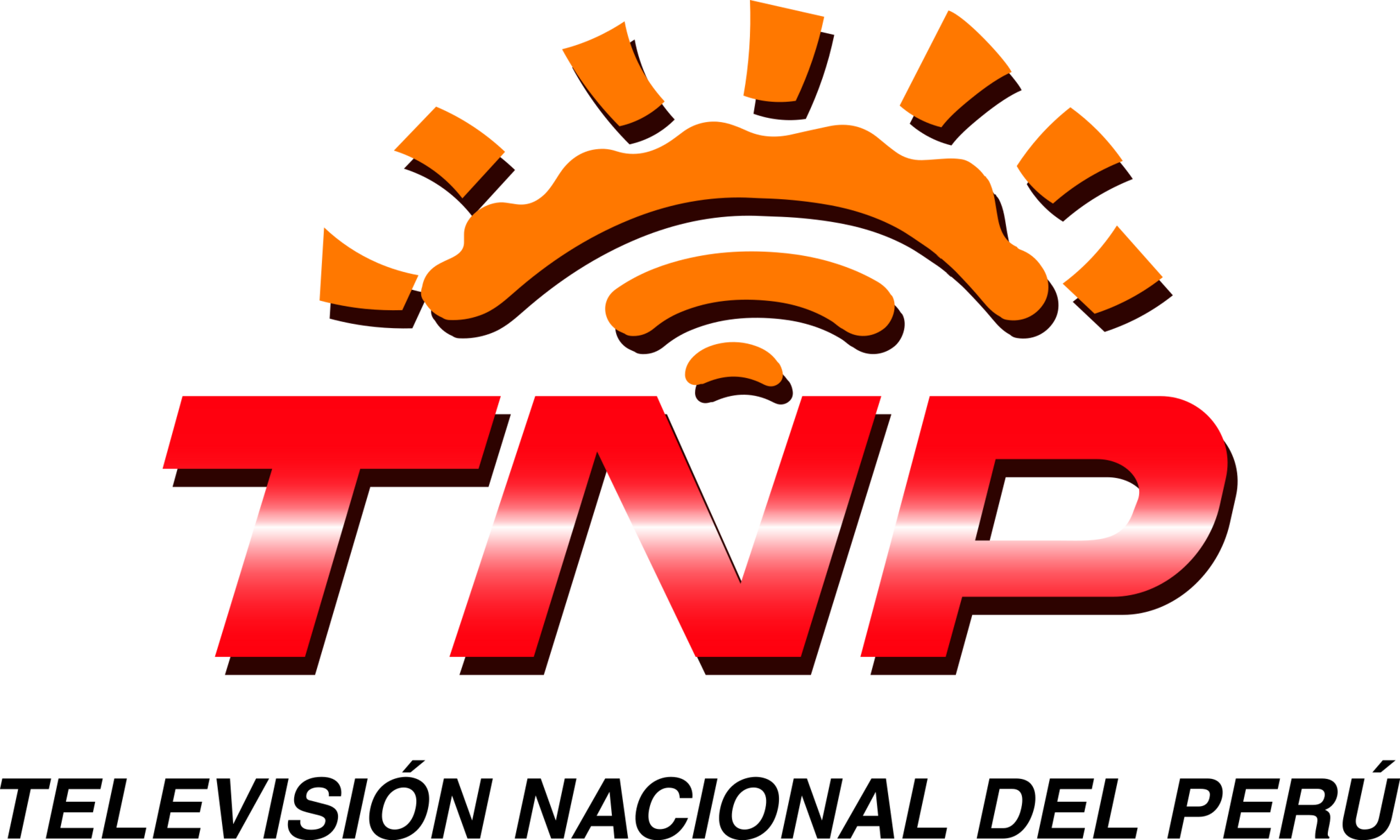
1997-1999

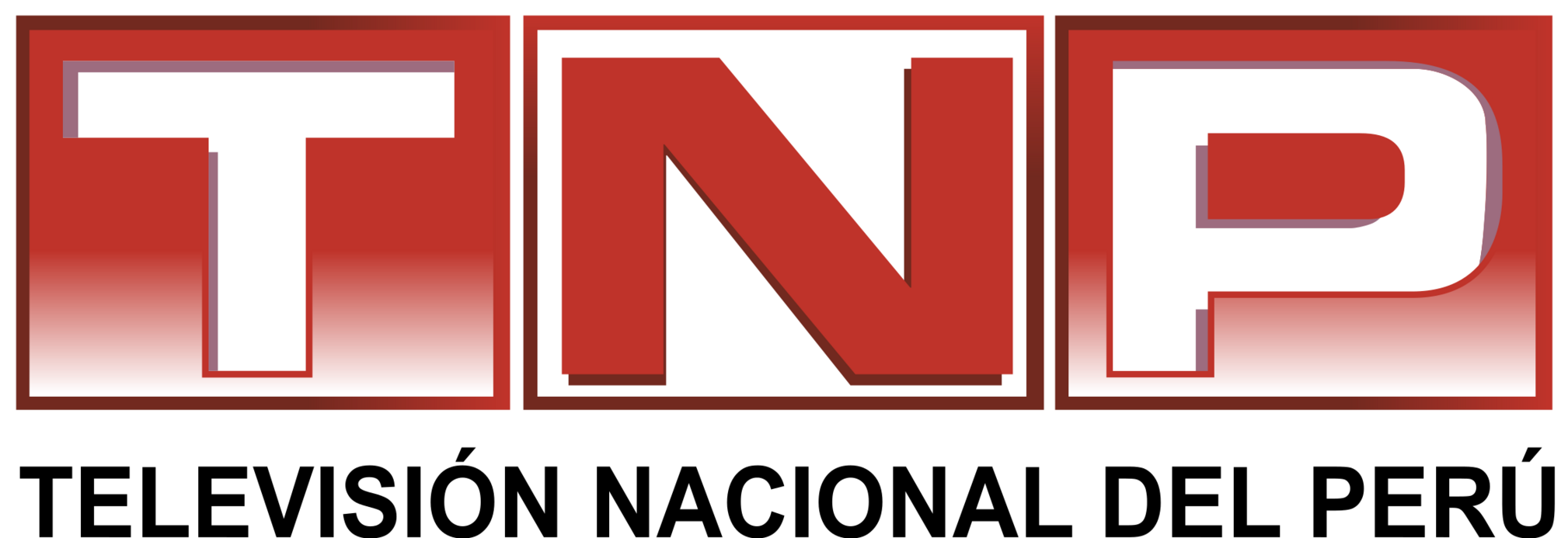
2001-2002

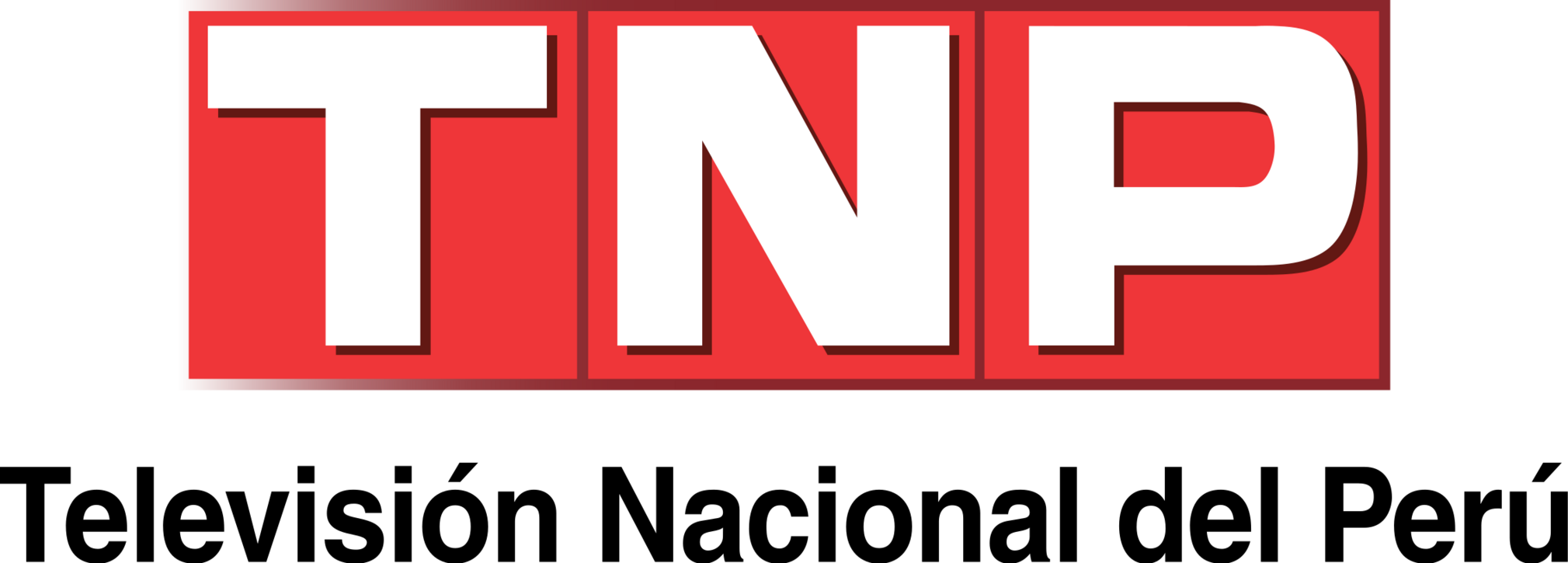
2006

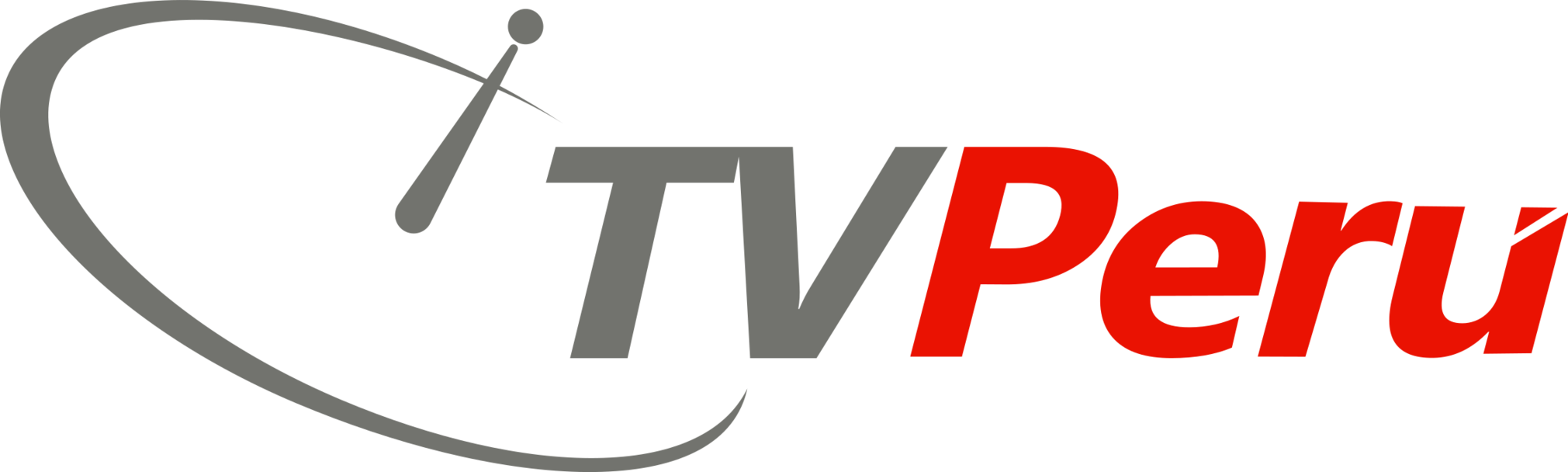
2006-2009

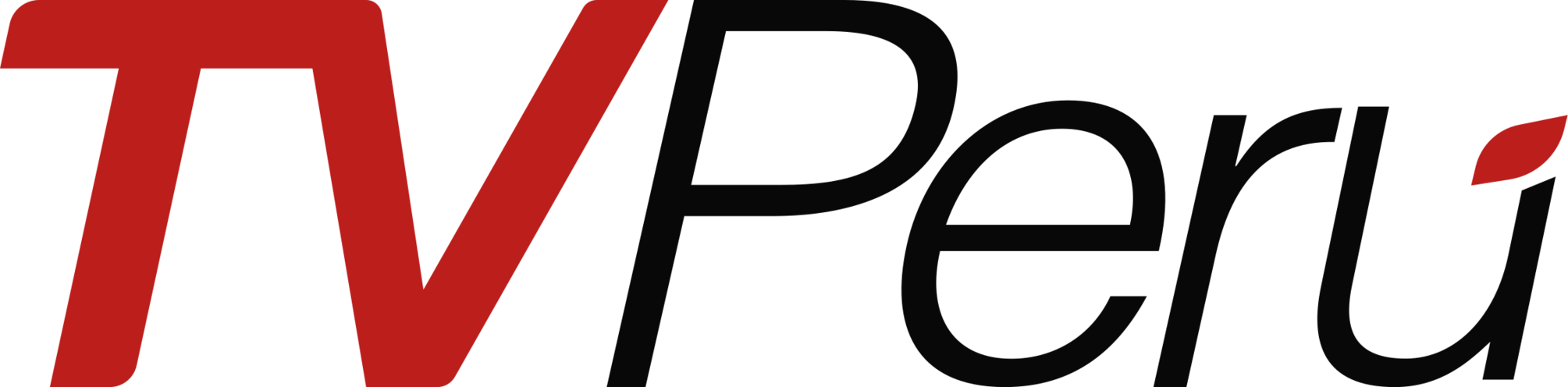
2009-2010

2010

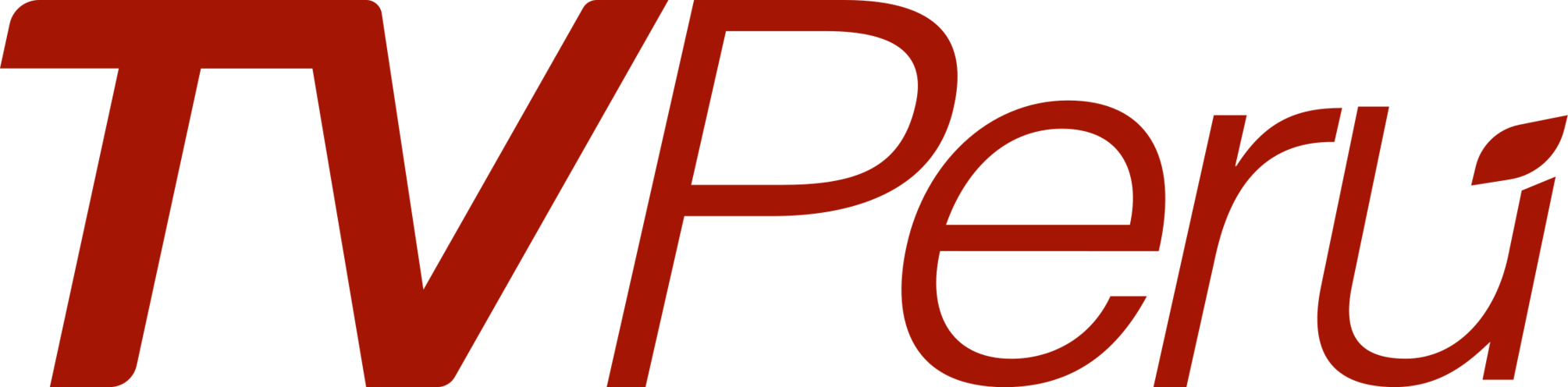
2010-2012

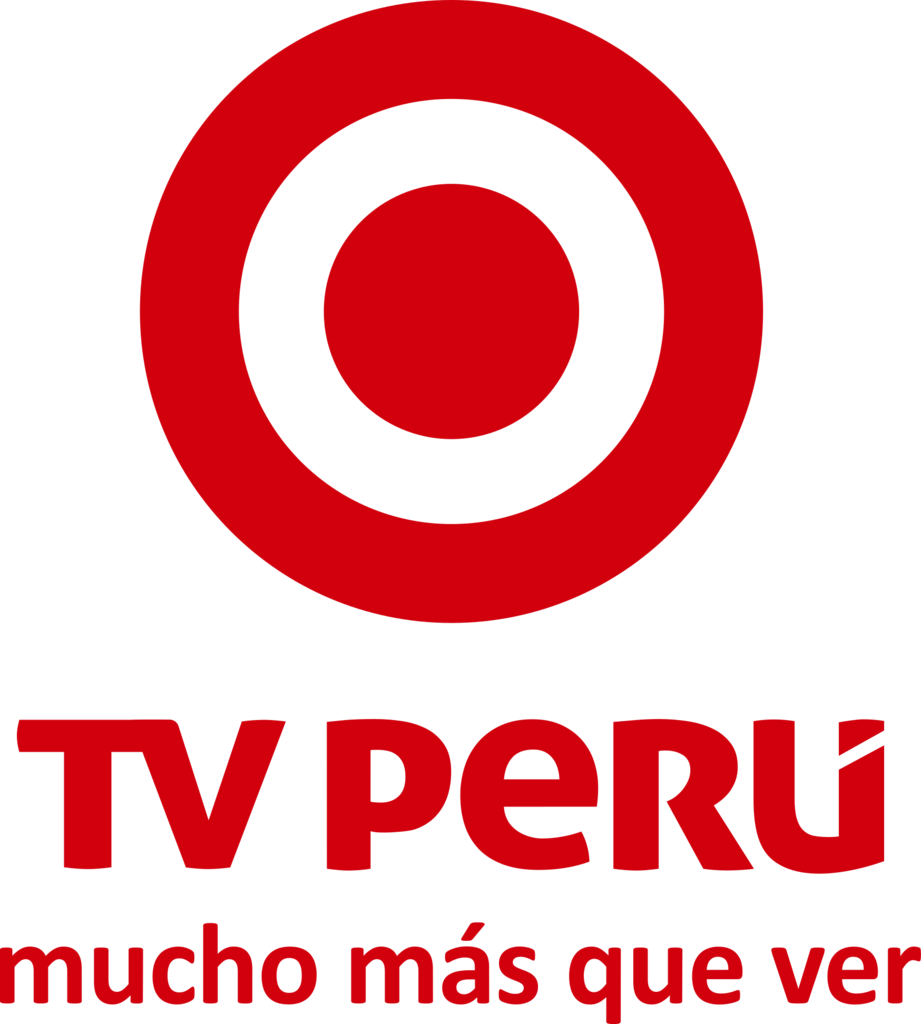
2012

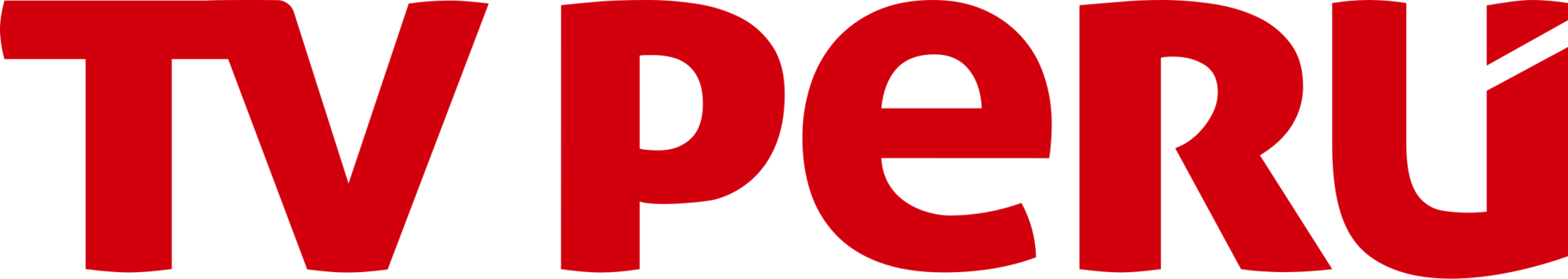
2012-2013

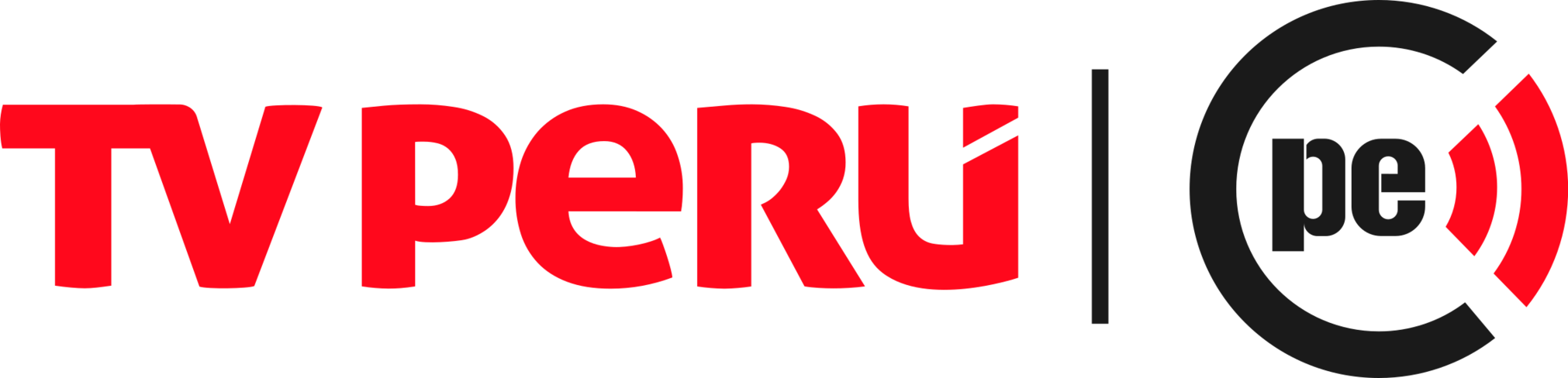
2013-2019

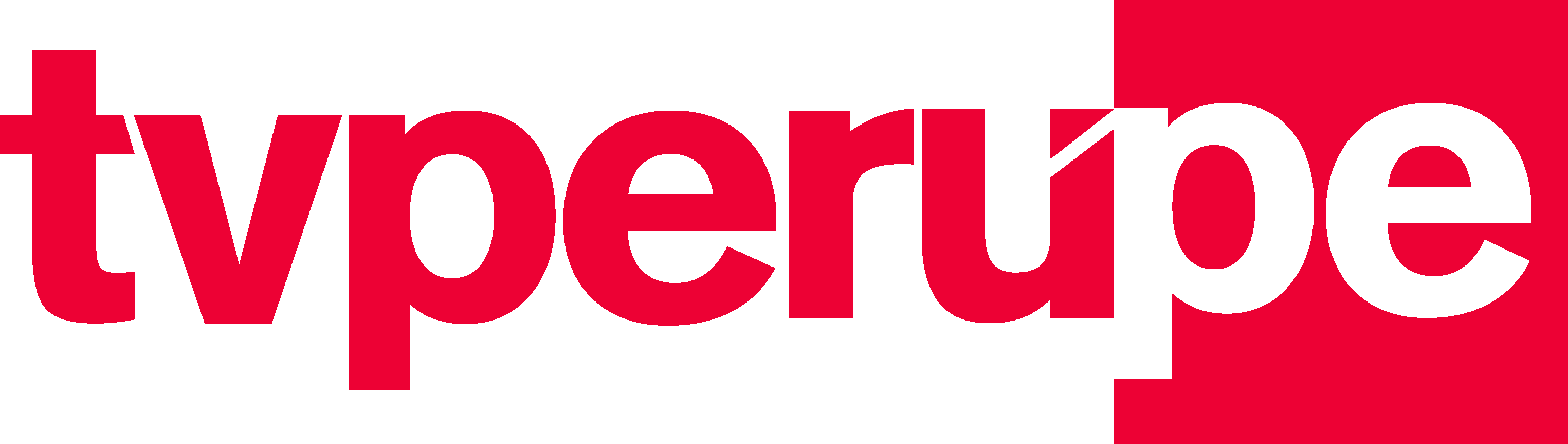
2019–present

== See also ==
- TV Perú Noticias
- Canal IPe
