= Mass media in Equatorial Guinea =

The mass media in Equatorial Guinea is primarily run by the state. Radio and Television Asonga (see below) are not officially run by the state, but by people close to the administration.

There is no free press in Equatorial Guinea. According to the BBC, "It is impossible for the media to criticise the president and the security forces, says Reporters Without Borders" and "Freedom House says almost all domestic news coverage is orchestrated or tightly controlled by the government."

== Print ==
Newspapers published in the Spanish language include:

- Ébano (state-owned)
- La Gaceta (monthly)
- La Nacion
- La Opinión (weekly)
- El Tiempo
- La Verdad
- La voz del pueblo

There is an opposition digital newspaper, based in Spain:

- Diario Rombe

== Radio ==
There are state-run radio stations:

- Radio Bata
- Radio Malabo
- Radio Nacional de Guinea Ecuatorial
- Voie de Kie Ntem

There is a radio station owned by the son of the president:

- Radio Asonga

== Television ==
There exist two state-run television stations, one in Malabo (TVGE) and one in Bata.

In addition, Television Asonga broadcasts from Malabo.

Subscription television channels from Spain (such as Fox, La 1, MTV, Disney Channel, among others) are received by the population via cable and satellite TV providers.

== Internet Media ==
- GuineaInfoMarket - Diario de Información económica de Guinea Ecuatorial
- AHORAEG Guinea Ecuatorial - Diario online líder de noticias

== See also ==
- Communications in Equatorial Guinea
