= Canal IPe =

Peruvian state-owned television network

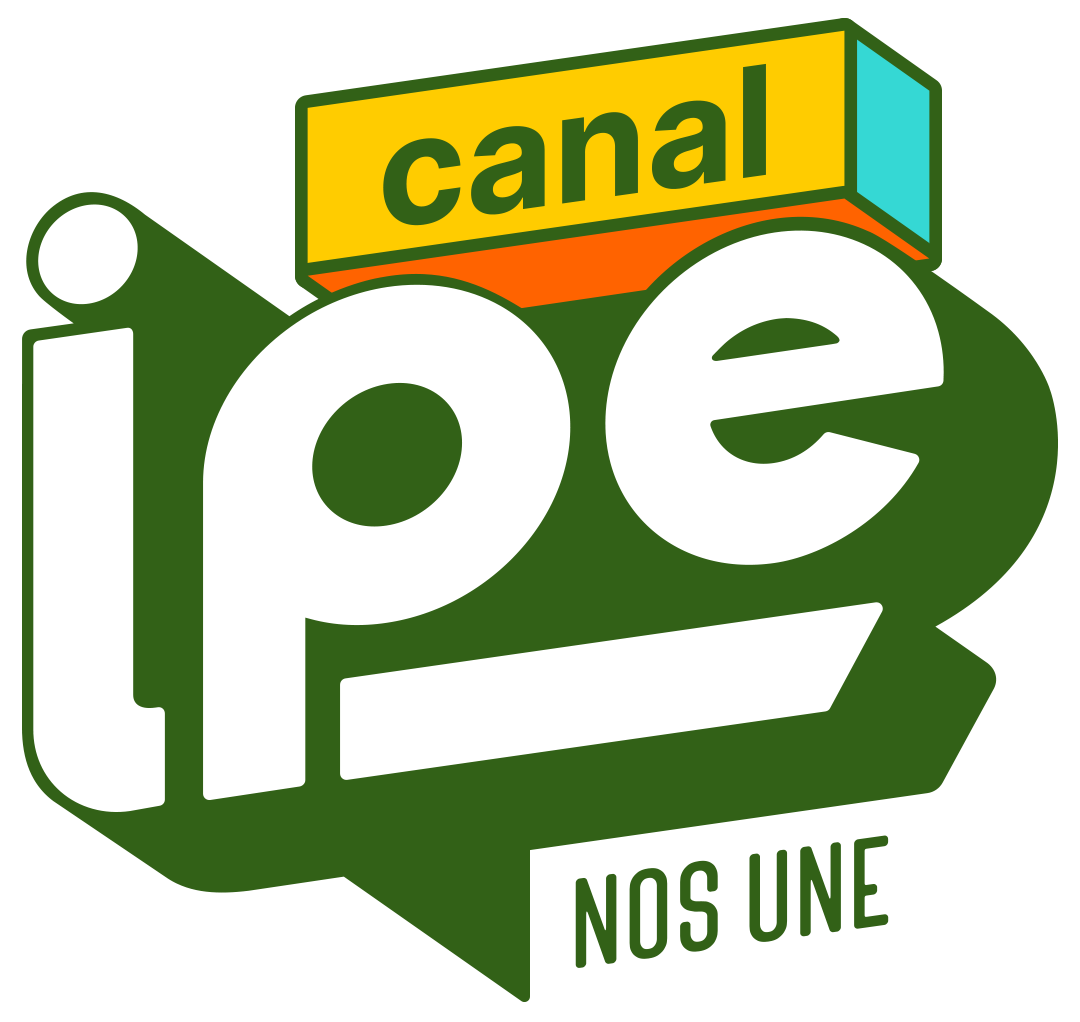
- Country: Peru
- Broadcast area: Peru

Programming
- Picture format: 1080i HDTV (downscaled to 480i for the SDTV feed)

Ownership
- Owner: National Institute of Radio and Television of Peru

History
- Launched: July 1, 2016

Links
- Website: www.canalipe.gob.pe

Availability

Terrestrial
- Digital VHF: Channel 7.4 (Lima, listings may vary)

Canal IPe (formerly IPe or Identidad Peruana) is the children and youth network of Peruvian state broadcaster IRTP. It launched in July 2016, replacing TV Perú 7.4, being broadcast on subchannel .4 of the TV Perú multiplexes.

== History ==
=== Background ===
Televisión Nacional del Perú (now TV Perú) had previously aired a children's programming block, consisting largely of productions from NHK, the BBC and PBS up until the late 2000s. It also attempted original productions such as Sábado chico (2001–2002) and De vuelta y media (2003–2004), the first of which presented by kids and aimed at them. Since then, this caused concerns in the state channel's programming, as its cultural programming lacked interest for the coming generations.

During 2015, the increase of programs classified as trash TV (reality shows, showbiz programming, etc.) produced by three of the country's largest television networks (Latina Televisión, América Televisión and ATV), being known for the march held that year, incited IRTP to plan the creation of a cultural channel aimed at children and the youth, with both original and imported programming.

For the president of IRTP's directorate, María Luisa Málaga, in an interview given to El Peruano, «kids and teens need their own slop» for the domain of the adult audience for television series, while Ojo noted that it would recover the former "white (as in "clean") television" strategy. To prepare for its launch, the Kusi Kusi block began in 2013 as part of TV Perú's schedule, which adapted the same format as the Argentine channel Pakapaka. Over time, it was renamed TV Perú Niños.

=== Launch ===
TV Perú announced the launch of IPe Identidad Peruana in late June, with a brief promo. On July 1, 2016, the then-president of Peru, Ollanta Humala Tasso, visited IRTP's facilities to begin operations of the over-the-air signal on subchannel 7.4 of the DTT system, replacing TV Perú 7.4. On Movistar TV's digital cable system, the high-definition feed of the channel replaced TV Perú HD on channel 707. On July 4, the Chicos IPe block started on TV Perú, in two afternoon blocks, replacing TV Perú Niños.

With ten hours of new content a day, IPe became the "first local media outlet with exclusive programming for kids and teens".

During its first days on air, it premiered national programs such as Clan Destino, a magazine program showing stories of young Peruvian entrepreneurs; Cortos IPe and Creaturas, programs dedicated to filmmaking in Peru, and the Chicos IPe block which contained programs such as Los Cazaventuras, La Lleva Perú, La Hora Popap and Cocinando con Miko Ondas.

In 2017, IPe premiered programs such as Inéditos, Ciencia en Esencia, Lutieres, Acción Voluntaria and the second season of Creaturas.

From April 5, 2018, IPe, alongside TV Perú Noticias, changed its aspect ratio from 4:3 letterbox to 16:9 widescreen. The next day, the SD feed was added to Movistar TV on channel 319 and 772 in HD, on its digital cable service.

In 2020, it premiered the first production in Ashaninka languages, Quechua and Aymara, produced by Polirama, Ciudad jardín. The program was also sent to the CNTV Infantil block, supported by the National Television Council. In 2022, it announced the import of three NHK titles to air on the channel.

In May 2023, it launched the anti-bullying campaign No es juego, which also aired on other state channels. According to Fernando Reátegui, director of content, the channel adopting a casting policy based on feedback from children before taking part in the programs. Children were only selected if they felt comfortable with the experience.
