= Postage stamps and postal history of Equatorial Guinea =

A 1999 stamp of Equatorial Guinea typical of the colourful modern issues of this country

This is a survey of the postage stamps and postal history of Equatorial Guinea, formerly known as Spanish Guinea.

== Spanish colonies ==
=== Fernando Po ===
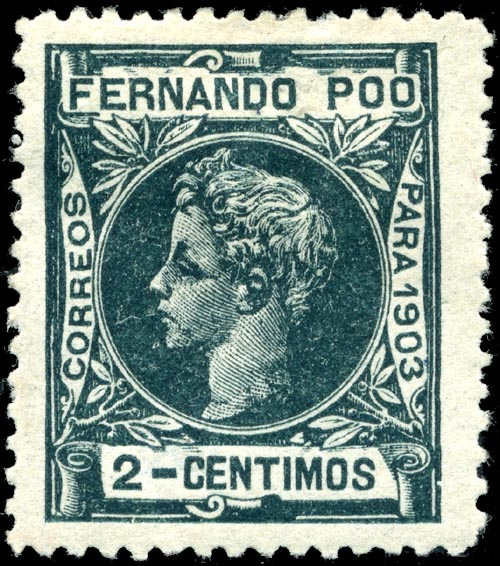
A 1903 stamp of Fernando Po

Stamps for the island of Fernando Po were first issued in 1868 by the Spanish colonial authorities in the capital Santa Isabel.

=== Río Muni ===
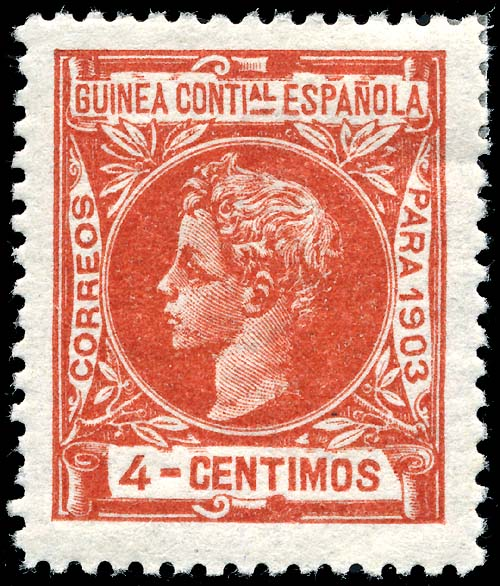
A 1903 stamp of Guinea Continental Española

Stamps inscribed "Guinea Continental Española" were issued for the continental enclave of Río Muni from 1902 to 1909.

=== Elobey, Annobón and Corisco ===
The colony consisting of the islands of Elobey Grande, Elobey Chico, Annobón and Corisco in the Gulf of Guinea issued its own postage stamps between 1903 and 1910.

== Spanish Guinea ==
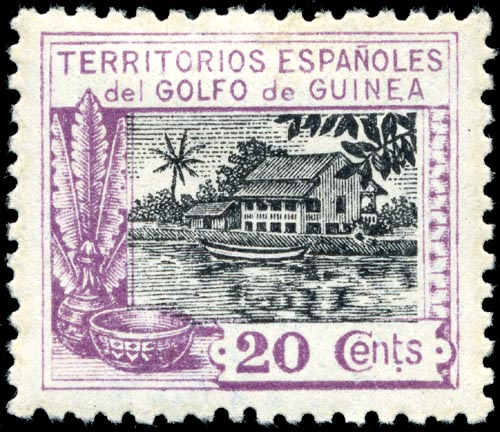
A 1924 stamp of Spanish Guinea

Stamps inscribed "Territorios Españoles del Golfo de Guinea" (Spanish Territories of the Gulf of Guinea) and later "Guinea Española" (Spanish Guinea) were issued from 1909 to 1959 for Spanish territories in the Guinea region, replacing those of individual colonies.

== Spanish provinces ==
From 30 July 1959 to 11 October 1968, Fernando Poo and Río Muni were treated as overseas provinces of Spain until they combined to form Equatorial Guinea on 12 October 1968.

Fernando Poo and Río Muni originally used postage stamps of Spanish Guinea until 1960 when the Spanish government decreed the use of separate issues for Río Muni and Fernando Po.

=== Fernando Po ===
The first definitive series for Fernando Poo as a province were issued on 25 February 1960.

=== Río Muni ===
The first stamps of Río Muni were issued on 27 April 1960. The first definitive series consisted of nine values, 25 c to 10 p, all with the same design showing a missionary and a native boy reading, and inscribed "RÍO MUNI".

Issues from 1961 on added the inscription "ESPAÑA"; typically two to three issues per year, consisting of two to four stamps each, and usually depicting local plants and animals. Another definitive series appeared in 1964, also with nine values. The last issue of Río Muni was a set of three signs of the zodiac issued on 25 April 1968.

== Independence ==
Equatorial Guinea became an independent republic on 12 October 1968 and its first stamps as such were issued on that date.

Upon achieving independence from Spain, Francisco Macias Nguema was elected the first president of Equatorial Guinea. By May 1971, Nguema controlled a government that essentially performed no functions except internal security. From 1972 to 1979, the country's main post office was padlocked and completely inoperative. Nonetheless, European agents continued to produce postage stamps for Equatorial Guinea that were promoted by so-called press releases from Madrid, Spain. With the exception of the first four issues and another two from 1973, it is doubtful that any stamps between 1972 and 1979 even reached Equatorial Guinea, much less placed on sale there for postage purposes. Most stamp catalogues do not accept the stamps from this period as being legitimate.

Stamps from this period were of course very colourful and of a topical nature. They proved to be attractive to overseas stamp collectors and were readily available, mostly in packets of stamps.

From 1979 all stamps are designed and printed by the Spanish FNMT, since then a very moderated and decent stamp issuing policy is adopted.

== See also ==
- Gecotel – Public postal service operator in Equatorial Guinea
