= National Institute of Radio and Television of Peru =

State-owned telecommunications company in Peru

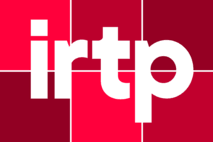
- Type: Radio and television company
- Industry: Telecommunications
- Predecessor: ENCRTP
- Founded: 1973; 53 years ago in Lima, Peru
- Headquarters: Santa Beatriz, Lima, Peru
- Area served: Peru
- Owner: Peruvian State; Ministry of Culture
- Website: gob.pe/irtp

The National Institute of Radio and Television of Peru (Spanish: Instituto Nacional de Radio y Televisión del Perú, IRTP) is a Peruvian state-owned company that is responsible for managing the state's media, in radio, television and the Internet. It is property of the Peruvian State, is part of the Ministry of Culture and has administrative, economic and financial autonomy.

The IRTP manages the TV Perú television network, an international channel, a pay channel and three DTT signals, in addition to a radio network and two radio stations. In 2016, it had a budget of S/. 68 million.

== History ==
=== Background ===
OAX-AM (Radio Nacional del Perú) began its broadcasts in 1925 in the city of Lima; It was the first radio station in the country. On the other hand, OAD-TV (TV Perú) began broadcasting in 1958 on channel 7 of the VHF band in Lima as the country's second open television station. One of the first pioneering organizations in the production of content, such as the television series Nuestros Héroes de la Guerra del Pacífico, was the "National Institute of Teleeducation" (Spanish: Instituto Nacional de Teleducación). This institution, consolidated in the 1960s, was important for the production of educational content and prevailed in parallel with the future state media company until its closure in 1995.

In 1973, during the self-proclaimed Revolutionary Government of the Armed Forces, the National Radio Broadcasting Company of Peru (Spanish: Empresa Nacional de Radiodifusión del Perú, ENRAD Perú) was created, an entity that brought together Channel 7 of Lima and Radio Nacional, in addition to managing certain expropriated media such as Radio La Crónica AM or Channel 9 in Lima. In parallel and until the end of the regime, the commercial shareholders of the América and Panamericana television networks founded the company Telecentro, a subsidiary in charge of programming production for both stations, in response to the expropriation of 51% of their shares by the State. During this time, at the end of 1976, Channel 7 in Lima began to progressively broadcast in colour, producing all of its programming in this technology in 1979.

In 1981, months after the second government of Fernando Belaúnde Terry began, ENRAD Peru was reorganized under the name Peruvian Film, Radio and Television Company (Spanish: Empresa de Cine, Radio y Televisión Peruana, ENCRTP) and was temporarily assigned to the National System of Social Communication (Spanish: Sistema Nacional de Comunicación Social, SINACOSO). Furthermore, in that same year, Channel 7 of Lima changed its name to Radio Televisión Peruana (RTP) and began satellite transmissions. This last event allowed it to increase and consolidate its coverage at the national level since, until then, its repeater stations in the rest of the country retransmitted the programming of the main station in Lima via microwave. There were plans to form the Production Center for original content in 1982; However, the company had trouble establishing what content was profitable when it retired programming educational content in 1984.

RTP was the main attempt to become public and commercially competitive broadcasting. Furthermore, in 1985, regional subsidiaries were established under the name sociedad anónima. However, that corporation entered an ambiguous situation due to its editorial dependence on the government of the day. It was liquidated in 1996 by former president Alberto Fujimori. Also during Fujimori's government, both SINACOSO and ENCRTP were unified into a single entity renamed to its current name (IRTP) in 1997.

=== Denomination change ===
In the early 2000s, Valentín Paniagua's government undertook a restructuring of the IRTP. This initiative involved the recruitment of professionals without political ties, as well as the incorporation of new presenters with different perspectives. Additionally, the IRTP launched Radio Filarmonía, a station specialized in classical music and opera, in agreement with the Radio Filarmonía.

In 2004, an international television channel was planned on the Lima UHF band, called TNP 2 (currently TV Perú 7.2), with programming differentiated from TNP. However, the project was rejected at the end of Alejandro Toledo's government. In 2007, the focus was on investing in the news sector at the local and regional level, acquiring transmitters (19 UHF and 18 VHF) to expand coverage to 13 million viewers.

Following the restructuring, the IRTP came under the direct supervision of the Prime Minister. Subsequently, between July 2010 and January 2012, it was temporarily subordinated to the Ministry of Culture. Since the government of Pedro Pablo Kuczynski, the IRTP has remained attached to said Ministry.

=== Digitalisation era ===
The IRTP increased its production of its own content after María Luisa Málaga assumed the position of board of directors and executive president of the IRTP in 2012. The news channel TV Perú 7.3 was launched on November 3, 2013, after acquiring an old building in the San Borja District and counting on a new investment to renew its technical equipment. Additionally, on December 2 of that same year, it launched TV Perú 7.4, a cultural channel. Since the beginning of 2015, the children's programming block TV Perú niños has been broadcast on TV Perú. On July 1, 2016, TV Perú 7.4 was replaced by Canal IPe, a children's and cultural channel. In the field of radio, the FM frequency reached 53% of the national territory, while its AM frequency reached 14.6% and Radio La Crónica, 29%.

On August 3, 2016, the writer and journalist Hugo Coya was appointed as president of the board due to the resignation of María Luisa Málaga. At that time the institute managed to raise 12% of its advertising budget. However, Coya resigned from the presidency of the board due to the pardon granted by the then President Pedro Pablo Kuczynski to Alberto Fujimori. Then, the Ministry of Culture appointed journalist Eduardo Guzmán Iturbe to serve as president of the board of directors of this conglomerate.

In 2019, the IRTP decided to renew all its television media and proposed new plans and alternatives. That year, the 2019 Pan American and Parapan American Games were broadcast. In addition, it proposed to produce its own fiction programmes to export to other networks and thus reduce its dependence on the State.

Subsequently, management chose to renew its information system, add new programs and include new services. Nacional TV (later renamed TV Perú 7.2) was launched and in March 2020, both Nacional TV and TV Perú Noticias began rebroadcasting TV Perú's programming due to the government's COVID-19 emergency decree. In April 2020, the Ministry of Education decreed the launch of "Aprendo en casa", a virtual education television channel aimed at students throughout Peru, which is planned to become an independent channel when the satellite hub service is completed in 2024.

In 2020, the government of Francisco Sagasti announced the reorganization of the IRTP, as did the National Superintendence of University Higher Education.

== Logo history ==
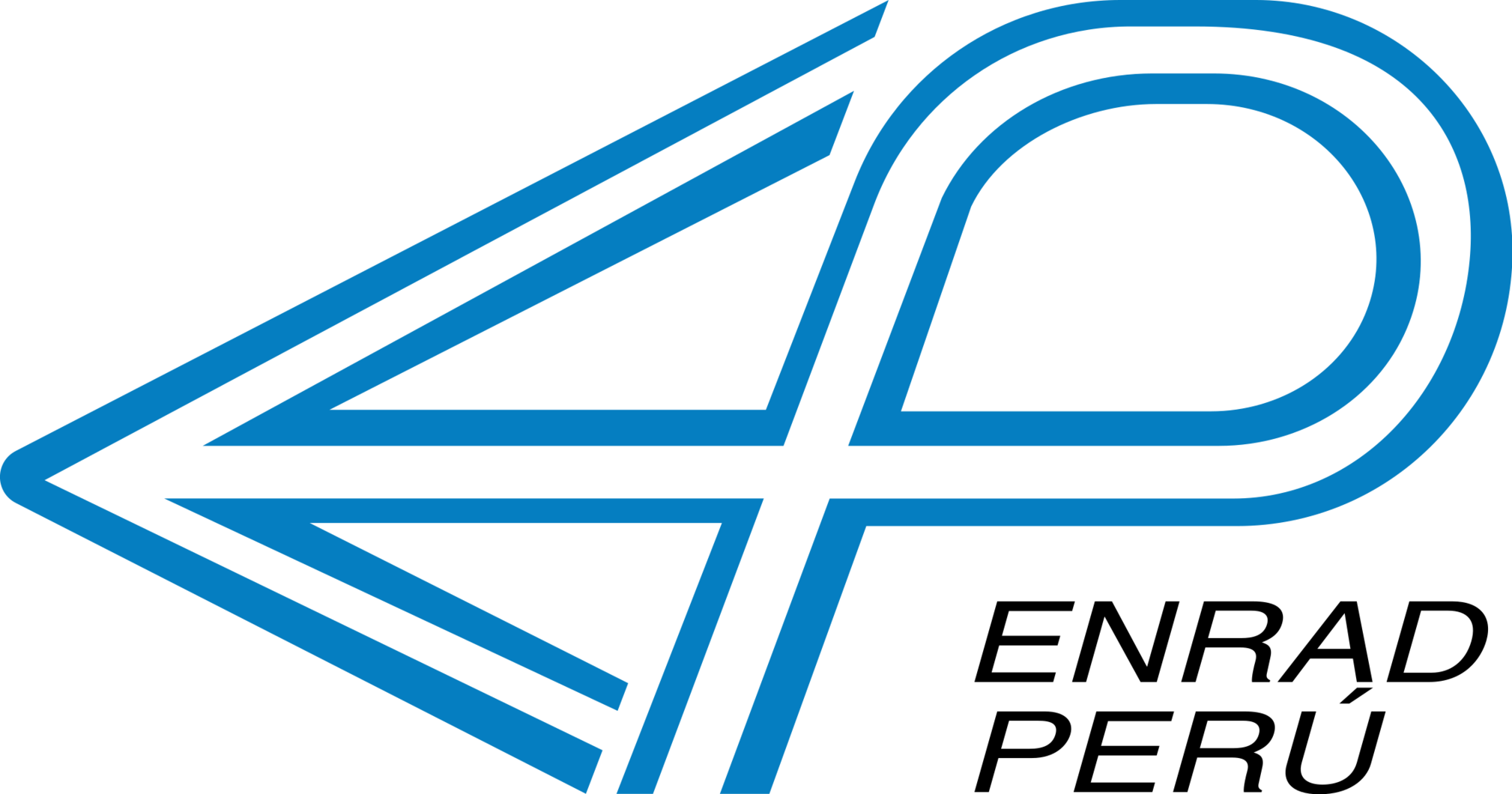
1974-1980

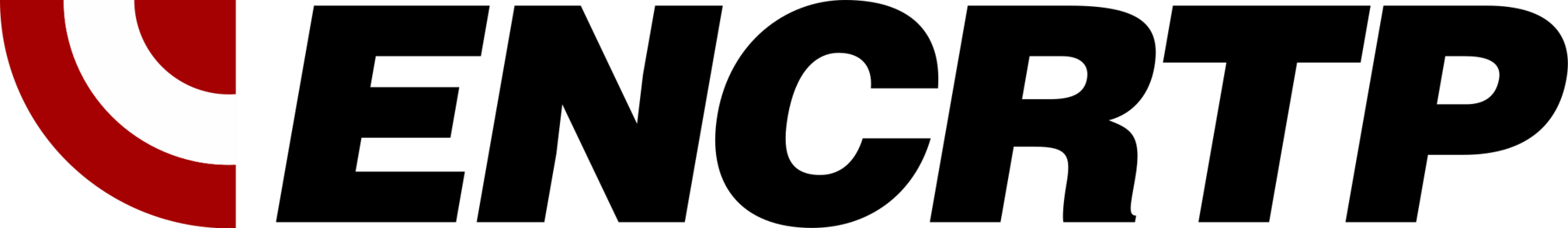
1981-1982

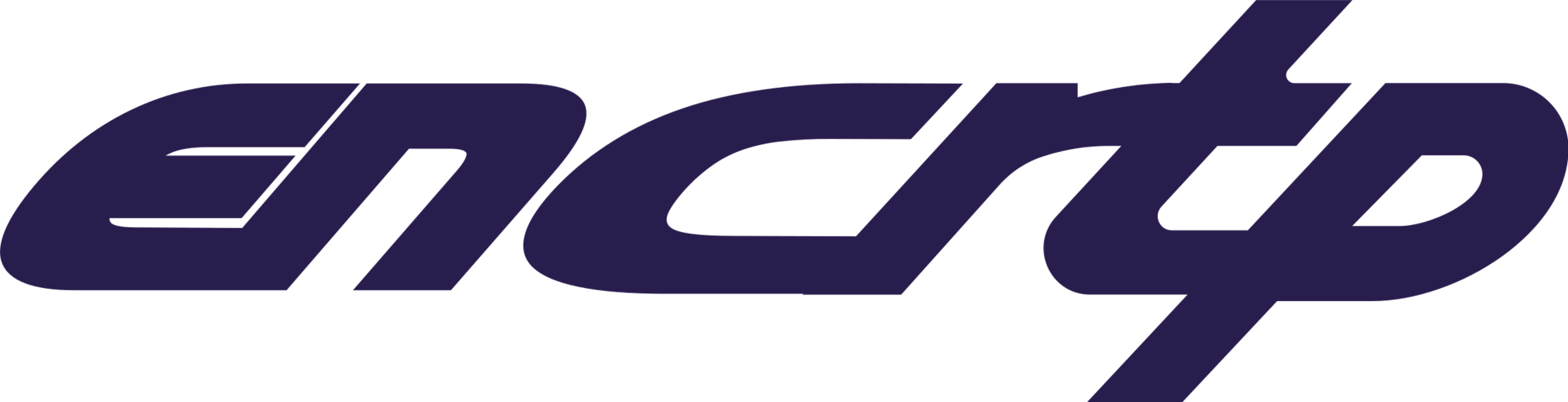
1982-1997

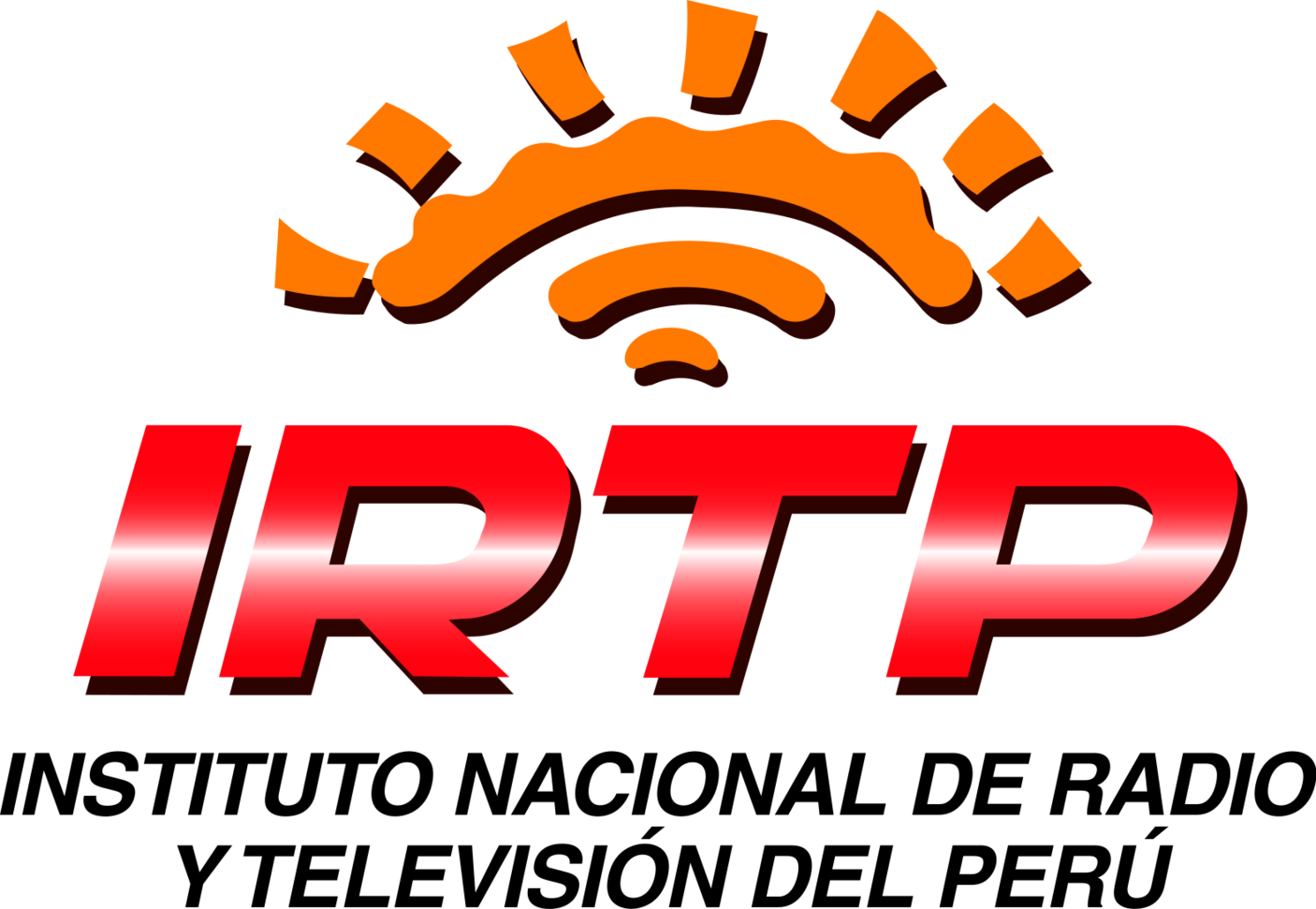
1997-2000

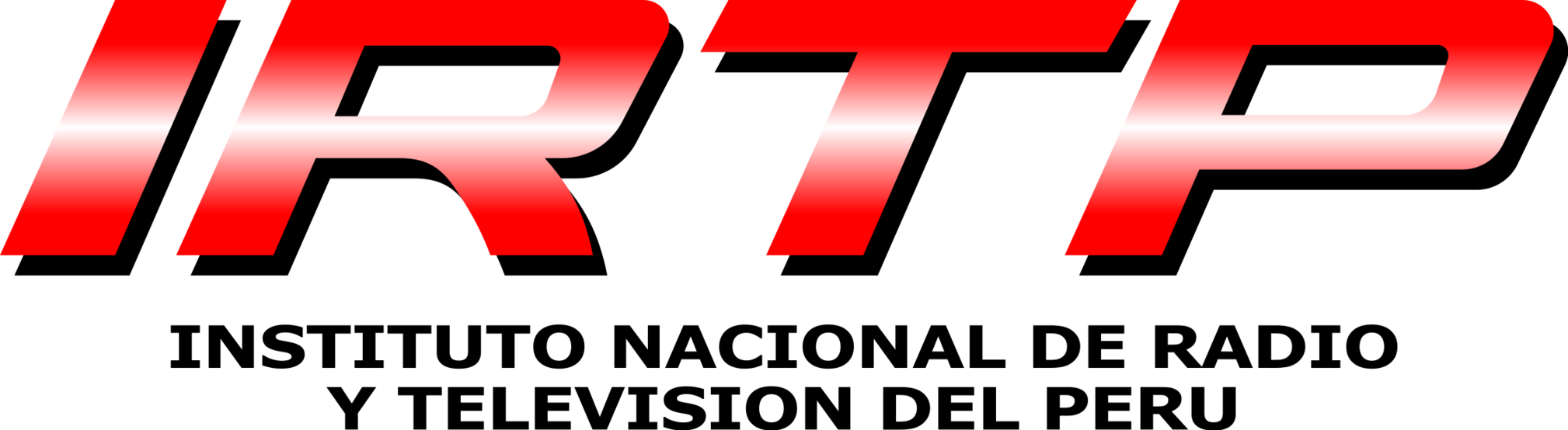
2000-2007

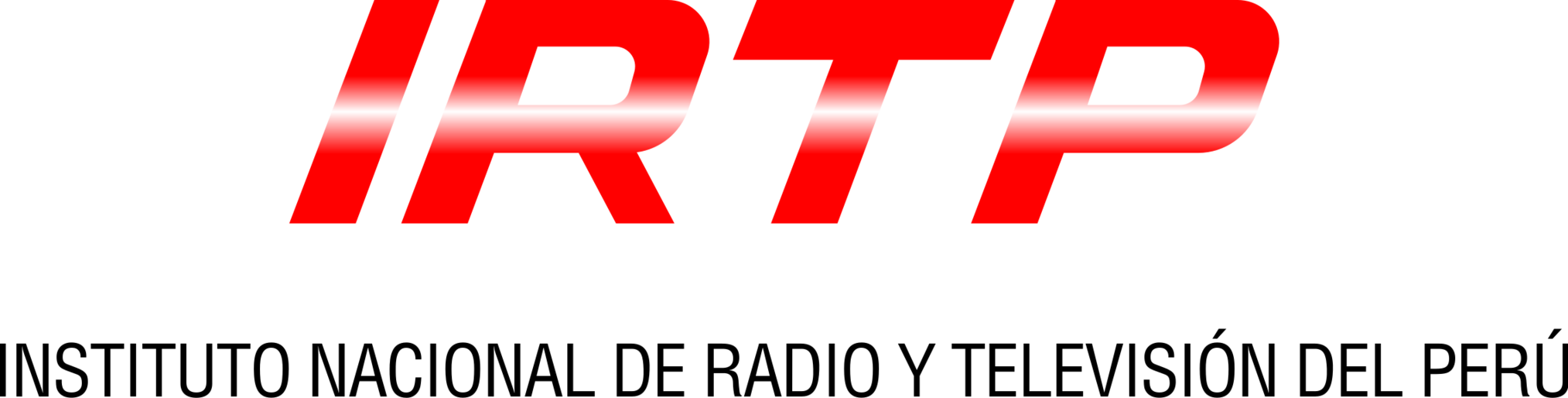
2007-2013

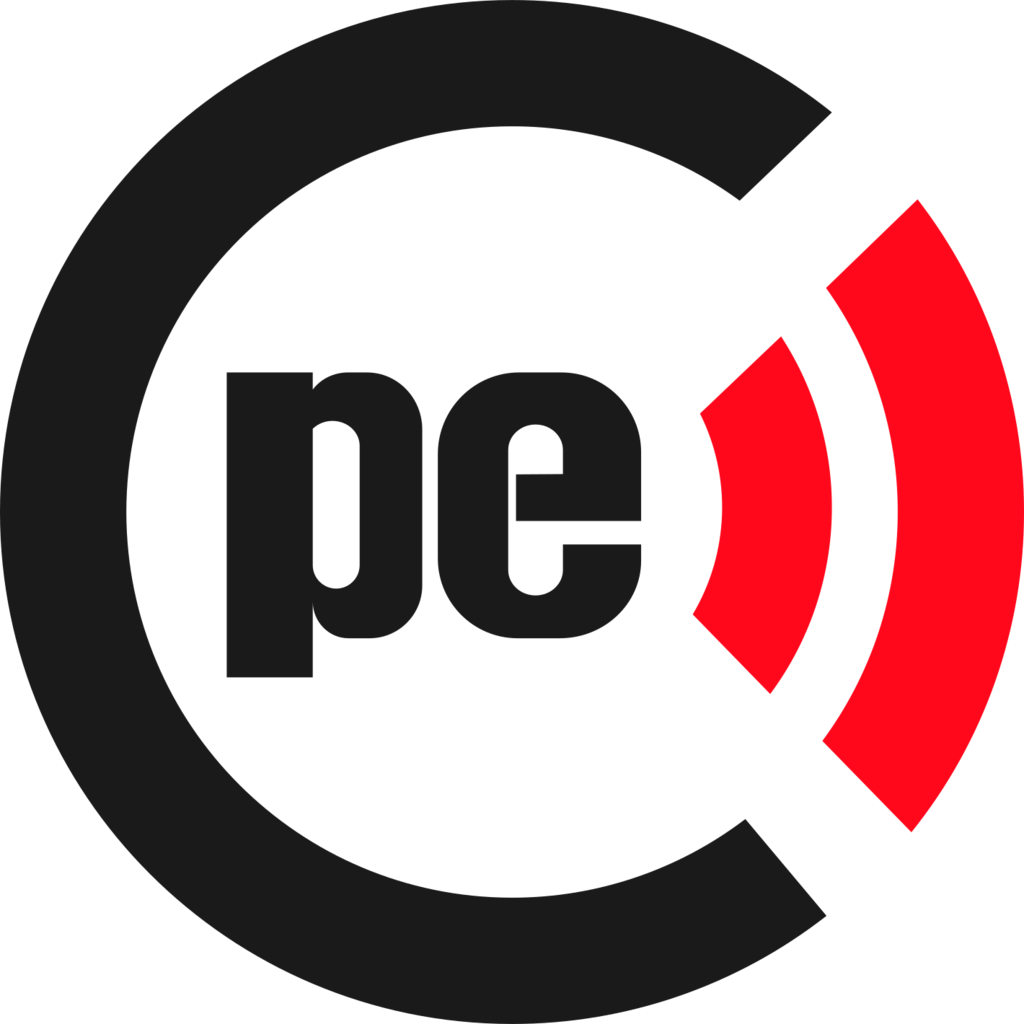
2013-2019

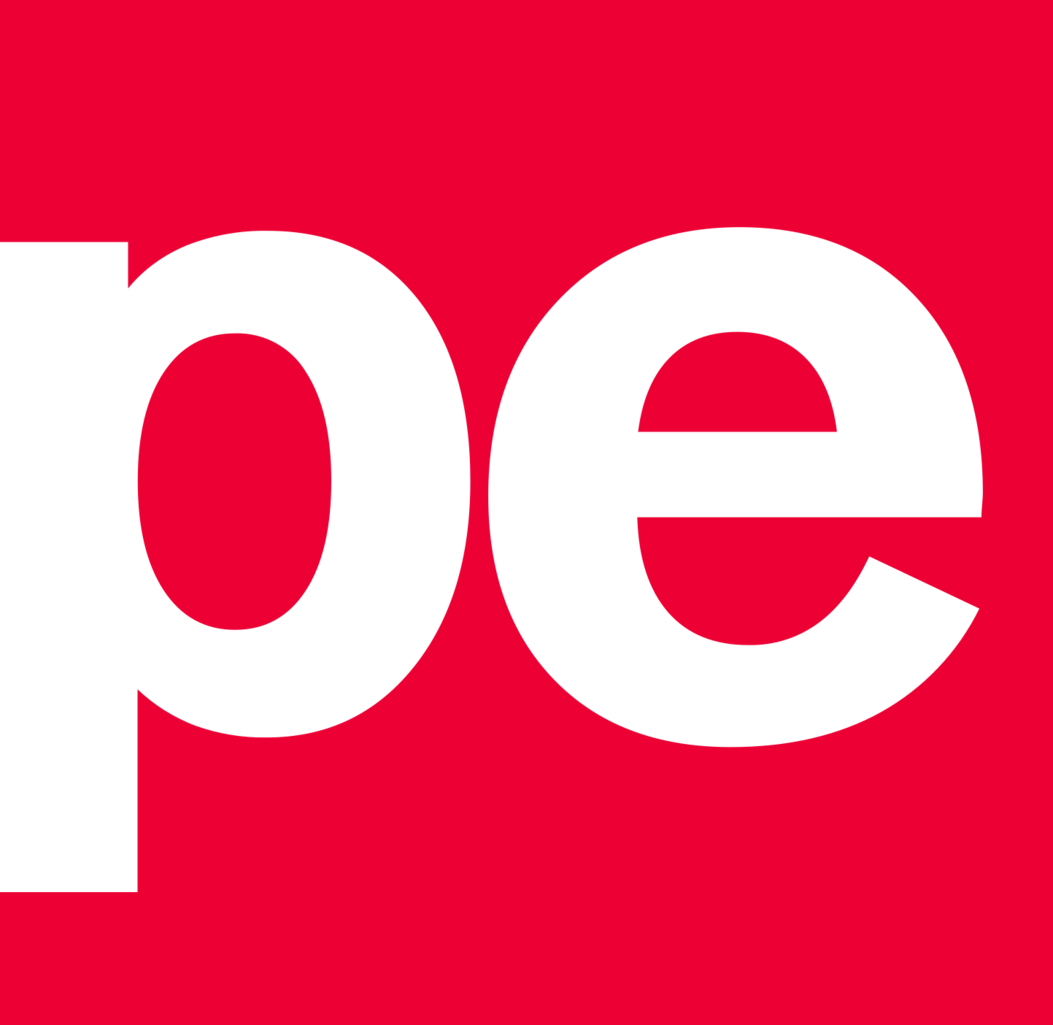
2019-2020

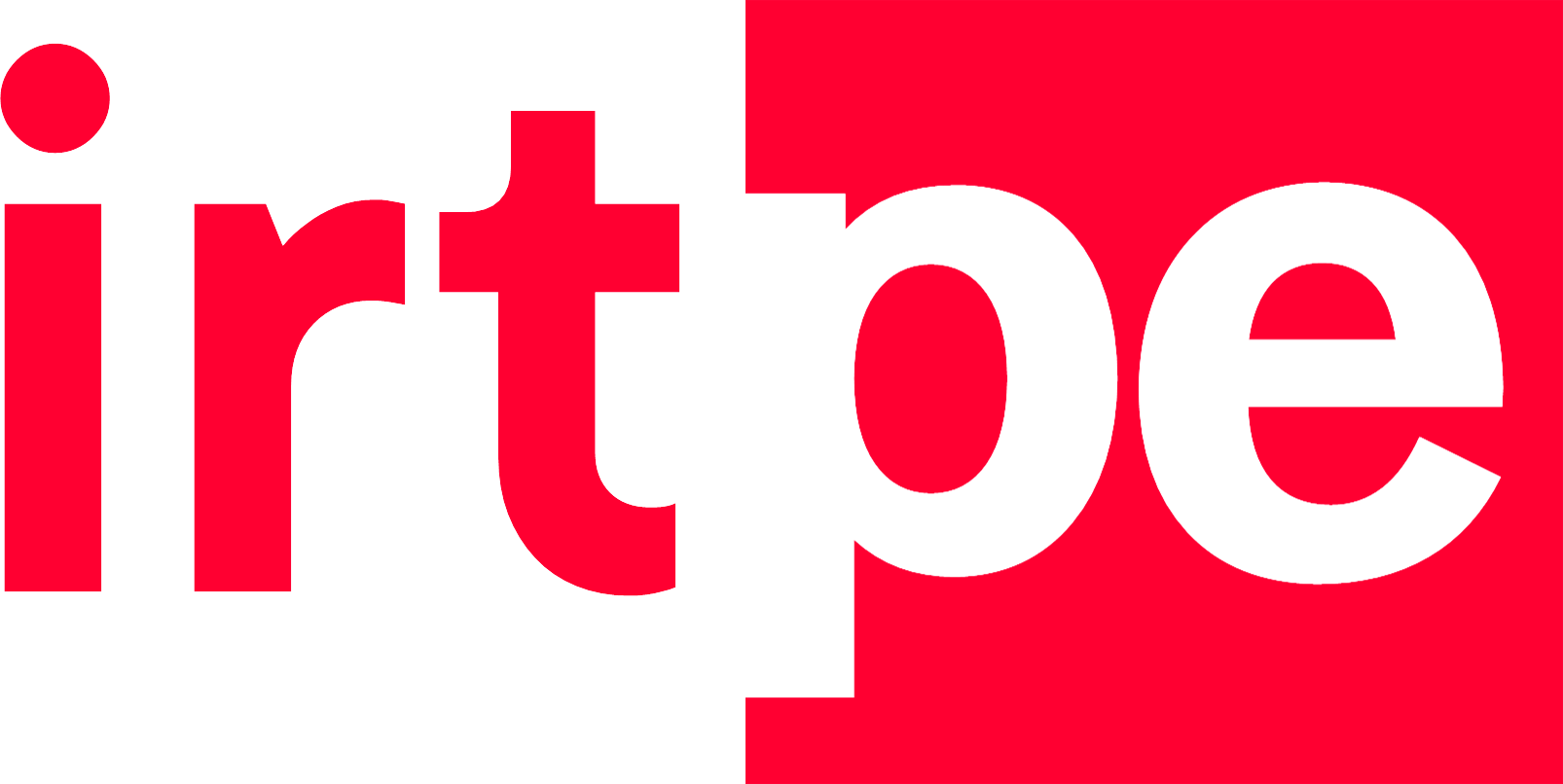
2020-2021

== See also ==
- Telecommunications in Peru
