= Radio Nacional del Perú =

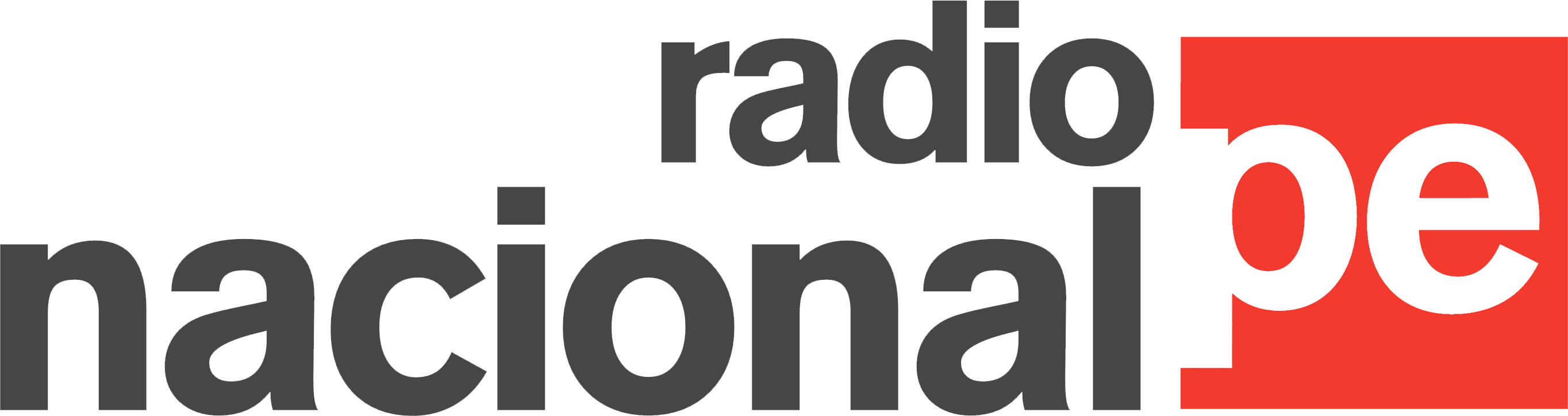
- Peru
- Broadcast area: Peru (nationwide)
- Frequencies: AM: various FM: various

Programming
- Languages: Spanish, Quechua, Aymara

Ownership
- Owner: National Institute of Radio and Television of Peru (IRTP)

History
- First air date: 20 June 1925; 101 years ago

Links
- Webcast: radionacional.com.pe/envivo
- Website: radionacional.gob.pe

Radio Nacional del Perú is the first and the oldest radio station in Peru. It had its origins in the private station Lima OAX-AM, owned by the Peruvian Broadcasting Company, which was founded in 1924 by César A. Coloma, Santiago Acuña among others, and started broadcasting on June 20, 1925, after five days of test broadcasts that had started on June 15.

== Background ==
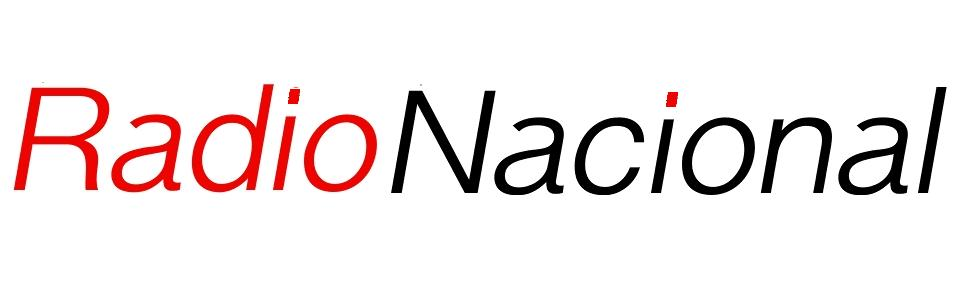
Logo of Radio Nacional del Perú used from 2008 to 2012

The OAX official performance was linked to the sale of "Marconi" brand radio receptors. From 9:00 to 11:00, it broadcast non-professionally formatted programs including readings, opera arias and classical music recitals, all of them performed by amateurs. OAX was officially launched by president Augusto B. Leguía on June 20, 1925.

Radio programs were still something new in Lima, but they could not compete with the then live night shows. Therefore, OAX soon declared bankruptcy and, by government resolution of September 6, 1926, the Peruvian State took over under the administration of Joaquín de Azambuja, who, as he was instructed, turned the company into a broadcaster for government messages and public interest event information.

== Official launch ==
In 1937, OA4X was renamed as Radio Nacional del Perú OAX-4A, affix of the Peruvian radio and television in open signal. Its limited programming was broadcast from the Government Palace, the Congress of the Republic, Lima Cathedral, San Marcos University, the Catholic University, the National Academy of Music, Entre Nous Society, and the former Santa Beatriz horse racecourse.

The launch of Radio Nacional del Perú heralded a new era in Peruvian radio history ever since its debut in 1925–1936. A new law favored commercial radio broadcasts on such topics as entertainment. What followed is a flourishing of the arts and entertainment. The period from Radio Nacional's launch to 1957 just before television's debut is considered the golden age of radio in Peru.

On January 30, 1937, the representative of the Marconi's Wireless Telegraph Co. Ltd, Miguel McNulty Goupil, launched the Peru National Radio (Radio Nacional del Perú) Official Broadcasting Station OAX 4-A-854 ½ kc (long- wave) / 10 kilowatts; And OAX 4-Z-49.24 m (short-wave) / 14 kilowatts, at San Miguel quarters, Lima, Peru. The station, deemed the most powerful of the Pacific western coasts, was fully furnished with English-made machines and all what is required for daily programs with well-known social and artistic participants.

The opening counted with the musical frame of an orchestra of more than 30 musicians and led by the conductor of the National Philharmonic, Master Federico Gerdes. It was followed by the speeches of the President of the Republic, General Óscar R. Benavides and the Marconi general representative, Miguel McNulty. The latter had been appointed General Manager of the new broadcasting on January 16, 1937, maintaining his position at the Marconi.

Other positions held at the Peru National Radio: Guillermo Lazarte, Commercial Director, and Antonio Garland, artistic director.

Transmitter Site and Office: A short-wave and a long-wave transmitters were installed at San Miguel quarters, Lima, each one with 10 KW of power in the antenna or on the carrier wave. The made in England transmitters were the most modern in radioelectric technology. Two towers were erected for the antenna systems, as well as an Art Studio building at Av Petit Thouars.

Nowadays it belongs to the National Institute of Radio and Television of Peru.

== First radio programs ==
Initially, there were several blocks divided in "hours", such as "The Literary Hour", (La Hora Literaria) "The Home Hour" (La Hora del Hogar), "The Rotary Hour" (La Hora Rotaria), "The Amateur Hour" (La Hora del Aficionado) . Soloists and small bands used to perform in the latter, where many artists became famous, such as César Miró, who was also a radio presenter, literary writer and cineast. Likewise, Juan Sedó and Benjamín Puente were notable sport commentators followed by Augusto Ferrando, who from December 23, 1934, was in charge of the horse race comments from Santa Beatriz Racecourse (Hipódromo de Santa Beatriz).

On January 30, 1937, President Óscar R. Benavides relaunched the renewed "Peru National Radio" (Radio Nacional del Perú) at the same venue it is nowadays. Doubtless, one of the most remembered programs was: "Enjoyable Grammar Chats" (Charlas de Gramática Amena) where Felipe Sassone "attacked" César Miró, who replied from his program "Smiling Chats on Geography" (Charlas de geografía risueña) in DUSA Radio. When this radio disappeared, César Miró became the artistic director of "Peru National Radio" in 1940. He took advantage of the radio studio space, creating an auditorium. This is the beginning of a live program era, which included more than 120 concerts by the National Symphonic Orchestra between 1940 and 1944; folkloric music with Yma Súmac and Florencio Coronado, and a primetime high-rating Peruvian creole music program named "Peruvian Saturday" (Sábado Peruano) directed by Alberto Martínez Gómez and presented by David Odría.

== The following years ==
The National Radio kept the country informed on the main national and international events, such as the end of the Second World War in 1945, the passing of Pope John XXIII, several presidential summits and all that has been part of the modern Peruvian history. From the early 1980s the radio has many subsidiaries in the whole country, which are connected via satellite.

== Present ==
The National Radio transmitted the passing of Pope John Paul II in 2005. On the other hand, the National Radio actively keeps live programs at the country's borders, supporting so the efforts of the Peruvian state in cementing a Peruvian pride in those far and difficult areas. This radio was also a useful link among the families and victims of the Pisco earthquake in 2007.

Peru National Radio was the Peruvian broadcasting leader and is currently having a technological potentiation, technical and human resource updating and a new programming.

== See also ==
- List of radio stations in Peru
- Media of Peru
