= Gecotel =

Public postal service operator in Equatorial Guinea

Correos y Telecomunicaciones de Guinea Ecuatorial
- Industry: Postal services, courier
- Headquarters: Calle Boncoro, Malabo, Equatorial Guinea
- Services: Letter post, parcel service, EMS, delivery, Financial services

Correos y Telecomunicaciones de Guinea Ecuatorial also known by its alias of Gecotel, is the public operator responsible for postal service in Equatorial Guinea. Arsenio Esono Afang is the director.

== See also ==
- Communications in Equatorial Guinea
