= Agriculture in Equatorial Guinea =

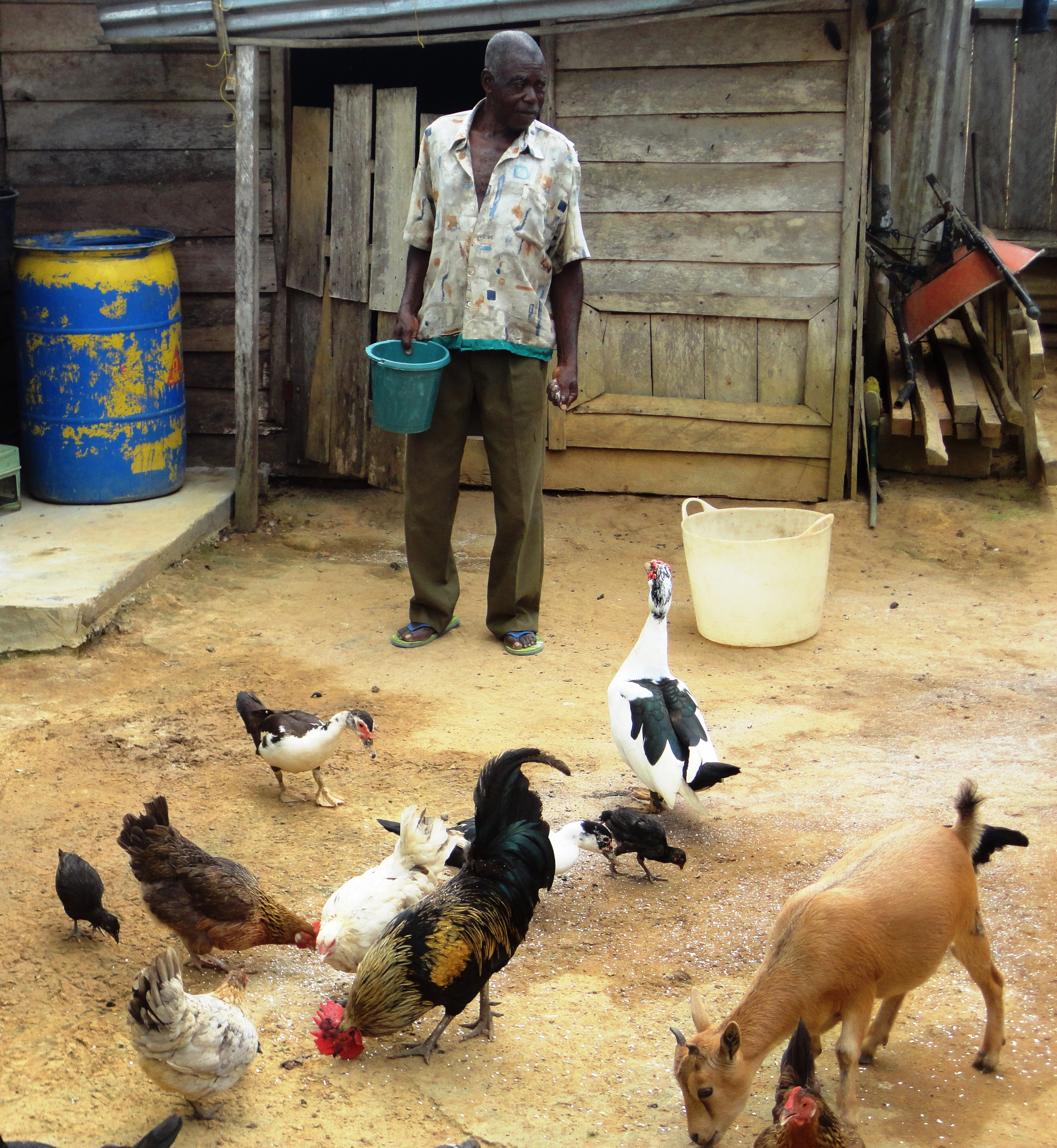
A farm in Equatorial Guinea.

Agriculture is a major sector of the economy in Equatorial Guinea. Farming accounts for approximately 2% of GDP as it contributes little to the export earnings of the country. In 2022, the Food and Agriculture Organization of the United Nations held its Africa regional conference in Malabo. One popular crop is Tabernanthe iboga which is used for traditional tribal medicine. The island of Bioko has a greater variety of tropical vegetation, including mangroves than the mainland.

The Government of Equatorial Guinea has used agriculture as a way to promote economic diversity. In 2021, crop production index for Equatorial Guinea was 102.2 index, growing at an average annual rate of 1.23%.
