= César Miró =

Peruvian writer and composer

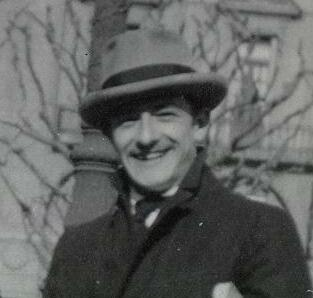
- Born: César Alfredo Miró Quesada Bahamonde; 7 June 1907 Miraflores District, Lima, Peru
- Died: 8 November 1999 (aged 92) Lima, Peru
- Children: 1

César Alfredo Miró Quesada Bahamonde (7 June 1907 – 8 November 1999), more commonly known as César Miró, was a Peruvian writer and composer. He wrote novels, stories, manuscripts, essays, and poetry.

== Early life ==
César Miró was born on 7 June 1907, in the Miraflores District in Lima, Peru. He studied in the San Agustín and La Inmaculada schools. He used to escape from his college classes to go visit the Biblioteca Nacional del Perú (the National Library of Peru) and submerge himself in books. At the age of 15, he published the school newspaper “Lightning” and later published his first poems in the magazine “Amauta”. He was friends with José Carlos Mariátegui, but they only discussed art and literature, since they had disagreeing political views.

In May 1927, he was arrested with Jorge Basadre Grohmann by an accusation of a forming a conspiracy against the president Augusto Leguía. He was taken as a prisoner to San Lorenzo Island, where he passed his birthday and within a month was deported to Montevideo, like Basadre. Basadre later stated that no such plot of conspiracy had ever existed.

In 1932, with Calonge y Castillo, he helped form the trio “Sudamericano”, but it quickly disintegrated after a tour in Chile.

== Career ==
In 1936, Miró wrote the waltz “Se va la Paloma” (“The Dove Goes”) which with the music of Filomeno Ormeño paid homage the traditional Procession of the Our Lady of Mount Carmel from the High Neighborhoods of Lima.

Later in Los Angeles, California, he received permission to film a movie showing the feelings of the Latin-Americans that lived in the USA on their returned native land. The movie was called “Gitanos en Hollywood” (“Gypsies in Hollywood”) and César Miró had taken the load of work upon himself as the leader. However, when he had started to work on the film, the manager that was financing the movie was discouraged from carrying it out. However, César had already written the first verses to a song for the movie, and upon his return to Lima he finished his poesy.

In 1941, Jesús Vásquez performed this song for the first time, and it was called “Todos Vuelven” (“Everybody Returns”), and as he started to sing the first verses of the song, he knew that Miró had written a glorious new page as a native song... “Todos vuelven a la tierra en que nacieron, / al embrujo incomparable de su sol, / todos vuelven al rincón donde vivieron, / donde acaso floreció más de un amor…” (“Everyone returns to the land where they were born, / to a bewitching incomparable of its sun, / everyone returns to the corner where they lived, / where perhaps more than one love had flourished…”).

His tondero “Malabrigo” had similar luck to “Todos Vuelven,” and when José María Arguedas wanted to film a movie about the lives of fishermen, he searched for an adequate port and arrived at the port of Malabrigo. This movie, however, also could not filmed, but the song had already been composed, and like with Todos vuelven, with the music of Alcides Carreño it became very popular.

For the rest of his life, César Miró worked with newspapers, radios, and televisión, showing his many outstanding qualities, and he was also the president for life of APDAYC and was an ambassador for Peru in UNESCO, a special organization with a goal to contribute to world peace and to security. He died on 8 November 1999, at the age of 92 in Lima, Peru.

== Awards ==
- National Cultural Award (Peru)

== Songs ==
- Todos Vuelven
- Malabrigo
- Se va la Paloma

== Books ==
- La Masacre de los Coroneles (The Massacre of the Colonels)
- Cielo y Tierra de Santa Rosa (Sky and Land of Santa Rosa)
- La Mariscala (The Marshall's Wife)
- Los íntimos de La Victoria (The Secrets of La Victoria)
- Ricardo Palma
- El Patriarca de las Tradiciones (The Patriarch of Traditions)
- La Ciudad del Río Hablador (The City of Río Hablador)
- Mariátegui, el tiempo y los hombres (Mariátegui, the Time and the Men)

== Family ==
Cesar Miro has had one child, by the name of Cesar Gabriell Miro Quesada. His grandson, Cesar David Miro Quesada now lives in Maui and is the father of Cesar Valentin Miro Quesada, now 17.
