= Geology of Equatorial Guinea =

The geological basement of the central and eastern regions Equatorial Guinea is composed of Precambrian rocks which form a part of the Congo craton. They include gneiss, greenstone, schist-amphibolite and granitoids. These older rocks are overlain by sedimentary rocks of Mesozoic, Neogene and Quaternary age in the west and along the coast. The islands of Pagalu and Bioko (Annobon and Fernando Poo) are of relatively recent volcanic origin, forming a part of the Cameroon Volcanic Line.

== Tectonics ==
The Meso- and Cenozoic formation of the Atlantic rifting event show pre-, syn-, and post-rift tectono sedimentary units.

== Economic geology ==
There is no significant amount of mineral extraction in Equatorial Guinea. Artisanal gold mining occurs in rivers that come from the Precambrian rocks of the Río Muni. Additional minerals mined are: diamonds, coltan, iron, bauxite, tin, and tungsten

In contrast, Equatorial Guinea is the fourth leading exporter of petroleum in Africa, which contributes significantly to the country's GDP. The country is also seventh in Africa for production of crude oil and the ninth largest producer of natural gas. The reserves are estimated at 150 Mt and 36.81 billion m^{3}, respectively. An increase of production of crude oil has had a significant positive impact on Equatorial Guinea's economy. Since Equatorial Guinea relies so heavily on crude oil, the crude oil price drops in 2009 and 2014 had a measurable effect on the economy.

== Geohazards ==
Volcanic eruptions may occur on the islands of Bioko and Pagalú. Three amalgamated strato-volcanoes exist on Bioko.
