= International rankings of Equatorial Guinea =

These are the international rankings of Equatorial Guinea.

== International rankings ==
Organization	Survey	Ranking
Institute for Economics and Peace	Global Peace Index	61 out of 144
United Nations Development Programme	Human Development Index	118 out of 182
Transparency International	Corruption Perceptions Index	168 out of 180
