= List of ecoregions in Equatorial Guinea =

The following is a list of ecoregions in Equatorial Guinea, according to the Worldwide Fund for Nature (WWF). The country's three distinct geographic regions (Río Muni on the African mainland, Bioko island, and Annobón island) are home to distinct ecoregions.

== Terrestrial ecoregions ==
=== Tropical and subtropical moist broadleaf forests ===
- Cross-Sanaga-Bioko coastal forests (Bioko)
- Atlantic Equatorial coastal forests (Río Muni)
- Mount Cameroon and Bioko montane forests (Bioko)
- São Tomé, Príncipe, and Annobón forests (Annobón)

=== Mangroves ===
- Central African mangroves (Río Muni)

== Freshwater ecoregions ==
- Central West Coastal Equatorial (Río Muni)
- Northern West Coastal Equatorial (Bioko)
- São Tomé, Príncipe, and Annobón (Annobón)

== Marine ecoregions ==
- Gulf of Guinea Central (Bioko Island, Río Muni)
- Gulf of Guinea Islands (Annobón)
