= Telecommunications in Equatorial Guinea =

Telecommunications in Equatorial Guinea include radio, television, fixed and mobile telephones, and the Internet.

== Radio and television ==
- Radio stations:
  - 1 state-owned radio station, and 1 private radio station owned by the president's eldest son; transmissions of multiple international broadcasters are accessible (2007);
  - no AM, 3 FM, and 5 shortwave stations (2001).
- Radios: 180,000 (1997).
- Television stations:
  - 1 state-owned TV station; satellite TV service is available; transmissions of multiple international broadcasters are accessible (2007);
  - 1 TV station (2001).
- Television sets: 4,000 (1997).

The state maintains direct or indirect control of all broadcast media. The government owns the only national radio and television broadcast system, RTVGE. The president's eldest son owns the only private radio station. Satellite broadcasts are widely available, including the French language Africa24 television news channel that occasionally carries opposition criticism. Foreign channels, including Radio France International (RFI) and the BBC World Service, were broadcast uncensored throughout the country.

== Telephones ==
- Calling code: +240
- International call prefix: 00
- Land lines:
  - 14,900 lines in use, 195th in the world (2012);
  - 10,000 lines in use, 204th in the world (2008).
- Mobile cellular:
  - 501,000 lines, 169th in the world (2012);
  - 346,000 lines, 165th in the world (2008).
- Telephone system: digital fixed-line network in most major urban areas and good mobile coverage; fixed-line density is about 2 per 100 persons; mobile-cellular subscribership has been increasing and in 2011 stood at about 60 percent of the population; international communications from Bata and the capital, Malabo, to African and European countries (2011).
- Satellite earth stations: 1 Intelsat (Indian Ocean) (2011).
- Communications cables: Africa Coast to Europe (ACE) submarine cable system, links countries along the west coast of Africa to each other and on to Portugal and France.

== Internet ==
- Top-level domain: .gq
- Internet users:
  - 95,649 users, 169th in the world; 13.9% of the population, 158th in the world (2012);
  - 14,400 users, 200th in the world (2009).
- Fixed broadband: 1,372 subscriptions, 174th in the world; 0.2% of population, 159th in the world (2012).
- Wireless broadband: Unknown (2012).
- Internet hosts: 7 hosts, 227th in the world (2012).
- IPv4: 3,072 addresses allocated, less than 0.05% of the world total, 4.5 addresses per 1000 people (2012).
- Internet service providers: 9 ISPs (2009).

=== Internet censorship and surveillance ===
There are no government restrictions on access to the Internet or credible reports the government monitors e-mail or Internet chat rooms without judicial oversight. Most overt criticism of the government comes from the country's community in exile, and the Internet has replaced broadcast media as the primary way opposition views were expressed and disseminated.

Although the constitution and law provide for freedom of speech and press, the law grants authorities extensive powers to restrict media activities, which the government uses to limit these rights. While criticism of government policies is allowed, individuals generally can not criticize the president, his family, other high-ranking officials, or the security forces without fear of reprisal. Libel is a criminal offense, but there were no instances of the government using these laws to suppress criticism during 2012.

The constitution and law prohibit arbitrary interference with privacy, family, home, or correspondence, but the government often does not respect these prohibitions. Search warrants are required unless the crime is in progress or for reasons of national security. Security forces enter homes without authorization and arrest alleged criminals, foreign nationals, and others, often without required judicial orders. The government reportedly attempts to impede criticism by monitoring the activities of the political opposition, journalists, and others. Journalists are subject to surveillance and practice self-censorship.

== See also ==
- Radio Nacional de Guinea Equatorial, state-owned national radio broadcaster.
- List of terrestrial fibre optic cable projects in Africa
- Media of Equatorial Guinea
- Economy of Equatorial Guinea
- Equatorial Guinea
