= Radio Nacional de Guinea Ecuatorial =

Radio station in Equatorial Guinea

- Type: Broadcast
- Country: Equatorial Guinea
- Availability: National
- Owner: Government of Equatorial Guinea

Radio Nacional de Guinea Ecuatorial is the national broadcaster of the Central African state of Equatorial Guinea. Radio Nacional de Guinea Equatorial is headquartered in the capital city, Malabo.
