= Government ministries of Equatorial Guinea =

Government ministries of Equatorial Guinea make up the portfolios of the Council of Ministers of Equatorial Guinea.

== Ministries ==
- Ministry of Agriculture and Forestry (Equatorial Guinea)
- Ministry of Commerce, Industry and Business Promotion
- Ministry of Defence (Equatorial Guinea)
- Ministry of Foreign Affairs and International Cooperation (Equatorial Guinea)
- Ministry of Justice (Equatorial Guinea)
- Ministry of Mines and Hydrocarbons
- Ministry of Social Affairs and Gender Equality
