= Equatorial Guinea–Mexico relations =

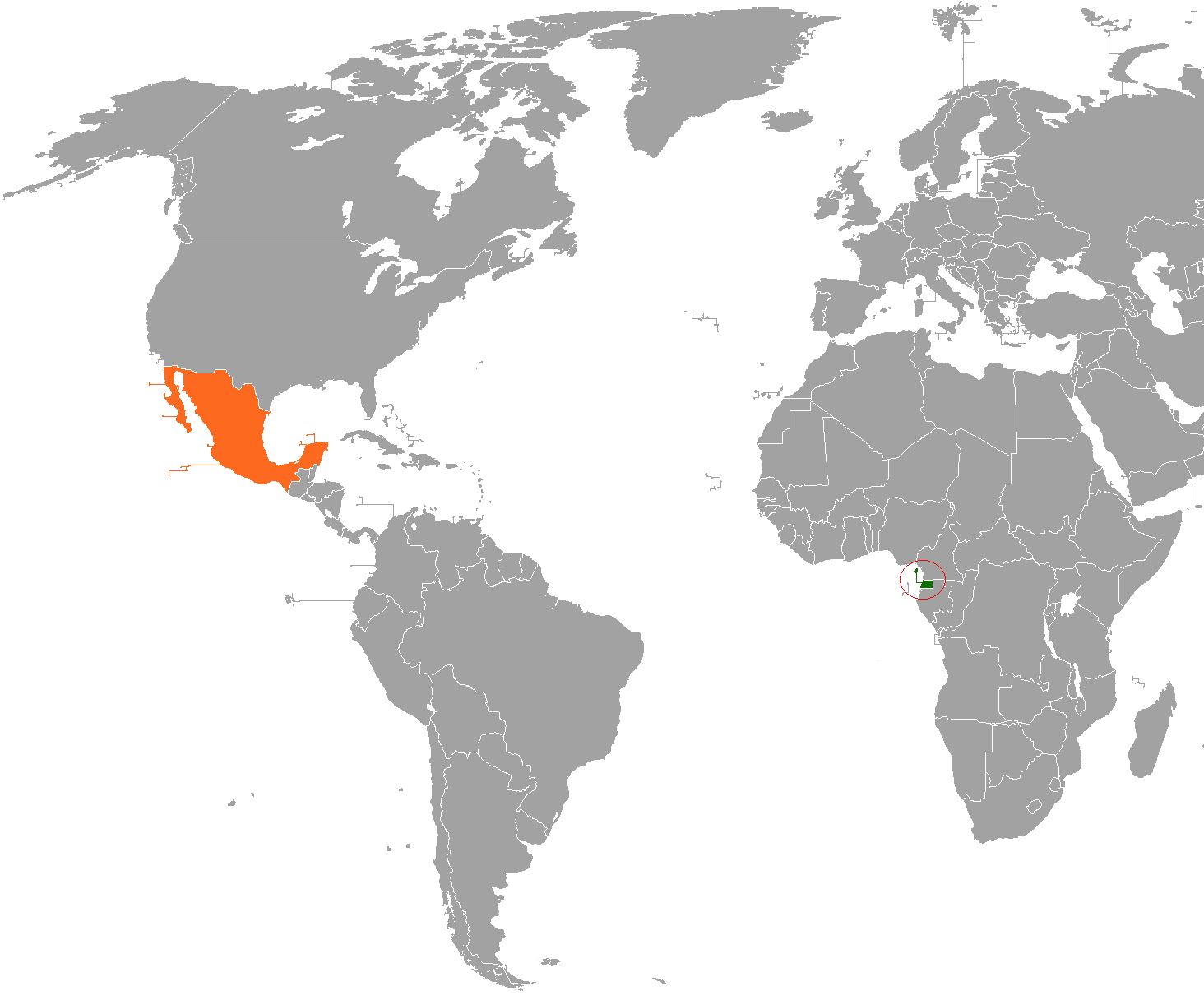

- Equatorial Guinea: Mexico

The nations of Equatorial Guinea and Mexico established diplomatic relations in 1975. Both nations are members of the Organization of Ibero-American States and the United Nations.

== History ==
Equatorial Guinea and Mexico share a common history in the fact that both nations were once colonized by Spain and part of the Spanish Empire. During the Atlantic slave trade, Spain transported many enslaved people from Equatorial Guinea to Mexico where they arrived primarily to the port city of Veracruz. On 16 September 1821, Mexico obtained independence from Spain; and on 12 October 1968, Equatorial Guinea obtained its independence from Spain as well.

On 26 September 1975, Equatorial Guinea and Mexico established diplomatic relations. Since the establishment of diplomatic relations, relations between both nations have primarily taken place at international forums such as at the United Nations. In 2005, Equatorial Guinean Foreign Minister Pastor Micha Ondó Bile paid a visit to Mexico. In May 2007, Equatorial Guinean Minister of Information, Culture and Tourism Santiago Nchama paid a visit to Mexico where he held meetings with officials of the Mexican government to explore cooperation schemes in the field of technical training in the media, culture and tourism. As a result of the visit, the negotiations for an Educational and Cultural Cooperation Agreement between both nations were relaunched.

In July 2011, Mexico participated as an observer during the 17th Ordinary African Union Summit held in the Equatorial Guinean capital of Malabo with the Chief of Mission of the Mexican Embassy in Addis Ababa, Ethiopia attending the summit. In October 2014, Equatorial Guinea submitted to the Mexican authorities for consideration a Memorandum of Understanding between the two countries in the field of poultry farming, a Framework Agreement for Cooperation and Internal Regulations of the Joint Commission for Cooperation between the two governments. There is great potential for cooperation in the educational and cultural fields because Equatorial Guinea is the only Spanish-speaking country in Africa.

In November 2015, Vice-Minister for Foreign Affairs Alfonso Nsue Mokuy paid a visit to the State of Oaxaca to visit with members of the Afro-Mexican communities in the State and to attend the Second International Colloquium on Afro-descendants. In November 2016, during the Organisation internationale de la Francophonie summit held in Antananarivo, Madagascar; a bilateral meeting took place between the delegations of Mexico and Equatorial Guinea which involved the Mexican Director General for Europe, Ambassador Francisco del Río López and Equatorial Guinean Senator Agustín Nza Nfumu.

In May 2017, Equatorial Guinean Prime Minister Francisco Pascual Obama Asue attended the Global Platform for Disaster Risk Reduction conference held in Cancún and where he met with Mexican President Enrique Peña Nieto.

In December 2018, Equatorial Guinean Foreign Minister Simeón Oyono Esono Angüe paid a visit to Mexico to attend the inauguration of President Andrés Manuel López Obrador. In March 2019, an Equatorial Guinean political refugee spoke with Mexican President López Obrador to ask for Mexico to intervene against the 40 year dictatorship in Equatorial Guinea by President Teodoro Obiang Nguema Mbasogo.

In 2023, both nations celebrated 48 years of diplomatic relations. In October 2024, Vice President Teodoro Nguema Obiang Mangue travelled to Mexico to attend the inauguration of President Claudia Sheinbaum.

== High-level visits ==
High-level visits from Equatorial Guinea to Mexico

- Minister of Foreign Affairs Pastor Micha Ondó Bile (2005)
- Minister of Information, Culture and Tourism Santiago Nchama (2007)
- Vice-Minister for Foreign Affairs Alfonso Nsue Mokuy (2015, 2016, 2018)
- Prime Minister Francisco Pascual Obama Asue (2017)
- Foreign Minister Simeón Oyono Esono Angüe (2018)
- Vice President Teodoro Nguema Obiang Mangue (2024)

== Trade ==
In 2023, trade between Equatorial Guinea and Mexico totaled US$10.7 million. Equatorial Guinea's main exports to Mexico include: petroleum and wood. Mexico's main exports to Equatorial Guinea include: tubes and pipes of steel and iron, machinery, refrigerators, transport vehicles, instruments and devices of geodesy, medicine, alcohol, chocolate, and fish.

== Diplomatic missions ==
- Equatorial Guinea is accredited to Mexico from its embassy in Washington, D.C., United States.
- Mexico is accredited to Equatorial Guinea from its embassy in Abuja, Nigeria.

== See also ==
- Foreign relations of Equatorial Guinea
- Foreign relations of Mexico
- Afro-Mexicans
- Slavery in colonial Spanish America
