= Equatorial Guinea–United States relations =

- Equatorial Guinea: United States

Equatorial Guinea–United States relations are bilateral relations between Equatorial Guinea and the United States.

== History ==
The Equatoguinean Government views the U.S. Government and American companies favorably. The United States is the largest single foreign investor in Equatorial Guinea. U.S. companies have the largest and most visible foreign presence in the country. In an effort to attract increased U.S. investment. With the increased U.S. investment presence, relations between the U.S. and the Government of Equatorial Guinea have been characterized by a positive, constructive relationship.

Equatorial Guinea maintains an embassy in Washington, D.C., and has received approval for a consulate in Houston, Texas. President Obiang has worked to cultivate the Equatorial Guinea-U.S. relationship with regular visits to the U.S. for meetings with senior government and business leaders.

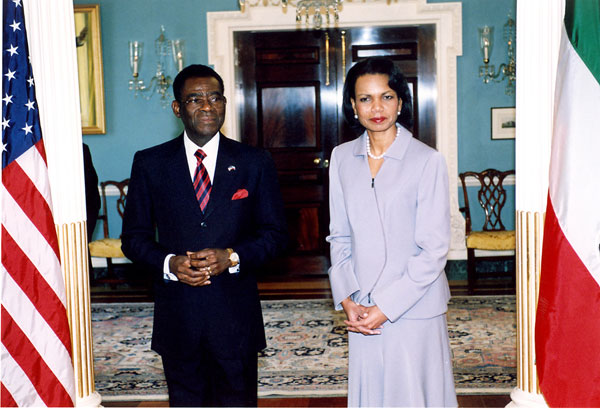
U.S. Secretary of State Condoleezza Rice with Obiang

The United States established diplomatic relations with Equatorial Guinea following the country's independence from Spain on October 12, 1968. Lyndon B. Johnson, appointed Albert W. Sherer, then Ambassador to Togo, as the first Ambassador to Equatorial Guinea on October 28, 1968. Diplomatic relations were formally initiated on November 21, 1968, when Ambassador Sherer presented his credentials to the Equatorial Guinean government and the American Embassy in Santa Isabel (current day Malabo) was officially established on August 1, 1969, with Albert N. Williams serving as Chargé d’Affaires ad interim.

Diplomatic relations were suspended on March 14, 1976, when U.S. Ambassador Herbert Spiro and a U.S. Consul were declared personae non gratae after Equatoguinean Deputy Protocol Director Santiago Nchama presented them with a letter accusing the U.S. government of engaging in subversive activities in the country and complaining about U.S. foreign and domestic policy, including the Vietnam War and U.S. nuclear weapons. A few days later, Equatorial Guinea's foreign ministry sent a telegram to the State Department announcing that the two U.S. diplomats were barred from returning to the country. Relations were normalized again on December 19, 1979, upon the credential presentation of Mabel Murphy Smythe-Haith as American Ambassador.

The U.S. Embassy in Malabo was once again established on June 11, 1981, with Joanne Thompson as the Chargé d’Affaires ad interim, only to be closed on October 31, 1995, with its functions temporarily moved to the U.S. Embassy in Yaoundé, Cameroon. In response to growing economic and political interests, particularly pertaining to energy access and security, the U.S. Government reopened the Embassy in Malabo in 2006. Donald J. Johnson became the first resident ambassador in over a decade when he presented his credentials on November 23, 2006.

The 2005 U.S. State Department Human Rights report on Equatorial Guinea cited shortcomings in basic human rights, political freedom, and labor rights. Equatorial Guinea attributes deficiencies to excessive zeal on the part of local authorities and promises better control and sensitization. U.S. Government policy involves constructive engagement with Equatorial Guinea to encourage an improvement in the human rights situation and positive use of petroleum funds directed toward the development of a working civil society. Equatoguineans visit the U.S. under programs sponsored by the U.S. Government, American oil companies, and educational institutions. The Ambassador's Self-Help Fund annually finances a number of small grassroots projects.

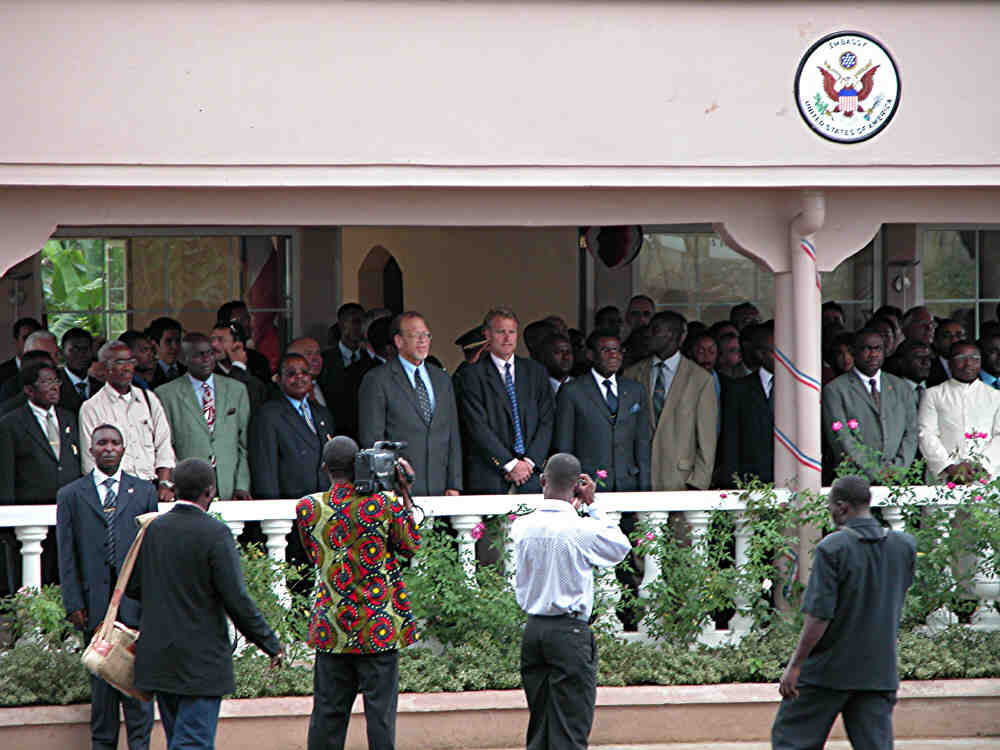
Reopening ceremony of the U.S. Embassy in Malabo (2003)

In view of growing ties between U.S. companies and Equatorial Guinea, the U.S. Government's overseas investment promotion agency, the Overseas Private Investment Corporation (OPIC), has concluded the largest agreement in Sub-Saharan Africa for a major U.S. project in Equatorial Guinea. The U.S. Agency for International Development has no Equatorial Guinea-related programs or initiatives nor is the Peace Corps present. American-based non-governmental organizations and other donor groups have very little involvement in the country.

== Resident diplomatic missions ==
- Equatorial Guinea has an embassy in Washington, D.C. and a consulate-general in Houston.
- United States has an embassy in Malabo.
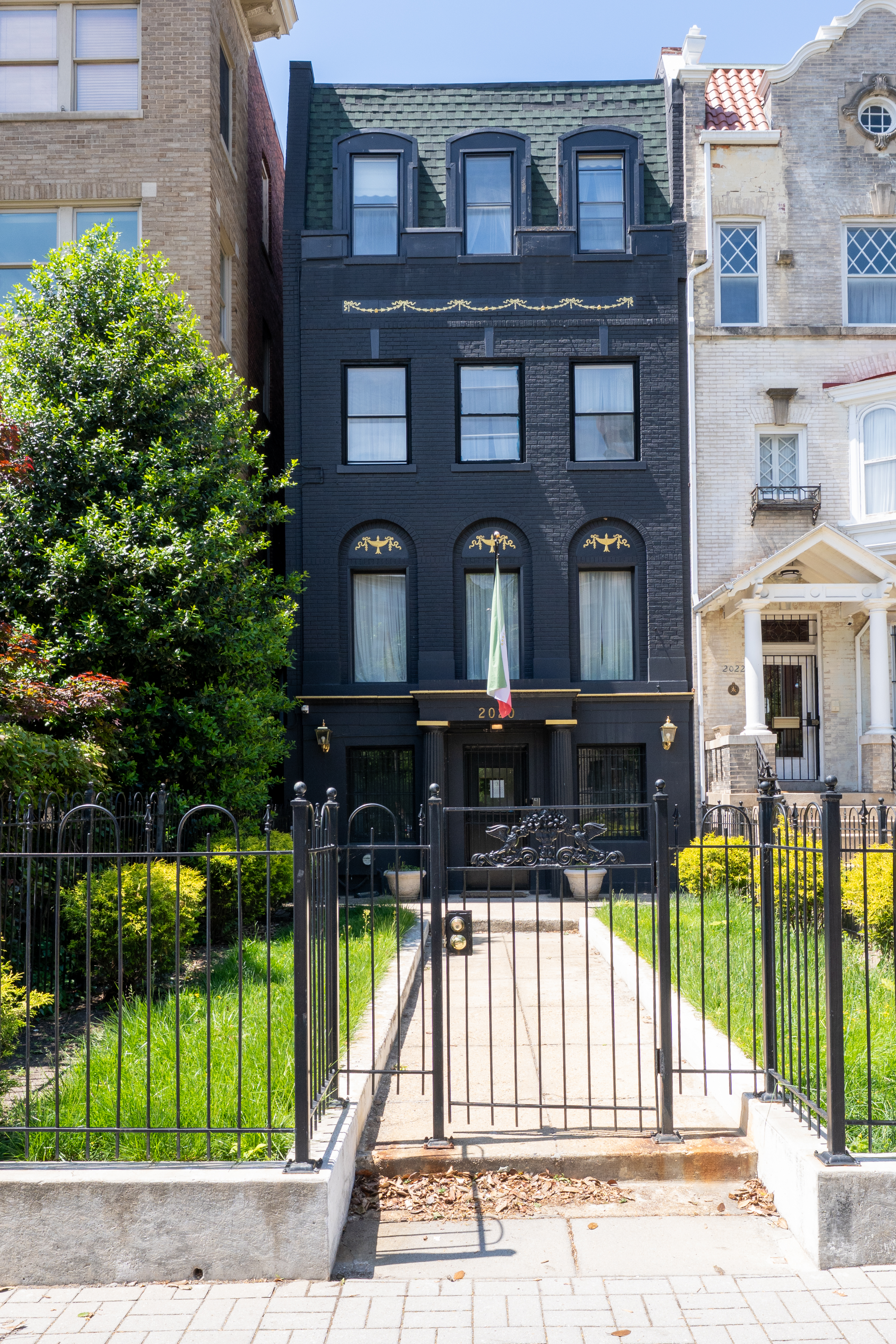
Embassy of Equatorial Guinea in Washington, D.C.

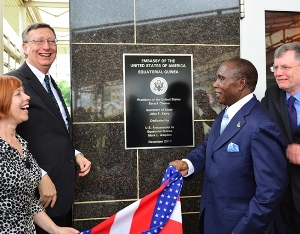
U.S. Embassy in Malabo

== See also ==
- List of ambassadors of the United States to Equatorial Guinea
- Foreign relations of the United States
- Foreign relations of Equatorial Guinea
