= Equatorial Guinea–North Korea relations =

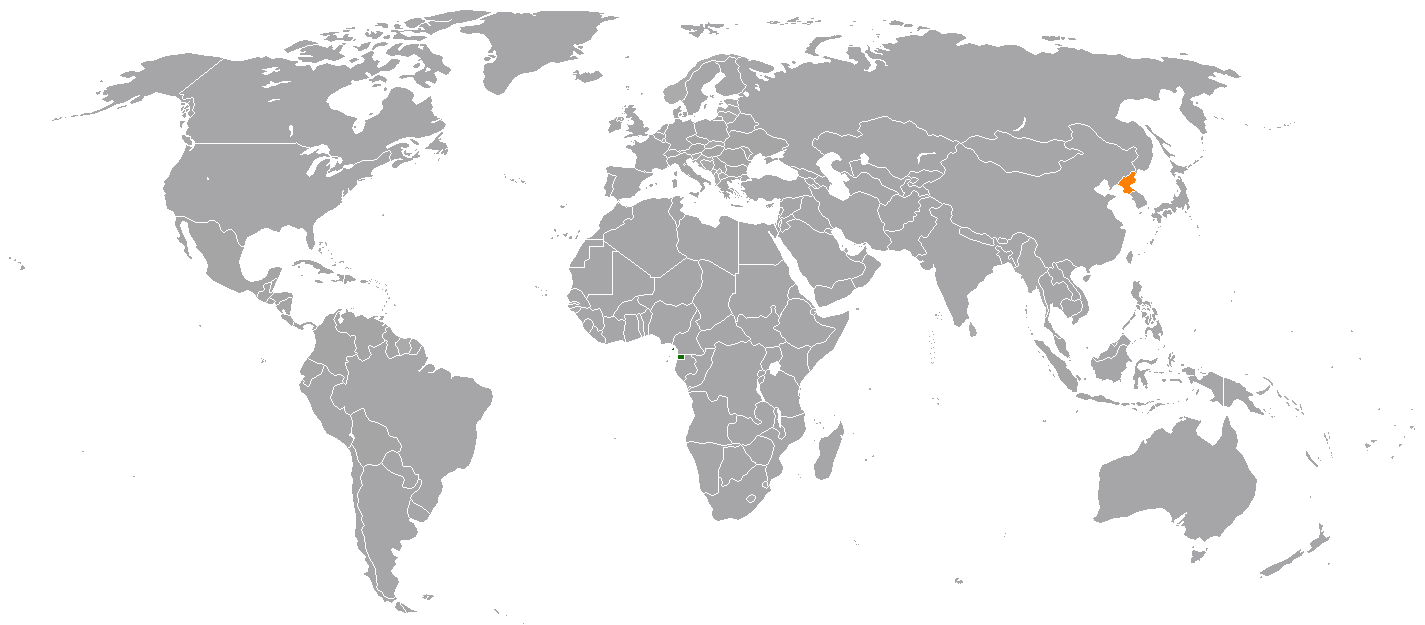

- Equatorial Guinea: North Korea

Equatorial Guinea–North Korea relations refers to the current and historical relationship between Equatorial Guinea and North Korea. While Equatorial Guinea has no representation in North Korea, it is one of few African states to have a North Korean embassy, located in the capital of Malabo.

== History ==
Diplomatic relations between the Republic of Equatorial Guinea and the Democratic People's Republic of Korea (DPRK, commonly known as North Korea) were established in 1969, a year after Equatoguinean independence from Spain. The country's first leader, soon-to-be President-for-Life Francisco Macías Nguema, would come to lead one of the most brutal regimes on the African continent. Despite his anti-communism, he maintained close relations with the Soviet Union and various pro-Soviet states, North Korea being prominent among them. Like the Zairian regime of Mobutu Sese Seko, the DPRK favoured Macías Nguema regardless of his ideological opposition to Marxism–Leninism.

During the early 1970s, Equatorial Guinea signed military, technical and economic agreements with many socialist states, among others North Korea. Troops from the Korean People's Army were also sent as advisers to the Armed Forces of Equatorial Guinea. Under inspiration from the Workers' Party of Korea, the sole legal party in the country was renamed from "United National Party" to "United National Workers' Party" in July 1971.

After Francisco Macías Nguema was overthrown and executed by his nephew Teodoro Obiang Nguema Mbasogo in 1979, his family fled to Pyongyang, where his three children were raised by the North Korean government. One of them, Mónica Macías, left the DPRK in 1994 after fifteen years. In 2013 she published her memoirs, entitled "I'm Monique, From Pyongyang".

Despite this, close relations continued after the coup, and remain active. In 2011, Yang Hyong-sop, Vice President of the Presidium of the Supreme People's Assembly, made a four-day visit to Equatorial Guinea. In 2013 President Teodoro Obiang Nguema Mbasogo, the world's second longest-ruling non-royal head of state after Paul Biya of Cameroon and one of the richest leaders in the world, was presented the first International Kim Jong-il Prize by a North Korean delegation. In 2016, Kim Yong-nam of North Korea visited Equatorial Guinea and held amicable talks with President Teodoro Obiang. In 2018, Equatorial Guinea reported that it had severed economic ties with North Korea and repatriated North Korean workers in line with United Nations sanctions. However, North Korea reported continued friendly relations. In February 2026, North Korean state media announced that Equatoguinean Minister of Foreign Affairs and International Cooperation Simeon Oyono Esono Angue had sent a "message of greeting" to North Korean Minister of Foreign Affairs Choe Son Hui to honor the 57th anniversary of the opening of diplomatic relations between the two countries.

== See also ==
- Foreign relations of Equatorial Guinea
- Foreign relations of North Korea
