= Equatorial Guinea–Israel relations =

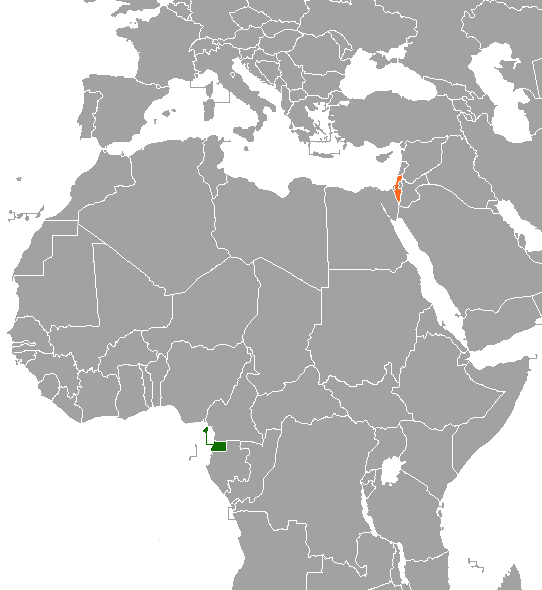
- Equatorial Guinea: Israel

Equatorial Guinea–Israel relations are the bilateral relations between Equatorial Guinea and Israel. The Israeli embassy in Yaounde, Cameroon, is accredited to Equatorial Guinea. Equatorial Guinea has a resident embassy in Israel, which opened in 2019 and located in Herzliya.

== History ==
Israel recognized Equatorial Guinea right after it declared Independence and established diplomatic relations shortly after that, in 1968. In 1973, after the Yom Kippur War, Equatorial Guinea cut off diplomatic relations with Israel, as a part of the Sub-Saharan boycott of Israel.

In January 1994, the two countries re-established their diplomatic relations. In 2007, Israel and Germany opened a hospital in the city of Bata, the hospital, "Centro Medico La Paz", is the largest in Equatorial Guinea. The hospital's crew is mostly Israeli.

On 7 August 2019, the first ambassador of Equatorial Guinea to Israel showed his credentials to the president, Reuven Rivlin.

On 19 February 2021, Equatoguinean President Teodoro Obiang Nguema Mbasogo announced that Equatorial Guinea will move its embassy to Jerusalem following talks with Israeli Prime Minister Benjamin Netanyahu.

== See also ==
- Foreign relations of Equatorial Guinea
- Foreign relations of Israel
