= Azerbaijan–Equatorial Guinea relations =

Bilateral relations

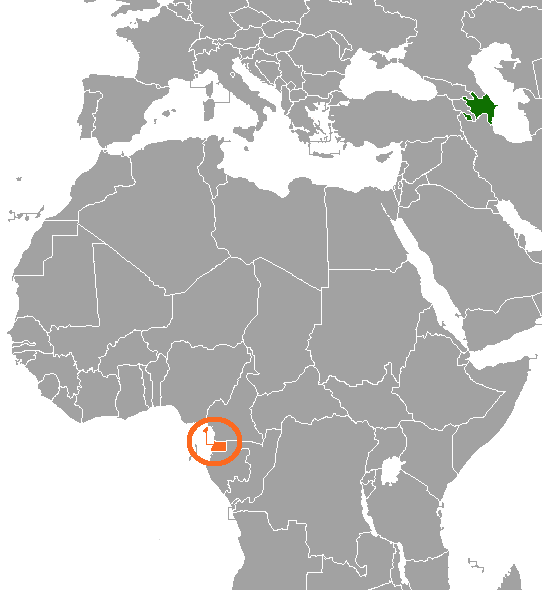

- Azerbaijan: Equatorial Guinea

Azerbaijan–Equatorial Guinea relations are the bilateral relations between Azerbaijan and Equatorial Guinea.

Cooperation between the two countries is mainly carried out in the fields of energy, investment, trade, education, etc. Neither country has a resident ambassador. Equatorial Guinea has its ambassador in Moscow accredited to Azerbaijan.

== Diplomatic relations ==
Diplomatic relations between Azerbaijan and Equatorial Guinea were first established on November 11, 2004.

In October 2019, President of Equatorial Guinea Teodoro Obiang Nguema Mbasogo paid an official visit to Azerbaijan to participate in the XVIII summit of heads of states which are members of the Non-Aligned Movement

== Economic cooperation ==
According to statistics from the UN Trade Office (COMTRADE), in 2011, the volume of export of tools, implements, and cutlery from Azerbaijan amounted to 1.21 thousand us dollars.

== International cooperation ==
In the international arena, cooperation between the countries is carried out within the framework of various international organizations: Non-Aligned Movement, Gas Exporting Countries Forum (GECF), etc.

In December 2016, Azerbaijan and Equatorial Guinea, as well as other non-OPEC countries, agreed to reduce their annual oil production

In November 2019, Azerbaijani President Ilham Aliyev was invited to Equatorial Guinea for the fifth summit of the heads of states which are members of the Gas Exporting Countries Forum.

== See also ==
- Foreign relations of Azerbaijan
- Foreign relations of Equatorial Guinea
