= Foreign relations of Equatorial Guinea =

The government's official policy is one of nonalignment. In its search for assistance to meet the goal of national reconstruction, the government of Equatorial Guinea has established diplomatic relations with numerous European and Third World countries. Having achieved independence under UN sponsorship, Equatorial Guinea feels a special kinship with that organization. It became the 126th UN member on November 12, 1968. Equatorial Guinea served as a non-permanent member on the United Nations Security Council from 2017 to 2019.

== Diplomatic relations ==
List of countries which Equatorial Guinea maintains diplomatic relations with:

#	Country	Date
1	Spain	12 October 1968
2	Cameroon	27 October 1968
3	Switzerland	4 November 1968
4	Japan	12 November 1968
5	United States	21 November 1968
6	Philippines	28 November 1968
7	Russia	7 December 1968
8	Gabon	1968
9	India	1968
10	Israel	1968
11	Nigeria	25 January 1969
12	North Korea	30 January 1969
13	Egypt	15 April 1969
14	United Kingdom	23 June 1969
15	France	10 July 1969
16	Sweden	1969
17	Hungary	18 February 1970
18	Serbia	18 May 1970
19	Czech Republic	22 July 1970
20	China	15 October 1970
21	Ethiopia	1970
22	Netherlands	22 January 1971
23	Ghana	4 June 1971
24	Republic of the Congo	12 July 1971
25	Bulgaria	15 September 1971
26	Chile	8 November 1971
27	Romania	9 March 1972
28	Vietnam	1 September 1972
29	Albania	30 November 1972
30	Cuba	27 December 1972
31	Tunisia	1972
32	Belgium	12 December 1973
33	Argentina	26 April 1974
34	Central African Republic	24 January 1975
35	Brazil	26 May 1975
36	Mexico	26 September 1975
37	Cape Verde	1975
38	Austria	1 March 1976
39	Portugal	9 May 1977
40	Guinea	1977
41	Algeria	9 November 1978
42	Poland	29 May 1979
43	South Korea	14 September 1979
44	Morocco	17 April 1980
45	Canada	20 August 1980
46	Ecuador	8 September 1980
47	Turkey	16 September 1980
48	Liberia	1980
49	Benin	10 April 1981
50	Peru	28 April 1981
51	Costa Rica	April 1981
52	Colombia	6 May 1981
53	Venezuela	7 May 1981
54	Panama	13 May 1981
55	Uruguay	7 September 1981
—	Holy See	24 December 1981
56	São Tomé and Príncipe	1981
57	Angola	1982
58	Sierra Leone	March 1983
59	Nicaragua	20 September 1984
60	Italy	8 March 1985
61	Bolivia	21 October 1987
62	Kuwait	1988
63	Pakistan	9 October 1990
64	Thailand	15 February 1991
65	Ukraine	18 May 1992
66	Armenia	19 May 1992
67	Belarus	25 May 1992
68	Turkmenistan	8 December 1992
69	Seychelles	14 April 1993
70	South Africa	5 May 1993
71	Mali	4 November 1993
72	Burkina Faso	1993
—	Sovereign Military Order of Malta	16 July 1996
73	Luxembourg	17 April 1997
74	Slovakia	7 December 1997
75	Iran	20 July 1998
76	Dominican Republic	24 November 1999
77	Libya	11 February 2001
78	Malaysia	November 2001
79	North Macedonia	9 July 2002
80	Mauritius	26 May 2004
81	Zimbabwe	2 June 2004
82	Iceland	10 September 2004
83	Azerbaijan	11 November 2004
84	Paraguay	3 November 2005
85	Guatemala	8 December 2006
86	Norway	30 March 2007
87	Croatia	18 October 2007
88	Estonia	18 December 2007
89	Cyprus	29 February 2008
90	Finland	30 April 2008
91	Haiti	24 June 2008
—	State of Palestine	11 July 2008
92	Latvia	13 November 2008
93	Lebanon	21 November 2008
94	Monaco	16 June 2009
95	Australia	23 July 2009
96	Bosnia and Herzegovina	24 February 2010
97	Slovenia	26 May 2010
98	Georgia	23 June 2010
99	Cambodia	30 June 2010
100	Rwanda	29 July 2010
101	Ivory Coast	12 August 2010
102	Germany	6 September 2010
103	Mozambique	13 July 2011
104	Namibia	3 August 2011
105	Fiji	6 October 2011
106	Saudi Arabia	12 October 2011
107	Suriname	12 January 2012
108	Burundi	23 May 2012
109	Comoros	29 August 2012
110	Mauritania	6 October 2012
111	Mongolia	20 February 2014
112	Denmark	7 November 2014
113	Timor-Leste	2014
114	Senegal	19 February 2015
115	Eswatini	19 February 2015
116	Jamaica	18 May 2015
117	South Sudan	8 October 2015
118	Indonesia	22 September 2016
119	Togo	7 October 2016
120	Sudan	19 December 2016
121	Kazakhstan	24 May 2017
122	Uganda	19 February 2018
123	Singapore	11 April 2018
124	Zambia	19 April 2018
125	Maldives	21 May 2018
126	Tajikistan	21 May 2018
127	Kyrgyzstan	7 June 2018
128	Djibouti	9 October 2018
129	Guinea-Bissau	22 November 2018
130	Liechtenstein	2018
131	Nepal	30 April 2019
132	United Arab Emirates	13 July 2019
133	Greece	13 February 2020
134	Honduras	31 July 2020
135	Qatar	7 April 2021
136	Bangladesh	7 April 2022
137	Gambia	29 May 2022
138	El Salvador	18 September 2023
139	Saint Kitts and Nevis	22 September 2023
140	Oman	1 April 2024
141	Bahrain	24 September 2024
142	Jordan	17 January 2025
143	Tanzania	28 March 2025
144	Madagascar	31 March 2026
145	Bahamas	11 July 2026
146	Botswana	19 August 2026
147	Somalia	8 October 2026
148	Chad	Unknown
149	Democratic Republic of the Congo	Unknown
150	Niger	Unknown

== Bilateral relations ==
=== Africa ===
Country	Formal relations established	Notes
Cameroon	27 October 1968	Both countries established diplomatic relations on 27 October 1968 In December 2008, Equatorial Guinea security forces killed a Cameroonian fisherman and abducted two immigrants, Cameroon closed its border in response.

=== Americas ===
Country	Formal relations established	Notes
Canada	20 August 1980	Both countries established diplomatic relations on 20 August 1980: Canada is accredited to Equatorial Guinea from its high commission in Abuja, Nigeria.; Equatorial Guinea is accredited to Canada from its Permanent Mission to the United Nations in New York City.
Mexico	26 September 1975	See Equatorial Guinea–Mexico relations Both countries established diplomatic relations on 26 September 1975: Equatorial Guinea is accredited to Mexico from its embassy in Washington, D.C., United States.; Mexico is accredited to Equatorial Guinea from its embassy in Abuja, Nigeria.
United States	21 November 1968	See Equatorial Guinea–United States relations Both countries established diplomatic relations on 21 November 1968, diplomatic relations suspension from 14 March 1976 to 19 December 1979. Embassy of Equatorial Guinea in Washington, D.C. In 1995, the United States closed its embassy, ostensibly for budget reasons, though the ambassador of the time had been accused of witchcraft, and had criticised the human rights situation. In 1996, offshore oil began flowing, and, with several US oil companies present in the country, the US reopened the embassy in October 2003. The US has sought to encourage the progress of human rights to the country by addressing its concerns directly to the government, as well as holding seminars for better police conduct and judicial conferences with US judges to improve the rule of law. The US State Department on relations between United States and Equatorial Guinea remarks:"Equatorial Guinea’s hydrocarbon riches dwarf all other economic activity; the country’s oil reserves are located mainly in the Gulf of Guinea. U.S. oil companies are one of Equatorial Guinea’s largest investors, and they have a lead role in oil and gas exploration and extraction. Equatorial Guinea’s exports to the U.S. are dominated by petroleum products. In an effort to attract increased U.S. investment, U.S. passport-holders are entitled to visa-free entry. Imports from the U.S. include machinery, iron and steel products, optic and medical instruments, and inorganic chemical and rare earth minerals. The U.S. is following closely Equatorial Guinea’s discussions with The International Monetary Fund on a possible program aiming to reduce the fiscal deficit, increase non-oil revenue, address public financial management weaknesses (while protecting social spending), and improve governance and transparency in public administration and the hydrocarbon sector.": United States has an embassy in Malabo.
Venezuela	7 May 1981	See Equatorial Guinea–Venezuela relations Both countries established diplomatic relations on 7 May 1981: Equatorial Guinea has an embassy in Caracas.; Venezuela has an embassy in Malabo.

=== Asia ===
Country	Formal relations established	Notes
China	15 October 1970	See China–Equatorial Guinea relations The People's Republic of China and the Republic of Equatorial Guinea established diplomatic relations on October 15, 1970.: China has an embassy in Malabo and a consulate-general in Bata.; Equatorial Guinea has an embassy in Beijing.
India	1968	See Equatorial Guinea–India relations
North Korea	30 January 1969	See Equatorial Guinea–North Korea relations Both countries established diplomatic relations on 30 January 1969
Turkey	16 September 1980	See Equatorial Guinea–Turkey relations Both countries established diplomatic relations on 16 September 1980: Equatorial Guinea has an embassy in Ankara.; Turkey has an embassy in Malabo.; Trade volume between the two countries was US$23.8 million in 2019 (Guinean exports/imports: 3.6/20.2 million USD).; There are direct flights from Istanbul to Malabo since 7 February 2020.

=== Europe ===
Country	Formal relations established	Notes
Germany	7 June 1969	See Equatorial Guinea–Germany relations Both countries established diplomatic relations on 7 June 1969: Equatorial Guinea has an embassy in Berlin.
Russia	7 December 1968	See Equatorial Guinea–Russia relations Both countries established diplomatic relations on 7 December 1968: Equatorial Guinea has an embassy in Moscow.
Spain	12 October 1968	See Equatorial Guinea–Spain relations Both countries established diplomatic relations on 12 October 1968: Equatorial Guinea has an embassy in Madrid and a consulate in Las Palmas.; Spain has an embassy in Malabo and a consulate-general in Bata.
United Kingdom	20 June 1969	Foreign relations of the United Kingdom The UK established diplomatic relations with the United Kingdom on 20 June 1969.: Equatorial Guinea does not maintain an embassy in the United Kingdom; the Equatoguinean government closed its embassy in London.; The United Kingdom is not accredited to Equatorial Guinea through an embassy; the UK develops relations through its high commission in Yaoundé, Cameroon.; Both countries share common membership of the Atlantic Co-operation Pact.

== See also ==
- List of diplomatic missions in Equatorial Guinea
- List of diplomatic missions of Equatorial Guinea
