= Agapito Mba Mokuy =

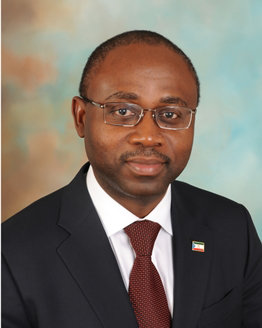
- Agapito Mba Mokuy in 2016

Minister of Foreign Affairs and International Cooperation
- In office 2012–2018
- Preceded by: Pastor Micha Ondó Bile
- Succeeded by: Simeón Oyono Esono Angue

Personal details
- Born: Agapito Mba Mokuy; 10 March 1965 (age 61) Bidjabidjan, Equatorial Guinea
- Party: Democratic Party of Equatorial Guinea
- Education: Bangkok University; Louisiana State University

Agapito Mba Mokuy (born 10 March 1965) is an Equatorial Guinean politician, a member of the Democratic Party of Equatorial Guinea (PDGE), and a former official of the United Nations Educational, Scientific and Cultural Organization (UNESCO). He served as Minister of Foreign Affairs and International Cooperation from 2012 to 2018.

== Early life ==
Agapito Mba Mokuy was born in Bidjabidjan, a city twenty kilometres from Ebebiyin, a border town in northeastern Equatorial Guinea.

== Education ==
Agapito Mba Mokuy holds a Master of Business Administration from Bangkok University in Thailand with a thesis entitled "Strategies to Improve Cocoa Production: The Case of Equatorial Guinea," a Bachelor of Science in Agricultural Economics from Louisiana State University (USA), and a dual-competency certificate in Management and Communication for Development from the Management and Development Institute in San Diego, California. A polyglot, he is fluent in Spanish, French, English, Portuguese, and Fang.

== Professional career ==
Agapito Mba Mokuy was a consultant to the United Nations Development Programme (UNDP) on economic issues in 1991 at the Malabo Representation and the head of the administration and finance department of the national electricity company of Equatorial Guinea (SEGESA).

He then worked for nearly 20 years at the United Nations Educational, Scientific and Cultural Organization (UNESCO). He began his career at the Regional Office for Education in Asia and the Pacific in Bangkok, a multi-country office according to UN terminology and the largest in the Organization, as it covers several Southeast Asian countries: Thailand, Myanmar, Laos, Singapore, Vietnam, and Cambodia. He served successively as administrator in the social sciences and humanities sector, secretary of the Commission for Administration and Finance of the Executive Board and the General Conference of UNESCO, among other positions. He rose through the ranks of the Organization.

== Political career ==
Agapito Mba Mokuy, a member of the political bureau of the Democratic Party of Equatorial Guinea (PDGE) since 2010, is an advisor to the party on international policy and a member of the monitoring committee of Kié-Ntem, his home province.

Recalled to the country in 2010, he was appointed advisor to the Head of State for African Affairs and played a very active role during Equatorial Guinea's presidency of the African Union from January 2011 to January 2012. In 2012, he replaced Pastor Micha Ondo Bile as Minister of Foreign Affairs and International Cooperation and was retained in the government team in April 2015. In this capacity, he is chairman of the organizing committee for all the major summits that Equatorial Guinea has hosted since his appointment, the most important of which are the 2014 African Union Summit of Heads of State and Government, the African, Caribbean and Pacific (ACP) Summit, the 2013 African and South American (ASA) Summit and the 2015 International Conference on Ebola Virus.

Agapito Mba Mokuy's main achievement is the validation of the UNESCO Equatorial Guinea International Prize for Research in Life Sciences on 8 March 2012, the only UNESCO prize endowed by an African country. At that time, in addition to his portfolio as Minister of Foreign Affairs, he also served as advisor to the President of the Republic, responsible for managing the UNESCO Prize for Equatorial Guinea. In the edition of Le Monde on 13 July 2012. In the month of the award ceremony, he expressed his wish that "the awards reflect the universal values upheld by this organization".

It was also under his leadership that Equatorial Guinea joined the Community of Portuguese Language Countries (CPLP) in 2014 in Dili (East Timor), after six years of stalled negotiations.

In 2016, Agapito Mba Mokuy was a candidate for the presidency of the African Union Commission.
