= Equatorial Guinea Council of Ministers =

National cabinet

Council of Ministers of the Republic of Equatorial Guinea
- Spanish: Consejo de Ministros de Guinea Equatorial; French: Conseil des ministres de Guinée équatoriale Portuguese: Conselho de Ministros da Guiné Equatorial
- Coat of arms of Equatorial Guinea

Overview
- Established: 12 October 1968; 57 years ago
- Country: Equatorial Guinea
- Appointed by: President of the Republic
- Responsible to: President of the Republic; Parliament
- Website: Official website

The Equatorial Guinean Council of Ministers or Council of Ministers of Equatorial Guinea (Spanish: Consejo de Ministros), is chaired by the President of Equatorial Guinea Teodoro Obiang Nguema, and constituted by the Vice President Teodorín Nguema Obiang, his Prime Minister Manuel Osa Nsue Nsua along with the other Ministers members of the government.

According to the constitution, the council is in charge of assisting the president with the execution of the national policy and his political and administrative duties.

== Members of the Council of Ministers ==
The current Equatoguinean Government was appointed on February 2 of 2023, and is constituted by the following members:

Cargo	Titular
President of Equatorial Guinea	Teodoro Obiang
Vice President of Equatorial Guinea	Teodoro Nguema Obiang Mangue
Prime Minister of Equatorial Guinea	Manuel Osa Nsue Nsua
First Deputy Prime Minister, Head of the Ministry of Education, University Education and Sports	Clemente Engonga Nguema Onguene
Second Deputy Prime Minister, in Charge of Relations with Parliament and Legal Affairs	Ángel Mesie Mibuy
Third Deputy Prime Minister, Head of Human Rights	Alfonso Nsue Mokuy
Minister of State to the Presidency of the Republic, in Charge of Missions	Alejandro Evuna Owono Asangono
Minister of State to the Presidency of the Government in Charge of Regional Integration	Lucas Abaga Nchama
Minister of State in Charge of National Security	Nicolás Obama Nchama
Minister of State in Charge of Foreign Security	Juan Antonio Bibang Nchuchuma
Minister Secretary General of the Presidency of the Government	Ramón Nká Ela Nchama
Minister of Foreign Affairs and International Cooperation	Simeón Oyono Esono Angüe
Minister of Justice, Worship and Penitentiary Institutions	Sergio Esono Abeso Tomo
Minister of National Defense	Victoriano Bibang Nsue Okomo
Minister of Finance and Budgets	Fortunato Ofa Mbo Nchama
Minister of Planning and Economic Diversification	Gabriel Mbega Obiang Lima
Minister of Youth and Sports	Patricio Bakale Mba
Minister of Health and Social Welfare	Mitoha Ondo’o Ayekaba
Minister of Public Works, Housing and Urban Planning	Clemente Ferreiro Villarino
Minister of Labor, Employment Promotion and Social Security	Alfredo Mitogo Mitogo Ada
Minister of Agriculture, Livestock and Rural Development	Juan José Ndong Tomo
Minister of Fisheries and Water Resources	Francisco Medina Catalán
Minister of Mines and Hydrocarbons	Antonio Oburo Ondo
Minister of Electricity and Renewable Energy	Gervasio Engonga Mba
Minister of Information, Press and Radio	Pamela Nse Eworo
Minister of Social Affairs and Gender Equality	María Consuelo Nguema Oyana
Minister of Transport, Post Office and New Information and Communication Technologies	Honorato Evita Oma
Minister of Public Service and Administrative Reform	Eucario Bakale Angue
Minister of Commerce, Industry and Business Promotion	Benjamín Bakale Nkara
Minister of Civil Aviation	Norberto-Bartolomé Mensuy Mañe Andeme
Minister of Culture, Tourism and Craft Promotion	Rufino Ndong Esono Nchama
Minister of the Interior and Local Corporations	Faustino Ndong Esono Ayang
