= List of diplomatic missions of Equatorial Guinea =

This is a list of diplomatic missions of Equatorial Guinea. Equatorial Guinea is a small Spanish-speaking West African country.

Honorary consulates and trade missions are excluded from this listing.

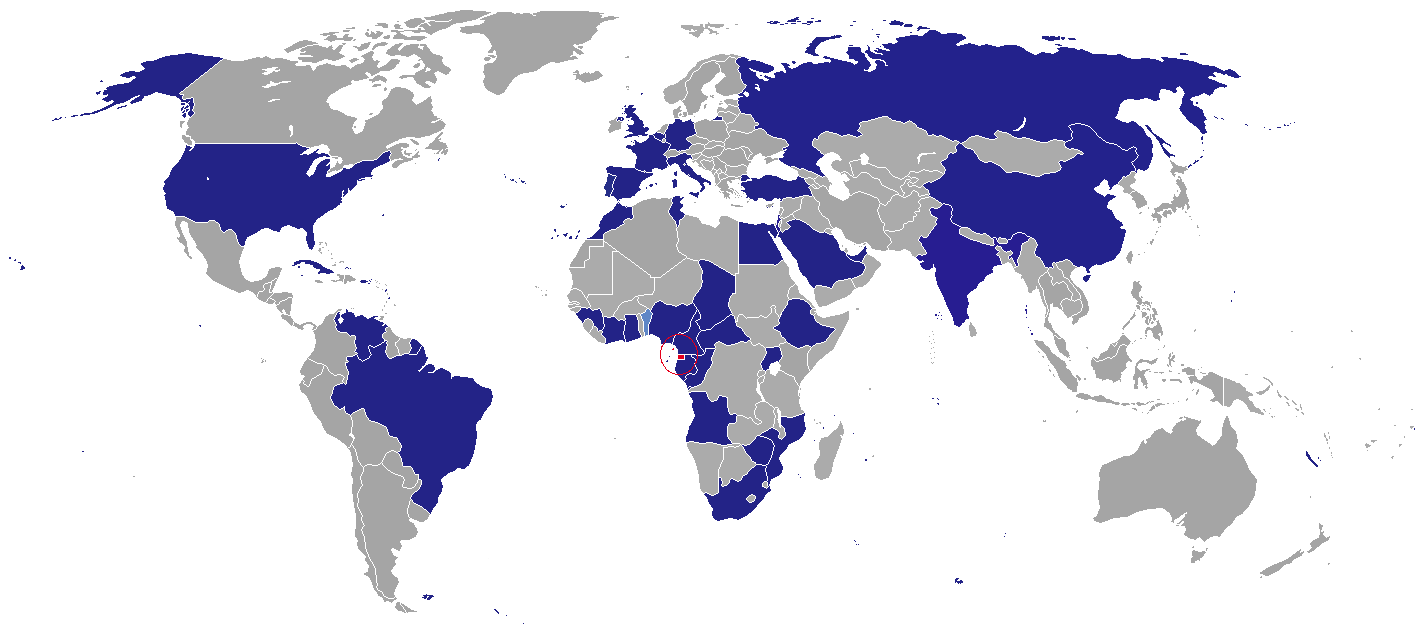
Map of diplomatic missions of Equatorial Guinea

== Africa ==
Host country	Host city	Mission	Concurrent accreditation	Ref.
Angola	Luanda	Embassy	Countries: Namibia	
Benin	Cotonou	Consulate-General (Note: Subordinate to the embassy in Abuja.)		
Cameroon	Yaoundé	Embassy	International Organizations: Central African Forest Commission	
Cameroon	Douala	Consulate-General	International Organizations: Central African Forest Commission	
Cameroon	Ebolowa	Consulate-General	International Organizations: Central African Forest Commission	
Central African Republic	Bangui	Embassy		
Chad	N'Djamena	Embassy		
Congo-Brazzaville	Brazzaville	Embassy	Countries: Burundi; Congo-Kinshasa; Rwanda	
Egypt	Cairo	Embassy	Countries: Libya; Palestine; Sudan	
Ethiopia	Addis Ababa	Embassy	Countries: Eritrea; Djibouti; Kenya; Seychelles; Somalia; South Sudan; International Organizations: African Union	
Gabon	Libreville	Embassy	International Organizations: Centre International des Civilisations Bantu; Economic Community of Central African States	
Gabon	Oyem	Consulate-General	International Organizations: Centre International des Civilisations Bantu; Economic Community of Central African States	
Ghana	Accra	Embassy	Countries: Togo	
Guinea	Conakry	Embassy	Countries: Gambia; Senegal; Sierra Leone	
Ivory Coast	Abidjan	Embassy	Countries: Burkina Faso; Liberia; Mali	
Morocco	Rabat	Embassy	Countries: Mauritania	
Morocco	Dakhla	Consulate-General	Countries: Mauritania	
Mozambique	Maputo	Embassy	Countries: Comoros; Madagascar; Malawi	
Nigeria	Abuja	Embassy	Countries: Benin; Niger; International Organizations: Economic Community of West African States	
Nigeria	Calabar	Consulate-General	Countries: Benin; Niger; International Organizations: Economic Community of West African States	
Nigeria	Lagos	Consulate-General	Countries: Benin; Niger; International Organizations: Economic Community of West African States	
São Tomé and Príncipe	São Tomé	Embassy		
South Africa	Pretoria	Embassy	Countries: Eswatini; Lesotho; Mauritius	
Tunisia	Tunis	Embassy	Countries: Algeria	
Uganda	Kampala	Embassy	Countries: Tanzania	
Zimbabwe	Harare	Embassy	Countries: Botswana; Zambia	

== Americas ==
Host country	Host city	Mission	Concurrent accreditation	Ref.
Brazil	Brasília	Embassy	Countries: Argentina; Bolivia; Chile; Ecuador; Paraguay; Peru; Uruguay	
Cuba	Havana	Embassy	Countries: Antigua and Barbuda; Bahamas; Barbados; Dominican Republic; Grenada; Haiti; Jamaica; Saint Kitts and Nevis; Saint Lucia	
United States	Washington, D.C.	Embassy	Countries: Belize; Canada; Costa Rica; El Salvador; Guatemala; Honduras; Nicaragua; Mexico; International Organizations: Organization of American States (Note: Accredited as an observer mission.)	
United States	Houston	Consulate-General	Countries: Belize; Canada; Costa Rica; El Salvador; Guatemala; Honduras; Nicaragua; Mexico; International Organizations: Organization of American States	
Venezuela	Caracas	Embassy	Countries: Colombia; Guyana; Panama; Suriname; Trinidad and Tobago	

== Asia ==
Host country	Host city	Mission	Concurrent accreditation	Ref.
China	Beijing	Embassy	Countries: Brunei; Cambodia; Fiji; Japan; Laos; Malaysia; Mongolia; North Korea; Papua New Guinea; Philippines; Samoa; Singapore; South Korea; Tonga; Thailand; Vanuatu; Vietnam	
India	New Delhi	Embassy	Countries: Australia; Bangladesh; Bhutan; Indonesia; Maldives; Myanmar; Nepal; New Zealand; Sri Lanka	
Israel	Tel Aviv	Embassy	Countries: Cyprus; Malta	
Saudi Arabia	Riyadh	Embassy	Countries: Iran; Iraq; Jordan; Kuwait; Lebanon; Oman; Qatar; Pakistan; Syria; Yemen	
Turkey	Ankara	Embassy	Countries: Albania; Bulgaria; Georgia; North Macedonia	
United Arab Emirates	Abu Dhabi	Embassy		
United Arab Emirates	Dubai	Consulate-General		

== Europe ==
Host country	Host city	Mission	Concurrent accreditation	Ref.
Belgium	Brussels	Embassy	Countries: Denmark; Luxembourg; Netherlands; International Organizations: European Union; International Court of Justice; International Maritime Organization; Organisation of African, Caribbean and Pacific States; Organisation for the Prohibition of Chemical Weapons	
France	Paris	Embassy	Countries: Monaco	
Germany	Berlin	Embassy	Countries: Austria; Czechia; Norway; Poland; Slovakia; Sweden	
Holy See (Note: The Equatoguinean Embassy to the Holy See is located outside Vatican territory in Rome.)	Rome	Embassy		
Italy	Rome	Embassy	Countries: Bosnia and Herzegovina; Croatia; Greece; Montenegro; San Marino; Serbia; Slovenia; International Organizations: Food and Agriculture Organization; International Fund for Agricultural Development; World Food Programme; Sovereign Entity: Sovereign Military Order of Malta	
Portugal	Lisbon	Embassy	Countries: Cape Verde; East Timor; Guinea-Bissau; International Organizations: CPLP	
Spain	Madrid	Embassy	Countries: Andorra; International Organizations: Organization of Ibero-American States; World Tourism Organization	
Spain	Las Palmas de Gran Canaria	Consulate-General	Countries: Andorra; International Organizations: Organization of Ibero-American States; World Tourism Organization	
Russia	Moscow	Embassy	Countries: Armenia; Azerbaijan; Belarus; Kazakhstan; Moldova; Turkmenistan; Ukraine; Uzbekistan	
United Kingdom	London	Embassy		

== Multilateral organizations ==
Organization	Host city	Host country	Mission	Concurrent accreditation	Ref.
United Nations	New York City	United States	Permanent Mission		
United Nations	Geneva	Switzerland	Permanent Mission	Countries: Switzerland	
UNESCO	Paris	France	Permanent Mission		

== Gallery ==
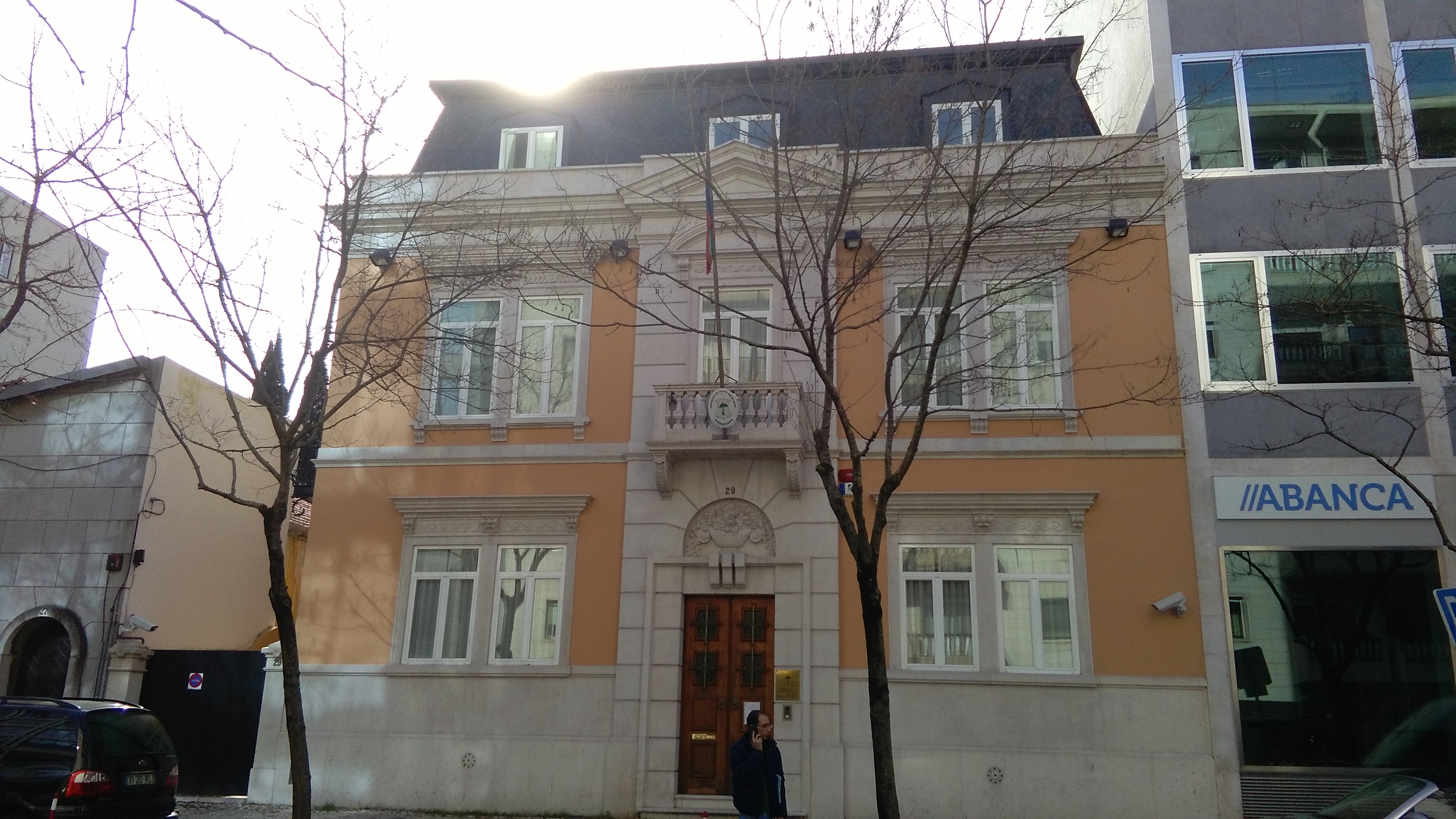
Embassy in Lisbon

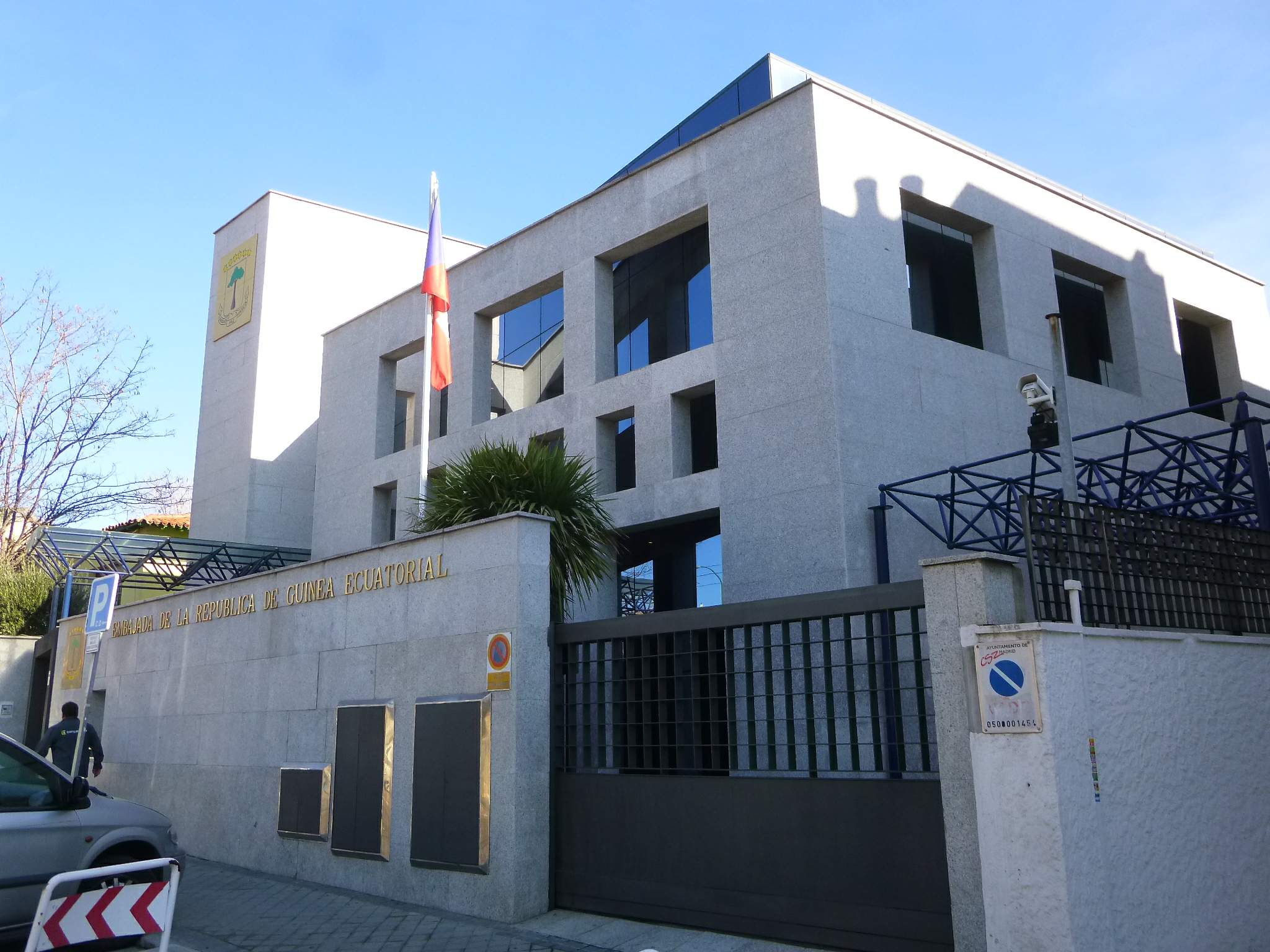
Embassy in Madrid

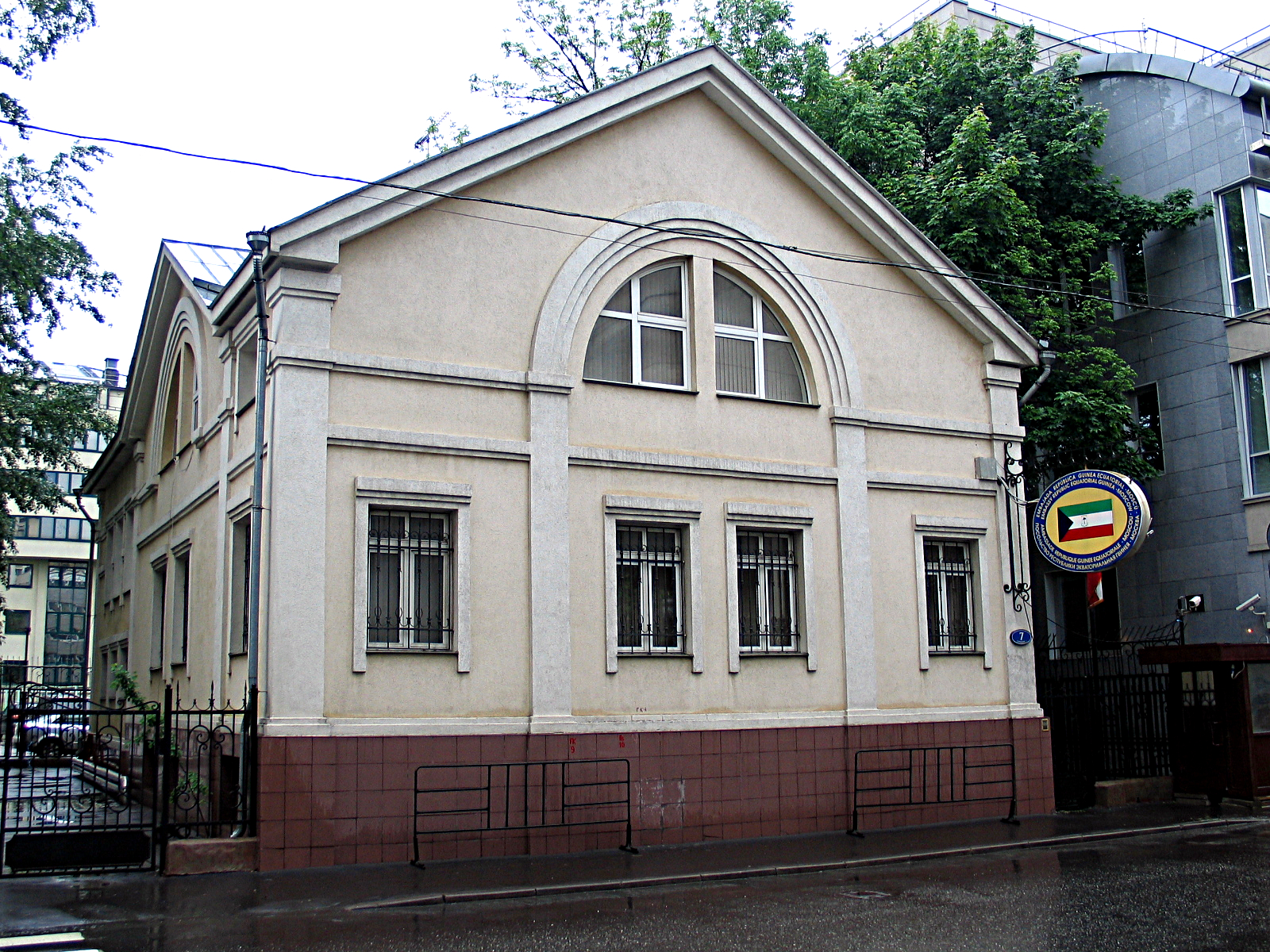
Embassy in Moscow

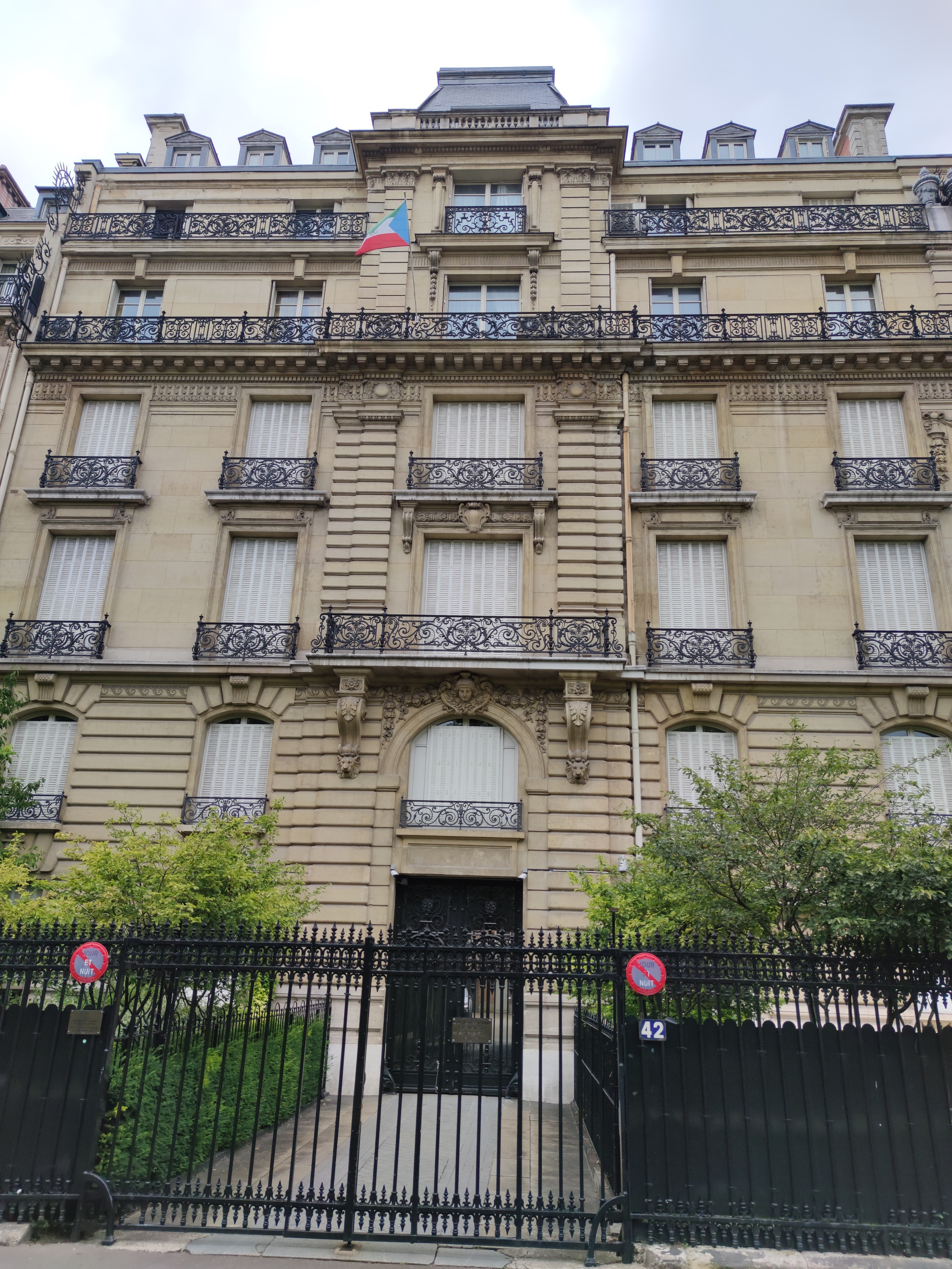
Embassy in Paris

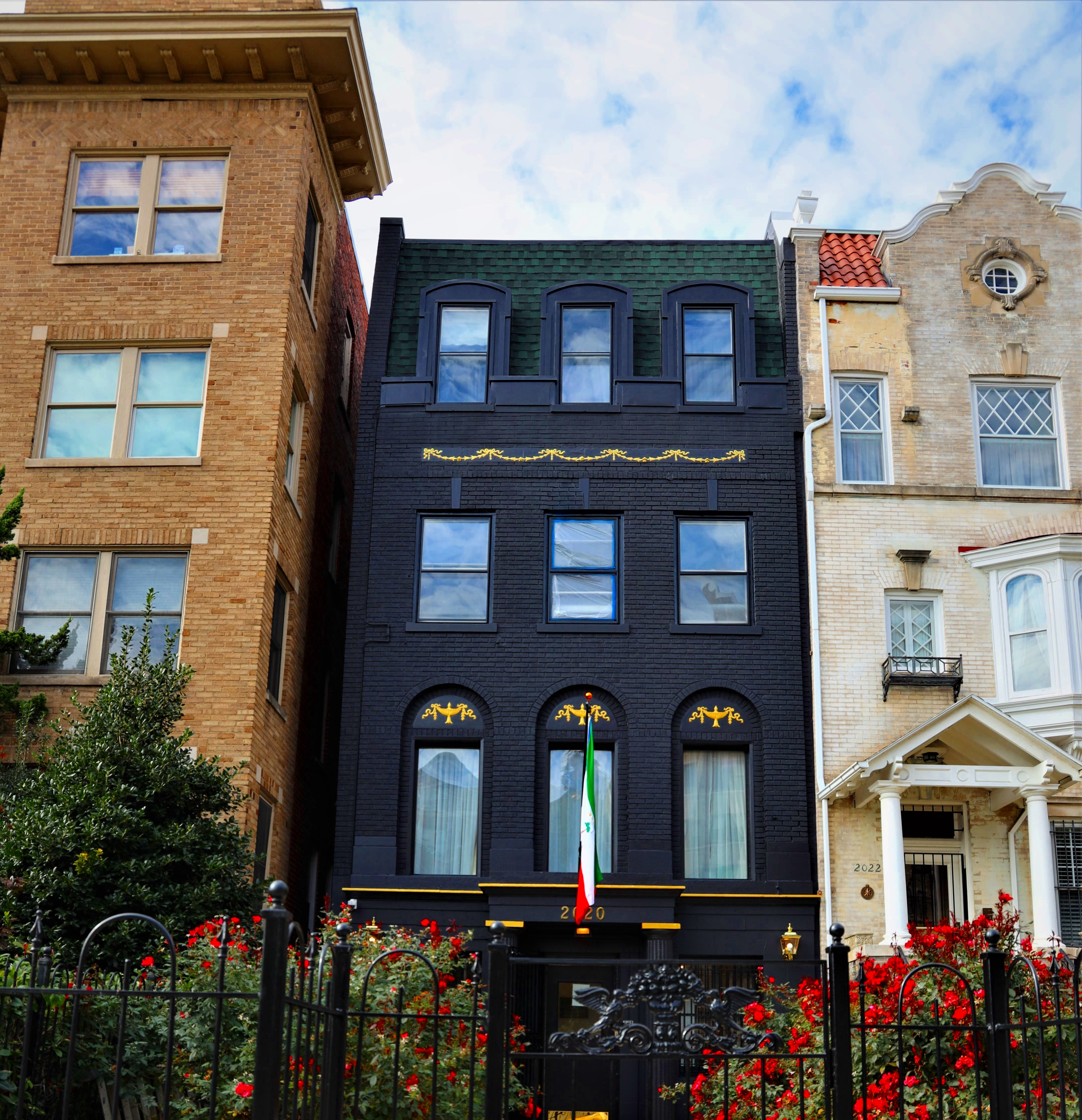
Embassy in Washington, D.C.

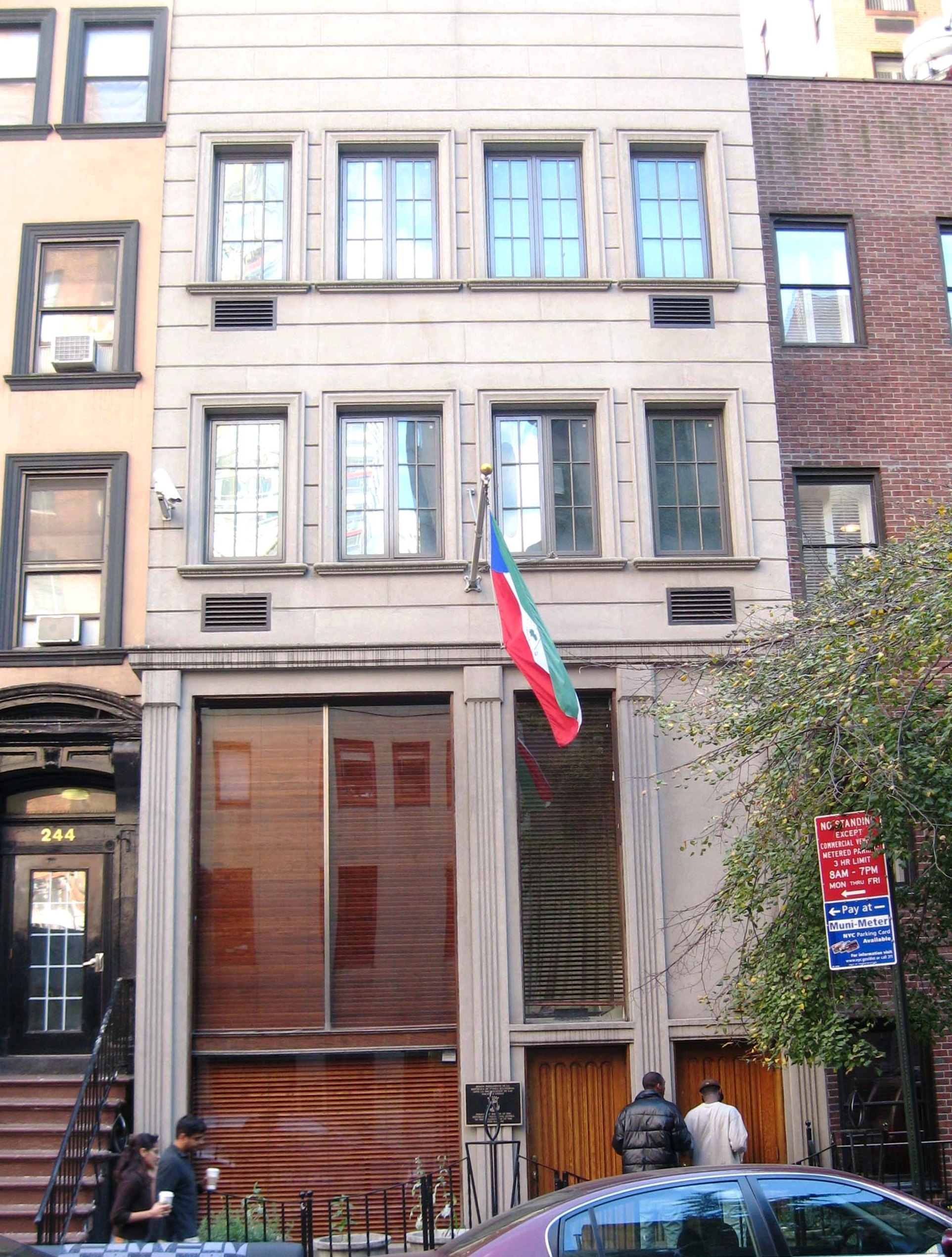
Permanent Mission to the U.N. in New York City

== See also ==
- List of diplomatic missions in Equatorial Guinea
- Foreign relations of Equatorial Guinea
- Visa policy of Equatorial Guinea
