= List of diplomatic missions in Equatorial Guinea =

This is a list of diplomatic missions in Equatorial Guinea. There are currently 31 embassies in Malabo. Honorary Consulates are not listed below:

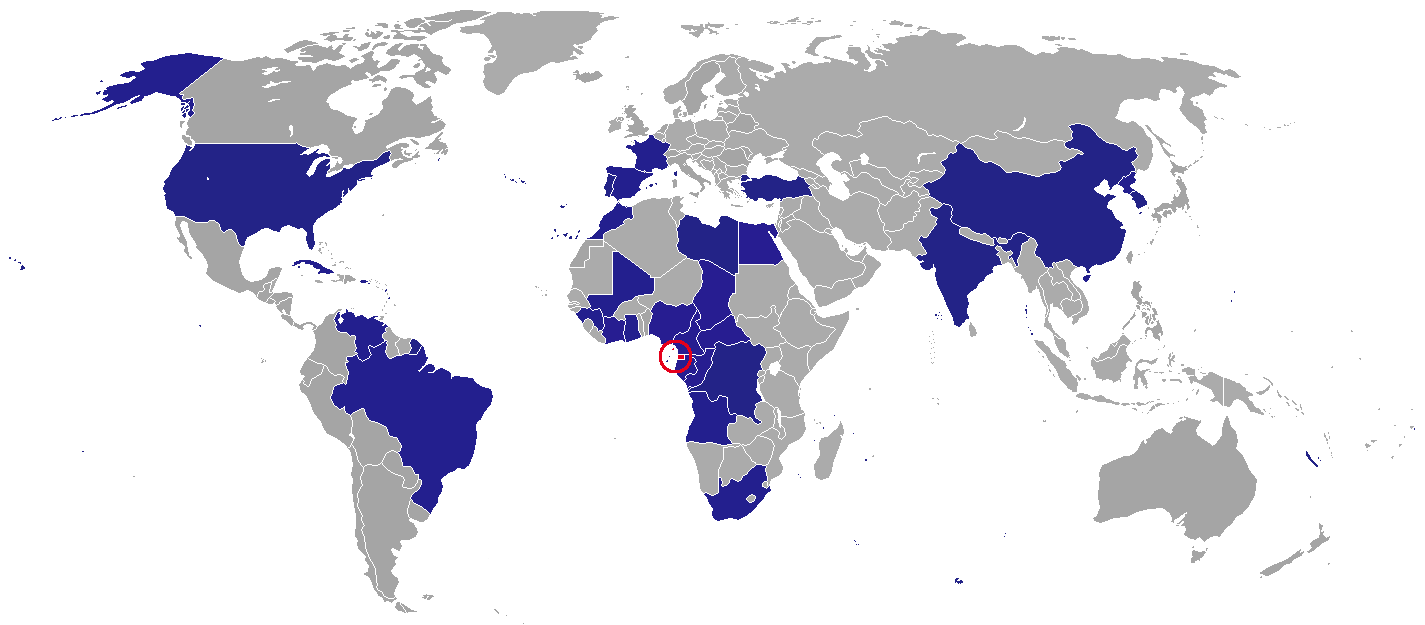
Diplomatic missions in Equatorial Guinea

== Diplomatic missions in Malabo ==
=== Embassies ===
1. Angola
2. Brazil
3. Cameroon
4. Central African Republic
5. Chad
6. China
7. Congo-Brazzaville
8. Congo-Kinshasa
9. Cuba
10. Egypt
11. France
12. Gabon
13. Ghana
14. Guinea
15. India
16. Ivory Coast
17. Libya
18. Mali
19. Morocco
20. Nigeria
21. North Korea
22. Portugal
23. Russia
24. São Tomé and Príncipe
25. South Africa
26. Sovereign Military Order of Malta
27. Spain
28. Turkey
29. United States
30. Venezuela
31. Zimbabwe

=== Embassy branch offices and other missions ===
1. South Korea
2. United Nations (Resident coordinator's office)

== Consular missions ==
=== Bata ===
1. Cameroon (Consulate)
2. Gabon (Consulate-General)
3. Nigeria (Consulate)
4. Spain (Consulate-General)

=== Malabo ===
1. Burkina Faso

=== Mongomo ===
1. Cameroon (Consulate)

== Non-resident embassies accredited to Equatorial Guinea ==
=== Resident in Abuja, Nigeria ===
- Argentina
- Austria
- Bulgaria
- Canada
- Czech Republic
- Denmark
- Ethiopia
- Greece
- Iran
- Malaysia
- Mexico
- Poland
- Romania
- Sierra Leone
- Slovakia
- South Sudan
- Philippines
- Thailand
- Uganda

=== Resident in Libreville, Gabon ===
- Algeria
- Japan
- Saudi Arabia
- Senegal
- South Korea

=== Resident in Yaoundé, Cameroon ===
- Belgium
- Germany
- Holy See
- Indonesia
- Israel
- Italy
- Russia
- Sudan
- Switzerland
- Tunisia
- United Kingdom

=== Resident in Luanda, Angola ===
- Mauritania
- Nicaragua
- Norway
- Serbia
- Vietnam

=== Resident elsewhere ===
- Australia (Madrid)
- Cape Verde (São Tomé)
- Chile (New York City)
- Colombia (Accra)
- Croatia (Paris)
- Guatemala (London)
- Lebanon (Conakry)
- Malawi (Addis Ababa)
- Netherlands (Cotonou)
- Oman (Dakar)
- Paraguay (Pretoria)
- Seychelles (Addis Ababa)
- Sweden (Kinshasa)
- Ukraine (Madrid)
- United Arab Emirates (Conakry)

== Former Embassy ==
- Belarus (Malabo; Embassy closed on 1 July 2026)

== See also ==
- Foreign relations of Equatorial Guinea
- List of diplomatic missions of Equatorial Guinea
