= Francisca Tatchouop Belobe =

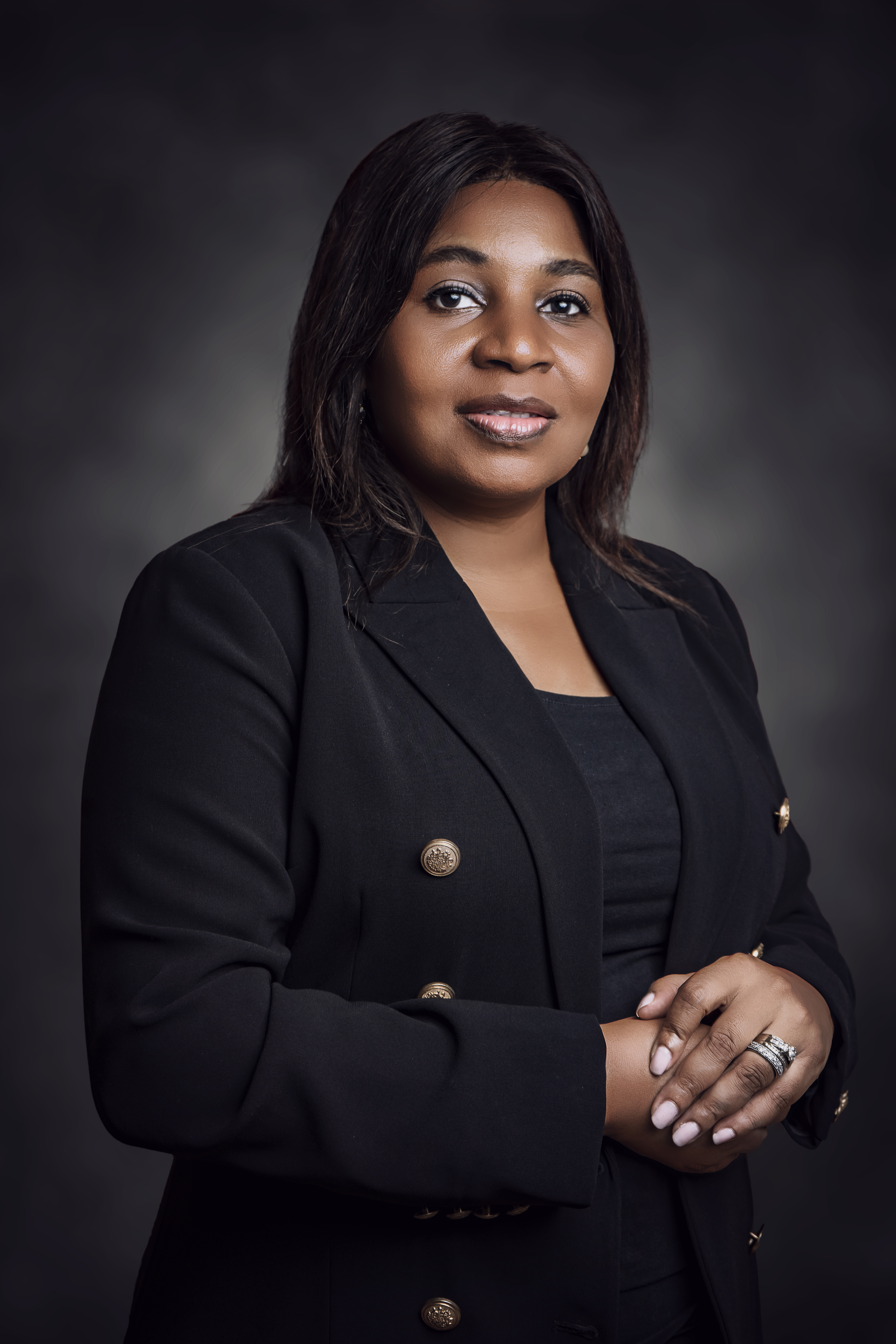
- Born: 3 December 1972 (age 53); Malabo
- Education: Wolfgang Goethe University
- Occupation: politician
- Known for: Minister of Economy, Trade and Business Promotion
- Political party: Democratic Party of Equatorial Guinea

Francisca Tatchouop Belobe or Francisca Tatchouop Belope (born 3 December 1972) is an Equatorial Guinean politician. She was the Minister of Economy, Trade and Business Promotion for Equatorial Guinea from 2009 to 2011. In 2020 she was the vice-president of the Economic Community of Central African States.

== Life ==
Belobe was born in 1972 in the former capital city of Malabo.

In 2001 she was studying Political and Economic Development at Wolfgang Goethe University in Frankfurt.

She was elected to represent the Democratic Party of Equatorial Guinea. She was deputy minister for a year before becoming the Minister of Economy, Trade and Business Promotion of Equatorial Guinea in 2009. She held that position until 2011.

In July 2013, Belobe was named Second Vice-president of the Chamber of Deputies of the Parliament of Equatorial Guinea, alongside ex-minister Santiago Nsobeya. She held that role until 2017.

On 1 September 2020, Gilberto Da Piedade Verissimo of Angola was appointed President of the Economic Community of Central African States (ECCAS)'s seven person Commission with Belobe as vice-president. Belope was the first woman to take that position. She has argued that empowering women is the key to increasing prosperity for all.
