= Equatorial Guinea–Turkey relations =

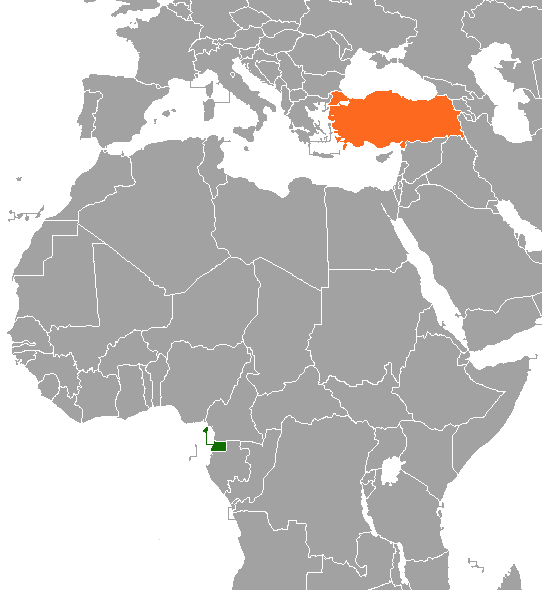
- Equatorial Guinea: Turkey

Equatorial Guinea and Turkey established diplomatic relations in 1980. Turkey has an embassy in Malabo since June 1, 2018, and the embassy of Equatorial Guinea in Ankara opened in December 2018.

== Diplomatic relations ==
Following the publication of the French involvement in the training of the militia and the political police force of Francisco Macías Nguema, Turkey — along with Western allies and condemned France’s official policy in 1994.

Since then, relations improved under President Teodoro Obiang Nguema Mbasogo.

== Presidential visits ==
Guest	Host	Place of visit	Date of visit
(Equatorial Guinea) President Obiang Mbasogo	(Turkey) President Recep Tayyip Erdoğan	First Turkey–Africa Partnership Summit, Istanbul	August 18–21, 2008
(Equatorial Guinea) President Obiang Mbasogo	(Turkey) President Recep Tayyip Erdoğan	Çankaya Köşkü, Ankara	August 18–21, 2008
(Turkey) President Recep Tayyip Erdoğan	(Equatorial Guinea) President Obiang Mbasogo	Second Turkey–Africa Partnership Summit, Malabo	November 19–21, 2014
(Equatorial Guinea) President Obiang Mbasogo	(Turkey) President Recep Tayyip Erdoğan	Presidential Compound, Ankara	August 18, 2018
(Equatorial Guinea) President Obiang Mbasogo	(Turkey) President Recep Tayyip Erdoğan	Presidential Complex, Istanbul	October 26, 2020

== Economic relations ==
- Trade volume between the two countries was US$23.8 million in 2019 (Turkish exports/imports: US$20.2/3.6 million).
- There are direct flights from Istanbul to Malabo since February 7, 2020.

== See also ==
- Foreign relations of Equatorial Guinea
- Foreign relations of Turkey
