= Ministry of Agriculture and Forestry (Equatorial Guinea) =

Government ministry of Equatorial Guinea

Agency overview
- Jurisdiction: Equatorial Guinea
- Minister responsible: Minister of Agriculture and Minister of Forestry

The Ministry of Agriculture and Forestry is the state sector organisation of Equatorial Guinea that deals with matters relating to agriculture, forestry and biosecurity.

== Responsibilities ==
The ministry is responsible for biosecurity, managing Equatorial Guinea's state forests, supporting rural communities, ensuring the humane and responsible use of animals, and helping win access to overseas markets for Equatorial Guinea products. It also works to promote sustainability in the Equatorial Guinea's rural sectors, and to manage land, water and irrigation in rural Equatorial Guinea.
