= Obiang =

Obiang is a Fang masculine name. Notable people with the name include:

- The Singlish word for "old-fashioned"
- Adolfo Obiang Biko (born 1940), author, politician and president of MONALIGE
- Gaston Engohang Obiang, a Gabonese politician
- Jean César Essone Obiang, a Gabonese politician
- Pedro Obiang, (born 1992), Equatoguinean–Spanish footballer
- Teodoro Nguema Obiang (born 1971), son of Teodoro Obiang Nguema Mbasogo, the president of Equatorial Guinea
- Teodoro Obiang Nguema Mbasogo (born 1942), the President of Equatorial Guinea, having served since 1979
- Esteban Obiang (born 1998), Equatoguinean-Spanish footballer
