= Equatorial Guinea–Russia relations =

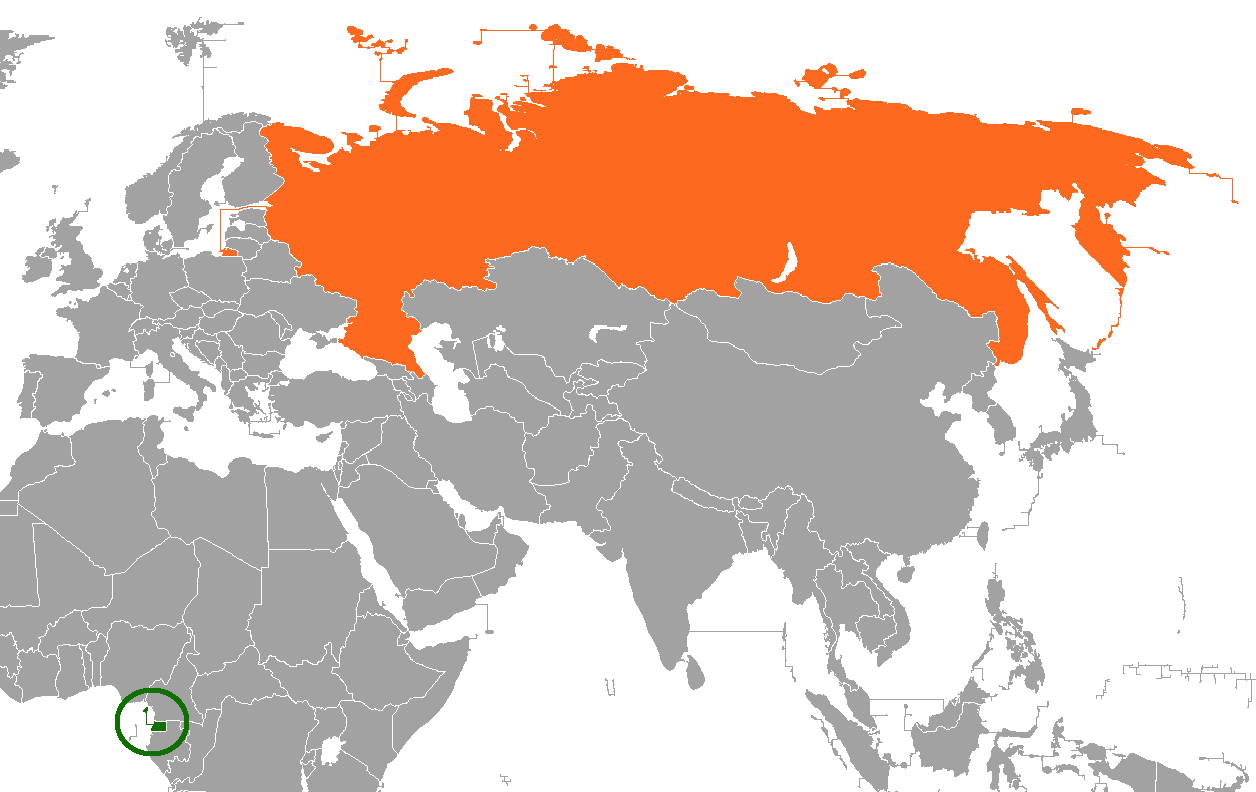
- Equatorial Guinea: Russia

Equatorial Guinea–Russia relations refer to the foreign relations between Russia and Equatorial Guinea.

== History ==
In the 1970s, the Soviet Union and Equatorial Guinea signed numerous agreements, mostly relating to fishing rights. In the 1970s, Communist countries moved in and the USSR concluded with Equatorial Guinea the notorious fishing agreement which gave them exclusive rights in the area. In return the Soviets gave Equatorial Guinea 4,000 tons of what one contemporary observed to be very inferior and even putrefying fish.

In the 1970s a surveillance base set up by the Spanish during the colonial period on top of the volcanic mountain Pico Basilé was taken over by Soviet intelligence services. From 1974 to 1978, USSR was the sole supplier of arms to Equatorial Guinea.

Gazprom has been involved in recent gas exploration.

Sometime in August, 2024, Russia sent up to 200 troops as a part of the Africa Corps to help train elite presidential guard and protect Equatorial Guinea's dictator, Teodoro Obiang Nguema Mbasogo, specifically in the cities of Malobo and Bata. Mbasogo is also believed to have given Russia some resource deals around gas and precious minerals. It's believed this sudden warming up of relations is due to a recent defeat of Russian forces in Mali.

== See also ==
- List of ambassadors of Russia to Equatorial Guinea
