= China–Equatorial Guinea relations =

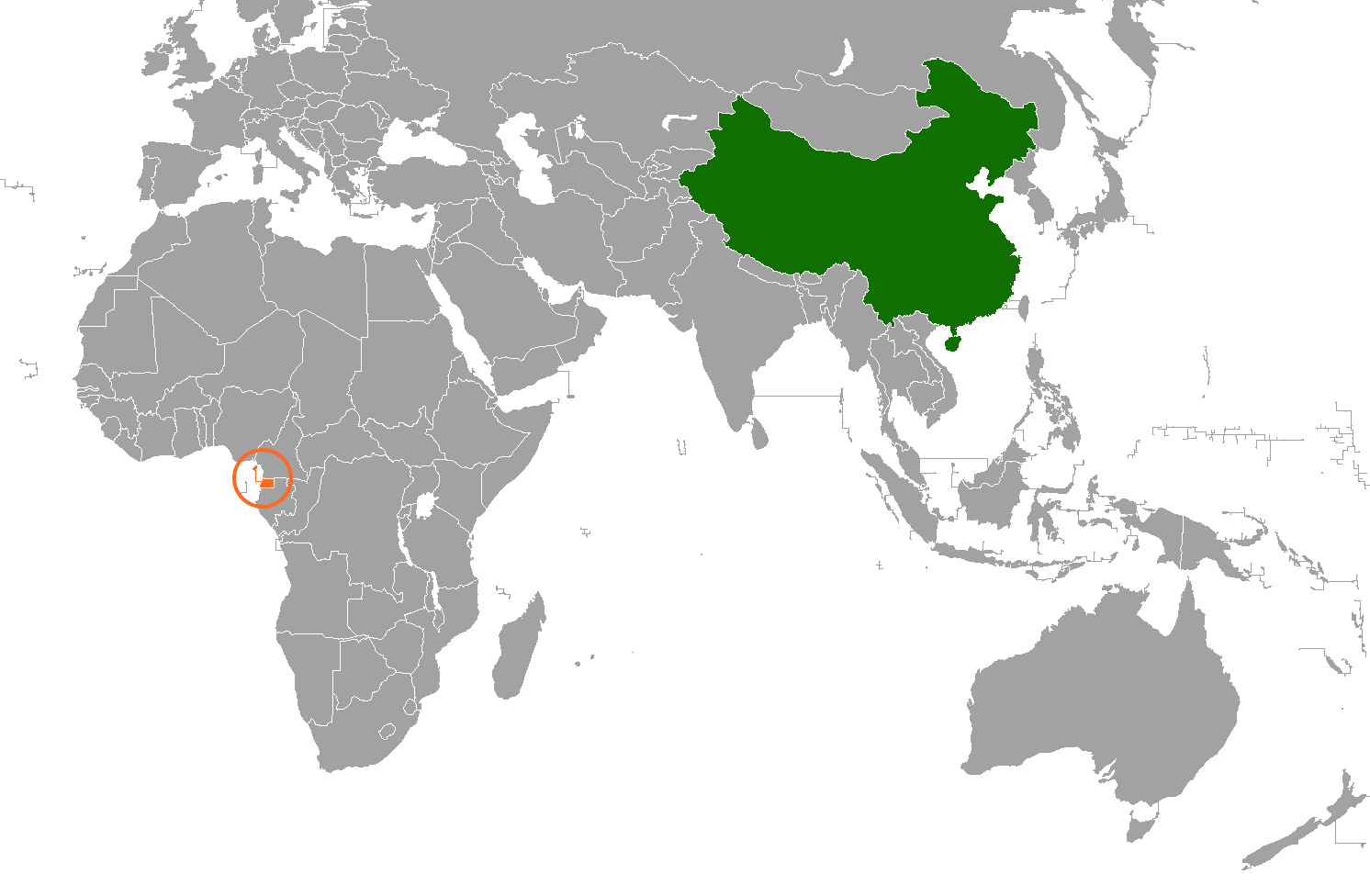
- China: Equatorial Guinea

China–Equatorial Guinea relations refer to the foreign relations between China and Equatorial Guinea. China and Equatorial Guinea established diplomatic relations on October 15, 1970. Following a coup-d’état which brought current president Teodoro Obiang Nguema Mbasogo to power, diplomatic relations were temporarily suspended and resumed again in 1985.

In the 1970s, China and Equatorial Guinea signed agreements on economic and technological cooperation and trade. China provided Equatorial Guinea in the construction of the telecommunications buildings and broadcasting station in Malabo and Bata, a paving of the Nkue – Mongomo road, that is still in good condition, the Bicomo Hydropower Station in Bata that failed due to technical issues, and renovations to the Niefang Highway and Niefang – Nkue Highway.

Between 1985 and 1996 there were no outstanding developments in relations between China and Equatorial Guinea, in fact, Equatorial Guinea underwent a period of democratisation, passing a new constitution in 1991 and holding the most democratic elections in its history in 1995. The discovery of oil in 1996 saw a reversion of the democratisation process and simultaneous gravitation towards China, with the first bilateral economic cooperation meeting held in Equatorial Guinea in 1996.

== China's increased involvement with Equatorial Guinea ==
China signalled its intention to increase its involvement in Africa in 2000, with the creation of the Forum on China-Africa Cooperation (FOCAC), which acts as a “uni-multilateral partnership platform between China and 53 African States”, including Equatorial Guinea. The Development of China's relationship with Africa through FOCAC is mirrored in its relationship with Equatorial Guinea – being broken down into three phases: trade (see Economic Relations), infrastructure projects (see Infrastructure Projects) and its “all-encompassing relationship (see Chinese Military Involvement in Equatorial Guinea).

== Chinese support for the Obiang regime ==
Equatorial Guinea has been ranked as the 8th most corrupt country by Transparency International's annual index out of 180 countries. President Obiang's 43-year rule has been marked by accusations of human rights abuses and embezzlement by him and his family. Looking at the most recent data, despite having the highest GDP per capita in Africa in 2014, 76.8% of the country's population lives in poverty due to the oligarchical nature of the corrupt regime.

Beijing offers secure political and financial support to the Obiang regime, unlike Western governments, with whom Obiang has openly expressed difficulty in having relations with due to the West's calls for “democracy, human rights and transparency”. In 2004, Britain and Spain orchestrated a failed coup d’état against the regime, whilst America has been divided in its support for Obiang, with the likes of then-Senator, Joe Biden, opposing an American military training facility being set up in Equatorial Guinea in 2006. Conversely, China has been able to support Equatorial Guinea politically as an authoritarian state that does not experience the same civil society checks as democratic states. Chinese political support for Equatorial Guinea predates the arrival of General Secretary of the Chinese Communist Party Xi Jinping in 2012, as seen in 2002 when China supported the ending of a UN Special Representative mandate examining the situation of human rights in Equatorial Guinea.

Xi has only increased China's open support of Equatorial Guinea; he has publicly thanked Obiang for Equatorial Guinea's international support for China over issues such as China's Security Law for Hong Kong, political status of Taiwan, Xinjiang re-education camps and other human rights allegations. China too supports the African country's sovereignty, upholding its “golden rule” of non-interference in others’ internal affairs. Simultaneously Obiang has been equally overt in his public support for Xi, asserting that Equatorial Guinea would continue to support the One China Policy, adhering to China's Belt and Road Initiative and Its Global Development Initiative. Equatorial Guinea follows the one China principle. It recognizes the People's Republic of China as the sole government of China and Taiwan as an integral part of China's territory, and supports all efforts by the PRC to "achieve national reunification". It also considers Hong Kong, Xinjiang and Tibet to be China's internal affairs.

== Economic relations ==
=== Trade ===
China is the largest importer of Equatoguinean goods, importing $1.01 billion worth in 2020, $913 million of that was crude oil while the second largest import was timber at $60.9 million. Equatorial Guinea imported goods worth $122 million from China in 2020. Ceramic bricks were the largest import valued at $5.68 million.

=== Chinese Investment in Equatorial Guinea ===
Concerned about American influence in the extraction of oil in Equatorial Guinea, Obiang visited China in 2005 to encourage investment in the energy industry in Equatorial Guinea. Subsequently, in 2006, deals were signed with the China National Offshore Oil Corporation and China National Petroleum Corporation granting them exploration and extraction rights; the oil produced was shared with the national Equatoguinean oil company Guinea Ecuatorial de Petróle.

In 2015, the Industrial and Commercial Bank of China (ICBC) agreed to provide a loan of $2 billion to fund infrastructure projects in the country alongside a $500 million credit line, with both intended to assist with the diversification of the Equatoguinean economy. The liberal provision of loans to Equatorial Guinea has seen the country's debt to China reach as much as 49.7% of GDP in 2021 in spite of the frequent forgiveness of debt by China. This may be seen as an example of Chinese ‘debt-trap diplomacy’, wherein the loans, and the forgiveness of such loans, are tied to continued support for China in the UN and the preferential treatment of Chinese construction firms. However, unlike other nations who have struggled with debt repayment, President Obiang claimed that debts were being repaid according to his county's capabilities.

Chinese construction projects in Equatorial Guinea have been criticised for the limited job opportunities they provide for citizens of the country. Bringing most of the labour force with them from China, Equatoguineans make up only between 5 and 15 percent of workers on projects undertaken by Chinese companies in Equatorial Guinea, in clear violation of the national law that foreign nationals do not constitute more than 10% of employees. Even when Chinese companies do hire locals, they are often criticised for providing worse working conditions than their Western counterparts, such as longer working hours, lower salaries, and no skill development. Importing most of their own materials from China for construction projects, Chinese firms impede on the local manufacturing of goods and equipment.

In 2006 Chinese construction companies obtained licences to build 10,000 houses, funded by the Equatorial Guinea's government, which were intended to be offered at subsidised prices to the ‘common people’. Though in reality, these were luxury houses that were distributed among cronies of the regime, leaving those evicted in the area with no alternative housing.

=== Vaccines ===
In 2020, during the COVID-19 pandemic, the People's Liberation Army (PLA) oversaw the provision of vaccines to the country.

In February 2021, Equatorial Guinea received a donation of 100,000 doses of the Chinese manufactured Sinopharm vaccine, becoming the first country in Africa to receive vaccine aid from China. On Feb 15, Equatorial Guinean President Teodoro Obiang Nguema Mbasogo got his first dose of a Chinese vaccine. Equatorial Guinea then subsequently bought 500,000 doses in June 2021 of the Sinopharm vaccine to continue its immunisation campaign although the price paid was never specified.

=== Infrastructure Projects ===
From 2000 to 2011, there are approximately 19 Chinese official development finance projects identified in Equatorial Guinea through various media reports. These projects range from a US$75 million debt relief in 2006, to the construction of the Djibloho (Jibu Lao) Hydropower Station Transmission line project.

In 2006, the Export-Import Bank of China agreed to finance the construction of a new Port of Bata, able to service the needs of modern-day maritime trade. The construction was completed in 2014 by the Communications Construction Company's First Harbor Engineering Company (another Chinese state-owned enterprise). Following this in April 2015, the Industrial and Commercial Bank of China signed a US$2 billion infrastructure cooperation framework agreement with the Ministry of Finance of Equatorial Guinea and the China Export and Credit Insurance Corporation in Beijing. The plan was to establish a long-term strategic partnership with the government of Equatorial Guinea to provide financial support to the country's government and Chinese-funded enterprises. In May 2015, the Export-Import Bank of China signed a memorandum with the Ministry of Finance of Equatorial Guinea to provide financial support for improving infrastructure conditions in Equatorial Guinea. This also included the construction of an urban sewage network and a sewage treatment plant in Malabo, the capital of Equatorial Guinea. The projects were financed by the Export-Import Bank. In December 2019, a delegation of China Overseas Infrastructure Development and Investment Co., Ltd. visiting Equatorial Guinea signed a cooperation agreement with the Bureau of Large Projects of the Presidency of Equatorial Guinea.

The Belt and Road Initiative has made investments into almost all of the African nations, The Republic of Equatorial Guinea is no exception. In 2019, at the Second Belt and Road Forum, the central African nation pledged adherence to the initiative. Between 2019 and 2021, China established a Special Economic Zone (SEZ) in Equatorial Guinea in an effort to improve economic circumstances and investment opportunities. As a result, a large selection of different goods were being stored and traded in this SEZ. Furthermore, they began construction of university campuses in Equatorial Guinea's two major cities, Malabo and Bata. In 2018, Huawei installed a fibre optics connection (Ceiba-2).

However, these arrangements had been under strain for some time due to Equatorial Guinea's alleged preferential treatment towards a Moroccan construction company (SOMAGEC) over the China Road and Bridge Corporation (CRBC). Claims that the chairman of SOMAGEC is a close friend of Obiang's family were causing discomfort for Chinese businesses. However, after the replacement of the finance minister in Equatorial Guinea, the establishment of the SEZ was back on track.

China has funded media infrastructure in Equatorial Guinea.

Equatorial Guinea joined the Belt and Road Initiative (BRI) in 2019. Equatorial Guinea's alignment with the BRI is considered a significant step in the 50-year relations between the two countries.

== Military relations ==
According to the SIPRI Arms Transfers Database, China is the third largest arms supplier to Equatorial-Guinea following Ukraine and Israel. In 2009, Equatorial Guinea purchased a Salamandra landing ship from China.

Equatorial Guinea is a member of the FOCAC, the primary multi-lateral coordination mechanism between China and African states. Through the FOCAC China has pledged direct military engagement with African partners for purposes such as anti-piracy operations. Between 2014 and 2019, China held two senior level meetings with the Equatorial-Guinean military. Chinese companies have also built naval barracks and accommodation for the Equatorial-Guinean military.

In 2020, during the COVID-19 pandemic, the People's Liberation Army (PLA) oversaw the provision of vaccines to the country.

=== Rumours of a Chinese Naval Base in Equatorial-Guinea ===
Rumours of China's possible ambition to build a military base in Equatorial-Guinea first surfaced in a Wall Street Journal article in December 2021, citing claims from an unnamed US intelligence official. Following this, the possibility of China establishing a military installation in the country has been widely discussed in international media. Rumours of China's military ambitions come amidst increasing infrastructure spending in the region. For example, in 2006, the Export-Import Bank of China provided funding for the construction of the deep-water commercial Port of Bata, the most likely location for a possible Chinese naval base.

Concerned with potential Chinese military expansion, the Biden administration sent Deputy National Security Advisor Johnathon Finer to Equatorial-Guinea in October 2021, reportedly to persuade the president to reject China's offer. In response, following a phone conversation between Xi Jinping and President Obiang, China's state-run news agency, Xinhua reported that “Equatorial-Guinea has always regarded China as its most important strategic partner”.

=== Implications ===
The Gulf of Guinea is a strategically important shipping route with 25% of Africa's maritime trade passing through the region. Escalating piracy in the Gulf disrupts trade; a People's Liberation Army Navy (PLAN) base in Equatorial Guinea would improve Chinese anti-piracy capabilities in West Africa, a stated goal of the FOCAC 2018 action plan. However, as China's first overseas military base with access to the Atlantic Ocean, the rumoured base could be perceived by the US as evidence of global military ambition and could contribute to a deterioration in relations between the powers. Moreover, the base would expand Chinese military infrastructure in Africa in the context of increasing BRI investment. China is involved in financing and building 61 ports in 30 African countries and many analysts believe China seeks to establish additional overseas military installations to safeguard its economic interests (See also: String of Pearls Theory).
