= Equatorial Guinea–Venezuela relations =

- Equatorial Guinea: Venezuela

Equatorial Guinea–Venezuela relations refers to international relations between Equatorial Guinea and Venezuela. In both countries the official language is Spanish and they have an important economic activity based on oil extraction.

== History ==
Both countries share historical and cultural links as they have been part of the Spanish Empire. The African slave trade from the Spanish colonies that later formed the Spanish Guinea (Elobey, Annobón and Corisco, Fernando Poo and Río Muni) to the territories of the Province of Venezuela, caused that part of the Afro-Venezuelans have an ethnic component of Equatorial Guinean origin (not quantified).

In 1967, the Austro-Czech caver, Hellmuth Straka, baptized the Caracas Cave, located in the Kié-Ntem province, in honor of the Venezuelan capital.

Diplomatic relations between Equatorial Guinea and Venezuela were established on 7 May 1981 at the level of consulates and charge d'affaires. In 2006, the Venezuelan government raised the embassy level of its diplomatic mission in Malabo, the Equatorial Guinean capital; for its part, the Government of Equatorial Guinea opened its embassy in Caracas in 2010.

In 2019, The Equatoguinean delegation to the UN Security Council, Anatolio Ndong Mba, opposed the American-led political intervention in the 2018 Venezuelan presidential election, stating that it was "the internal matter of a sovereign nation", and that "any solution must be in keeping with Venezuela’s constitution".

== Diplomatic missions ==
Venezuela is one of the only two countries in South America (along with Brazil) that maintains an embassy in Equatorial Guinea:

- Equatorial Guinea established an embassy and a consulate general in Caracas since 2010.
- Venezuela opened an embassy in Malabo since 2006.
