= Equatorial Guinea–Germany relations =

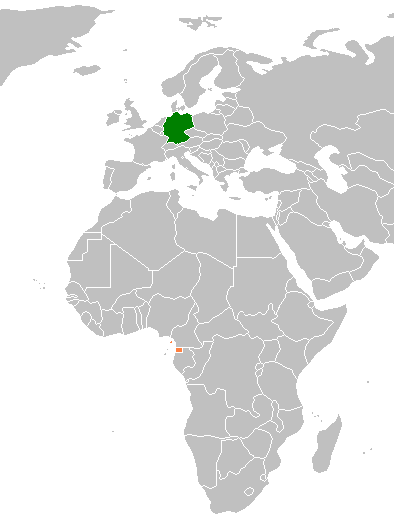

- Germany: Equatorial Guinea

Equatorial Guinea–Germany relations are the bilateral relations between Equatorial Guinea and Germany. According to the German Foreign Office, mutual relations are at a “modest level”. Equatorial Guinea opened an embassy in Berlin in 2005. Germany maintained an embassy in Malabo between 2010 and 2021. Since then, the German ambassador in Yaoundé, Cameroon has been sub-accredited in Equatorial Guinea.

== History ==
The first German trading posts in Spanish Guinea were established around 1850. From 1884, the German colony of Cameroon bordered on Spanish Guinea, and with the addition of New Cameroon in 1911, German territories surrounded the mainland part of Spanish Guinea, necessitating a certain degree of cooperation between the two colonial administrations. In 1910, the German Empire had already appointed an honorary consul for Bioko.

During World War I, 6,000 soldiers and 12,000 members of the German protection force were interned on Bioko from Cameroon. This led to the development of a lively German cultural scene in Malabo during this period. After the war, these Germans returned home, leaving behind some buildings. In the interwar period, the Alsatian doctor Albert Schweitzer visited Bioko in 1924.

Equatorial Guinea established diplomatic relations with the German Democratic Republic (GDR) in 1970. In the early 1970s, the German entrepreneur Friedrich W. Pleuger was a close associate of dictator Francisco Macías Nguema. However, after a conflict, Nguema took Pleuger's wife Irmgard hostage. She was finally allowed to leave for Germany in January 1971 in exchange for a ransom of 6 million German marks.

After only occasional contact under Nguema, relations with Germany improved under his successor, Teodoro Obiang Nguema Mbasogo.

In March 2004, the German-Israeli mercenary and arms dealer Gerhard Merz was arrested in Malabo along with 14 other mercenaries on charges of preparing a coup d'état. He died a short time later in the infamous Black Beach prison.

In 2005, Equatorial Guinea opened an embassy in Berlin. In 2010, Germany also opened an embassy in Malabo, which was closed in 2021.

== Economic relations ==
In 2024, German exports of goods to Equatorial Guinea amounted to 21 million euros and imports from the country to 137 million euros. Germany mainly imports petroleum products from Equatorial Guinea and exports machinery, boats, beverages, manufacturing equipment and motor vehicles in return. In Equatorial Guinea, some German companies are active in the construction sector. In 2008, Lufthansa established a flight connection to Malabo.

== Cultural relations ==
There are no German cultural institutes active in Equatorial Guinea, and cultural relations are mainly based on initiatives by individuals.

The Equatorial Guinean women footballer Genoveva Añonma played in Germany.
