= Ministry of Foreign Affairs and International Cooperation (Equatorial Guinea) =

Government ministry of Equatorial Guinea

Ministry of Foreign Affairs, International Cooperation, and Francophone Affairs
- Ministerio de Relaciones Exteriores, Cooperación Internacional y Francofonía

Ministry overview
- Jurisdiction: Equatorial Guinea
- Minister responsible: Simeón Oyono Esono Angüe

The Ministry of Foreign Affairs, International Cooperation, and Francophone Affairs (Spanish: Ministerio de Relaciones Exteriores, Cooperación Internacional y Francofonía) is a ministry of the Council of Ministers of Equatorial Guinea, responsible for conducting foreign relations of the country. The current minister is Simeón Oyono Esono Angüe, appointed in 2018.

== List of ministers ==
This is a list of ministers of foreign affairs and international cooperation of Equatorial Guinea:

No.	Name (Birth–Death)	Portrait	Tenure
1	Atanasio Ndongo Miyone (1928–1969)		1968–1969
2	Francisco Macías Nguema (1924–1979)		1969–1971
3	Bonifacio Nguema Esono Nchama (1936–2015) (Note: Acting to 1976.)		1971–1979
4	Florencio Mayé Elá (b. 1944)		1979–1981
5	Marcos Mba Ondo (b. 1950)		1981–1982
6	Marcelino Nguema Onguene (1946–2020)		1982–1989
7	Santiago Eneme Ovono (b. 1958)		1989–1992
8	Benjamín Mba Ekua Mikó (b. 1948)		1992–1993
9	Miguel Oyono Ndong Mifumu		1993–1999
10	Santiago Nsobeya (c. 1950–2020)		1999–2003
11	Pastor Micha Ondó Bile (b. 1952)		2003–2012
12	Agapito Mba Mokuy (b. 1965)		2012–2018
13	Simeón Oyono Esono Angüe (b. 1967)		2018–present
