= Ministry of Commerce, Industry and Business Promotion =

Government ministry of Equatorial Guinea

- Formation: October 12, 1968; 56 years ago
- Headquarters: Malabo
- Minister: Benjamín Bakale Nkara.

The Ministry of Commerce, Industry and Business Promotion of Equatorial Guinea is the country's ministry of Commerce, in charge of supporting business activity, national production of goods and services and supporting the industrial sectors of the economy.

Based in Malabo, the country's capital. The current Minister is Don Benjamín Bakale Nkara, appointed in 2023.

== History ==
The institution of the Ministry of Commerce of Equatorial Guinea has its origins in 1968, after the country's independence. On October 12, 1968, the government of Francisco Macias assumed power, which included Edmundo Bossio Dioko as vice President and First Minister of Economy of Equatorial Guinea. hasta su destitución en 1974 Julio Bonoko Eye as Vice Minister of Commerce.

After the overthrow of Macías and during the period governed by the Supreme Military Council, the Commerce portfolio passed into the hands of Salvador Elá as second vice president and responsible for Finance and Commerce.

Since then, during the regime of Teodoro Obiang Nguema, the Commerce and Industry portfolios have generally remained separate, each with the rank of Ministry, unlike the current Ministry of Commerce and Industry.
