= Pastor Micha Ondó Bile =

Equatoguinean diplomat

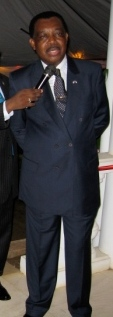
Micha in 2006

Pastor Micha Ondó Bile (born 1952 in Nsinik Sawong, Spanish Guinea) served as the Minister of Foreign Affairs and International Cooperation of Equatorial Guinea from February 2003 to 2012. Prior to this, he was Equatorial Guinea's Permanent Representative to the United Nations as well as Ambassador to the United States and Spain.

Minister Pastor earned his Bachelor and Master in Petrol Engineering in Ukraine in 1982.

A member of the Democratic Party of Equatorial Guinea (PDGE), he was appointed as Minister of Foreign Affairs, International Cooperation, and La Francophonie on February 11, 2003.
