= Santiago Nsobeya =

Equatoguinean politician (c.1950–2020)

Personal details
- Born: Santiago Nsobeya Efuman Nchama c. 1950; Nkin Esabua, Spanish Guinea
- Died: July 2020 (aged 69–70); Equatorial Guinea
- Political party: Democratic Party of Equatorial Guinea

Santiago Nsobeya Efuman Nchama (c. 1950 – July 2020) was an Equatoguinean politician with the Democratic Party of Equatorial Guinea.

Between 1999 and 2003, he was Minister of Foreign Affairs, in which capacity he negotiated a marine borders agreement with Dubern Onya of Nigeria, which aimed to resolve disputes over offshore oil drilling. In April 2007, by which time he had become Information, Culture and Tourism Minister, he visited Zimbabwe and met with President Robert Mugabe regarding strengthening political and economic relations between the two countries.

In July 2013, Nsobeya was named Second Vice-President of the Chamber of Deputies of the Parliament of Equatorial Guinea, alongside Francisca Tatchouop Belobe. In January 2014, he was chosen as one of 24 Special Advisers of the Secretary-General of the Democratic Party of Equatorial Guinea. From March 2014 until his death he was the First Vice-President of the Chamber of Deputies.

Nsobeya's death was reported on 8 July 2020, aged 70.
