= Simeón Oyono Esono Angüe =

Equatoguinean politician (born 1967)

Simeón Oyono
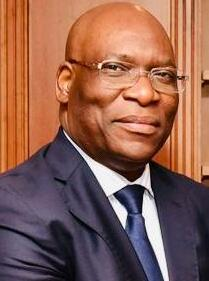
- Oyono in 2019

Minister of Foreign Affairs and International Cooperation
- Incumbent
- Assumed office 2018
- Preceded by: Agapito Mba Mokuy

Personal details
- Born: Simeón Oyono Esono Angüe; 18 February 1967 (age 59) Mibang Esawong, Spanish Guinea
- Party: Democratic Party of Equatorial Guinea

Simeón Oyono Esono Angüe (born 18 February 1967) is an Equatorial Guinean politician who has been Minister of Foreign Affairs and International Cooperation since 2018.
