= Christianity in Equatorial Guinea =

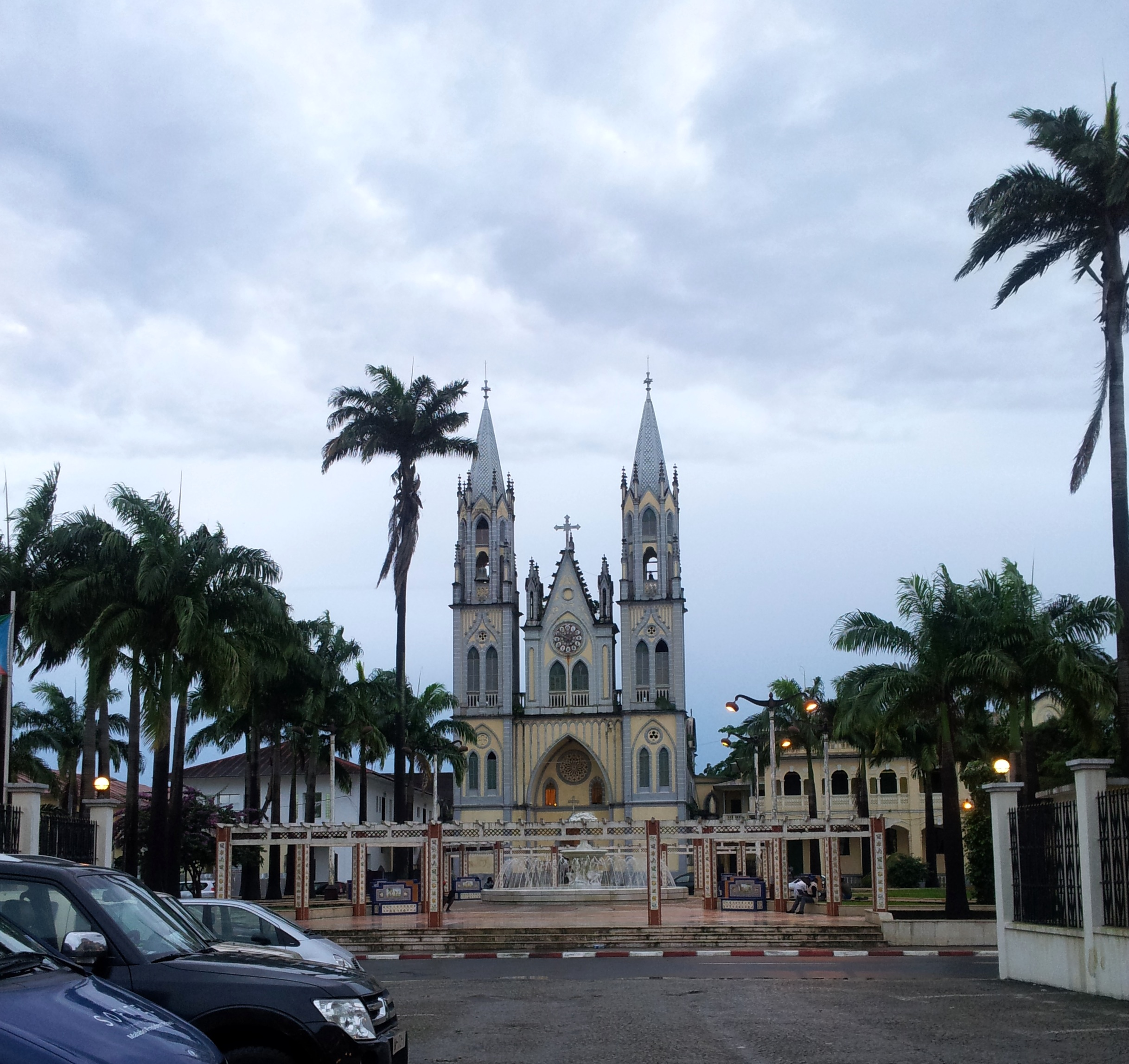
Cathedral Santa Isabel in Malabo

Christianity in Equatorial Guinea dates back to pre-independence, when Equatorial Guinea was a colony of Portugal and Spain. In 2023 almost 90% of the population are Christian. Of these 71% are Roman Catholics, though there are also a few thousand Protestants, mainly from the Reformed Church, but also Methodists and Presbyterians.

== History of Christianity in Equatorial Guinea ==
Originally home to religious traditions of indigenous Bubi and Fang tribes, Equatorial Guinea's relationship with Roman Catholicism first began through its colonization by the Portuguese in the late 15th century (specifically in the year 1472). Having little development over the territory, Portugal's religious influence was interrupted by multiple Baptist missions by the British in 1827 and 1839. Focused on the island of Fernando Po, British Christianization efforts were cut short in this time due to Spanish interest in the territory. Resultantly, the former Portuguese colony was ceded to Spain in 1778. From the mid-nineteenth-century there were various Protestant missions, such as Baptist missions from the West Indies (in 1841), Primitive Methodists from England, and Presbyterians (in 1850) from the United States. However, one of the most widely known British Baptist missionaries, Alfred Saker, took a special interest in Christianizing the island of Fernando Po. Gaining trust from the indigenous communities, Saker lived among them and created many protestant churches beginning in 1849. Despite his connection with the people, Alfred Saker, and other protestant missionaries, were expelled by the Spanish government in 1853 due to a concordat between Spain and the Vatican. This concordat declared Catholicism to be the colony's official religion and led to some expulsion or non-recognition of competing faiths. Presbyterians were not recognised until 1906, and Protestant schools were not allowed under the Spanish rule. All Protestant churches were closed in 1952. During Equatorial Guinea's decolonization movement, Spain loosened its hold on restrictions. As a result, some religious freedoms and equal rights were granted to native citizens in 1959.

After independence on October 12, 1962, there were brief hopes for complete religious freedom. However, there was severe persecution of Christians (associated with colonialist history) under the rule of Macías Nguema, president from 1968 to 1979, who wanted to be recognised as messiah. Nguema ordered his own photograph to be hung by the altar at every church, stating, "God created Equatorial Guinea, thanks to Papa Macías" and "There is no other God other than Macías Nguema". Additionally, in 1975, Macías Nguema ordered all churches to close, and the Roman Catholic Church was officially banned in 1978. As a result of these religious persecutions and limitations, tens of thousands of Christians fled the country to Gabon or Cameroon.

After Nguema's overthrow, efforts were made to re-establish the Roman Catholic church in Equatorial Guinea. A papal visit in February 1982 was followed later that year by the establishment of the country as a Roman Catholic province with its own archdiocese of Malabo, and the dioceses of Bata and Ebebiyin. However, there are few national priests, and most pastoral work is carried out by Spanish priests, monks and nuns. The high numbers of Equatorial Guineans with a Christian background is likely due to the early colonial influence of Spain as well as its continued ties with Spanish traditions.

== Freedom of Religion ==
In 2022, Equatorial Guinea scored 1 out of 4 in religious freedom.

== See also ==
- Religion in Equatorial Guinea
- Catholic Church in Equatorial Guinea
- Protestantism in Equatorial Guinea
- Reformed Presbyterian Church of Equatorial Guinea
- Episcopal Conference of Equatorial Guinea
