= Miguel Angel Nguema Bee =

Equatorial Guinean Catholic prelate (born 1969)

The Most Reverend Miguel Angel Nguema Bee
- Bishop of Bata; Equatorial Guinea
- Church: Catholic Church
- Archdiocese: Roman Catholic Archdiocese of Malabo
- See: Diocese of Bata
- Appointed: 14 May 2026
- Installed: 14 May 2026
- Predecessor: Juan Matogo Oyana (11 May 2002 - 10 December 2024)
- Successor: Incumbent
- Previous posts: Bishop of Ebebiyin (1 April 2017 - 14 May 2026); Apostolic Administrator of Bata (10 December 2024 - 14 May 2026)

Orders
- Ordination: 24 July 2000
- Consecration: 20 May 2017 by Fernando Cardinal Filoni

Personal details
- Born: Miguel Angel Nguema Bee; 13 July 1969 (age 57) Bata, Diocese of Bata, Equatorial Guinea
- Motto: "Ecce Agnus Dei" (Behold the Lamb of God)

Styles of Miguel Angel Nguema Bee
- Reference style: His Grace; The Most Reverend
- Spoken style: Your Grace
- Religious style: Bishop

Miguel Angel Nguema Bee Etete S.D.B. (born 13 July 1969) is an Equatorial Guinean Catholic prelate who serves as the Bishop]of the Roman Catholic Diocese of Bata, Equatorial Guinea since 14 May 2026. Before that, from 1 April 2017 until 14 May 2026, he served as the bishop of the Roman Catholic Diocese of Ebebiyin, in Equatorial Guinea. He was appointed bishop by Pope Francis. His episcopal consecration took place at Mongomo on 20 May 2017 by the hands of Cardinal Fernando Filoni. He was installed at Ebebiyin on 24 May 2017. While local ordinary at Ebebiyin, he served as Apostolic Administrator at Bata from 10 December 2024 until 14 May 2026. Pope Leo XIV appointed him local ordinary of the diocese of Bata on 14 May 2026 He is a professed member of the Order of the Salesians of Saint John Bosco.

== Background and education ==
He was born on 13 July 1969, in Bata, Equatorial Guinea. He studied Philosophy at the Don Bosco Institute of Philosophy and Human Sciences in Lomé, Togo. He then studied Theology at the Theologicum Saint François de Sales in Lubumbashi, Democratic Republic of the Congo. Later, he graduated with a Licentiate in Education sciences from the Pontifical Salesian University in Rome, Italy.

== Priest ==
He took is solemn vows as a member of the Catholic Religious Order of the Salesians of Saint John Bosco on 19 July 1998. He was ordained a priest on 24 July 2000 for the same religious order. He served as a priest until 1 April 2017. While a priest, he served in various roles and locations, including within Salesian communities in Cameroon and Congo. He also studied at the Pontifical Salesian University, in Rome Italy.

== Bishop ==
1 April 2017, Pope Francis appointed hin bishop of the catholic Diocese of Ebebiyin, Equatorial Guinea. He was consecrated at Mongomo, Diocese of Mongomo, in Equatorial Guinea on 20 May 2017. The Principal Consecrator was Cardinal Fernando Filoni, Cardinal-Deacon of Nostra Signora di Coromoto in San Giovanni di Dio who was assisted by Juan Nsue Edjang Mayé, Archbishop of Malabo and Juan Matogo Oyana, Bishop of Bata. On 14 May 2026, Pope Leo XIV transferred Bishop Miguel Angel Nguema Bee, S.D.B., from the Diocese of Ebebiyin and appointed him local ordinary at the Diocese of Bata..

He has served as vice-president of the Episcopal Conference of Equatorial Guinea (CEGE), since 2017.

== See also ==
- Roman Catholicism in Equatorial Guinea

== Succession table ==
Catholic Church titles
Preceded by Juan Matogo Oyana (11 May 2002 - 10 December 2024)	Bishop of Bata (since 14 May 2026)	Succeeded by (Incumbent)
Preceded by	Apostolic Administrator of Bata (10 December 2024 - 14 May 2026)	Succeeded by
Preceded by Juan Nsue Edjang Mayé (19 February 2011 - 11 February 2015)	Bishop of Ebebiyin (1 April 2017 - 14 May 2026)	Succeeded by (Vacant)
