= Reformed Presbyterian Church of Equatorial Guinea =

Protestant church in Equatorial Guinea

The Reformed Presbyterian Church of Equatorial Guinea (in Spanish Iglesia Reformada Presbiteriana de Guinea Ecuatorial, IRPGE) is a minority church in Equatorial Guinea. It is reformed by its theology and presbyterian by its form of government, as stated in its constitution. The principal religion in Equatorial Guinea is Christianity, with approximately 85-93% of the population as followers. Most Christians belong to the Roman Catholic Church (80-87%) while a minority are Protestants (5-7%). Another 5% of the population follow indigenous beliefs, 2% are Muslims, followers of Baha'i and other beliefs.

== History ==
=== Origins ===
A group of missionaries from the Presbyterian Church in the USA (Synod of New Jersey) settled on the island of Corisco in the Gulf of Guinea in 1850. From there they moved to the mainland where they founded the first congregation in Bolondo (now Mbini). They spread into the interior of the continent setting up more congregations as well as schools and clinics, as they had in the coastal area. In 1900, France yielded the territory of Rio Muni (mainland of Equatorial Guinea) to Spain. This resulted in the establishment of the Roman Catholic Church, marked by an attitude of inquisition when the Reformed Church had to face many difficulties. Intolerance and persecution produced an unavoidable change in the circumstances of the Evangelical Presbyterian Church of Spanish Guinea, which had to give up its schools and medical work. In 1924, all its missionaries were obliged to leave the country.

To revitalize the work, the American Presbyterian Mission sent a missionary couple to Equatorial Guinea in 1932. This couple was strongly engaged with the organisation of a dynamic Women's Association, which up until today remains an important part of the church. In 1936, the Youth Association was set up. In 1952, the Spanish government, which was close to the Catholic hierarchy, closed all the Protestant churches, allowing only those that existed before the establishment of Francoist Spain to re-open. In 1957, the presbytery of Rio Muni joined the Presbyterian Church of Cameroon (Église Presbyteriènne Camerounaise - EPC) as part of the regional MUNICAM synod (Muni & Cameroon). A year later, it withdrew for reasons to do with the process of decolonization, and integrated with the Synod of New Jersey (USA). Several American missionaries worked in the church during this period, but left in 1968, shortly before independence. Between 1936 and 1962 the church was strengthened by the activities of a number of pastors sent by the Presbyterian Church of Cameroon (EPC).

In 1960, about twenty delegates met for the last time as the presbytery of the Synod of New Jersey. They approved a new constitution and the church consolidated to the autonomous church referred to as the Evangelical Presbyterian Church of Spanish Guinea. After independence of the country on 12 October 1968, this church worked with the acceptance of the authorities of the new post-independence government. However, under the regime of Francisco Macías Nguema the church again experienced fierce repression and was forced to consolidate again. In 1969, the Presbyterian Church united with the church that resulted from the missionary work of the World Evangelical Crusade in the area of Akurenam (Cruzada Mundial de Evangelización), and in 1973 the two churches formed, together with the Methodist Church (Metodista), the Reformed Church of Equatorial Guinea (Iglesia Reformada de Guinea Ecuatorial) (IRGE). The Methodist Church had come into existence in Bioko through the efforts of the British Methodists. The union was ambiguous because there was no real agreement on the authority of the new church over the three pre-existing churches. Tensions were therefore bound to arise and the union fell apart.

From January 1996, the IRGE functioned as a federation of churches and its name was changed to Council of Evangelical Churches in Equatorial Guinea (CIEGE). This federation has not been functioning anymore since 1997, but first discussions are now going on about a re-establishment of this Church Council. One of the members that emerged from this federation is the autonomous Reformed Presbyterian Church of Equatorial Guinea - the IRPGE. It is reformed by its theology and Presbyterian by its form of government. The other members are the Methodist Church and the Evangelical Crusade Church.

== The IRPGE today ==
Today, the IRPGE is a minority church within the country of Equatorial Guinea, which is dominated by Roman Catholic Churches and belief. According to data collected in 2006, the IRPGE counted approximately 8,000 members in 21 congregations, including those on the mainland and on the island of Bioko. However, a more recent survey by the church ascertains a decline in memberships. The approximate number of members has fallen to 3,500 in the three presbyteries "Centro", "Corisco", and "East" and the total of now 29 congregations. According to the WCC statistics the church has 8,230 members in 29 congregations served by 21 pastors. Manuel Nzoh Asumu has been General Secretary of the IRPGE since 2009. The IRPGE is set up in a typical Presbyterian system (Presbyterianism).

Equatorial Guinea is the only Spanish-speaking country in Africa. The people in senior positions within the IRPGE speak Spanish and frequently French as a second language. Many church members do not understand Spanish very well, but mostly communicate in their local languages.

=== Church networks ===
The incorporation into national and international church networks such as the World Communion of Reformed Churches, the World Council of Churches and the Council of Evangelical Churches of Equatorial Guinea (CIEGE), is indispensable for the functioning IRPGE. The connection to the Presbyterian Church of Cameroon (EPC) appears to be still quite influential in terms of organisation, administration and education. In relation to the ordination of women, the IRPGE abides by the regulations of the EPC and does not ordinate women to date.

THE IRPGE is member of

- WCC (World Council of Churches)—worldwide fellowship of 349 churches that seek unity, a common witness, and Christian service
- WCRC (World Communion of Reformed Churches)—the largest and oldest of the four worldwide, international groupings of Reformed churches
- AACC (All Africa Conference of Churches)—African fellowship of Christian churches and institutions working together in a common witness to the gospel
- CIEGE (Council of Evangelical Churches of Equatorial Guinea)—equatoguinean fellowship of churches that "confess the Lord Jesus Christ as God and Saviour, according to the scriptures, and therefore seek to fulfil together their common calling to the glory of the one God, Father, Son, and Holy Spirit"

=== Activities ===
The IRPGE engages in projects concerning theological formation, health and education. With the support of the IRPGE, a variety of spacious buildings such as churches, dispensaries, schools and kindergartens have been or are being built in different congregations. The amelioration of infrastructure in education and health normally generates financial revenues for the respective congregation. It nevertheless does not benefit the general church administration. Newly built churches seem relatively spacious and luxurious in comparison to the number of members.

The activities and the commitment of the members of the Women’s Association are proof for very dynamic and strong groups of women that have worked together since 1948, during the existence of the IRGE. Today, the association has a national president and meets every three months. It is organized in three committees:

- Development (e.g. crop production such as bananas. The revenues flow into development projects implemented by the same association - e.g. schools)
- Evangelization and Prayer (to attend the invalid and sick people in their homes, establishes an annual prayer roll)
- Assistance and Care (to attend and take care of sick and invalid persons in their homes or in hospital. This assistance may be physical but also financial)

== See also ==
- Religion in Equatorial Guinea
- Catholic Church in Equatorial Guinea
- Episcopal Conference of Equatorial Guinea
