= Irreligion in Zambia =

Irreligion in Zambia encompasses atheism, agnosticism, skepticism, and secular humanism within the Republic of Zambia. Statistically, non-religious individuals comprise a distinct demographic minority in a country where Christianity is constitutionally declared the state religion. According to the official Zambia 2022 Census of Population and Housing, approximately 1.3% of the population identify as having "no religion".

Despite low public visibility, an organized secular humanist movement emerged in the late 2010s. The movement navigates widespread cultural ostracization, institutional religious dominance, and legal complexities within a state framework that balances its identity as a "Christian Nation" with constitutional protections for freedom of conscience.

== Demographics ==
Official statistical records regarding irreligion in Zambia have varied according to census methodology and classification criteria. In the 2000 national census, approximately 5% of citizens reported no religious affiliation or did not state a religious affiliation. The 2022 Census of Population and Housing recorded the non-religious demographic at 1.3%.

Some secular advocacy organizations argue that non-religious individuals may be underrepresented in official statistics because of social pressures surrounding religious identity. Public polling indicates that over 95 percent of the population identifies as Christian, and religion is deemed highly important by an overwhelming majority of respondents, with global spiritual indicators from the Pew Research Center tracking high levels of religious importance and prayer among Zambian adults. Consequently, organized secular groups argue that some non-religious individuals conceal their beliefs to avoid social consequences.

== Historical background ==
=== Post-Independence Secularism and "Zambian Humanism" ===
Following independence from British colonial rule in 1964, Zambia's early sociopolitical framework was distinct from its contemporary constitutionally religious stance. The founding constitution of 1964 established a sovereign republic without a constitutional declaration of Christianity as a state identity.

Zambia's first President, Kenneth Kaunda, established a socio-political state ideology known as Zambian Humanism, which was officially adopted as the national credo in April 1967. Influenced by African socialism, Christian ethical traditions, and pan-African nationalist philosophies, Zambian Humanism placed the "primacy of the human person" at the center of all state economic and social development.

While Kaunda's philosophy was rooted in general theism, it laid foundations for a civic framework that emphasized human-centered development and social responsibility. Kaunda resisted pressure to prioritize Christian law over secular law, viewing the state as an inclusive institution for citizens regardless of religious background. This commitment to state neutrality provided an important legal and political foundation for citizens with diverse religious and non-religious views.

=== The 1991 Paradigm Shift ===
The institutional landscape for non-religious citizens fundamentally shifted in December 1991, when Frederick Chiluba unseated Kaunda's one-party state. In December 1991, Chiluba publicly declared Zambia a "Christian Nation".

In 1996, the preamble of the Constitution of Zambia was formally amended to codify this religious identity. Critics of the declaration have argued that the shift affected the position of non-religious and minority religious worldviews within public life.

== Constitutional and Legal Status ==
The legal status of irreligion in Zambia is defined by a tension between the constitutional declaration of Zambia as a Christian Nation and constitutional protections for freedom of conscience and belief.

=== The "Christian Nation" Clause vs. Freedom of Conscience ===
The preamble of the Constitution of Zambia explicitly states that the country is a Christian nation. However, the constitution also protects freedom of conscience and the rights of individuals with different beliefs. Part III of the Constitution safeguards freedom of conscience under Article 19, protecting citizens' rights to freedom of thought, belief, and religion.

Legal scholars have noted that Zambia's constitutional framework creates a complex relationship between religious identity and state neutrality. Government functions in Zambia have frequently incorporated Christian prayers, while state support for religious infrastructure has also been debated, including the construction of the National House of Prayer.

Secular organizations argue that prioritizing Christian theology within state systems can marginalize non-believers and create tension with principles of equal citizenship and freedom of conscience.

=== Freedom From Religion ===
While the Constitution explicitly protects "freedom of religion", secular advocacy groups have argued for recognition of protections against religious coercion and the ability of individuals to live without religious obligations imposed by the state or society.

Because legal frameworks such as the Societies Act govern the registration of public organizations under the Office of the Registrar of Societies, organizations representing atheist or secular identities have historically operated within legal and social environments shaped by Zambia's religious context.

== Religious Education ==
The evolution of Religious Education (RE) in Zambia highlights the ongoing relationship between pluralistic educational approaches, religious identity, and constitutional debates surrounding the role of Christianity in public institutions.

Under the Kaunda administration, educational reforms aimed to transform Religious Education from a primarily confessional system inherited from colonial missionary education into a broader academic subject examining different religious traditions. By the 1980s, public schools utilized a multi-faith syllabus that included Christianity, Islam, Hinduism, and Indigenous African traditions as areas of study.

Following the 1991 Christian Nation declaration, debates emerged regarding the role and purpose of Religious Education within Zambian schools. Religious organizations and education stakeholders debated whether schools in a Christian nation should emphasize Christian instruction or maintain a broader religious studies approach.

While the official curriculum has included multiple religious traditions, researchers have noted continuing tensions between Zambia's constitutional Christian identity and efforts to maintain religious education as an inclusive academic subject.

== Public Attitudes and Social Stigma ==
Public discourse in Zambia is overwhelmingly religious, with Christianity playing a central role in national identity, social institutions, and public life.

=== Conflation with Moral Deviance ===
Social attitudes toward irreligion in Zambia are shaped by the dominant role of Christianity in cultural and political life. Atheism, agnosticism, and skepticism may be viewed negatively by some members of society and may be associated with moral rejection of religious traditions.

Non-religious individuals and secular organizations have reported experiencing social pressure surrounding expressions of non-belief, particularly within communities where religious identity is closely connected to family and social belonging.

=== Political Rhetoric ===
Political figures in Zambia have frequently incorporated religious language into public discourse, reflecting the country's declared Christian identity.

In late 2019, President Edgar Lungu made public remarks referencing biblical scripture that drew criticism from secular organizations and human rights advocates. Critics argued that statements from government leaders linking morality and belief in God could contribute to the marginalization of non-religious citizens.

== Organized Secular Movement ==
Before 2018, irreligion in Zambia lacked a formal public institutional presence and largely existed through individual expressions of skepticism or private non-belief.

== Humanists & Atheists of Zambia (HAZ) ==
In 2018, activists Larry Tepa and Thasiyana Mwandila co-founded Humanists & Atheists of Zambia (HAZ).

The organization was formed around promoting secular humanism, normalizing discussion of atheism, and advocating for freedom of conscience and secular governance.

The creation of HAZ represented one of the first organized attempts in Zambia to publicly advocate for non-religious identities and humanist values.

The background of the organization's leadership reflected a broader generational engagement with scientific literature, evolutionary biology, philosophy, and alternative interpretations of African identity and culture.

In June 2019, HAZ attracted national attention after announcing a national youth conference scheduled for later that year. The announcement generated public controversy on social media, with some religious groups calling for intervention by government authorities over concerns that the event would challenge Zambia's Christian identity.

HAZ proceeded with its activities while citing constitutional protections relating to freedom of assembly, association, and conscience.

In 2021, Humanists International awarded HAZ a digital humanism grant to develop a 12-episode educational podcast titled "Humanism in Zambia". The project was later placed on hold following leadership changes within the organization.

Tepa later became involved in international humanist organizations, including Atheist Alliance International and Young Humanists International.

== Ethical Society of Zambia (ESZ) ==
In 2022, Tepa established the Ethical Society of Zambia (ESZ). ESZ marked a strategic pivot within Zambia's secular movement, shifting focus away from primarily online philosophical discussions toward community development, literacy, mutual aid, and evidence-based education.

Operating on a philosophy that human compassion should be expressed through practical civic action, ESZ has developed programs focused on humanitarian support, education, and community advocacy.

=== Humanitarian Mutual Aid ===
Following severe drought conditions affecting Southern Africa, ESZ launched community food security initiatives aimed at supporting vulnerable communities through mutual aid and local development programs.

The organization has collaborated with international partners, including Helping Hands - Green-Ocean e.V., to support community food distribution networks and educational programs in vulnerable communities.

=== Marginalized Community Advocacy ===
ESZ has promoted human rights and community support initiatives, including advocacy related to marginalized communities and the protection of individual dignity and equality.

=== Educational Development ===
The society has developed literacy initiatives focused on indigenous language education, critical thinking, and evidence-based learning approaches.

== Academic and Public Discourse ==
Academic scholarship on irreligion in Zambia remains limited compared with research examining Christianity, religious education, and church-state relations. Existing research has primarily examined constitutional secularism, religious education, religious influence in public life, and the implications of Zambia's declaration as a Christian Nation, while organized non-religious movements have received comparatively little scholarly attention.

This limited academic literature reflects the historical dominance of religious institutions within Zambia's social and political development, where research has more frequently focused on Christianity and religious practice than on non-religious identities.

== International Engagement ==
The non-religious movement in Zambia has increasingly engaged with international human rights and secular networks. Local secular organizations maintain institutional relationships with international bodies, including Humanists International and Atheist Alliance International.

In April 2025, during an official visit by the United Nations Special Rapporteur on Freedom of Religion or Belief, Dr. Nazila Ghanea, the Ethical Society of Zambia participated in civil society consultations.

During these consultations, non-religious representatives presented perspectives concerning freedom of conscience, religious freedom, and the experiences of secular citizens within Zambia's constitutional framework.

The engagement represented an example of non-religious organizations participating in international human rights discussions concerning freedom of religion or belief in Zambia.

== See also ==
- Religion in Zambia
- Freedom of religion in Zambia
- Irreligion in Africa
