= St. James and Our Lady of the Pillar Cathedral, Bata =

St. James and Our Lady of the Pillar Cathedral
- Catedral de Santiago y Nuestra Señora del Pilar de Bata
- St. James and Our Lady of the Pillar Cathedral
- Location: Bata
- Country: Equatorial Guinea
- Denomination: Roman Catholic Church

Administration
- Diocese: Roman Catholic Diocese of Bata

The St. James and Our Lady of the Pillar Cathedral (Spanish: Catedral de Santiago y Nuestra Señora del Pilar de Bata or Catedral de Bata) or Cathedral of Bata and more formally Cathedral of St. James Apostle and Our Lady of the Pillar is a religious building that is part of the Catholic Church and serves as one of the three cathedrals that exist in the African country of Equatorial Guinea.

== History ==
St. James and Our Lady of the Pillar Cathedral is located in Bata in the Litoral province in the continental region, follows the Latin rite and was consecrated in 1954. It is the seat of the Diocese of Bata (Dioecesis Bataensis) and its bishop is Juan Matogo Oyana.

Its architecture is neo-Gothic work of several missionaries. The works for its construction began in 1951 and culminated on December 8, 1954, during the time of the Spanish rule.

In 2000 renovation work began with the support of the government of Equatorial Guinea, and was completed in 2005.

Its historical and architectural value is included in the list of national heritage monuments (patrimonio nacional).

== See also ==
- Roman Catholicism in Equatorial Guinea
