= List of Catholic dioceses in Equatorial Guinea =

The Roman Catholic Church in Equatorial Guinea (former Spanish colony in West Africa) is composed only of a Latin hierarchy,
joint in a national Episcopal Conference of Equatorial Guinea,
comprising one ecclesiastical province consisting of the Metropolitan Archdiocese and four suffragan dioceses.

There are no Eastern Catholic, pre-diocesan or other exempt jurisdictions.

There are no titular sees. All defunct jurisdictions have current successor sees.

There is formally an Apostolic Nunciature as papal diplomatic representation (embassy-level) to Equatorial Guinea, but it is vested in the Apostolic Nunciature to neighbor Cameroon, in its capital Yaoundé.

== Current Latin dioceses ==
=== Ecclesiastical Province of Malabo ===
- Metropolitan Archdiocese of Malabo
  - Diocese of Bata
  - Diocese of Ebebiyin
  - Diocese of Evinayong
  - Diocese of Mongomo

== See also ==
- List of Catholic dioceses (structured view)
- Catholic Church in Equatorial Guinea

== Sources and external links ==
- GCatholic.org - data for all sections.
- Catholic-Hierarchy entry.
