= Ebebiyín Cathedral =

- Catedral de Ebebiyín
- Ebebiyín Cathedral
- 2.15957°N 11.33399°E
- Location: Ebibeyin
- Country: Equatorial Guinea
- Denomination: Roman Catholic Church

The Ebebiyín Cathedral (Spanish: Catedral de Ebebiyín) is a religious building belonging to the Catholic Church and is located in the province of Kié-Ntem in the northeast of the mainland (Región Continental) of Equatorial Guinea near its border with Cameroon and Gabon.

== Background ==
It is one of the three cathedrals currently operating in that country, the others being: Bata and Malabo. It was completed in 1950.

It was built in Gothic style and is the seat of the Roman Catholic Diocese of Ebebiyin (also known in Latin as: dioecesis Ebebiyinensis and established on October 15, 1982) included in the ecclesiastical province of Malabo (Provincia eclesiástica de Malabo).

== See also ==
- Roman Catholicism in Equatorial Guinea
- St. Elizabeth's Cathedral, Malabo
