= Presbyterian Church of Gabon =

- Classification: Protestant
- Orientation: Presbyterian
- Theology: Reformed
- Governance: Presbyterian
- Region: Gabon
- Founder: Missions of the Presbyterian Church of Cameroon
- Origin: 2000; Gabon
- Branched from: Presbyterian Church of Cameroon
- Congregations: 6 (2022)

The Presbyterian Church of Gabon (in French: Église presbytérienne du Gabon, abbreviated EPG) is a Reformed Presbyterian Christian denomination operating in Gabon. The denomination in 2000, through missionary initiatives originating from the Presbyterian Church of Cameroon.

As of 2022, the denomination had existed for more than twenty years and maintained congregations in cities such as Libreville, Port-Gentil, Oyem, and Bitam.

== History ==
The organized Presbyterian presence under the name Presbyterian Church of Gabon emerged within the broader context of regional expansion of African Presbyterian churches in Central Africa. Missionary activities of the Presbyterian Church of Cameroon in Gabon began in 2000, a period marked by significant pastoral and missionary mobility across the region.

During its early years, the church operated without a permanent resident pastor. In 2016, the denomination appointed its first resident pastor after approximately two decades of continuous activity in the country.

By 2022, the Presbyterian Church of Gabon had approximately six active congregations, primarily located in northern and coastal urban regions of the country.

== Institutional activity ==
The Presbyterian Church of Gabon maintains a recognized public presence in the country. In 2025, the executive board of the denomination was officially received by the Ambassador of Cameroon to Gabon.

The denomination also organizes public liturgical celebrations, including Pentecost events, which have been reported by the Gabonese press in various years.

== Doctrine ==
The Presbyterian Church of Gabon follows the theological tradition of Calvinism and identifies with the heritage of the Reformed Churches. It adopts a Presbyterian system of church governance. Its doctrine and organizational structure reflect the historical influence of the Presbyterian Church of Cameroon and African Reformed Presbyterianism.

== Inter-church relations ==
The Presbyterian Church of Gabon maintains historical and fraternal relations with the Presbyterian Church of Cameroon, from which its founding missions originated. It also participates in the national Christian ecumenical landscape, engaging in dialogue with other Protestant and Reformed churches present in Gabon.
