= Roman Catholic Diocese of Evinayong =

Roman Catholic diocese in Equatorial Guinea

Diocese of Evinayong Dioecesis Evinayongensis Diócesis de Evinayong

Location
- Country: Equatorial Guinea
- Metropolitan: Archdiocese of Malabo
- Headquarters: Bata, Litoral, Equatorial Guinea

Statistics
- Area: 9,988 km^{2} (3,856 sq mi)
- Population: Total; Catholics: (as of 2023); 146,000; 106,000 (72.6%)
- Parishes: 18

Information
- Denomination: Catholic Church
- Sui iuris church: Latin Church
- Rite: Roman Rite
- Established: 1 April 2017; 9 years ago
- Cathedral: Catedral de San José of Evinavong
- Secular priests: 24 (20 Diocesan, 4 Religious Orders)

Current leadership
- Pope: Leo XIV
- Bishop: Calixto Paulino Esono Abaga Obono
- Metropolitan Archbishop: Juan Nsue Edjang Mayé

The Diocese of Evinayong is a Latin Church ecclesiastical jurisdiction or diocese of the Catholic Church in Equatorial Guinea. It is a suffragan diocese in the ecclesiastical province of the metropolitan Archdiocese of Malabo, yet depends on the missionary Roman Congregation for the Evangelization of Peoples.

Its cathedral is the Catedral de San José, dedicated to Saint Joseph, in the episcopal see of Evinayong, capital of Centro Sur province, Región Continental.

== History ==
Established in 1 April 2017 as Diocese of Evinayong / Evinayongen(sis) (Latin), on territory split off from the Diocese of Bata (in the same ecclesiastical province).

== Episcopal ordinaries ==
Bishops of Evinayong (Roman rite)

- Calixto Paulino Esono Abaga Obono (1 April 2017 – Present)

== See also ==
- List of Catholic dioceses in Equatorial Guinea

== Sources and external links ==
- GCatholic with Google satellite photo - data for all sections
