= Anacleto Sima Ngua =

Equatoguinean clergyman (1936–2018)

- Bishop of Bata
- Church: Catholic Church
- Diocese: Diocese of Bata
- In office: 19 November 1982 – 11 May 2002
- Predecessor: Rafael María Nze Abuy
- Successor: Juan Matogo Oyana

Orders
- Ordination: 24 June 1963
- Consecration: 6 January 1983 by Pope John Paul II

Personal details
- Born: 2 June 1936 Mitemleté, Spanish Territories on the Gulf of Guinea, Spanish Empire
- Died: 1 July 2018 (aged 82) Malabo, Bioko Norte, Equatorial Guinea

Anacleto Sima Ngua (2 June 1936 – 1 July 2018) was an Equatoguinean Roman Catholic bishop.

Sima was born in Spanish Guinea and was ordained to the priesthood in 1962. He served as bishop of the Roman Catholic Diocese of Bata, Equatorial Guinea, from 1983 to 2002.
