= Diocese of Ebebiyín =

Roman Catholic diocese in Equatorial Guinea

Coordinates: 2.1562°N 11.3303°E

Diocese of Ebebiyín Dioecesis Ebebiyinensis Diócesis de Ebibeyín

Location
- Country: Equatorial Guinea
- Metropolitan: Archdiocese of Malabo
- Headquarters: Ebibeyin, Kié-Ntem, Equatorial Guinea

Statistics
- Area: 3,943 km^{2} (1,522 sq mi)
- Population: Total; Catholics: (as of 2023); 292,440; 273,000 (93.4%)
- Parishes: 15

Information
- Denomination: Catholic Church
- Sui iuris church: Latin Church
- Rite: Roman Rite
- Established: 15 October 1982; 44 years ago
- Cathedral: Ebebiyín Cathedral
- Patron saint: Our Lady of Begoña
- Secular priests: 40 (30 Diocesan, 10 Religious Orders)

Current leadership
- Pope: Leo XIV
- Bishop: Sede vacante
- Metropolitan Archbishop: Juan Nsue Edjang Mayé
- Apostolic Administrator: Apolinar Mbo Olinga Nchama

The Roman Catholic Diocese of Ebibeyín (Latin: Ebibeyinen(sis); officially, the Diocese "Virgin of Begoña, Mother of Christ" of Ebibeyín) is a diocese in the ecclesiastical province (covering all Equatorial Guinea) of Malabo, yet depends on the missionary Roman Congregation for the Evangelization of Peoples.

Its cathedral episcopal see is located in the city of Ebibeyin, Kié-Ntem province, Región Continental.

== Statistics ==
As of 2023, it pastorally served 273,000 Catholics (93.4% of 292,440 total) on 3,943 km^{2} in 15 parishes with 40 priests (30 diocesan, 10 religious), and 46 lay religious (16 brothers, 30 sisters).

Shortly before the 2017 loss territory associated with the establishment of the Diocese of Mongomo, it had an area of 12,000 square miles, a total population of 204,000, a Catholic population of 164,000, 33 priests and 89 religious.

== History ==
- 15 October 1982: Established as Diocese of Ebibeyín, on territory split off from the Diocese of Bata
- 18 November 1983: Gained more territory from the Diocese of Bata
- 1 April 2017: Lost territory to establish the Diocese of Mongomo (in the same ecclesiastical province)

== Leadership ==
=== Bishops of Ebibeyín ===
- Ildefonso Obama Obono (15 October 1982 – 9 July 1991), appointed Archbishop of Malabo
- Juan Matogo Oyana, C.M.F. (11 October 1991 – 11 May 2002), appointed Bishop of Bata
- Alfredo María Oburu Asue, C.M.F. (8 March 2003 – 27 August 2006)
- Juan Nsue Edjang Mayé (19 February 2011 – 11 February 2015), appointed Archbishop of Malabo
- Miguel Angel Nguema Bee, S.D.B. (1 April 2017 – 14 May 2026)
  - Apostolic Administrator Apolinar Mbo Olinga Nchama (28 June 2026 – Present), Priest of Ebibeyín

== See also ==
- List of Catholic dioceses in Equatorial Guinea
- Roman Catholicism in Equatorial Guinea
