= Religion in Equatorial Guinea =

Religion in Equatorial Guinea (2020 ARDA estimate)
1. Catholic Church (71.3%)
2. Other Christian (17.0%)
3. No religion (5.50%)
4. Muslim (4.10%)
5. Traditional faiths (1.80%)
6. Other (0.30%)

St. Elizabeth's Cathedral in the city of Malabo.

Christianity is the dominant religion in Equatorial Guinea, with the Catholic Church having the most members. There are also substantial minorities of the adherents of traditional faiths and Islam.

Equatorial Guinea is a secular state, and the nation's constitution provides for freedom of religion and worship, and prohibits political parties based on religious affiliation.

== Legislation ==
The Constitution of Equatorial Guinea provides for the freedom of religion, and prohibits the establishment of political parties on the basis of religion. The law establishes no state religion, but the government gives preference to the Roman Catholic Church and the Reformed Church of Equatorial Guinea, which are the only religious groups not required to register their organization or activities with the Ministry of Justice, Religious Affairs, and Penitentiary Institutions (MJRAPI).

The government provides funds to the Catholic Church and its schools for educational programming. Catholic masses are also a normal part of official government ceremonial functions.

Permits are required for door-to-door proselytism. While some time limits are officially imposed on public religious activities, Evangelical Christian groups often hold activities outside the prescribed period without government intervention.
