= St. Elizabeth's Cathedral, Malabo =

Coordinates: 3.7569°N 8.7827°E

St. Elizabeth's Cathedral
- Catedral de Santa Isabel

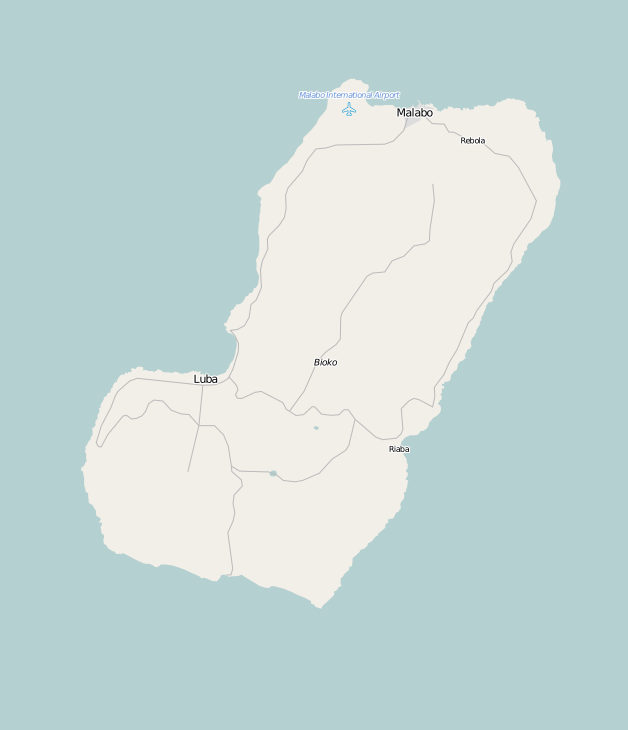
- location on the island of Bioko
- Location: Malabo
- Country: Equatorial Guinea
- Denomination: Roman Catholic Church

St. Elizabeth's Cathedral (Spanish: Catedral de Santa Isabel de Malabo or Catedral de Malabo) is a Roman Catholic cathedral located on Independencia Avenue (Avenida de la Independencia) in the city of Malabo, the former capital of Equatorial Guinea, home of the Archdiocese of Malabo. It is considered the largest Christian church in the nation. It was named after St. Elizabeth of Hungary. The cathedral was seriously damaged by fire on January 16, 2020 while restoration work was underway.

== Construction ==
Its construction began in 1897 with donations from parishioners, commercial companies and the Spanish government, for it was one of its colonies. The architect of the monument was Luis Segarra Llairadó, and was inaugurated in 1916.

It is built in a neo-Gothic style that emphasizes its façade, flanked by two 40-meter-high (130 ft) towers, and a nave with two aisles.

== See also ==
- Roman Catholicism in Equatorial Guinea
- St. Elizabeth's Church (disambiguation)
