= Presbyterian Church of Cameroon =

Cameroon Presbyterian Church
- Classification: Protestant
- Orientation: Presbyterian
- Theology: Reformed
- Governance: Presbyterian
- Associations: World Council of Churches and World Communion of Reformed Churches
- Region: Cameroon
- Origin: 1886
- Branched from: Presbyterian Church (USA)
- Separations: 1934: African Protestant Church
- Congregations: 1,364 (2012)
- Members: 4,000,000 (2018)
- Official website: www.facebook.com/EPCameroun/

The Presbyterian Church of Cameroon (in French: Église presbytérienne camerounaise) is a reformed presbyterian denomination in Cameroon founded by missionaries from the Presbyterian Church (USA).

As of 2018, it was reported that it had 4 million members.

== History ==
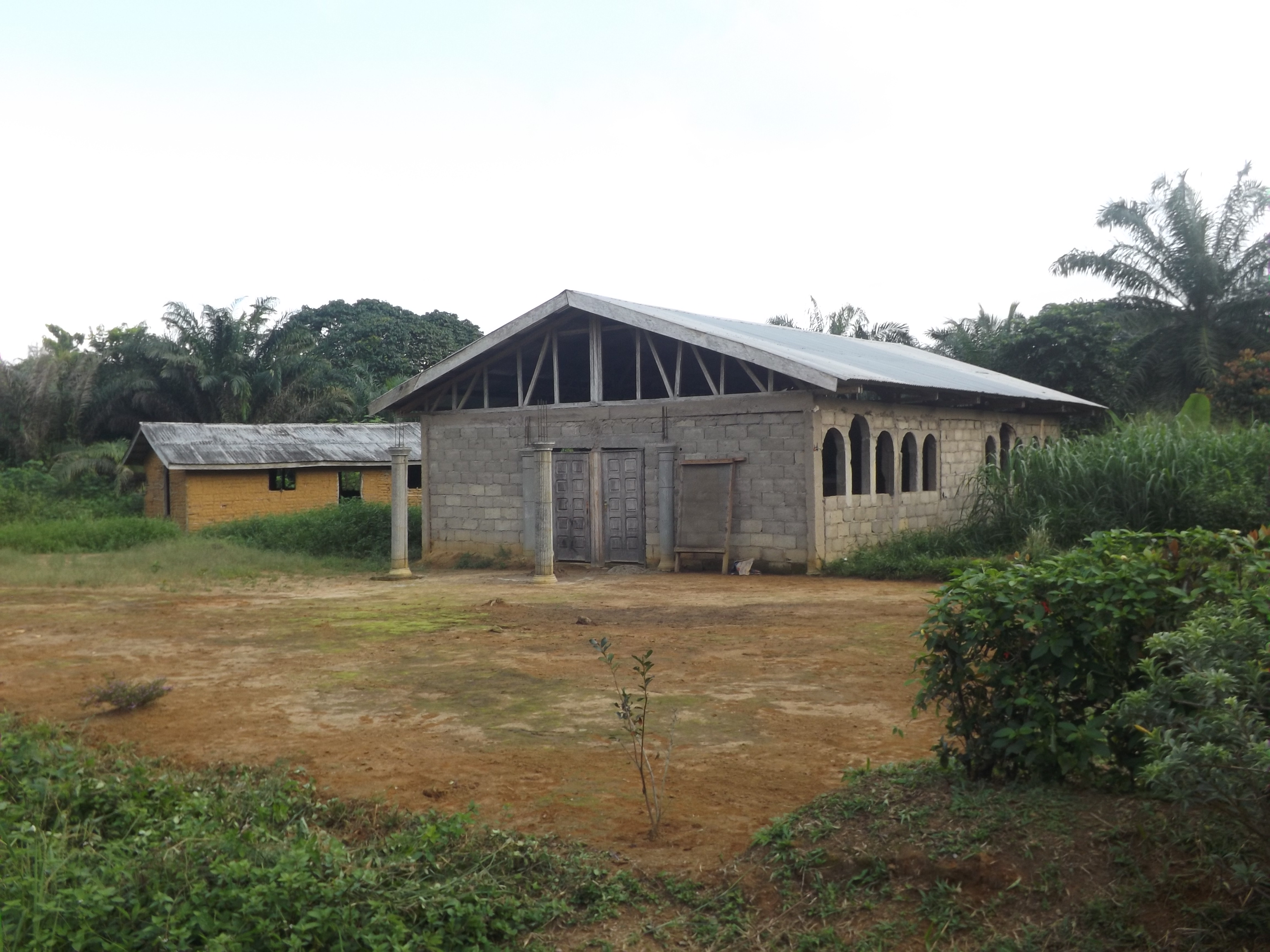
Presbyterian Church in Tayap.

The American Presbyterian Mission of the Presbyterian Church (U.S.A.) began working in Cameroon in 1875 and gave rise to several local churches. The Basel Mission also worked in the country from 1886. The Americans established mission stations in southern Cameroon and Batanga. In 1892 he began work with the Bulu people and in 1900 the first converts of these were baptized.

Between 1898 and 1901 an uprising occurred among the Bulu people who sought to defend their trade monopoly against competing caravans from Yaoundé to the port of Kribi. In the course of events the Germans confiscated the American missionary post at Lolodorf because of its strategic location. In response to protests by the United States government the mission was compensated for the damages. But relations between the colonial authorities and the American mission deteriorated. Their schools received no subsidies, and their students were not admitted to the German examinations.

Later, German-speaking missionaries were recruited for the country. Stations were opened in Elat, Lolodorf, Metet, Foulassi, Yaoundé, Bafia, Abong Mbang, Batouri and Momjepom. In 1894 the Bible and hymns were translated into the Bulu language.

In 1920 the Paris Evangelical Mission Society handed over its properties to the American mission in the former Basel Mission area around Edea and the upper Sanaga extending to Sakbayene with 94 congregations. Since the Bassa people in this region refused to adopt the Bulu language, efforts were made to translate the Bible into their own language, which was completed in 1960.

The church became autonomous in 1957, at that time with about 69,000 members.

== Statistics ==
Year	Membership
2006	1,800,000
2018	4,000,000

In 2006, the denomination had about 1,800,000 members, equivalent to 9% of the country's population.

In 2018, it was reported that it had 4 million members.

== Doctrine ==
The church subscribes to the Westminster Confession of Faith, Heidelberg Catechism, Apostles' Creed and Nicene Creed.

== Inter-Church Relations ==
The church is a member of the World Council of Churches and World Communion of Reformed Churches. . It has established fraternal relations with the Evangelical Church of Cameroon, the Presbyterian Church (USA) and the Presbyterian Church of Gabon.
