= Archdiocese of Malabo =

Roman Catholic archdiocese in Equatorial Guinea

Coordinates: 3.7570°N 8.7828°E

Archdiocese of Malabo Archidioecesis Malaboënsis Arquidiócesis de Malabo
- Santa Isabel Cathedral in Malabo

Location
- Country: Equatorial Guinea
- Ecclesiastical province: Malabo

Information
- Denomination: Roman Catholic
- Rite: Roman Rite
- Established: 10 October 1855
- Cathedral: Santa Isabel Cathedral

Current leadership
- Pope: Leo XIV
- Metropolitan Archbishop: Juan Nsue Edjang Mayé
- Bishops emeritus: Ildefonso Obama Obono

The Roman Catholic Archdiocese of Malabo (Latin: Archidioecesis Malaboënsis) is the Metropolitan See for the ecclesiastical province of Malabo in Equatorial Guinea.

== History ==
- 1855.10.10: Established as Apostolic Vicariate of Annobon, Corisco and Fernando Poo Islands from the Apostolic Vicariate of Two Guineas and Senegambia in Gabon
- 1904.05.12: Renamed as Apostolic Vicariate of Fernando Poo
- 1966.05.03: Promoted as Diocese of Santa Isabel
- 1974.04.14: Renamed as Diocese of Malabo
- 1982.10.15: Promoted as Metropolitan Archdiocese of Malabo

== Ordinaries ==
=== Vicars Apostolic ===
1. Armengol Coll y Armengol, CMF (August 1890 – 21 April 1918)
2. Nicolás González y Pérez, CMF (24 August 1918 – 23 March 1935)
3. Leoncio Fernández Galilea, CMF (18 June 1935 – 15 February 1957)
4. Francisco Gómez Marijuán, CMF (14 November 1957 – 3 May 1966)

=== Bishops and Archbishops of Malabo ===
1. Francisco Gómez Marijuán, CMF (3 May 1966 – 9 May 1974)
2. Vicente Bernikon (9 May 1974 – 14 September 1976)
3. Rafael María Nze Abuy, CMF (21 October 1982 – 7 July 1991)
4. Ildefonso Obama Obono (9 July 1991 – 11 February 2015)
5. Juan Nsue Edjang Mayé (11 February 2015 – )

== Suffragan dioceses ==
- Bata
- Ebebiyin
- Evinayong
- Mongomo

== See also ==
- Roman Catholicism in Equatorial Guinea
- Roman Catholic dioceses in Equatorial Guinea

== Sources ==
- GCatholic.org
