= Roman Catholic Diocese of Mongomo =

Roman Catholic diocese in Equatorial Guinea

Diocese of Mongomo Dioecesis Mongomensis Diócesis de Mongomo
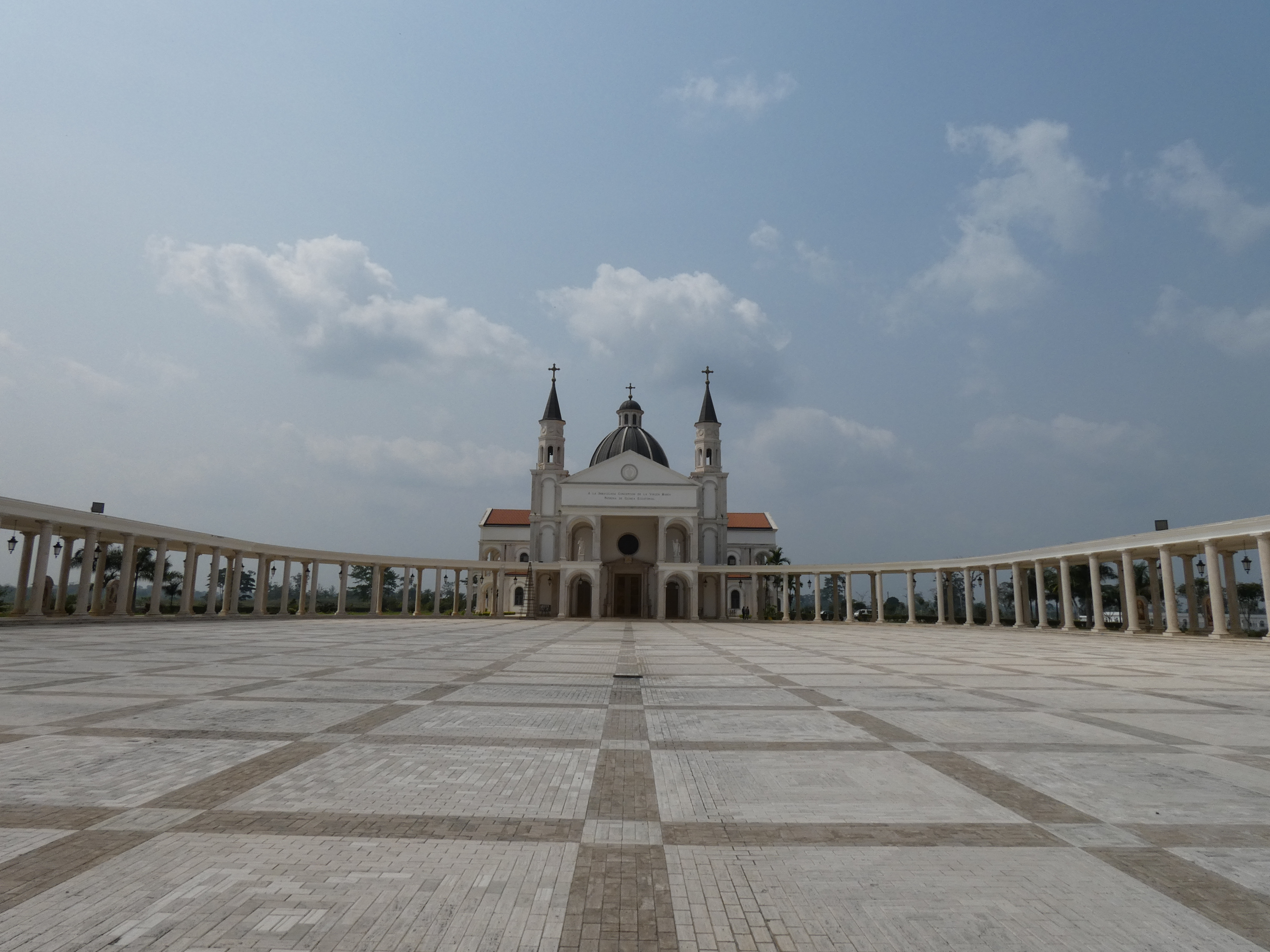
- Basilica of the Immaculate Conception, Mongomo

Location
- Country: Equatorial Guinea
- Metropolitan: Archdiocese of Malabo
- Headquarters: Mongomo, Wele-Nzas, Equatorial Guinea

Statistics
- Area: 5,478 km^{2} (2,115 sq mi)
- Population: Total; Catholics: (as of 2023); 376,000; 302,000 (80.3%)
- Parishes: 12

Information
- Denomination: Catholic Church
- Sui iuris church: Latin Church
- Rite: Roman Rite
- Established: 1 April 2017; 9 years ago
- Cathedral: Basilica of the Immaculate Conception, Mongomo
- Secular priests: 28 (24 Diocesan, 4 Religious Orders)

Current leadership
- Pope: Leo XIV
- Bishop: Juan Domingo-Beka Esono Ayang, C.M.F.
- Metropolitan Archbishop: Juan Nsue Edjang Mayé

The Roman Catholic Diocese of Mongomo is a Latin Catholic suffragan bishopric in the ecclesiastical province (covering all Equatorial Guinea) of the Metropolitan Archdiocese of Malabo, yet depends on the missionary Roman Congregation for the Evangelization of Peoples.

Its cathedral episcopal see is a minor basilica, the Catedral Basílica de la Inmaculada Concepción, dedicated to the Immaculate Conception, in Mongomo, Wele-Nzas province, Región Continentale.

== History ==
Established on 1 April 2017 as Diocese of Mongomo / Mongomen(sis) (Latin), on territory split off from the Diocese of Ebebiyín (in the same ecclesiastical province).

== Statistics ==
As of 2023, it pastorally served 302,000 Catholics (80.3% of the population) in 12 parishes with 24 diocesan and 4 religious priests and 22 female religious.

== Episcopal ordinaries ==
(all Roman Rite)

Suffragan Bishops of Mongomo

- Juan Domingo-Beka Esono Ayang, S.M.F. (1 April 2017 – Present)

== See also ==
- List of Catholic dioceses in Equatorial Guinea

== Sources and external links ==
- GCatholic with Google map - data for all sections except statistics
- CatholicHierarchy - statistics
