= Diocese of Bata =

Roman Catholic diocese in Equatorial Guinea

Coordinates: 1.8670°N 9.7694°E

Diocese of Bata Dioecesis Bataensis Diócesis de Bata
- St. James and Our Lady of the Pillar Cathedral, Bata

Location
- Country: Equatorial Guinea
- Metropolitan: Archdiocese of Malabo
- Headquarters: Bata, Litoral, Equatorial Guinea

Statistics
- Area: 6,681 km^{2} (2,580 sq mi)
- Population: Total; Catholics: (as of 2023); 117,000; 81,000 (69.2%)
- Parishes: 26

Information
- Denomination: Catholic Church
- Sui iuris church: Latin Church
- Rite: Roman Rite
- Established: 9 August 1965; 61 years ago
- Cathedral: St. James and Our Lady of the Pillar Cathedral, Bata
- Secular priests: 74 (52 Diocesan, 22 Religious Orders)

Current leadership
- Pope: Leo XIV
- Bishop: Miguel Angel Nguema Bee, S.D.B.
- Metropolitan Archbishop: Juan Nsue Edjang Mayé
- Bishops emeritus: Juan Matogo Oyana, C.M.F.

The Roman Catholic Diocese of Bata (Latin: Bataën(sis)) is a suffragan Latin diocese in the ecclesiastical province of Malabo in Equatorial Guinea, yet depends on the missionary Roman Congregation for the Evangelization of Peoples.

Its cathedral episcopal see is the St. James and Our Lady of the Pillar Cathedral, dedicated to Saint James the Elder and Our Lady of Pilar, in the city of Bata.

== History ==
- Established on 9 August 1965 as Apostolic Vicariate of Río Muni, on territory split off from the Apostolic Vicariate of Fernando Poo
- Promoted on 3 May 1966 as Diocese of Bata
- Enjoyed a Papal visit from Pope John Paul II in February 1982
- Lost territories twice: on 15 October 1982 to establish the Diocese of Ebebiyín and on 1 April 2017 to establish the Diocese of Evinayong

== Statistics ==
As of 2023, it pastorally served 81,000 Catholics (69.2% of 117,000 total) on 6,681 km² in 26 parishes with 74 priests (52 diocesan, 22 religious), and 95 lay religious (49 brothers, 46 sisters).

== Episcopal ordinaries ==
(all Roman rite)

Apostolic Vicar of Río Muni

- Rafael María Nze Abuy, C.M.F. (9 August 1965 – 3 May 1966 see below)

Suffragan Bishops of Bata

- Rafael María Nze Abuy, C.M.F. (see above 3 May 1966 – 9 May 1974 see below), resigned
  - Apostolic Administrator Ildefonso Obama Obono (4 May 1971 – 1975), priest of Río Muni
  - Apostolic Administrator Vicente Bernikon (1975 – 14 September 1976), Bishop of Malabo
- Rafael María Nze Abuy, C.M.F. (see above 26 June 1980 – 21 October 1982), appointed Archbishop of Malabo
- Anacleto Sima Ngua (19 November 1982 – 11 May 2002), resigned
- Juan Matogo Oyana, C.M.F. (11 May 2002 – 10 December 2024), retired
  - Apostolic Administrator Miguel Angel Nguema Bee, S.D.B. (10 December 2024 – 14 May 2026 see below), Bishop of Ebebiyín
- Miguel Angel Nguema Bee, S.D.B. (see above 14 May 2026 – Present)

Other priests of this diocese who became bishops

- Ildefonso Obama Obono (1965-1982), appointed Bishop of Ebebiyín in 1982
- Calixto Paulino Esono Abaga Obono (2000-2017), appoint Bishop of Evinayong in 2017

== See also ==
- List of Catholic dioceses in Equatorial Guinea
- Roman Catholicism in Equatorial Guinea
