= Freedom of religion in Africa by country =

The status of religious freedom in Africa varies from country to country. States can differ based on whether or not they guarantee equal treatment under law for followers of different religions, whether they establish a state religion (and the legal implications that this has for both practitioners and non-practitioners), the extent to which religious organizations operating within the country are policed, and the extent to which religious law is used as a basis for the country's legal code.

There are further discrepancies between some countries' self-proclaimed stances of religious freedom in law and the actual practice of authority bodies within those countries: a country's establishment of religious equality in their constitution or laws does not necessarily translate into freedom of practice for residents of the country. Additionally, similar practices (such as having citizens identify their religious preference to the government or on identification cards) can have different consequences depending on other sociopolitical circumstances specific to the countries in question. Most countries in Africa legally establish that freedom of religion is a right conferred to all individuals. The extent to which this is enforced in practice varies greatly from country to country. Several countries have anti-discrimination laws which prohibit religious discrimination. Several countries, particularly in West Africa and Southern Africa, have a high degree of religious tolerance, both as enforced by the government, and as reflected by societal attitudes. Others, however, have significant levels of religious discrimination, either practiced by government apparatuses or by the general public. Groups facing significant levels of legal discrimination in Africa include Muslims (in majority Christian countries), Christians (in majority Muslim countries), Baháʼí Faith practitioners, Ahmadiyya Muslims (in Muslim countries), and Rastafarians. Additionally, some countries have significant levels of societal animosity against atheists. Some countries ban witchcraft. Several countries establish Islam as a state religion, and some countries with significant Muslim populations also have significant government oversight of Islamic practice in the country, up to and including the establishment of religious Islamic courts, which are most commonly used for family law. These courts are usually present in addition to secular courts, and typically have a subordinate role, although this is not always the case.

Several countries require that religious organizations register with the government, and some ban the establishment of religious political parties. Several countries provide funding for religious institutions and/or pilgrimages.

Religiously motivated violence is present in some countries, particularly ones that have a high level of political instability or active insurgencies.

== Algeria ==
Freedom of religion in Algeria is regulated by the Algerian Constitution, which declares Islam to be the state religion (Article 2) but also declares that "freedom of creed and opinion is inviolable" (Article 36); it prohibits discrimination, Article 29 states "All citizens are equal before the law. No discrimination shall prevail because of birth, race, sex, opinion or any other personal or social condition or circumstance". In practice, the government generally respects this, with some limited exceptions.

The government follows a de facto policy of tolerance by allowing, in limited instances, the conduct of religious services by non-Muslim faiths in the capital which are open to the public. The small Christian and tiny Jewish populations generally practice their faiths without government interference, although there have been several instances where the Algerian government has closed non-Muslim places of worship, most recently from 2017-2019 during which time eighteen Christian churches have been forcibly shut down. The law does not recognize marriages between Muslim women and non-Muslim men; it does however recognise marriages between Muslim men and non-Muslim women. By law, children follow the religion of their fathers, even if they are born abroad and are citizens of their (non-Muslim) country of birth.

== Angola ==
The Constitution of Angola defines the state as secular; it provides for freedom of conscience, religion, and worship, prohibits religious discrimination, and requires the state to protect churches and religious groups as long as they comply with the law. Christianity is the religion of the vast majority of the population, with approximately 40% following Catholicism and 40% following a Protestant denomination; 10% have no religious affiliation. There is also a small Muslim community, estimated at 80-90,000 adherents.

The government has banned 17 religious groups in Cabinda on charges of practicing harmful exorcism rituals on adults and children accused of "witchcraft," illegally holding religious services in residences, and not being registered. Although the law does not recognize the existence of witchcraft, abusive actions committed while practicing a religion are illegal. Members of these groups are not harassed, but two leaders were convicted in 2006 of child abuse and sentenced to 8 years' imprisonment.

== Benin ==
The Constitution of Benin establishes a secular state and provides for freedom of religious thought, expression, and practice. Religious groups in Benin are allowed to set up private schools, but public schools are secular and must not teach religion.

== Botswana ==
The Constitution of Botswana provides for freedom of religion, and the government enforces this practice at all levels.

Religious education is part of the curriculum in public schools; it emphasizes Christianity (the religion of roughly 70% of the population) but addresses other religious groups in the country. The constitution provides that every religious community may establish places for religious instruction at the community's expense. The constitution prohibits forced religious instruction, forced participation in religious ceremonies, or taking oaths that run counter to an individual's religious beliefs.

== Burkina Faso ==
Article 31 of the Constitution of Burkina Faso states that Burkina Faso is a secular state.

Public schools do not offer religious instruction. Muslim, Catholic, and Protestant groups operate primary and secondary schools. Although school officials have to submit the names of their directors to the government and register their schools, religious or otherwise, the government does not appoint or approve these officials.

In 2022, over 20% of schools were closed due to terrorist actions.

== Burundi ==
The Constitution of Burundi defines the state as secular; it also provides for freedom of conscience and religion, as well as prohibiting religious discrimination. The law requires religious groups to register with the Ministry of Interior (MOI) before operating.

== Cameroon ==
The Constitution of Cameroon provides for freedom of religion and worship; there is no official state religion. Missionary groups are present and operate without impediment.

Several religious denominations operate primary and secondary schools; while public schools cannot teach religious education, private schools can do so.

== Cape Verde ==
The constitution for freedom of religion and worship and protects the right of individuals to choose, practice, profess, and change their religion. The Catholic Church maintains a privileged position in national life; for example, in the past, the government provided the Catholic Church with free television broadcast time for religious purposes (an estimated 85% of the population of Cape Verde is Catholic).

In 2021, there were no reports of significant societal actions affecting religious freedom.

== Central African Republic ==
The Constitution of the Central African Republic The constitution establishes the country as a secular state. It also provides for freedom of religion and equal protection under the law.

Students are not compelled to participate in religious education, and they are free to attend any religious program of their choosing. Although the government does not explicitly prohibit religious instruction in public schools, such instruction is not part of the overall public school curriculum, nor is it common.

In the past, witchcraft has been a criminal offense punishable by execution under the penal code, but with most sentences being 1-5 years in prison or a fine of up to $1,500 (817,836 CFA francs); individuals arrested for witchcraft were generally arrested in conjunction with another offense, such as murder.

Religious groups that the Government considered "subversive", a term not specifically defined by the government, are subject to sanctions by the Ministry of Interior. When imposing sanctions, the Ministry of Interior may decline to register, suspend the operations of, or ban any organization that it deems offensive to public morals or likely to disturb the peace. The Ministry of Interior may also intervene in religious organizations to resolve internal conflicts about property, finances, or leadership within religious groups.

== Chad ==
Article 1 of the Constitution of Chad declares that the country is a secular state and "affirm[s] the separation of the religions and of the State". However, some policies favor Islam in practice. For example, a committee composed of members of the High Council for Islamic Affairs and the Directorate of Religious Affairs in the Ministry of the Interior organizes the Hajj and the Umra. In the past the Association of Evangelical Churches criticized government-sponsored Hajj trips as eroding the traditionally secular stance of the country.

The government indirectly monitors Muslim activities through the pro-government High Islamic Council. The High Council, in coordination with the president, also has the responsibility of appointing the grand imam - a spiritual leader for all Muslims in the country who oversees each region's high imam and serves as head of the council. In principle, the grand imam has the authority to restrict proselytizing by other Islamic groups throughout the country, regulate the content of sermons in mosques, and exert control over activities of Muslim charities operating in the country. The Al Mountada al Islami and the World Association for Muslim Youth organizations were banned by the government for portraying violence as a legitimate precept of Islam. The government has also banned the Sufi religious group Al Faid al-Djaria for engaging in various practices deemed un-Islamic to religious authorities, such as the incorporation of singing and dancing into religious services.

Religious leaders have also been involved in managing the country's wealth. A representative of the religious community sits on the Revenue Management College, the body that oversees the allocation of oil revenues. The seat has rotated between Muslim and Christian leaders every 4 years.

Public schools conduct instruction in French, and public bilingual schools conduct classes in French and Arabic. The government prohibits religious instruction in public schools but permits all religious groups to operate private schools without restriction. The poor quality of Chad's educational system has prompted many Muslim families to look to Islamic schools as an opportunity for educating children who would otherwise have little or no access to formal schooling. Most large towns have at least one or two private religious schools. Although the government does not publish official records on school funding, many Islamic schools were commonly understood to be financed by Arab donors (governments, nongovernmental organizations (NGOs), and individuals), particularly from Saudi Arabia, Egypt, and Libya.

== Comoros ==
The Constitution of the Comoros provides for freedom of religion, but the government limits this right in practice. In 2009, an amendment to the constitution established Islam as the state religion.

Foreigners caught proselytizing for religions other than Islam are subject to deportation. Citizens who convert away from Islam face shunning from society.

The constitution notes that the Grand Mufti of Comoros is appointed by the president, and will head the Supreme National Institution on Charge of Religious Practices. He will also advise the government on practices of Islamic law.

The tenets of Islam are taught in conjunction with the Arabic language in public and private schools, and at public pre-schools.

There is societal discrimination against non-Muslims citizens in some sectors of society.

== Democratic Republic of the Congo ==
The constitution provides for freedom of religion and prohibits religious discrimination. However, violence between Muslims and other religious groups in the Congo, especially Congolese Christians, has been attested in North Kivu since 2014 in connection with the Allied Democratic Forces insurgency begun in neighboring Uganda. The Allied Democratic Forces, whose political ideology is based on Islamism, is widely suspected of having perpetrated the Beni massacre in August 2016.

The law provides for the establishment and operation of religious institutions and requires practicing religious groups to register with the government; registration requirements were simple and implemented in a nondiscriminatory manner. In practice unregistered religious groups operated unhindered.

== Djibouti ==
Article 1 of the Constitution of Djibouti names Islam as the sole state religion, and Article 11 provides for the equality of citizens of all faiths and freedom of religious practice. The equality of citizens regardless of religion is also stressed repeatedly in other articles as well. The constitution also forbids religiously based political parties in Article 6.

According to the International Religious Freedom Report 2014, while Muslim Djiboutians have the legal right to convert to or marry someone from another faith, converts may encounter negative reactions from their family and clan or from society at large, and they often face pressure to revert to Islam.

In 2012, a law was passed that grants the Ministry of Religious Affairs increased oversight of Djibouti's mosques, including of messages disseminated during Friday prayers. By 2022, the Ministry of Islamic Affairs vetted all Friday prayer service sermons.

In 2014, the government issued a decree executing a law on state control of mosques which converted the status of imams into civil service employees under the Ministry of Islamic Affairs and transferred ownership of mosque properties and other assets to the government. The Secretary General of the Ministry of Religious Affairs stated the decree aims to eliminate political activity from mosques and provide greater government oversight of mosque assets and activities. Government officials also indicated the law was designed to counter perceived foreign influence in mosques.

According to article 23 of the Family Code, a non-Muslim man may marry a Muslim woman only after converting to Islam. Non-Islamic marriages are not legally recognized by the government, which only recognizes marriages performed in accordance with the Ministry of Islamic Affairs or the Ministry of the Interior.

Public schools are secular, although the Ministry of Islamic Affairs requires that a civic and moral education course (based on Islamic principles) must be taught; private schools must teach the same course.

== Egypt ==
Constitutionally, freedom of belief is "absolute" and the practice of religious rites is provided in Egypt, but the government has historically persecuted its Coptic minority and unrecognized religions. Islam is the official state religion, and Shari'a is the primary source of all new legislation. Egypt's population is majority Sunni Muslims. Shi'a Muslims constitute less than 1 percent of the population. Estimates of the percentage of Christians range from 10 to 20 percent.

=== Treatment of Coptic Christians ===
Coptic Christians, an ethnoreligious group indigenous to Egypt, face discrimination at multiple levels of the government, ranging from a disproportional representation in government ministries to laws that limit their ability to build or repair churches. Coptic Christians are minimally represented in law enforcement, state security, and public office, and are discriminated against in the workforce on the basis of their religion. In 2009, The Pew Forum ranked Egypt among the 12 worst countries in the world in terms of religious violence against religious minorities and in terms of social hostilities against Christians.

=== Treatment of Ahmadiyya Muslims ===
The Ahmadiyya movement in Egypt, which numbers up to 50,000 adherents in the country, was established in 1922 but has seen an increase in hostility and government repression as of the 21st century. The Al-Azhar University has denounced the Ahmadis and Ahmadis have been hounded by police along with other Muslim groups deemed to be deviant under Egypt's defamation laws.

=== Treatment of Baháʼí ===
Egypt's government-issued ID cards have historically declared the holder's religion, but only the religions of Islam, Christianity, and Judaism were considered valid options by the government. As an unrecognized religious group that faced explicit government persecution for much of the 20th century, members of the Baháʼí Faith in Egypt (est. pop 2,000) historically would rely on sympathetic government clerks to get their ID cards marked with either a dash, "other", or Baháʼí.

As Egypt adopted an electronic ID system in the 1990s, Electronic processing locked out the possibility of an unlisted religion, or any religious affiliation other than Muslim, Christian, or Jewish. Consequently, adherents of any other faith (or no faith) became unable to obtain any government identification documents (such as national identification cards, birth certificates, death certificates, marriage or divorce certificates, or passports) necessary to exercise their rights in their country unless they lied about their religion. Baháʼís became virtual non-citizens, without access to employment, education, and all government services, including hospital care.

In a series of court cases from 2006 to 2008, judges ruled that the government should issue ID cards with a dash instead of religious affiliation for Baháʼí citizens. The issue is presumed to have been resolved as of 2009.

=== Treatment of atheists ===
There are Egyptians who identify themselves as atheist and agnostic. It is however difficult to quantify their number as the stigma attached to being one makes it hard for irreligious Egyptians to publicly profess their views. Furthermore, public statements that can be deemed critical of Islam or Christianity can be tried under the country's notorious blasphemy law. Outspoken atheists, like Alber Saber, have been convicted under this law.

The number of atheists is reportedly on the rise among the country's youth, many of whom organize and communicate with each other on the internet. In 2013 an Egyptian newspaper reported that 3 million out of 84 million Egyptians are atheists. While the government has acknowledged this trend, it has dealt with it as a problem that needs to be confronted, comparing it to religious extremism. Despite hostile sentiments towards them atheists in Egypt have become increasingly vocal on internet platforms like YouTube and Facebook since the Egyptian revolution of 2011, with some videos discussing atheist ideas receiving millions of views.

In a 2011 Pew Research poll of 1,798 Muslims in Egypt, 63% of those surveyed supported "the death penalty for people who leave the Muslim religion." However, no such punishment actually exists in the country. In January 2018 the head of the parliament's religious committee, Amr Hamroush, suggested a bill to make atheism illegal, stating that "it [atheism] must be criminalised and categorised as contempt of religion because atheists have no doctrine and try to insult the Abrahamic religions".

Atheists or irreligious people cannot change their official religious status, thus statistically they are counted as followers of the religion they were born with.

== Equatorial Guinea ==
The Constitution of Equatorial Guinea provides for the freedom of religion, and prohibits the establishment of political parties on the basis of religion. The law establishes no state religion, but the government gives preference to the Roman Catholic Church and the Reformed Church of Equatorial Guinea, which are the only religious groups not required to register their organization or activities with the Ministry of Justice, Religious Affairs, and Penitentiary Institutions (MJRAPI).

The government provides funds to the Catholic Church and its schools for educational programming. Catholic masses are also a normal part of official government ceremonial functions.

Foreign missionaries can work in the country, although permits are required for door-to-door proselytism.

== Eritrea ==
Eritrea officially recognizes only the Orthodox, Catholic, and Lutheran Christian churches and Sunni Islam. Those practicing religions that are not recognized face imprisonment. Human rights groups like Amnesty International and Human Rights Watch have documented serious violations of the right to freedom of religion. They report disruption of private worship, mass arrests of participants at religious weddings, prayer meetings, and other gatherings.

== Eswatini ==
The constitution and laws protect religious freedom in Eswatini. In the past, "minority religious groups enjoy fewer protections under traditional laws and customs, which include traditional courts and the authority of approximately 360 chiefs".

New congregations must submit applications to the authorities through one of three umbrella bodies: the League of Churches, Swaziland Conference of Churches, or Council of Swaziland Churches. Religious groups must obtain the approval of chiefs before constructing houses of worship. Christian education must be taught in all public schools, but private schools can make their own arrangements.

== Ethiopia ==
The constitution of Ethiopia codifies the separation of religion and the state, establishes freedom of religious choice, prohibits religious discrimination, and stipulates that the government will not interfere in the practice of any religion.

Religious groups must register with the government to obtain legal status, which grants them the right to congregate in public and to request land from the government for the construction of religious buildings and cemeteries.

Religious instruction is not allowed in public or private schools. However, a separate category of religious schools are allowed to provide religious instruction.

There have been isolated incidents of violence between religious groups.

Political parties based on religious denominations are not allowed.

== Gabon ==
The constitution of Gabon prohibits religious discrimination and provides for the freedom of religion and equality for all, irrespective of religious belief. It grants religious groups autonomy and the right to provide religious instruction.

Public schools are secular and do not provide religious instruction. Muslim, Catholic, and Protestant groups operate primary and secondary schools, in which representatives of religious groups give religious instruction. These schools must register with the Ministry of Education (Gabon), which ensures they meet the same standards as public schools.

== The Gambia ==
The constitution of the Gambia guarantees and protects the freedom of religion in Articles 17, 25, 32, 33, and 212. Article 60 of the constitution prohibits forming political parties that are formed on a religious basis.

The Supreme Islamic Council is an independent body that advises the government on religious issues. Although not represented on the council, the government provides the council with substantial funding. In the past, the country's president has served as the minister of religious affairs and maintained a formal relationship with the council.

The constitution establishes Qadi courts, with Muslim judges trained in the Islamic legal tradition for matters pertaining to marriage, divorce, child custody, and inheritance for Muslims. The Qadi courts are located in each of the country's seven regions. Muslim law also applies to interfaith couples where there is one Muslim spouse. Non-Qadi district tribunals, which deal with issues under the customary and traditional law, apply sharia, if relevant when presiding over cases involving Muslims. A five-member Qadi panel has purview over appeals regarding decisions of the Qadi courts and non-Qadi district tribunals relating to sharia.

Foreign missionary groups have operated in the country. The government does not require religious groups to register. Faith-based nongovernmental organizations (NGOs) must meet the same registration and licensing requirements as other NGOs.

== Ghana ==
The constitution of Ghana prohibits religious discrimination and stipulates individuals are free to profess and practice their religion. Registration is required for religious groups to have legal status.

Ghanaian society is very tolerant of differences in religion. However, in the past, religious dress codes, particularly those pertaining to women wearing hijabs, have been enforced in publicly funded Christian and Muslim schools, despite a directive from the Ministry of Education that would prohibit such dress codes.

== Guinea ==
The constitution of Guinea establishes that Guinea is a secular state where all enjoy equality before the law, regardless of religion. The constitution provides for the right of individuals to choose, change, and practice the religion of their choice.

After a military coup d’état in September 2021, the National Committee for Reconciliation and Development (CNRD) suspended the constitution, putting a Transition Charter in place stating that the country is a secular state, and provides for freedom of worship.

Religious groups may not own radio or television stations.

The primary school curriculum does not include religious studies.

=== Pre-2021 ===
The imams and administrative staff of the principal mosque in the capital city of Conakry, and the principal mosques in the main cities of the four regions, are government employees. These mosques are directly under the administration of the government.

The Guinean government's Secretariat of Religious Affairs aims to promote better relations among religious denominations and ameliorate interethnic tensions. The secretary general of religious affairs appoints six national directors to lead the offices of Christian affairs, Islamic affairs, pilgrimages, places of worship, economic affairs and the endowment, and general inspector.

In some parts of Guinea, strong familial, communal, cultural, social, or economic pressure discourage conversion from Islam. It has been reported that in the town of Dinguiraye, a holy city for African Muslims, public celebration of non-Muslim religious holidays or festivals are not permitted. Dinguiraye town authorities have also refused permission to build a church within its boundaries.

Members of the Baháʼí Faith have reported that they are discriminated against and shunned by their families because of their religious beliefs.

There were 3 days of ethno-religious fighting in the city of Nzerekore in July 2013. Fighting between ethnic Kpelle, who are Christian or animist, and ethnic Konianke, who are Muslims and close to the larger Malinke ethnic group, left at least 54 dead. The violence ended after the military of Guinea imposed a curfew, and President Condé made a televised appeal for calm.

== Guinea-Bissau ==
The constitution of Guinea-Bissau establishes the separation of religion and state and the responsibility of the state to respect and protect legally recognized religious groups.

In accordance with the constitution, there is no religious instruction in public schools; there are some private schools operated by religious groups.

== Ivory Coast ==
The constitution of Ivory Coast calls for a secular state, although this is not interpreted as strict separation of church and state. Officials often attend religious ceremonies as representatives of the state, and some mission schools receive government aid. Missionaries are generally welcomed throughout the nation. The constitution also prohibits religious discrimination in employment, and emphasizes religious tolerance as central to the Ivory Coast's national unity.

The government supervises and funds pilgrimages for Muslims (to go to Mecca for Hajj) and for Christians (to go to France, Israel, and local religious sites for African Christian churches), although some have been suspended due to Covid.

== Kenya ==
=== Legal framework ===
The constitution of Kenya and other laws and policies prohibit religious discrimination and protect religious freedom, including the freedom to practice any religion or belief. For certain civil cases, such as marriage, divorce, and inheritance, where all parties involved are Muslim, the constitution provides for special qadi courts to adjudicate based on Islamic law; the country's secular High Court has jurisdiction over civil or criminal proceedings, including those in the qadi courts, and accepts appeals of any qadi court decision.

All public schools have religious education classes taught by government-funded teachers. The national curriculum mandates religious classes, and students may not opt out. Some public schools offer different options for religious education, usually Christian or Islamic studies, but they are not required to offer both.

=== Treatment of Muslims ===
Human rights and Muslim religious organizations stated that certain Muslim communities, especially ethnic Somalis, have been the target of government-directed extrajudicial killings, enforced disappearances, torture, and arbitrary arrest and detention. A December 2016 report by a Mombasa-based human rights organization documented 81 extrajudicial killings and disappearances of Muslims from the coastal region over a five-year period. The government denied directing such actions. Ethnic Somali and other Muslim communities reported difficulties in obtaining government-mandated identification documents, citing heightened requirements for Muslim communities.

=== Societal attitudes ===
Atheism is greatly stigmatized in Kenya.

Muslim minority groups, particularly those of Somali descent, reportedly continued to be harassed by non-Muslims. There were reports of religiously motivated threats of societal violence and intolerance, such as Muslim communities threatening individuals who converted from Islam to Christianity.

=== Incidents ===
On October 17, 2017, authorities in the coastal city of Malindi in Kilifi County charged Christian televangelist Paul Makenzi and his wife with radicalizing children.

In the same year, according to religious leaders, some Muslim youths responded to alleged abuses by non-Muslim members of the police who came from other regions by vandalizing properties of local Christians.

In 2017, the Somalia-based terrorist group Al-Shabaab carried out attacks in Mandera, Wajir, Garissa, and Lamu Counties and said it had targeted non-Muslims because of their faith.

== Lesotho ==
The constitution of Lesotho prohibits religious discrimination and provides for freedom of conscience, thought, and religion, including the freedom to change religion or belief and to manifest and propagate one's religion. The government provides extensive support for schools operated by religious groups, including paying and certifying all teachers.

== Liberia ==
The constitution of Liberia provides for the separation of religion and state and stipulates all persons are entitled to freedom of thought, conscience, and religion, except as required by law to protect public safety, order, health, or morals, or the rights of others. It also provides for equal protection under the law.

Starting in 2015, there has been a political campaign to pass a constitutional amendment that would name Liberia a "Christian nation". This campaign has been supported by the United People's Party, which is currently an opposition party in the Liberian government.

Businesses are legally required to close on Sunday for municipal street cleaning, which Muslim citizens view as a pretext to force them to observe the Christian sabbath. Requests to make Eid al-Fitr and Eid al-Adha national holidays have been made since 1995, and have not been implemented. Muslims account for roughly 12% of the population of Liberia.

Muslim women have faced obstacles to voter registration, as poll workers have refused to take ID photographs for people wearing a hijab. The Liberia Muslim Women Network reported that this practice persisted despite other types of head coverings (including traditional garments and habits worn by Catholic nuns) being allowed.

== Libya ==
Military situation in Libya on 7 November 2018 Under the control of the Tobruk-led Government and Libyan National Army Under the control of the Government of National Accord and Allies Under the control of the National Salvation Government Controlled by local forces (For a more detailed map, see military situation in the Libyan Civil War)

The Libyan interim Constitutional Declaration of 2011 states that Islam is the state religion and that Sharia is the principal source of legislation. It accords Christians and Jews the freedom to practice their religion and bans discrimination based on religion. The internationally recognized Government of National Accord (GNA) does not control several regions of the country, and does not have the ability to enforce its laws there.

Libya has a restrictive social environment, including efforts designed to prevent women from traveling alone outside the country. The RADA Special Deterrence Forces (RADA-SDF), a religious police force aligned with the GNA, was involved in the arrests of several individuals whom it accused of violating Islamic law. In Tripoli some militias reportedly imposed restrictions on women's dress and movement, and punished men for behavior they deemed to be “un-Islamic.” The RADA-SDF has also been accused of deliberately destroying Sufi shrines during military clashses, although it denies these claims.

=== Tobruk Government ===
There have been reports the military governor aligned with the Tobruk government and the Libyan National Army increased restrictions on the movement of women without male guardians.

=== Extremist militias ===
Since May 2016, the Islamic State of Iraq and the Levant has lost all significant territory that it held in Libya. Mass graves of executed Coptic Christians have been found in areas previously held by the Islamic State. Sporadic violence by extremist militias against Christians and Sufis have occurred since then, although the culprits have sometimes gone unidentified.

== Madagascar ==
The constitution of Madagascar provides for the freedoms of religious thought and expression and prohibits religious discrimination in the workplace. Other laws protect individual religious freedom against abuses by government or private actors.

In 2021, the leader of a Muslim organization publicly criticized the government after new school exam dates coincided with the Eid al-Adha holiday; Muslim community leaders have also criticized Madagascar's naturalization process as disproportionately barring Muslims from citizenship.

The government's inconsistent enforcement of labor laws, particularly the provision that workers are entitled to at least one 24-hour break from work per week, has led to workers sometimes being forced to miss religious services.

In April 2017 the minister of education threatened to close 16 Islamic schools he classified as “Quranic,” stating the schools were among 190 private schools identified as not complying with various administrative requirements; representatives of the Muslim community criticized this declaration as Islamophobic.

== Malawi ==
The constitution of Malawi prohibits discrimination based on religion and provides for freedom of conscience, religion, belief, and thought; it also specifies that eliminating religious intolerance is a goal of education in Malawi.

In the past, religious pluralism has been enshrined by Malawi society, and members of Christian, Muslim, and Hindu faiths regularly engage in business and civil society together.

Religious instruction is mandatory in public primary schools, with no opt-out provision, and is available as an elective in public secondary schools. In some schools, the religious curriculum is a Christian-oriented “Bible knowledge” course, while in others it is an interfaith “moral and religious education” course drawing from the Christian, Islamic, Hindu, and Baháʼí faiths. According to the law, local school management committees, elected at parent-teacher association meetings, decide on which religious curriculum to use. Private Christian and Islamic schools offer religious instruction in their respective faiths. Hybrid “grant-aided” schools are managed by private, usually religious, institutions, but their teaching staffs are paid by the government. In exchange for this financial support, the government chooses a significant portion of the students who attend. At grant-aided schools, a board appointed by the school's operators decides whether the “Bible knowledge” or the “moral and religious education” curriculum will be used.

Rastafarian children face obstacles to obtaining education, as school children in Malawi are generally required to shave their heads, and Rastafarian religious practice requires them to wear dreadlocks. This has resulted in several Rastafarian children being denied access to public schools, although the majority concede to shaving their heads and complying with the school's rules. In 2020, the High Court Of Malawi issued an injunction compelling the Ministry of Education to enroll all Rastafarian children in school; this was completed by the end of 2021.

== Mauritania ==
Freedom of religion in Mauritania is limited by the government. The constitution establishes the country as an Islamic republic and decrees that Islam is the religion of its citizens and the State. In April 2018, the National Assembly passed a law making the death penalty mandatory for "blasphemy" and apostacy; however by the end of 2021, this penalty had not been applied.

Non-Muslim resident expatriates and a few non-Muslim citizens practice their religion openly with certain limitations against proselytizing to Muslims and transmitting religious materials. Almost all of the population are practicing Sunni Muslims, although there are a few non-Muslims. Roman Catholic and non-denominational Christian churches have been established in Nouakchott, Atar, Zouerate, Nouadhibou, and Rosso. A number of expatriates practice Judaism but there are no synagogues.

A new law in 2021 has made it easier for religious NGOs to register with the Ministry of the Interior; however, they must agree to refrain from proselytizing.

== Mauritius ==
The constitution of Mauritius prohibits discrimination on religious grounds and provides for freedom to practice or change one's religion. The government provides money to the Roman Catholic Church, Church of England, Presbyterian Church of Mauritius, Seventh-day Adventists, Hindus, and Muslims according to their numbers in the census in addition to tax-exempt status. Other religious groups can register and be tax-exempt but receive no subsidy.

Religious education is allowed in public and private schools, at both the primary and high school levels. Students are permitted to opt out, and civic education classes are provided for non-Catholic students attending Catholic schools.

Non-Hindus have often stated they were underrepresented in government. There are no reliable statistics available on the numbers of members of different religious groups represented in the civil service; however, the Truth and Justice Commission had stated in its latest report in 2011 that employment in the civil service did not represent national ethnoreligious diversity.

There is tension between Hindus and Muslims in Mauritius. In the past, police investigations have revealed that some alleged cases of interreligious violence were in fact cases of retaliation stemming from domestic or personal issues.

== Morocco ==
The state religion of Morocco is Islam. The government plays an active role in determining and policing religious practice for Muslims, and disrespecting Islam in public can carry punishments in the forms of fines and imprisonment.

Sunni Islam and Judaism are the only religions recognized by the Moroccan constitution as native to the country, with all other religions being considered "foreign". While foreigners can generally practice their religion in peace, citizens who practice "foreign religions" face obstacles from the government and social pressure. In particular, Shia Muslims and members of the Baháʼí Faith face discrimination from the government, as do some Christian groups. In 2022 there were no Shia mosques in the country.

Historically, Morocco has oscillated between periods of religious tolerance and intolerance. From the Muslim conquest of the Maghreb in 698 through the reign Almoravid dynasty in the 11th and 12th centuries, the region experienced a period of significant religious tolerance; Jews and Christians were required to pay special taxes, but otherwise were allowed to practice their religions in peace, allowing for the flourishing of a Jewish Golden Age. The following Almohad Caliphate instituted harsh religious rule, and forced all non-Muslims to convert on pain of death. Later dynasties reinstated policies of religious tolerance, allowing Jews and Christians to return to the country, although these later dynasties were also sometimes marked by the persecution of religious minorities, either by the government or by violent mobs. During World War II, Morocco fell under the Nazi-backed Vichy Regime, which attempted to deport the Jewish population to concentration camps. This attempt was blocked by Mohammed V of Morocco, although other anti-Jewish laws were successfully passed. Following independence in 1956, Morocco established a constitution which re-established Islam as a state religion, and nominally provides for the freedom of religion, although as mentioned above, discrimination against certain minority groups continues to the present day.

== Namibia ==
The constitution of Namibia prohibits religious discrimination and provides for freedom of belief and the right to practice, profess, and promote any religion. Religious groups have commented on some difficulties in obtaining work visas for foreign religious workers; however, they also noted that all organizations were subject to strict visa enforcement and this policy was not targeted at religious groups in particular. In previous years, the Namibian Islamic Judicial Council reported that Muslims were targeted for deportation for working without valid visas.

Religious groups are allowed to establish private schools provided that no student is denied admission based on creed. The government school curriculum contains a nonsectarian “religious and moral education” component that includes education on moral principles and human rights and introduces students to a variety of African traditions and religions, as well as world religions such as Judaism, Christianity, Islam, Buddhism, Hinduism, the Baháʼí Faith, and Rastafari.

== Niger ==
Freedom of religion for individuals is generally respected in Niger, with the government providing some oversight for the Muslim community. The constitution of Niger prohibits religious discrimination and provides for freedom of religion and worship consistent with public order, social peace, and national unity. It provides for the separation of state and religion and prohibits religiously affiliated political parties.

The government prohibits full-face veils in Diffa Region under state of emergency provisions to prevent concealment of bombs and weapons. The government also prohibits open-air, public proselytization events due to stated safety concerns.

In 2017 the government created an Islamic Forum of more than 50 Islamic organizations, with the goal of standardizing the practice of Islam in Niger and preventing the use of Islamic institutions to spread Islamic extremism.

The establishment of any private school by a religious association must be approved by various government bodies. Private madrasas, established uniquely to teach the Quran without providing other education, are unregulated. Mainstream public schools do not include religious education. The government funds a small number of special primary schools (called “French and Arabic Schools”) that include Muslim religious study as part of the curriculum.

The Muslim and Christian communities in Niger generally have good relations, although a minority of people reject the idea of close ties.

== Nigeria ==
Nigeria is nearly equally divided between Christianity and Islam, though the exact ratio is uncertain. There is also a growing population of non-religious Nigerians who accounted for the remaining 5 percent. The majority of Nigerian Muslims are Sunni and are concentrated in the northern region of the country, while Christians dominate in the south.

Nigeria allows freedom of religion. Islam and Christianity are the two major religions. 12 states in Nigeria use a sharia-based penal code, which can include penalties for apostasy. Religious persecution is largely carried out by groups not affiliated with the Nigerian government, such as Boko Haram. There is a great stigma attached to being an atheist.

== Republic of the Congo ==
The constitution of the Republic of the Congo states that the Republic of the Congo is secular, prohibits religious discrimination, provides for freedom of religion, bans the use of religion for political ends, and stipulates impositions on freedom of conscience stemming from “religious fanaticism” shall be punishable by law.

A government decree bans individuals from wearing full-face Islamic veils in public. This decree, which was established in 2015, received broad support from religious leaders and the general population, including Muslims.

The law prohibits religious instruction in public schools. Private schools may provide religious instruction. The law requires that all public and private schools respect all philosophical and religious doctrines. The constitution protects the right to establish private schools.

== Rwanda ==
The constitution of Rwanda and other laws prohibit religious discrimination and provide for freedom of religion and worship, as well as barring political parties which are based on religious affiliation. Rwanda. New public servants are required by law to take an oath of loyalty “in the name of God almighty” and touch the flag while reciting the oath. Those who do not fulfill the requirement forfeit their position. The law does not make accommodations for religious minorities whose faith does not permit them to comply with this requirement. Jehovah's Witnesses faced sporadic issues with not being able to join the Bar Association due to the oath requirement, as well as being asked to participate in military activities.

The government subsidizes some schools affiliated with different religious groups. A presidential order guarantees students attending any government-subsidized school the right to worship according to their beliefs during the school day, as long as their religious groups are registered in the country and the students’ worship practices do not interfere with learning and teaching activities. Students in public primary school and the first three years of secondary school must study a class on world religions, ethics, and citizenship.

In 2017, two attacks on members of a Pentecostal church in the Huye District of Southern Province were reported. One day after six church members were attacked and severely beaten (leaving one in a coma as a result), an armed mob attacked the church at night, injuring 25 church members.

In 2016 there were reports of Muslims and Muslim community leaders being targeted for arrest or attacked.

== São Tomé and Príncipe ==
The constitution of São Tomé and Príncipe provides for freedom of religion and worship and equality for all, irrespective of religious belief. It grants religious groups autonomy in and the right to teach their religion; although religious groups must register with the government. Religious education can be offered in public schools, but normally is not taught there. There are two schools run by Christian groups, and their religious classes are open to everyone.

== Senegal ==
The constitution of Senegal provides for the free practice of religious beliefs and self-governance by religious groups in Senegal without government interference. By law all faith-based organizations must register with the government to acquire legal status as an association, and the government monitors groups to ensure that they operate within the terms of their registration, particularly when working in the areas of child protection and social development.

In the past, the government has maintained programs to assist religious groups to maintain places of worship, to fund and facilitate participation in the Hajj, and to fund schools operated by religious groups.

Muslims may choose either the civil family code or Sharia to adjudicate family conflicts, such as marriage and inheritance disputes. Civil court judges preside over civil and customary law cases, but religious leaders informally settle many disputes among Muslims, particularly in rural areas.

By law religious education may be proposed in public and private schools, and parents have the option to enroll their children in a Christian or Islamic program, or no religious education.

== Seychelles ==
The constitution of Seychelles prohibits all forms of discrimination and provides for the freedom of religion. Religious groups are barred from owning radio or television stations, but larger religious groups are given programming time on state radio.

Compulsory religious education in schools is against the law. Nevertheless, non-Catholic students at Catholic schools were not provided with alternative activities during religious lessons.

In the past, the government has offered financial assistance to religious organizations for the purpose of repairing religious buildings.

== Sierra Leone ==
The constitution of Sierra Leone provides for the freedom of conscience and thus for freedom of religion. Laws in Sierra Leone prohibit discrimination on religious grounds, and safeguard the right of citizens to change religions.

The Rastafari community in Sierra Leone has faced obstructions from the police and government of Sierra Leone, as cannabis, which plays an important role in Rastafari religious practice, is illegal in Sierra Leone.

=== Societal attitudes ===
Intermarriage between religious groups is common in Sierra Leone, and many families have members of more than one religion. In the past religious leaders have raised concerns about polemical and aggressive proselytization by Christian and Muslim fundamentalist groups, which have been further characterized as a foreign influence.

== Somalia ==
Current (December 2024) political and military control in ongoing Somali Civil War (2009–present)

Due to the Somali Civil War, the enforcement of laws pertaining to religion by the various autonomous governments in the region is inconsistent.

Sunni Islam is the state religion in Somalia. Generally, the judiciary in most areas relies on xeer (traditional and customary law), sharia, and the penal code. In many regions, activity by Salafi groups further restricts religious freedom, as individuals are afraid of reprisal.

Islam has been a core part of Somali national identity for the entirety of its modern history. A 1961 constitution established Islam as the state religion, and later governments have maintained this policy. The Somali Democratic Republic, which existed from 1969 to 1991, propagated an ideology merging elements of Islam and Marxism. Following the collapse of this government, Somalia has experienced a prolonged civil war which has continued on and off since the 1990s. The official transitional national government has continued to uphold Islam as the state religion, and further established that the Somali legal code is based on principles of Islamic law. The region of Somaliland, which seceded at the outset of the civil war and remains nominally independent but internationally unrecognized, has established its own constitution founded on similar religious precepts. Activity by various Islamist insurgent groups further limits religious freedom, as individuals who do not comply with these groups' interpretations of Islamic law are targeted for reprisals.

=== Al-Shabaab ===
Al-Shabaab, an al-Qaeda-affiliated militant group in Somalia, killed, maimed, or harassed persons suspected of converting from Islam or those who failed to adhere to the group's religious edicts. Fear of reprisals from al-Shabaab often prevented religious groups from operating freely. In the past Al-Shabaab reportedly threatened to close mosques in areas it controlled if the mosques’ teachings did not conform to the group's interpretation of Islam.

=== Societal attitudes ===
There is a strong societal pressure to adhere to Sunni traditions. Conversion from Islam to another religion has been socially unacceptable in all areas of Somalia and is illegal in some parts of the country. Those suspected of conversion face harassment by members of their community. According to the federal Ministry of Religious Affairs, more than 99 percent of the population is Sunni Muslim. Members of other religious groups combined constitute less than 1 percent of the population and include a small Christian community, a small Sufi Muslim community, and an unknown number of Shia Muslims. Immigrants and foreign workers, who are mainly from East African countries, belong mainly to other religious groups.

In the early 2020s, the only place that non-Muslims can worship publicly in is at the international airport compound.

== South Africa ==
South Africa is a secular democracy with freedom of religion guaranteed by its constitution. Pursuant to Section 9 of the Constitution, the Equality Act of 2000 prohibits unfair discrimination on various grounds including religion. The Equality Act does not apply to unfair discrimination in the workplace, which is covered by the Employment Equity Act.

The Witchcraft Suppression Act of 1957 based on colonial witchcraft legislation criminalises claiming a knowledge of witchcraft, conducting specified practices associated with witchcraft including the use of charms and divination, and accusing others of practising witchcraft. In 2007 the South African Law Reform Commission received submissions from the South African Pagan Rights Alliance and the Traditional Healers Organisation requesting the investigation of the constitutionality of the act and on 23 March 2010 the Minister of Justice and Constitutional Development approved a South African Law Reform Commission project to review witchcraft legislation.

== South Sudan ==
The transitional constitution provides for separation of religion and state and freedom to worship and assemble; all religious groups must register with the government.

The 2020 Pew-Templeton Global Religious Futures Project report estimated that people with a Christian background make up 60.5% of the country while followers of indigenous (animist) religions make up 32.9%; 6.2% were Muslims, while there were other small groups of Baha’is, Buddhists, Hindus and Jews. However, population displacement and pastoralists made it difficult to confirm exact figures.

== Sudan ==
The 2019 transitional constitution of Sudan guarantees freedom of religion and omits reference to sharia as a source of law, unlike the 2005 constitution of Sudan's deposed president Omar al-Bashir whose government had outlawed apostasy and blasphemy against Islam. Bashir's government had also targeted Shia Muslims and those engaging in proselytization to faiths other than Islam. Christians had also faced restrictions in matter of religious freedom.

Apostasy from Islam was decriminalized in July 2020, whereas previously those found guilty of apostasy could face the death penalty. However, in 2022, citizens were still being jailed for changing their religious identity. In September 2020, the interim government established the separation of religion and state.

== Tanzania ==
The government of Tanzania and the semiautonomous government of Zanzibar both recognize religious freedom as a principle and make efforts to protect it. The government of Zanzibar appoints Muslim religious officials in Zanzibar. The main body of law in Tanzania and Zanzibar is secular, but Muslims have the option to use religious courts for family-related cases.

Individual cases of religiously motivated violence have occurred against both Christians and Muslims. There are reports of young men in Zanzibar being recruited into organizations such as al-Shabaab and ISIS-M.

The policies and ideology of Ujamaa espoused by Tanzania's first government following independence from the United Kingdom in the 1960s emphasized national unity over religious or ethnic division, and this is reflected by the strong anti-discrimination rhetoric in Tanzania's constitution, which is still in effect as of 2019. While Ujamaa was abandoned as a state project in 1985, and religious discord has risen somewhat since then, academic and NGO sources credit Ujamaa for contributing to a climate of religious freedom and relative social stability in Tanzania.

== Togo ==
The constitution of Togo specifies the state is secular and protects the rights of all citizens of Togo to exercise their religious beliefs, consistent with the nation's laws. Religious groups other than Roman Catholics, Protestants, and Muslims must register with the government; however the government has not accepted new applications since 2013. The constitution prohibits the establishment of political parties based on religion. The law forbids private religious radio stations from broadcasting political material.

The public school curriculum does not include religion classes. There are many Catholic, Protestant, and Islamic schools, to which the government assigns its own paid employees as additional teachers and staff. Other registered religious groups have the right to establish schools as long as they meet accreditation standards.

=== Societal attitudes ===
There is a high degree of religious tolerance in Togolese society. Members of different religious groups regularly invite one another to their respective ceremonies. Marriage between persons of different religious groups remained common.

According to the Directorate of Religious Affairs in the Ministry of Territorial Affairs, disputes continued to occur when new churches established themselves in neighborhoods, particularly those led by religious leaders from Nigeria. Local residents continued to state some of these congregations worshiped too loudly and often late at night, using drums. The MTA received 40 complaints during 2017, nearly all regarding noise, and the ministry stated it sought to resolve them. These complaints reportedly often focused on evangelical Protestant congregations whose services often employ musical instruments and loud praying. This continued into 2022 when the government recommended a noise level of under 55 decibels.

== Tunisia ==
The July 2022 constitution of Tunisia requires the state to support and advance the purposes of Islam, and states that “Tunisia is part of the Islamic Ummah”; it also requires the president to be Muslim.

=== Previous constitution ===
The previous constitution provided for the freedoms of belief, conscience, and religious practice and prohibited the promotion of discrimination, hatred, or violence along religious lines.

The government subsidizes mosques and synagogues, appoints imams, and pays their salaries, and also pays the salary of the grand rabbi. The Grand Mufti is selected by the president. The Ministry of Religious Affairs suggests themes for Friday prayers, but does not regulate their content. The government may initiate administrative and legal procedures to remove imams whom authorities determine to be preaching “divisive” theology.

It is mandatory for students in public schools to attend courses on Islam approximately one hour per week. The curriculum for secondary school students also includes references to the history of Judaism and Christianity. Religious groups may operate private schools.

Provisions of law addressing marriage, divorce, and other personal status issues are largely based on principles of civil law, combined with elements of sharia. Laws of inheritance are principally based on requirements in sharia, but there are some provisions that allow for exceptions as outlined in the Code of Personal Status.

The police in Tunisia have targeted Salafists and others profiled as terrorists with arrests, house searches, and other restrictions. The political party Hizb ut-Tahrir was suspended for one month by a court in Tunis for violating laws against the incitement of religious hatred and for advocating the establishment of a Caliphate. Women who wear a niqāb are also sometimes harassed by police. Members of the Baháʼí Faith have also faced harassment by government officials, and the faith is not recognized by the government, although they are allowed to practice their religion in private. Jews and Christians are allowed to practice their religion in authorized houses of worship.

In September 2017, the government abolished a law prohibiting Muslim women from marrying non-Muslim men.

=== Societal attitudes ===
Christian converts from Islam and atheists reported threats of violence and societal pressure to conceal their faith.

=== Incidents ===
In June 2017, during Ramadan, police arrested five individuals in Bizerte, who were subsequently sentenced to one month in prison for public indecency for eating or smoking in public during the daytime. The arrests were followed by protests calling for the individuals' release. The governor and Tunis and the minister of the interior also condemned the arrests

In October 2017, the government approved the establishment of the openly atheist organization, the Tunisian Council of Secularism.

== Uganda ==
The constitution of Uganda stipulates there shall be no state religion and bans the creation of political parties based on religion. It provides for freedom of belief and prohibits religious discrimination. The government requires religious groups to register.

In the past the government has restricted the activities of religious groups that it has defined as "cults", and also has arrested some individuals who refused to participate in vaccination initiatives for religious reasons.

According to the Uganda Muslim Supreme Council, the government has discriminated against Muslims when hiring government officials, and by appointing Christian teachers to lead Muslim public schools.

Primary schools must teach either Christianity, Islam, or both, while religious education in public secondary schools is optional; most students in Uganda attend schools run by religious organizations.

=== Incidents ===
In December 2016, the Uganda Police Force raided two Salafi mosques in Kampala and arrested fourteen individuals for suspected involvement in the November 2016 killing of Sheikh Mohammed Kigundu, a Muslim cleric. The suspects were released in January 2017, and the police force apologized to the Muslim community, saying that it had acted on false intelligence.

== Zambia ==
The constitution of Zambia establishes Zambia as a Christian nation but also provides for religious freedom and freedom of conscience; it also prohibits religious discrimination.

In the past, some religious groups within Zambia criticized ex-President Edgar Lungu's government for "blurring the line between church and state" and showing religious favoritism to Christians. As of 2017, new registration requirements for religious groups were criticized as excessively bureaucratic, and resulted in difficulties for smaller religious groups, and resulted in at least one denial of entry and one deportation; by 2022 there had been a 3-year moratorium in registrations.

Religious groups are allowed to establish private schools and provide religious instruction to members of their religious communities. The government requires religious instruction in all schools from grades one through nine. Students may request education in their religion and may opt out of religious instruction only if the school is not able to accommodate their request. Religious education after grade nine is optional and is not offered at all schools. The religious curriculum focuses on Christian teachings but also incorporates comparative studies of Islam, Hinduism, and traditional beliefs.

=== Societal attitudes ===
Several mob attacks against those suspected of witchcraft occurred in 2017 and 2022. Victims were usually elderly, and incidents often resulted in the violent death of the accused.

In the past, some religious leaders from non-Christian communities, such as the Baháʼí Faith and Messianic Jewish communities, have expressed concerns that Christian church leaders have repeatedly singled out their religious practice and accused them of being "Satanic".

== Zimbabwe ==
The constitution of Zimbabwe prohibits religious discrimination and guarantees the freedom of religion and practice in Zimbabwe.

The government does not require religious groups to register; however, religious groups operating schools or medical facilities must register those institutions with the appropriate ministry. Religious groups as well as schools and medical facilities run by religious groups may receive tax-exempt status.

The government of Zimbabwe has on several occasions in 2017 arrested religious leaders and disrupted or prohibited religious gatherings which were perceived to be critical of the government. Arrests and fines continued in 2022.

The Ministry of Primary and Secondary Education (MPSE) sets curricula for public primary and secondary schools. Many public primary schools require a religious education course focusing on Christianity but covering other religious groups, emphasizing religious tolerance. There is no provision for opting out of religious instruction courses at the primary level. Students are able to opt out at the secondary level beginning at age 14, when they begin to choose their courses. The government does not regulate religious education in private schools but must approve employment of headmasters and teachers at those schools.
