= Catholic Church in Equatorial Guinea =

Santa Isabel Cathedral in Malabo

The Catholic Church in Equatorial Guinea is part of the worldwide Catholic Church, under the spiritual leadership of the Pope in Rome.

In 2023 almost 90% of the population are Christian. Of these 71% are Roman Catholics, though there are also a few thousand Protestants.

Equatorial Guinea has one of the highest proportions of Catholics in Africa, a legacy of its status as a former Spanish colony. There are five dioceses, including one archdiocese. Equatorial Guinea consists of a single ecclesiastical province, Malabo, with four suffragan dioceses in Bata, Ebebiyin, Evinayong and Mongomo. The Archdiocese of Malabo has the Archbishop of Malabo as metropolitan archbishop and spiritual leader of the catholic faithful of Equatorial Guinea. The current archbishop of Malabo is Nsue Edjang Mayé, former bishop of Ebebiyin. The emeritus archbishop is Ildefonso Obama Obono.

The bishops are members of the Episcopal Conference of Equatorial Guinea (Conferencia Episcopal de Guinea Ecuatorial). President of the Episcopal Conference is Ildefonso Obama Obono, archbishop of Malabo. Furthermore, the Episcopal Conference is a member of the Association des Conferences Episcopales de l'Afrique Centrale and the Symposium des Conférences Épiscopales d'Afrique et de Madagascar.

On April 1, 2017, the Holy See erected two new dioceses in Equatorial Guinea. The Diocese of Evinayong was erected from territories formerly belonging to the Diocese of Bata and the Diocese of Mongomo was carved out of the current Diocese of Ebebiyin.

On March 29, 2018, Archbishop Julio Murat, the titular archbishop of Orange, was appointed as the Apostolic Nuncio to Equatorial Guinea. He held the post until 9 November, 2022. Archbishop José Avelino Bettencourt was named as the new Apostolic Nuncio on August 30, 2023.

== Archdiocese ==
- Archdiocese of Malabo

=== Dioceses ===
- Diocese of Bata
- Diocese of Ebebiyin
- Diocese of Evinayong
- Diocese of Mongomo

== Nuncios ==
=== Apostolic Pro-Nuncio ===
- Archbishop Luigi Poggi (31 October 1966 - 21 May 1969 later Cardinal)
- Archbishop Ernesto Gallina (July 16, 1969 - March 13, 1971)
- Archbishop Jean Jadot (15 May 1971 - 23 May 1973)
- Archbishop Luciano Storero (30 June 1973 - 14 July 1976)
- Archbishop Giuseppe Uhac (October 7, 1976 - June 3, 1981)
- Archbishop Donato Squicciarini (16 September 1981 - 1 July 1989)
- Archbishop Santos Abril y Castelló (2 October 1989 - 24 February 1996)

=== Apostolic Nuncio ===
- Archbishop Félix del Blanco Prieto (4 May 1996 - 28 June 1996)
- Archbishop Eliseo Antonio Ariotti (17 July 2003 - 5 November 2009)
- Archbishop Piero Pioppo (January 25, 2010 - September 8, 2017)
- Archbishop Julio Murat (March 29, 2018 - November 9, 2022)

== See also ==
- Religion in Equatorial Guinea
- Protestantism in Equatorial Guinea
- Reformed Presbyterian Church of Equatorial Guinea
