= Lists of capital cities =

Below is an index of pages containing lists of capital cities.

== National capitals ==
- List of national capitals
- List of national capitals by latitude
- List of national capitals by population
- List of national capitals by area
- List of capital cities by elevation
- List of national capitals serving as administrative divisions
- List of former national capitals
- List of countries whose capital is not their largest city
- List of purpose-built national capitals
- List of national capitals situated on an international border
- List of national capitals in East, South, and Southeast Asia

== Subnational capitals ==
- List of capitals outside the territories they serve
- List of purpose-built capitals of country subdivisions

=== Countries ===
- List of capitals in Antigua and Barbuda
- List of capitals in Australia
- List of capitals of subdivisions of Brazil
- List of capitals in China
- List of state and union territory capitals in India
- List of capitals in Japan
- List of capitals in Malaysia
- List of capitals of states of Mexico
- List of capitals in Pakistan
- List of capitals in South Korea
- List of capitals in the United States
- List of capitals in Russia
