= List of national capitals by latitude =

This is a list of official national capitals by latitude, including territories and dependencies, non-sovereign states including associated states and entities whose sovereignty is disputed. Sovereign states are shown in bold text.

Latitude ("−" indicates southern hemi- sphere)	City	Country	Notes
−0.25	Quito	**Ecuador**	Highest official capital.
0.3	Kampala	**Uganda**	
0.33	São Tomé	**São Tomé and Príncipe**	
0.38	Libreville	**Gabon**	
−0.53	Yaren (de facto)	**Nauru**	Country does not have an official capital; however, the government offices are in Yaren.
−1.28	Nairobi	**Kenya**	
1.28	Singapore	**Singapore**	Island City-state
1.43	Tarawa	**Kiribati**	
−1.93	Kigali	**Rwanda**	
2.03	Mogadishu	**Somalia**	
3.13	Kuala Lumpur (official, legislative and royal) Putrajaya (administrative and judicial)	**Malaysia**	
−3.43	Gitega	**Burundi**	
3.75	Malabo	**Equatorial Guinea**	
3.87	Yaoundé	**Cameroon**	
4.17	Malé	**Maldives**	
−4.27	Brazzaville	**Republic of the Congo**	
−4.32	Kinshasa	**Democratic Republic of the Congo**	
4.37	Bangui	**Central African Republic**	
4.58	Bogotá	**Colombia**	
−4.62	Victoria	**Seychelles**	
4.85	Juba	**South Sudan**	
4.88	Bandar Seri Begawan	**Brunei**	
4.92	Cayenne	French Guiana	Overseas department of France
5.55	Accra	**Ghana**	
5.87	Paramaribo	**Suriname**	
6.12	Lomé	**Togo**	
−6.17	Dodoma (official) Dar es Salaam (former capital; some government offices remaining)	**Tanzania**	
−6.2	Jakarta	**Indonesia**	
6.3	Monrovia	**Liberia**	
6.48	Porto-Novo (official) Cotonou (de facto)	**Benin**	
6.8	Georgetown	**Guyana**	
6.82	Yamoussoukro (official) Abidjan (former capital; still has many government offices)	**Ivory Coast**	
6.9	Sri Jayawardenepura Kotte (official) Colombo (former capital; has some government offices)	**Sri Lanka**	Also known as "Kotte". Until the 1980s, the capital was Colombo, where many important governmental institutions still remain and which is still designated as the commercial capital of Sri Lanka.
6.92	Palikir	**Federated States of Micronesia**	
7.07	Majuro	**Marshall Islands**	
7.48	Ngerulmud	**Palau**	
−7.92	Georgetown	Ascension Island	Part of the British Overseas Territory of Saint Helena, Ascension and Tristan da Cunha
8.48	Freetown	**Sierra Leone**	
−8.52	Funafuti	**Tuvalu**	Easternmost capital of an independent sovereign state in the world.
−8.57	Dili	**East Timor (Timor-Leste)**	
−8.83	Luanda	**Angola**	
8.98	Panama City	**Panama**	
9.02	Addis Ababa	**Ethiopia**	
9.07	Abuja	**Nigeria**	
−9.43	Honiara	**Solomon Islands**	
−9.5	Port Moresby	**Papua New Guinea**	
9.52	Conakry	**Guinea**	
9.93	San José	**Costa Rica**	
10	Hargeisa	Somaliland	De facto independent state not diplomatically recognized by any other state, claimed in whole by the Somali Republic.
−10.42	Flying Fish Cove	Christmas Island	External territory of Australia
10.5	Caracas	**Venezuela**	
10.67	Port of Spain	**Trinidad and Tobago**	
11.55	Phnom Penh	**Cambodia**	
11.58	Djibouti	**Djibouti**	
−11.68	Moroni	**Comoros**	
11.85	Bissau	**Guinea-Bissau**	
−12.03	Lima	**Peru**	
12.05	St. George's	**Grenada**	
12.1	N'Djamena	**Chad**	
12.12	Willemstad	Curaçao	Self-governing part of the Kingdom of the Netherlands
12.13	Managua	**Nicaragua**	
−12.18	West Island	Cocos (Keeling) Islands	External territory of Australia
12.35	Ouagadougou	**Burkina Faso**	
12.52	Oranjestad	Aruba	Self-governing part of the Kingdom of the Netherlands
12.65	Bamako	**Mali**	
13.1	Bridgetown	**Barbados**	
13.15	Kingstown	**Saint Vincent and the Grenadines**	
−13.28	Mata-Utu	Wallis and Futuna	Overseas collectivity of France
13.45	Banjul	**Gambia**	
13.47	Hagåtña	Guam	Territory of the United States
13.52	Niamey	**Niger**	
13.68	San Salvador	**El Salvador**	
13.75	Bangkok	**Thailand**	
−13.83	Apia	**Samoa**	
−13.98	Lilongwe	**Malawi**	
14.02	Castries	**Saint Lucia**	
14.1	Tegucigalpa	**Honduras**	
−14.27	Pago Pago	American Samoa	Territory of the United States
14.58	Manila	**Philippines**	
14.6	Guatemala City	**Guatemala**	
14.68	Dakar	**Senegal**	
14.92	Praia	**Cape Verde**	
15.17	Saipan	Northern Mariana Islands	Territory of the United States
15.3	Roseau	**Dominica**	
15.33	Asmara	**Eritrea**	
15.33	Sana'a	**Yemen**	
−15.42	Lusaka	**Zambia**	
15.63	Khartoum	**Sudan**	
−15.78	Brasília	**Brazil**	
−15.92	Jamestown	Saint Helena, Ascension and Tristan da Cunha	British Overseas Territory
−16.5	Sucre (constitutional) La Paz (administrative)	**Bolivia**	La Paz is the highest administrative capital, higher than Quito.
16.7	Plymouth (official) Brades (de facto)	Montserrat	British Overseas Territory. Plymouth was abandoned after the eruption of the Soufriere Hills volcano in 1997. Government offices since then have been moved to Brades Estate, which is in the northwestern part of Montserrat.
17.12	St. John's	**Antigua and Barbuda**	
17.25	Belmopan	**Belize**	
17.3	Basseterre	**Saint Kitts and Nevis**	
−17.53	Papeete	French Polynesia	Overseas collectivity of France
−17.75	Port Vila	**Vanuatu**	
−17.85	Harare	**Zimbabwe**	
17.88	Gustavia	Saint Barthélemy	Overseas collectivity of France
17.97	Vientiane	**Laos**	
17.98	Kingston	**Jamaica**	
18.02	Philipsburg	Sint Maarten	Self-governing part of the Kingdom of the Netherlands
18.07	Marigot	Saint Martin	Overseas collectivity of France
18.1	Nouakchott	**Mauritania**	
−18.13	Suva	**Fiji**	
18.22	The Valley	Anguilla	British Overseas Territory
18.35	Charlotte Amalie	United States Virgin Islands	Territory of the United States
18.42	Road Town	British Virgin Islands	British Overseas Territory
18.45	San Juan	Puerto Rico	Territory of the United States
18.47	Santo Domingo	**Dominican Republic**	
18.53	Port-au-Prince	**Haiti**	
−18.93	Antananarivo	**Madagascar**	
−19.07	Alofi	Niue	Self-governing in free association with New Zealand
19.3	George Town	Cayman Islands	British Overseas Territory
19.43	Mexico City	**Mexico**	
19.75	Naypyidaw	**Myanmar**	
−20.15	Port Louis	**Mauritius**	
21.03	Hanoi	**Vietnam**	
−21.13	Nukuʻalofa	**Tonga**	Westernmost capital of an independent sovereign state in the world.
−21.2	Avarua	Cook Islands	Self-governing in free association with New Zealand.
22.18	Victoria	Hong Kong	Special Administrative Region of China
−22.27	Nouméa	New Caledonia	Sui generis collectivity of France
−22.57	Windhoek	**Namibia**	
23.13	Havana	**Cuba**	
23.6	Muscat	**Oman**	
23.73	Dhaka	**Bangladesh**	
24.47	Abu Dhabi	**United Arab Emirates**	
24.63	Riyadh	**Saudi Arabia**	
−24.65	Gaborone	**Botswana**	
25.03	Taipei	Taiwan	Officially the Republic of China (ROC), it has been competing for recognition with the People's Republic of China (PRC) as the sole Chinese government since 1949. Taiwan controls the island of Taiwan and its associated islands, Quemoy, Matsu, the Pratas, and part of the Spratly Islands The territory of Taiwan is claimed in whole by China. The Republic of China participates in the World Health Organization and a number of non-UN international organizations such as the World Trade Organization, International Olympic Committee and others under a variety of pseudonyms, most commonly Chinese Taipei.
−25.07	Adamstown	Pitcairn Islands	British Overseas Territory
25.07	Nassau	**Bahamas**	
−25.27	Asunción	**Paraguay**	
25.28	Doha	**Qatar**	
−25.73	Pretoria (executive)	**South Africa**	
−25.97	Maputo	**Mozambique**	
26.22	Manama	**Bahrain**	
−26.32	Mbabane (administrative)	**Eswatini**	
−26.42	Lobamba (royal and legislative)	**Eswatini (Swaziland)**	
27.15	El Aaiún (declared)	Sahrawi Arab Democratic Republic ^{[c]}	The Sahrawi Republic, recognised by 82 states, claims the mostly Moroccan controlled Western Sahara. Moroccan-controlled territory includes El Aaiún, and Morocco claims all Sahrawi controlled territory. The Sahrawi government resides in exile in Tindouf, Algeria. See Politics of the Sahrawi Arab Democratic Republic.
−27.15	Hanga Roa	Easter Island	Special territory of Chile
27.47	Thimphu	**Bhutan**	
27.7	Kathmandu	**Nepal**	
28.6	New Delhi	**India**	
−29.05	Kingston	Norfolk Island	External territory of Australia
−29.12	Bloemfontein (judicial)	**South Africa**	
−29.3	Maseru	**Lesotho**	
29.37	Kuwait City	**Kuwait**	
30.05	Cairo	**Egypt**	
31.77	Jerusalem	**Israel**	
31.77	Jerusalem (East)	**Palestine**	
31.93	Amman	**Jordan**	
32.28	Hamilton	Bermuda	British Overseas Territory
32.9	Tripoli	**Libya**	
33.33	Baghdad	**Iraq**	
−33.45	Santiago (official) Valparaíso (legislative)	**Chile**	
33.5	Damascus	**Syria**	
33.72	Islamabad	**Pakistan**	
33.88	Beirut	**Lebanon**	
−33.92	Cape Town (legislative)	**South Africa**	
34.03	Rabat	**Morocco**	
34.53	Kabul	**Afghanistan**	
−34.6	Buenos Aires	**Argentina**	
34.67	Episkopi Cantonment	Akrotiri and Dhekelia	British Overseas Territory
−34.88	Montevideo	**Uruguay**	
35.17	Nicosia	**Cyprus**	
35.17	Nicosia	Northern Cyprus	De facto independent state that is recognised only by Turkey. Northern Cyprus is claimed in whole by the Republic of Cyprus.
−35.3	Canberra	**Australia**	
35.68	Tehran	**Iran**	
35.68	Tokyo	**Japan**	
35.88	Valletta	**Malta**	
36.13	Gibraltar	Gibraltar	British Overseas Territory
36.77	Algiers	**Algeria**	
36.8	Tunis	**Tunisia**	
−37.07	Edinburgh of the Seven Seas	Tristan da Cunha	Part of the British Overseas Territory of Saint Helena, Ascension and Tristan da Cunha
37.55	Seoul	**South Korea**	
37.93	Ashgabat	**Turkmenistan**	
37.97	Athens	**Greece**	
38.53	Dushanbe	**Tajikistan**	
38.7	Lisbon	**Portugal**	
38.9	Washington, D.C.	**United States**	
39.02	Pyongyang	**North Korea**	
39.87	Ankara	**Turkey**	
39.9	Beijing	**China**	See also: List of historical capitals of China
40.18	Yerevan	**Armenia**	
40.38	Baku	**Azerbaijan**	
40.38	Madrid	**Spain**	
41.27	Tashkent	**Uzbekistan**	
−41.28	Wellington	**New Zealand**	Southernmost capital of an independent sovereign state in the world.
41.32	Tirana	**Albania**	
41.72	Tbilisi (official)	**Georgia**	
41.9	Rome	**Italy**	
41.9	Vatican City	**Vatican City**	City-state
42	Skopje	**North Macedonia**	
42.23	Tskhinvali	South Ossetia	De facto independent state recognised by Russia, Nicaragua, Nauru, Venezuela, Abkhazia and Transnistria. Claimed in whole by the Republic of Georgia as the Provisional Administrative Entity of South Ossetia.
42.25	Kutaisi (legislative)	**Georgia**	
42.43	Podgorica (official) Cetinje (seat of the President)	**Montenegro**	
42.5	Andorra la Vella	**Andorra**	
42.67	Pristina	Kosovo^{[g]}	De facto independent state that is recognised by 112 UN member states and by Taiwan. Claimed in whole by the Republic of Serbia as part of its Autonomous province of Kosovo and Metohija. The Republic of Kosovo has de facto control over most of the territory, with limited control in North Kosovo.
42.7	Sofia	**Bulgaria**	
42.87	Bishkek	**Kyrgyzstan**	
43	Sokhumi	Abkhazia	De facto independent state recognized by Russia, Nauru, Nicaragua, Venezuela, South Ossetia and Transnistria. Claimed in whole by Republic of Georgia as the Autonomous Republic of Abkhazia.
43.72	Monaco	**Monaco**	City-state
43.87	Sarajevo	**Bosnia and Herzegovina**	
43.93	San Marino	**San Marino**	
44.42	Bucharest	**Romania**	
44.82	Belgrade	**Serbia**	
45.42	Ottawa	**Canada**	
45.82	Zagreb	**Croatia**	
46.05	Ljubljana	**Slovenia**	
46.77	St. Pierre	Saint Pierre and Miquelon	Overseas collectivity of France
46.85	Tiraspol	Transnistria	De facto independent state, not recognized by any UN-member, but by Abkhazia and South Ossetia. Claimed in whole by the Republic of Moldova as the Territorial Unit of Transnistria.
46.95	Bern	**Switzerland**	Switzerland has no capital. Bern is the "Federal City".
47	Chișinău	**Moldova**	
47.13	Vaduz	**Liechtenstein**	
47.47	Budapest	**Hungary**	
47.92	Ulaanbaatar	**Mongolia**	
48.13	Bratislava	**Slovakia**	
48.2	Vienna	**Austria**	
48.35	Strasbourg	European Union	Seat of the European Parliament, Eurocorps, European Ombudsman of the European Union; so also the Council of Europe, European Court of Human Rights, European Directorate for the Quality of Medicines & HealthCare and the European Audiovisual Observatory
48.85	Paris	**France**	
49.18	St. Helier	Jersey	British Crown Dependency
49.45	St. Peter Port	Guernsey	British Crown Dependency
49.6	Luxembourg	**Luxembourg**	
50.08	Prague	**Czech Republic**	
50.45	Kyiv	**Ukraine**	
50.85	Brussels	**Belgium**	Also the de facto capital of the European Union
51.17	Astana	**Kazakhstan**	
51.48	Cardiff	Wales	Constituent country of the United Kingdom
51.5	London	**United Kingdom**	Also the capital of the constituent country of England
−51.68	Stanley	Falkland Islands	British Overseas Territory
52.23	Warsaw	**Poland**	
52.37	Amsterdam	**Netherlands**	The Dutch constitution refers to Amsterdam as the "capital". The Dutch government is located in The Hague. See Capital of the Netherlands.
52.52	Berlin	**Germany**	
53.33	Dublin	**Ireland**	
53.9	Minsk	**Belarus**	
54.13	Douglas	Isle of Man	British Crown Dependency
−54.27	King Edward Point	South Georgia and the South Sandwich Islands	British Overseas Territory
54.60	Belfast	Northern Ireland	Constituent country of the United Kingdom
54.68	Vilnius	**Lithuania**	
55.67	Copenhagen	**Denmark**	
55.76	Moscow	**Russia**	
55.95	Edinburgh	Scotland	Constituent country of the United Kingdom
56.95	Riga	**Latvia**	
59.33	Stockholm	**Sweden**	
59.44	Tallinn	**Estonia**	
59.91	Oslo	**Norway**	
60.1	Mariehamn	Åland	Autonomous region of Finland
60.17	Helsinki	**Finland**	
62.01	Tórshavn	Faroe Islands	Self-governing territory of the Danish Realm
64.15	Reykjavík	**Iceland**	Northernmost capital of an independent sovereign state in the world.
64.18	Nuuk	Greenland	Self-governing territory of the Danish Realm. Northernmost capital of a constituent state in the world.
78.22	Longyearbyen	Svalbard	Longyearbyen is the administrative center of Svalbard, a Norwegian Arctic unincorporated area.

== See also ==
- List of capital cities by elevation
- List of national capitals by population
- List of national capitals by area
