= 45th Pacific Islands Forum =

2014 international conference

- Host country: Palau
- Date: 29 July 2014 – 1 August 2014
- Cities: Ngerulmud; Koror
- Participants: 15 states: Australia; Cook Islands; Kiribati; Marshall Islands; Federated States of Micronesia; Nauru; New Zealand; Niue; Palau; Papua New Guinea; Samoa; Solomon Islands; Tonga; Tuvalu; Vanuatu
- Follows: 44th Pacific Islands Forum
- Precedes: 46th Pacific Islands Forum
- Website: www.forumsec.org

The 45th Pacific Islands Forum was held from 29 July to 1 August 2014 in Palau. The forum's official opening was held in the capital Ngerulmud, in Melekeok State, but the majority of events were held in Koror, Palau's largest city and former capital. The official theme of the meeting was "The Ocean: Life & Future". Topics under discussion include climate change, commercial fishing, non-communicable diseases and the possibility of readmitting Fiji to the forum.

== Overview ==
The Pacific Islands Forum is an inter-governmental organization that aims to enhance cooperation between the independent countries of the Pacific Ocean. It was founded in 1971 as the South Pacific Forum. In 1999, the name was changed; Pacific Islands Forum is more inclusive of the Forum's Oceania-spanning membership of both north and south Pacific island countries and Australia. It is an official observer at the United Nations.

The mission of Pacific Islands Forum is “to work in support of Forum member governments, to enhance the economic and social well-being of the people of the South Pacific by fostering cooperation between governments and between international agencies, and by representing the interests of Forum members in ways agreed by the Forum”. Its decisions are implemented by the Pacific Islands Forum Secretariat (PIFS), which grew out of the South Pacific Bureau for Economic Co-operation (SPEC). As well as its role in harmonising regional positions on various political and policy issues, the Forum Secretariat has technical programmes in economic development, transport and trade. The Pacific Islands Forum Secretary General is the permanent Chairman of the Council of Regional Organisations in the Pacific (CROP).

== Issues ==
President of Palau Tommy Remengesau declared the official theme of the Forum would be "The Ocean: Life & Future", with the major focus on the issue of climate change amidst concern over rising sea levels and sinking islands in the Pacific Ocean. He stated that the solution to the problem of rising seas as well as ocean warming and acidification is the reduction of CO_{2} emissions. Pacific islands leaders plan to produce a follow-up to the Majuro Declaration, which was passed at the 44th Pacific Islands Forum with the support of United Nations Secretary-General Ban Ki-moon. Secretary General of the Pacific Islands Forum Secretariat Tuiloma Neroni Slade commended Remengesau for the choice of theme, noting "it is a theme that is most timely with considerable strategic significance in the lead up to the 3rd UN conference on Small Islands Developing States (SIDS) to be held in Samoa, in September."

Other topics on the agenda for the Forum include commercial fishing and non-communicable diseases. Earlier this year, President Remengesau proposed a ban on commercial fishing in Palau. Bans and other ways to promote marine conservation will be discussed at the Forum. Leaders are upset that despite the lucrative nature of the Pacific tuna fishing industry, worth approximately four billion US dollars per year, it is poorly managed and little of the money trickles back to Pacific countries. Prevalence of smoking and obesity are widespread in the Pacific, and leaders in Palau want to discuss ways to reduce these problems at the Forum. To model good practices, smoking has been banned during the course of the event, and dietary guidelines have been put in place for food served at all meetings during the event.

The readmission of Fiji to the Pacific Islands Forum was also discussed at the Forum. Fiji was banned in 2009 after the military government that took power in the 2006 Fijian coup d'état promised elections in 2009 but failed to hold them. However, readmission is unlikely to occur before the Fijian election in September. Prime Minister of New Zealand John Key said he would discuss allowing Fiji to return to the Forum, but Foreign Minister of Fiji Ratu Inoke Kubuabola previously stated that Fiji would not consider reapplying unless Australia and New Zealand were banned from the forum.

== Representatives ==
In addition to representatives from each of the 15 participating countries, representatives of major powers such as the United States, China, India, and the European Union also attended the forum. Former White House Chief of Staff and now former Counselor to the President John Podesta led the US delegation at the forum, a group including senior officials from the National Security Council, United States Pacific Command, United States Coast Guard, United States Department of State, United States Department of the Interior, Peace Corps, United States Agency for International Development, and Hawaii. The delegation of the European Union was led by High Representative of the Union for Foreign Affairs and Security Policy for the EU and Vice-President of the European Commission Catherine Ashton. Ashton will speak at a plenary session on 30 July and host a dinner that same evening. Her goals are to discuss issues of mutual interest such as climate change and increase strategic relations between the EU and Pacific islands. The EU has already agreed to provide over 750 million Euros for bilateral and regional cooperation.

Prime Minister of Australia Tony Abbott and Prime Minister of New Zealand John Key, heads of government of the two largest participating countries in the Forum, were both unable to attend. Tony Abbott was occupied with matters concerning the crash of Malaysia Airlines Flight 17. The Australian delegation was led by Deputy Prime Minister of Australia Warren Truss and Parliamentary Secretary Brett Mason. The New Zealand delegation was led by Foreign Minister Murray McCully, who promised a $5 million programme to update navigation maps for the region, and to help protect Pacific fisheries. The Green Party of Aotearoa New Zealand condemned Key for not attending the forum, and accused both leaders of not caring deeply enough about the effects of climate change.

== Results ==
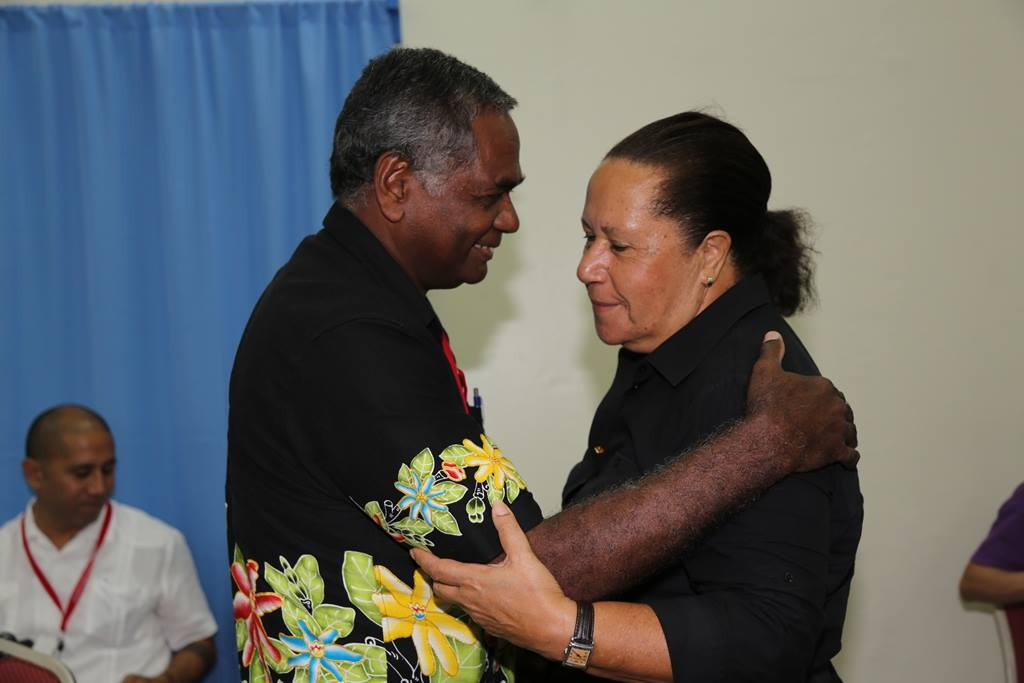
Dr Jimmie Rodgers congratulates Meg Taylor who was appointed as the first female Secretary General of the PIF

The forum concluded with Dame Meg Taylor of Papua New Guinea being appointed as the first female Secretary General of the Pacific Islands Forum.
