= List of countries whose capital is not their largest city =

The list of countries whose capital is not their largest city refers to the list of sovereign states whose capital is not their most populated city. (Note: The population data is based on city proper instead of metropolitan area)

Countries whose capital is not the largest city (by city boundaries population)

== List ==
Country	Capital	Population	Largest city	Population	Ratio	Notes
Australia	Canberra	426,704	Sydney	5,312,163	12.6	A planned city, Canberra has been Australia's capital city since its foundation in 1913. However, the national parliament was based in Melbourne, Victoria until 1927. Canberra is situated within the Australian Capital Territory.
Belize	Belmopan	20,621	Belize City	61,762	3.07	Belize City was the capital until 1970.
Benin	Porto-Novo	264,320	Cotonou	761,100	3.4	Cotonou is the de facto capital with seat of government. Both cities are part of the same metropolitan area.
Bolivia	Sucre	259,388	Santa Cruz de la Sierra	1,453,549	7.1	La Paz is the de facto capital with the seat of government; it is in Bolivia's second most populous metropolitan area.
Brazil	Brasília	3,500,000	São Paulo	12,252,023	4.25	Brasília, a planned city, has been the capital since its inauguration in 1960. Rio de Janeiro was capital from 1763 until 1960. Brasília is the third most populous city in Brazil and the seventh largest metropolitan area.
Burundi	Gitega	41,944	Bujumbura	1,092,859	26.06	Bujumbura was the capital until 2019.
Cameroon	Yaoundé	1,430,000	Douala	2,000,000 +	1.4	Yaoundé is the second largest city in Cameroon. Douala was the capital until 1902. In 1902, Buéa was the capital of British Cameroons prior to reunification. On October 1, 2017, Ambazonia became partially independent, Buéa is the capital of Ambazonia.
Canada	Ottawa	1,017,449	Toronto	2,794,356	2.75	Toronto was the capital of the Province of Canada from 1849 to 1852 and 1856 to 1858. For some years before, Kingston was the de facto capital, but when time came to form the United Province of Canada in 1841, an official capital needed to be designated. There was much controversy until Queen Victoria made her ruling (supported by a vote with a majority of 3) in favour of Ottawa. Both cities were made part of Ontario province.
China	Beijing	22,000,000	Shanghai (urban metropolitan area)	30,484,300	1.39	With a population of more than 19 million, Beijing is the second largest city in China after Shanghai. However, the size of Chonqging Municipality is about that of the sovereign country of Austria. University of Washington professor Kam Wing Chan argued that Chongqing's status is more akin to that of a province rather than a city. Chongqing was the capital from 1937 to 1945.
Ecuador	Quito	1,763,275	Guayaquil	2,650,288	1.5	Quito is the second largest city in Ecuador.
Equatorial Guinea	Ciudad de la Paz	2,000	Malabo	297,000	148.5	Malabo was the capital until January 2026.
Gambia	Banjul	31,301	Serrekunda	337,000	10.77	Both cities are part of the same metropolitan area.
India	New Delhi	249,998	Mumbai	12,442,373	49.77	In 1912, the capital was moved from Calcutta (now Kolkata) to New Delhi, a district of Delhi, which served as the capital of the Mughal Empire.
Israel	Jerusalem (limited recognition)	363,095 (excluding East Jerusalem)	Tel Aviv	460,613	1.2	Jerusalem has only limited recognition as the capital of Israel. It would be Israel's largest city if East Jerusalem was included (increasing the population to 936,425). However, Israel's occupation of East Jerusalem is not internationally recognized. Excluding East Jerusalem, Tel Aviv is Israel's largest city. Tel Aviv was the main capital until 1948, and in 1948 became a second capital, and both cities are part of the same metropolitan area.
Ivory Coast	Yamoussoukro	200,659	Abidjan	4,348,000	21.7	Abidjan was the capital until 1983.
Kazakhstan	Astana	743,014	Almaty	1,450,095	1.95	Almaty was the capital from 1927 to 1997. Astana was named Nur-Sultan from 2019 until 2022.
Liechtenstein	Vaduz	5,109	Schaan	6,039	1.14	Vaduz is the second largest city in Liechtenstein. Both cities are part of the same metropolitan area.
Federated States of Micronesia	Palikir	5,000	Weno	13,000	1.4	Palikir is the second largest city of Micronesia.
Malta	Valletta	5,827	St. Paul's Bay	29,097	6.62	Valletta is part of the Central Region, a conurbation with a population of 111,994. Both cities are part of the same metropolitan area.
Morocco	Rabat	627,000	Casablanca	4,150,000	6.62	Rabat is the seventh largest city in Morocco.
Myanmar	Naypyidaw	925,000	Yangon	4,346,000	4.7	Yangon was the capital until 2006. Naypyidaw is a planned city without contiguous urban areas or a proper metro area. Yangon is still the biggest city, population wise whereas Naypyidaw is the biggest city in terms of size.
Nauru	Yaren	803	Meneng	1,797	2.28	Nauru does not have a de jure capital, but Yaren is capital de facto.
New Zealand	Wellington	209,800	Auckland	1,547,200	7.37	Auckland was the capital from 1841 to 1865.
Nigeria	Abuja	778,567	Lagos	7,937,932	10.2	Lagos was the capital until 1991.
Pakistan	Islamabad	1,014,825	Karachi	14,910,352	14.69	Karachi was the capital from 1947 to 1958.
Palau	Ngerulmud	0	Koror	11,200	-	Koror was the capital until 2006. Ngerulmud has technically not been finished with the only major building being a massive complex for the country's national legislature, the Palau National Congress (made up of the House of Delegates and the Senate) as well as the executive branch of the Republic of Palau and the Supreme Court of Palau.
Palestine	Jerusalem (limited recognition)	573,330 (East Jerusalem)	Gaza City	590,481	5.67	Jerusalem is claimed as the capital of the State of Palestine although East Jerusalem is still under Israeli occupation since 1967. Gaza City is the country's largest city prior to evacuations in 2023.
Palestine	Ramallah (administrative centre)	104,173	Gaza City	590,481	5.67	Jerusalem is claimed as the capital of the State of Palestine although East Jerusalem is still under Israeli occupation since 1967. Gaza City is the country's largest city prior to evacuations in 2023.
Philippines	Manila	1,780,148	Quezon City	2,936,116	1.67	Quezon City, a northeastern suburb of Manila, was planned as the post-colonial capital of the Philippines and officially declared the capital after independence from 1948. In 1976, both cities were made part of the Metropolitan Manila region. It had overtaken Manila as the largest city proper of the Philippines by the 1990 census.
San Marino	San Marino	4,211	Serravalle	10,601	2.52	Both cities are part of the same metropolitan area.
South Africa	Pretoria	2,345,908	Johannesburg	5,635,000	1.66	Cape Town (pop. 4.8 million) and Bloemfontein (metro pop. 747,431) serve as legislative and judicial capitals respectively. Both cities were made part of the Gauteng province.
Switzerland	Bern	138,041	Zürich	397,698	2.88	Switzerland does not have a de jure capital, but Bern was designated "federal city" with the seat of the two parliament chambers in 1848, when for the first time the independent Swiss states established standing federal authorities. Important federal authorities are also located in Lausanne (most notably: the Federal Supreme Court), Zürich, Lucerne, Bellinzona and St. Gallen. Zürich was the capital from 1415 to 1530.
Republic of China (Taiwan)	Taipei	2,668,572	New Taipei	4,004,367	1.5	Despite having no formal designation to the national capital of the ROC by law, Taipei has been the seat of the ROC central government since 1949. Both cities are part of the same metropolitan area; before 2010, New Taipei City was known as Taipei County.
Tanzania	Dodoma	324,347	Dar es Salaam	2,497,940	7.70	Dar es Salaam was the capital until 1996.
Trinidad and Tobago	Port of Spain	49,867	Chaguanas	83,489	1.67	Port of Spain is the third most populated city in Trinidad and Tobago. Both cities are part of the same metropolitan area.
Turkey	Ankara	5,150,072	Istanbul	14,377,018	3.4	Istanbul (as Constantinople) was the capital of the Ottoman Empire from 1453 to 1922.
United Arab Emirates	Abu Dhabi	896,751	Dubai	2,262,000	2.52	Abu Dhabi is the second largest city in the United Arab Emirates.
United States	Washington, D.C.	705,749	New York City (city proper)	8,398,748	12.72	New York was the capital from 1785 to 1790 and the largest city in 1790 (narrowly edging out the next capital, Philadelphia, which served as capital from 1790 to 1800). Philadelphia was the nation's second-largest city when it was the capital. Washington, D.C. is the 22nd-largest city in the United States, but the Washington metropolitan area is the seventh-largest and Washington–Baltimore combined statistical area is the third-largest. However, Los Angeles County with a population of 10 million is the largest, most populated county in the country.
United States	Washington, D.C.	705,749	Los Angeles (county boundaries)	9,694,934	24.60	
Vietnam	Hanoi	8,807,523	Ho Chi Minh City	14,002,598	1.6	Ho Chi Minh City, formerly Saigon, was the capital of South Vietnam prior to reunification.

== See also ==
- List of national capitals by population - A list of capitals by population.
