= List of purpose-built capitals of country subdivisions =

This is a list of purpose-built capitals of country subdivisions.

== List ==
City	Capital of		Date	Notes
City	Subdivision	Country	Date	Notes
Adelaide	South Australia	Australia	1836	
Amaravati	Andhra Pradesh	India	2014	moved from Hyderabad
Banjarbaru	South Kalimantan	Indonesia	2022	moved from Banjarmasin, construction of the city began in 1953 and official city status was given in 1999
Belo Horizonte	Minas Gerais	Brazil	1897	moved from Ouro Preto
Bhararisain	Uttarakhand	India	2021	serves as the summer capital, while Dehradun serves as the primary capital
Chandigarh	Punjab; Haryana	India	1953	because partition of India placed Punjab's capital, Lahore, in Pakistan; Haryana created out of part of Indian Punjab in 1966 and shares capital
Changwon	South Gyeongsang	South Korea	1983	moved from Busan
Columbia	South Carolina	United States	1790	moved from Charleston
Columbus	Ohio	United States	1816	moved from Chillicothe
Dharamshala	Himachal Pradesh	India	2017	serves as the winter capital, while Shimla remains the primary capital
Gandhinagar	Gujarat	India	1960	founded upon split of Bombay State into two states
Goiânia	Goiás	Brazil	1933	moved from Goiás Velho
Indianapolis	Indiana	United States	1825	moved from Corydon
Jackson	Mississippi	United States	1821	moved from Natchez
Jammu	Jammu and Kashmir	India	1947	serves as the winter capital, while Srinagar serves as the primary capital
Jefferson City	Missouri	United States	1826	moved from St. Charles
La Plata	Buenos Aires Province	Argentina	1882	moved from Buenos Aires
Lansing	Michigan	United States	1847	moved from Detroit
Lelystad	Flevoland	Netherlands	1967	the province consists almost entirely of reclaimed land
Madison	Wisconsin	United States	1836	capital moved from Burlington, now part of Iowa, in 1837
Magas	Ingushetia	Russia	2002	moved from Nazran
Maryborough	Queen's County	(Kingdom of Ireland) Ireland	1556	Named for Queen Mary I and founded as part of the Plantation of Laois and Offaly, an effort to replace the native Irish population of the region with English settlers. Today the town is known as Portlaoise and the county is County Laois.
Milledgeville	Georgia (U.S. state)	United States	1807	moved from Louisville; briefly moved to Macon in 1864, then back; moved to Atlanta in 1868
Molave	Zamboanga	Philippines	1948	moved from Dipolog; ceased to be the capital after the division of the province into Zamboanga del Norte and Zamboanga del Sur in 1952
Nagpur	Maharashtra	India	1960	serves as the winter capital, while Mumbai serves as the primary capital
Neuquén	Neuquén Province	Argentina	1904	moved from Chos Malal
Palayan	Nueva Ecija	Philippines	1965	moved from Cabanatuan; Cabanatuan retains the old provincial capitol and is still used by the provincial government
Palmas	Tocantins	Brazil	1990	founded as capital of the new state of Tocantins, formed in 1988 from part of the state of Goiás. Replaced the provisional capital of Miracema do Norte
Perth	Western Australia	Australia	1829	founded as the capital of the Swan River Colony, which, several years later, was enlarged and renamed Western Australia
Philipstown	King's County	(Kingdom of Ireland) Ireland	1556	Named for King Philip II and founded as part of the Plantation of Laois and Offaly, an effort to replace the native Irish population of the region with English settlers. It was replaced as the county town by Tullamore in 1883. Today Philipstown is known as Daingean and the county is County Offaly.
Pierre	South Dakota	United States	1889	When the Dakota Territory divided into North and South Dakota and gained statehood, South Dakota's capital moved from the prior territorial capital Bismarck, North Dakota which, by default, became state capital of North Dakota. Previous territorial capital before Bismarck was Yankton, South Dakota from 1861-1883.
Raleigh	North Carolina	United States	1794	Moved from New Bern
Salt Lake City	Utah	United States	1847	De facto capital of Utah prior to 1856 and de jure capital since.
Sapporo	Hokkaidō	Japan	1870s	from the early 1870s, moved from Hakodate
Savannah	Georgia (U.S. state)	United States	1733	Founded as capital of the new Georgia colony; remained capital until 1777 and was briefly again in 1782 and 1784-86
Shah Alam	Selangor	Malaysia	1978	Moved from Kuala Lumpur when the latter became a Federal Territory
Tallahassee	Florida	United States	1824	From the capitals of the colonies of East Florida and West Florida Pensacola and St. Augustine
Teresina	Piauí	Brazil	1852	moved from Oeiras
Trece Martires	Cavite	Philippines	1954	Moved from Cavite City; still the seat of the provincial government despite the capital having transferred to Imus making Trece Martires the de facto capital of Cavite while Imus is the de jure capital of the province.
Victoria	British Columbia	Canada	1849	Nearby Fort Victoria had existed earlier, but in 1849 the town was specifically laid out to be the capital of the new Colony of Vancouver Island; became capital of the Colony of British Columbia in 1866 when united with the mainland; remained capital after British Columbia became a Canadian province in 1871.
Zhongxing New Village	Taiwan Province	Republic of China	1956	moved from Taipei City. Not recognized by People's Republic of China, which still mark Taipei as capital (or not mark any capital) of its Taiwan Province on all its maps. It remained the capital until July 2018, when all remaining duties of the Taiwan Provincial Government were transferred to the National Development Council and other ministries of the Executive Yuan.

== See also ==
- Lists of capitals
