= List of national capitals by area =

This is a list of 'national capitals, ordered according to total area'. Capitals of dependent territories and disputed territories are marked in italics. The area of the capital city only includes the area occupied by the city and not the wider urban/metropolitan district or administrative division created solely for the city; except Ankara, which is a metropolitan municipality, so its entire metro area is within the capital city of Turkey, according to the Turkish administrative system.

== List ==
Rank	Country/Territory	Capital	Area	
Rank	Country/Territory	Capital	(km^{2})	(sq mi)
1	Turkey	Ankara	25,632	9,897
2	China	Beijing	16,410.5	6,336
3	Democratic Republic of the Congo	Kinshasa	9,965	3,848
4	Myanmar	Naypyidaw	7,054	2,724
5	Brazil	Brasília	5,802	2,240
6	Namibia	Windhoek	5,133	1,982
7	Mongolia	Ulaanbaatar	4,704.4	1,816.3
8	Laos	Vientiane	3,920	1,510
9	Oman	Muscat	3,500	1,400
10	Vietnam	Hanoi	3,358.6	1,296.8
11	Egypt	Cairo	3,085.12	1,191.17
12	Canada	Ottawa	2,970.30	1,077.34
	Hong Kong (China)	Hong Kong (Central - de facto; Victoria City – statutory)‌	2,754.97	1,063.70
13	Peru	Lima	2,672.3	1,031.8
14	Tanzania	Dodoma (official and legislative capital)	2,576	995
15	Russia	Moscow	2,561.4	989
16	South Africa	Cape Town (legislative capital)	2,461	950
17	Japan	Tokyo	2,194.07	847.14
18	Azerbaijan	Baku	2,140	830
19	Panama	Panama City	2,082	804
20	Ivory Coast	Yamoussoukro	2,075	801
21	Saudi Arabia	Riyadh	1,973	76
22	Bolivia	Sucre (constitutional and judicial capital)	1,768	683
23	Jordan	Amman	1,680	650
24	Colombia	Bogotá	1587	613
25	United Kingdom	London	1,572	607
26	Thailand	Bangkok	1,568.737	605.693
27	Libya	Tripoli	1,507	582
28	Dominican Republic	Santo Domingo	1,502	580
28	Honduras	Tegucigalpa (de facto and official constitutional capital) and Comayagüela (official constitutional capital)	1,502	580
30	Mexico	Mexico City	1,485	573
31	Nigeria	Abuja	1,476	570
32	Italy	Rome	1,287.36	497.05
33	Albania	Tirana	1,110	430
34	Mauritania	Nouakchott	1,000	400
35	Guatemala	Guatemala City	997	385
36	Zimbabwe	Harare	982.3	379.3
37	United Arab Emirates	Abu Dhabi	972	375
38	Germany	Berlin	891.3	344.1
39	Kuwait	Kuwait City	860	330
40	Ukraine	Kyiv	839	324
41	North Korea	Pyongyang	829.1	320.1
42	Australia	Canberra	814.2	314.4
43	Kazakhstan	Astana	810.2	312.8
	Yemen	Aden (temporary capital)	760	290
44	Singapore	Singapore	735.7	284.1
45	Rwanda	Kigali	730	280
46	Cuba	Havana	728.26	281.18
47	Malawi	Lilongwe	727.79	281.00
48	Finland	Helsinki	715.48	276.25
49	Kenya	Nairobi	696.1	268.8
50	South Africa	Pretoria (administrative and executive capital)	687.54	265.46
51	Cambodia	Phnom Penh	679	262
52	Iraq	Baghdad	673	260
53	Indonesia	Jakarta	660.982	255.207
54	Croatia	Zagreb	641.2	247.6
55	Chile	Santiago (official)	641	247.6
56	Uzbekistan	Tashkent	631.29	243.74
57	Iran	Tehran	615	237
58	South Korea	Seoul	605.21	233.67
59	Spain	Madrid	604.31	233.33
60	Republic of the Congo	Brazzaville	588	227
61	North Macedonia	Skopje	571.46	220.64
62	Niger	Niamey	552.27	213.23
63	Ethiopia	Addis Ababa	527	203
64	Hungary	Budapest	525.2	202.8
65	(Kosovo) Kosovo	Pristina	523.13	201.98
66	Poland	Warsaw	517.24	199.71
67	(Georgia (country)) Georgia	Tbilisi	504.3	194.7
68	Bulgaria	Sofia	500	200
69	Czech Republic	Prague	496.21	191.59
70	Norway	Oslo	480	190
71	Bolivia	La Paz (seat of national executive, legislative and electoral bodies)	472	182
72	Turkmenistan	Ashgabat	470	180
73	Guinea	Conakry	450	170
74	Venezuela	Caracas	433	167
75	Austria	Vienna	414.78	160.15
76	Belarus	Minsk	409.53	158.12
77	Lithuania	Vilnius	401	155
78	Serbia	Belgrade	389.12	150.24
79	Kyrgyzstan	Bishkek	386	149
80	Afghanistan	Kabul	381.3	147.9
81	Somalia	Mogadishu	370	140
82	Slovakia	Bratislava	367.584	141.925
83	Algeria	Algiers	363	140
84	Zambia	Lusaka	360	140
85	Mozambique	Maputo	347.69	134.24
86	Sudan	Khartoum	322.7	124.6
87	Bangladesh	Dhaka	306	118
88	Latvia	Riga	304	117.375
89	New Zealand	Wellington	289.91	111.93
90	Slovenia	Ljubljana	274.99	170.87
91	Taiwan	Taipei	271.80	104.94
92	Nicaragua	Managua	267	103
	(Western Sahara) Sahrawi Arab Democratic Republic	Laayoune (declared capital)	247.8	95.68
93	Mali	Bamako	245.0	94.6
94	Iceland	Reykjavík	244	94
95	Malaysia	Kuala Lumpur (official, royal capital, seat of national legislature)	243	94
96	Romania	Bucharest	240	92.28
97	Papua New Guinea	Port Moresby	240	90
98	South Africa	Bloemfontein (judicial capital)	236.17	91.19
99	Armenia	Yerevan	223	86
100	Pakistan	Islamabad	220.15	85
101	Netherlands	Amsterdam (de jure capital under the Constitution of the Netherlands)	219.32	84.68
102	Tunisia	Tunis	212	82
103	Argentina	Buenos Aires	205.9	79.5
104	Tajikistan	Dushanbe	203	78
105	Uruguay	Montevideo	201	77.5
106	The Bahamas	Nassau	200	80
106	Djibouti	Djibouti City	200	80
	Puerto Rico (United States)	San Juan	199	77.0
108	Ecuador	Quito	197.5	76.3
109	Liberia	Monrovia	194.25	75
110	Uganda	Kampala	189	73
111	Sweden	Stockholm	188	72.5
112	Suriname	Paramaribo	182	70.27
113	Cameroon	Yaoundé	180	70
114	(Timor-Leste) East Timor	Dili	178.62	68.97
115	United States	Washington, D.C.	177.0	68.35
	Faroe Islands (Denmark)	Tórshavn	173	67
116	Botswana	Gaborone	169	65.25
117	Belgium	Brussels	162.42	62.71
118	Estonia	Tallinn	159.2	61.5
119	Bosnia and Herzegovina	Sarajevo	141.5	54.6
120	Lesotho	Maseru	137.5	53.1
121	Qatar	Doha	132	51
122	Yemen	Sana'a (official capital, under the control of the Houthis)	126	49
123	Israel & Palestine	Jerusalem	125.126	48.323
124	Samoa	Apia	123.81	47.8
125	Moldova	Chișinău	123	47
	Macau (China)	Macau‌	119.3	46.1
	Northern Mariana Islands (United States)	Saipan	118.98	45.94
126	(Republic of Ireland) Ireland	Dublin	117.8	45.5
127	Paraguay	Asunción	117	45.2
128	Morocco	Rabat	117	45.17
129	Angola	Luanda	116	45
130	Eswatini	Lobamba (legislative and royal capital)	112	43.24
131	Benin	Porto-Novo (official and legislative capital)	110	40
132	Montenegro	Podgorica (official capital)	108	42
133	(Federated States of Micronesia) Micronesia	Palikir	107.41	41.47
134	France	Paris	105.4	40.7
135	Syria	Damascus	105	41
136	Chad	N'Djamena	104	40
137	Cape Verde	Praia	102.6	39.6
138	Brunei	Bandar Seri Begawan	100.36	38.75
139	Portugal	Lisbon	100.05	38.63
140	Togo	Lomé	99.14	38.28
141	Netherlands	The Hague (seat of government)	98.13	37.89
	Northern Cyprus	North Nicosia	92.8	35.8
142	Denmark	Copenhagen	90.01	34.75
143	Madagascar	Antananarivo	85	33
144	Sierra Leone	Freetown	82.48	31.85
145	Eswatini	Mbabane (administrative capital)	81.76	31.57
146	Senegal	Dakar	79.83	30.82
147	Saint Lucia	Castries	79	30.5
148	Guinea-Bissau	Bissau	77.5	29.9
149	El Salvador	San Salvador	72.25	27.90
150	Guyana	Georgetown	70	30
151	Central African Republic	Bangui	67	26
151	Grenada	Saint George's	67	26
152	Gabon	Libreville	65.42	25.26
	Transnistria	Tiraspol	55.56	21.45
153	South Sudan	Juba	52	20
154	Switzerland	Bern (de facto)	51.62	19.93
155	Luxembourg	Luxembourg City	51.46	19.87
156	Nepal	Kathmandu	49.45	19.09
	Greenland (Denmark)	Nuuk	49	18.8
	Malaysia	Putrajaya (administrative and judicial capital)	49	19
157	Mauritius	Port Louis	46.7	18.0
	Niue (New Zealand)	Alofi	46.48	17.95
	New Caledonia (France)	Nouméa	45.7	17.6
158	Eritrea	Asmara	45	17
159	Costa Rica	San José	44.62	17.23
160	India	New Delhi	42.7	16.5
161	Philippines	Manila	42.34	16.35
162	Barbados	Bridgetown	40	15
163	Greece	Athens	38.964	15.044
164	Sri Lanka	Colombo (executive and judicial capital)	37.31	14.41
165	Haiti	Port-au-Prince	36.04	13.92
166	Belize	Belmopan	32.78	12.66
167	Kiribati	Tarawa	31.02	11.98
168	Bahrain	Manama	30	10
168	Comoros	Moroni	30	10
	Cayman Islands (United Kingdom)	George Town	29	11
	Cook Islands (New Zealand)	Avarua	28	11
169	Fiji	Suva	26.24	
170	Bhutan	Thimphu	26.1	10.1
171	Jamaica	Kingston	25	10
	Saint Pierre and Miquelon (France)	Saint Pierre	25	10
172	Vanuatu	Port Vila	23.6	9.1
	Aruba (Netherlands)	Oranjestad	23	9
173	Burundi	Gitega	22	8
173	Solomon Islands	Honiara	22	8
	Collectivity of Saint Martin (France)	Marigot	21.6	
174	Equatorial Guinea	Malabo	21	8
	Åland (Finland)	Mariehamn	20.75	8.01
175	Ghana	Accra	20.4	7.9
176	Seychelles	Victoria	20.1	7.8
177	Cyprus	Nicosia	20.08	7.75
178	Lebanon	Beirut	19	7
	French Polynesia (France)	Papeete	17.4	6.7
	Turks and Caicos Islands (United Kingdom)	Cockburn Town	17.39	6.71
179	Liechtenstein	Vaduz	17.28	6.67
180	São Tomé and Príncipe	São Tomé	17	7
181	Sri Lanka	Sri Jayawardenepura Kotte (legislative capital)	17	7
	Palestine	Ramallah (de facto)	16.3	6.3
182	Andorra	Andorra la Vella	12	5
182	The Gambia	Banjul	12	5
182	Trinidad and Tobago	Port of Spain	12	5
183	Maldives	Malé	11.22	4.33
	Isle of Man (United Kingdom)	Douglas	11	4.1
	Jersey (United Kingdom)	Saint Helier	10.6	4.1
184	Antigua and Barbuda	Saint John's	10	4
185	Marshall Islands	Majuro	9.7	3.7
	American Samoa (United States)	Pago Pago	8.85	3.42
186	San Marino	City of San Marino	7.09	2.74
	Gibraltar (United Kingdom)	Gibraltar	6.8	2.6
	(Western Sahara) Sahrawi Arab Democratic Republic	Tifariti (temporary capital)	6.78	2.62
	Guernsey (United Kingdom)	Saint Peter Port	6.5	2.5
	Cocos (Keeling) Islands (Australia)	West Island	6.23	2.41
187	Saint Kitts and Nevis	Basseterre	6.1	2.5
188	Dominica	Roseau	5.4	2.1
	Pitcairn Islands (United Kingdom)	Adamstown	4.6	1.8
	Wallis and Futuna (France)	Mata-Utu	4.33	1.67
	Saint Helena, Ascension and Tristan da Cunha (United Kingdom)	Jamestown	3.6	1.4
	Saint Barthélemy (France)	Gustavia	3.4	1.3
	United States Virgin Islands (United States)	Charlotte Amalie	3.14	1.213
	Guam (United States)	Hagåtña	3	1
189	Tuvalu	Funafuti	2.79	1.08
	Anguilla (United Kingdom)	The Valley	2.72	1.05
	Falkland Islands (United Kingdom)	Stanley	2.5	1.0
190	Monaco	Monaco	2.08	0.80
191	Nauru	Yaren (de facto)	1.5	0.6
	Bermuda (United Kingdom)	Hamilton	0.7	0.28
192	Malta	Valletta	0.61	0.24
193	(Holy See) Vatican City	Vatican City	0.49	0.19
194	Palau	Ngerulmud	0.45	0.17
	Montserrat (United Kingdom)	Brades (de facto)	n/a	n/a
	Norfolk Island (Australia)	Kingston (de facto)	n/a	n/a
	British Virgin Islands (United Kingdom)	Road Town	n/a	n/a
	Christmas Island (Australia)	Flying Fish Cove	n/a	n/a

== See more ==
- List of national capitals by population
- Capital city
- List of national capitals
- List of largest cities by area
- List of countries and dependencies by area
