= List of national capitals by population =

This is a list of national capitals, ordered according to population. The population statistics given refer only to the official capital area, and do not include the wider metropolitan/urban district.

== Table ==
- Note: links for each location marked by an asterisk (*) go to the relevant list of cities. Where a list of cities is not available, the links go to the article on the country.

Country / dependency	Capital	Population	% of country	Source
China *	Beijing	21,858,000	1.5%	2018
Japan *	Tokyo	14,094,034	11.3%	2023
Russia *	Moscow	13,274,285	9.1%	2025
DR Congo *	Kinshasa	12,691,000	13.2%	2017
Indonesia *	Jakarta	10,562,088	3.9%	2020
Peru *	Lima	10,151,000	30.1%	2023
Egypt *	Cairo	10,107,125	9.3%	2022
South Korea *	Seoul	9,508,451	18.3%	2022
Mexico	Mexico City	9,209,944	7.3%	2020
United Kingdom *	London	9,002,488	13.4%	2020
Bangladesh *	Dhaka	8,906,039	5.3%	2011
Iran *	Tehran	8,693,706	9.9%	2016
Thailand	Bangkok	8,305,218	11.6%	2010
Vietnam	Hanoi	8,053,663	8.3%	2019
Iraq *	Baghdad	7,682,136	17.6%	2021
Saudi Arabia	Riyadh	7,676,654	21.4%	2018
Hong Kong (China)	Hong Kong	7,534,200	100%	2024
Colombia *	Bogotá	7,181,469	13.9%	2011
Chile *	Santiago	6,310,000	32.4%	2012
Turkey *	Ankara	5,747,325	6.8%	2021
Singapore	Singapore	5,917,600	100%	2023
Afghanistan *	Kabul	4,601,789	11.5%	2021
Kenya	Nairobi	4,397,073	8.3%	2019
Jordan	Amman	4,061,150	36.4%	2021
Algeria *	Algiers	3,915,811	8.9%	2011
Germany *	Berlin	3,677,472	4.4%	2021
Spain *	Madrid	3,305,408	7.0%	2021
Argentina *	Buenos Aires	3,120,612	6.9%	2022
Ethiopia *	Addis Ababa	3,040,740	2.5%	2012
Brazil *	Brasília	2,982,818	1.4%	2024
Guatemala	Guatemala City	2,934,841	16.7%	2020
South Africa	Pretoria	2,921,488	4.9%	2011
Ukraine *	Kyiv	2,920,873	6.7%	2021
North Korea *	Pyongyang	2,870,000	11.1%	2016
Uzbekistan *	Tashkent	2,860,600	8.4%	2022
Italy *	Rome	2,761,632	4.7%	2022
Ecuador	Quito	2,800,388	15.7%	2020
Cameroon	Yaoundé	2,765,568	10.2%	2015
Zambia	Lusaka	2,731,696	14.0%	2020
Sudan *	Khartoum	2,682,431	5.9%	2012
Taiwan *	Taipei (de facto)	2,608,332	10.9%	2020
Yemen	Sanaa	2,575,347	7.8%	2012
Angola	Luanda	2,571,861	7.5%	2020
Burkina Faso	Ouagadougou	2,453,496	11.1%	2019
Ghana	Accra	2,388,000	7.3%	2017
Somalia	Mogadishu	2,388,000	14.0%	2021
Azerbaijan	Baku	2,303,100	22.3%	2022
Cambodia	Phnom Penh	2,281,951	13.8%	2019
Venezuela	Caracas	2,245,744	8.0%	2016
France *	Paris	2,139,907	3.3%	2022
Cuba	Havana	2,132,183	18.9%	2020
Zimbabwe	Harare	2,123,132	13.3%	2012
Syria	Damascus	2,079,000	9.7%	2019
Belarus	Minsk	1,996,553	20.8%	2022
Austria	Vienna	1,962,779	22.0%	2022
Poland	Warsaw	1,863,056	4.9%	2021
Philippines *	Manila	1,846,513	1.6%	2020
Mali	Bamako	1,809,106	8.3%	2009
Malaysia *	Kuala Lumpur	1,782,500	5.3%	2019
Romania *	Bucharest	1,716,983	8.9%	2021
Hungary *	Budapest	1,706,851	17.6%	2022
Congo	Brazzaville	1,696,392	29.1%	2015
Serbia *	Belgrade	1,688,667	23.1%	2021
Uganda	Kampala	1,680,600	3.7%	2019
Guinea	Conakry	1,660,973	12.3%	2014
Kazakhstan *	Astana	1,511,807	7.9%	2024
Mongolia	Ulaanbaatar	1,466,125	43.8%	2020
Honduras	Tegucigalpa	1,444,085	14.0%	2021
Senegal	Dakar	1,438,725	8.5%	2021
Czech Republic *	Prague	1,357,326	12.9%	2023
Niger *	Niamey	1,334,984	5.3%	2020
Uruguay	Montevideo	1,319,108	38.5%	2011
Bulgaria *	Sofia	1,307,439	19.0%	2021
Oman	Muscat	1,294,101	28.6%	2021
Madagascar	Antananarivo	1,275,207	4.4%	2018
Nigeria	Abuja	1,235,880	0.6%	2011
Georgia	Tbilisi	1,201,769	32.0%	2022
Mauritania *	Nouakchott	1,195,600	25.9%	2019
Qatar *	Doha	1,186,023	44.1%	2020
Libya	Tripoli	1,170,000	17.4%	2019
Myanmar	Naypyidaw	1,160,242	2.2%	2014
Rwanda	Kigali	1,132,686	8.4%	2012
Mozambique	Maputo	1,124,988	3.5%	2020
Dominican Republic	Santo Domingo	1,111,838	10.0%	2010
Armenia *	Yerevan	1,096,100	39.3%	2021
Panama	Panama City	1,086,990	25.0%	2023
Kyrgyzstan	Bishkek	1,074,075	16.5%	2021
Sierra Leone	Freetown	1,055,964	12.5%	2015
Nicaragua	Managua	1,055,247	15.4%	2020
Canada *	Ottawa	1,017,449	2.7%	2021
Pakistan *	Islamabad	1,014,825	0.4%	2017
Liberia	Monrovia	1,010,970	19.5%	2008
United Arab Emirates	Abu Dhabi	1,010,092	10.8%	2020
Malawi	Lilongwe	989,318	5.0%	2018
Haiti	Port-au-Prince	987,310	8.6%	2015
Sweden *	Stockholm	978,770	9.4%	2021
Eritrea	Asmara	963,000	26.6%	2020
Israel *	Jerusalem (Note: The Jerusalem Law states that "Jerusalem, complete and united, is the capital of Israel" and the city serves as the seat of the government, home to the President's residence, government offices, supreme court, and parliament. The United Nations and most countries do not accept the Jerusalem Law and maintain their embassies in other cities such as Tel Aviv, Ramat Gan, and Herzliya (see the CIA Factbook and Map of Israel) The Palestinian Authority sees East Jerusalem as the capital of a future Palestinian state and the city's final status awaits future negotiations between Israel and the Palestinian Authority (see "Negotiating Jerusalem", University of Maryland Archived 2006-05-14 at the Wayback Machine). See Positions on Jerusalem for more information.)	936,425	10.5%	2019
Laos	Vientiane	927,724	12.5%	2019
Chad	N'Djamena	916,000	5.3%	2009
Netherlands *	Amsterdam	905,234	5.2%	2022
Central African Republic	Bangui	889,231	16.3%	2020
Tajikistan *	Dushanbe	863,400	8.9%	2020
Nepal *	Kathmandu	845,767	2.8%	2021
Togo	Lomé	837,437	9.7%	2010
Turkmenistan *	Ashgabat	791,000	12.5%	2017
Moldova	Chişinău	779,300	25.5%	2019
Croatia *	Zagreb	769,944	19.0%	2021
Gabon *	Libreville	703,904	30.1%	2013
Norway *	Oslo	697,010	12.9%	2021
Macau (China)	Macau	671,900	100%	2022
United States *	Washington, D.C.	670,050	0.2%	2021
Jamaica	Kingston	662,491	23.4%	2019
Finland *	Helsinki	658,864	11.9%	2021
Tunisia	Tunis	638,845	5.2%	2014
Denmark *	Copenhagen	638,117	10.9%	2021
Greece *	Athens	637,798	6.1%	2021
Latvia *	Riga	605,802	32.3%	2021
Djibouti	Djibouti City	604,013	54.6%	2012
Ireland *	Dublin	592,713	11.9%	2022
Morocco	Rabat	577,827	1.6%	2014
Lithuania	Vilnius	576,195	20.7%	2022
El Salvador	San Salvador	570,459	9.0%	2019
Albania	Tirana	557,422	19.5%	2011
North Macedonia	Skopje	544,086	25.9%	2015
South Sudan *	Juba	525,953	4.9%	2017
Paraguay	Asunción	521,559	7.8%	2020
Portugal *	Lisbon	509,614	5.0%	2020
Guinea-Bissau	Bissau	492,004	23.9%	2015
Slovakia	Bratislava	440,948	8.1%	2020
Estonia *	Tallinn	438,341	33.0%	2021
Australia *	Canberra	431,380	1.7%	2020
Namibia	Windhoek	431,000	17.0%	2020
Tanzania	Dodoma	410,956	0.6%	2012
Papua New Guinea *	Port Moresby	364,145	3.7%	2011
Ivory Coast	Yamoussoukro	361,893	1.3%	2020
Lebanon	Beirut	361,366	6.5%	2014
Bolivia	Sucre	360,544	3.0%	2022
Puerto Rico (US)	San Juan	342,259	10.5%	2020
Costa Rica	San José	342,188	6.6%	2018
Lesotho	Maseru	330,760	14.5%	2016
Cyprus	Nicosia	326,739	26.3%	2016
Slovenia *	Ljubljana	285,604	13.5%	2021
Timor-Leste	Dili	277,279	21.0%	2015
Bosnia and Herzegovina	Sarajevo	275,524	8.4%	2013
Bahamas	Nassau	274,400	67.3%	2016
Botswana	Gaborone	273,602	10.6%	2020
Benin	Porto-Novo	264,320	2.0%	2013
India *	New Delhi	249,998	0.02%	2011
Suriname	Paramaribo	240,924	39.3%	2012
Kosovo *	Pristina	227,466	14.3%	2024
Sahrawi Arab Democratic Republic	Laayoune (claimed); Tifariti (de facto)	217,732; 3,000	—N/a	2014
New Zealand *	Wellington	217,000	4.2%	2021
Maldives *	Malé	211,908	40.6%	2022
Bahrain	Manama	200,000	13.7%	2020
Montenegro *	Podgorica	190,488	30.3%	2020
Belgium	Brussels	187,686	1.6%	2022
Cape Verde	Praia	159,050	27.1%	2017
Mauritius	Port Louis	147,066	11.3%	2018
Curaçao (Netherlands)	Willemstad	136,660	71.8%	2011
Luxembourg *	Luxembourg City	136,208	21.3%	2025
Burundi	Gitega	135,467	1.1%	2020
Switzerland *	Bern (de facto)	134,591	1.5%	2020
Transnistria	Tiraspol	133,807	38.5%	2015
Iceland *	Reykjavík	133,262	36.0%	2021
Guyana	Georgetown	118,363	14.7%	2012
Bhutan	Thimphu	114,551	14.7%	2017
Comoros	Moroni	111,326	13.5%	2016
Barbados	Bridgetown	110,000	39.1%	2014
Sri Lanka	Sri Jayawardenepura Kotte	107,925	0.5%	2012
Brunei	Bandar Seri Begawan	100,700	22.6%	2007
Eswatini	Mbabane	94,874	8.0%	2010
New Caledonia (France)	Nouméa	94,285	32.8%	2019
Fiji	Suva	93,970	10.2%	2017
Solomon Islands	Honiara	92,344	13.0%	2021
São Tomé and Príncipe	São Tomé	71,868	32.2%	2015
Kiribati	Tarawa	70,480	54.7%	2020
Kuwait	Kuwait City	55,159	1.3%	2021
Vanuatu	Port Vila	51,437	16.1%	2016
Northern Mariana Islands (USA)	Saipan	47,565	96.1%	2017
Samoa	Apia	41,611	19.0%	2021
Palestine	Ramallah (de facto)	38,998	0.8%	2017
Monaco	Monaco	38,350	100%	2020
Jersey (UK)	Saint Helier	37,540	34.2%	2018
Trinidad and Tobago	Port of Spain	37,074	2.4%	2011
Cayman Islands (UK)	George Town	34,399	50.5%	2021
Gibraltar (UK)	Gibraltar	34,003	100%	2020
Grenada	St. George's	33,734	27.1%	2012
Gambia	Banjul	31,301	1.2%	2013
Aruba (Netherlands)	Oranjestad	28,294	26.6%	2010
Isle of Man (UK)	Douglas	27,938	33.2%	2011
Marshall Islands	Majuro	27,797	66.1%	2011
Tonga	Nukuʻalofa	27,600	26.0%	2022
Seychelles	Victoria	26,450	24.8%	2010
French Polynesia (France)	Papeete	26,926	8.9%	2017
Andorra	Andorra la Vella	22,873	28.9%	2022
Faroe Islands * (Denmark)	Tórshavn	22,738	43.0%	2022
Antigua and Barbuda *	St. John's	22,219	23.8%	2011
Belize	Belmopan	20,621	5.2%	2016
Saint Lucia	Castries	20,000	11.1%	2013
Guernsey (UK)	Saint Peter Port	18,958	30.1%	2019
Greenland (Denmark)	Nuuk	18,800	33.4%	2021
Dominica	Roseau	14,725	20.3%	2011
U.S. Virgin Islands (US)	Charlotte Amalie	14,477	14.5%	2020
Saint Kitts and Nevis	Basseterre	14,000	29.4%	2018
Saint Vincent and the Grenadines	Kingstown	12,909	12.4%	2012
British Virgin Islands (UK)	Road Town	12,603	40.5%	2012
Åland (Finland)	Mariehamn	11,736	39.0%	2021
Federated States of Micronesia	Palikir	6,647	5.9%	2010
Tuvalu	Funafuti	6,320	56.4%	2017
Malta	Valletta	5,827	1.1%	2019
Liechtenstein	Vaduz	5,774	14.8%	2021
Saint Pierre and Miquelon (France)	Saint-Pierre	5,394	91.7%	2019
Cook Islands	Avarua	4,906	28.9%	2016
San Marino	City of San Marino	4,061	12.0%	2021
Turks and Caicos Islands (UK)	Cockburn Town	3,720	8.2%	2016
American Samoa (USA)	Pago Pago	3,656	8.1%	2010
Saint Martin (France)	Marigot	3,229	10.1%	2017
Saint Barthélemy (France)	Gustavia	2,615	24.1%	2010
Falkland Islands (UK)	Stanley	2,460	65.4%	2016
Equatorial Guinea *	Ciudad de la Paz	2,000	0.1%	2018
Sint Maarten (Netherlands)	Philipsburg	1,894	4.3%	2011
Christmas Island (Australia)	Flying Fish Cove	1,599	86.8%	2016
Anguilla (UK)	The Valley	1,067	6.8%	2011
Guam (US)	Hagåtña	1,051	0.6%	2010
Wallis and Futuna (France)	Mata Utu	1,029	8.9%	2018
Bermuda (UK)	Hamilton	854	1.3%	2016
Nauru	Yaren (de facto)	747	6.0%	2011
Saint Helena (UK)	Jamestown	629	11.6%	2016
Niue	Alofi	597	30.8%	2017
Tokelau (NZ)	Atafu	541	29.3%	2016
Vatican City	Vatican City	764	100%	2023
Montserrat (UK)	Brades (de facto); Plymouth (de jure)	449; 0	—N/a	2011
Norfolk Island (Australia)	Kingston	341	19.5%	2015
Cocos (Keeling) Islands (Australia)	West Island	134	24.6%	2011
Pitcairn Islands (UK)	Adamstown	35	100%	2023
South Georgia and the South Sandwich Islands (UK)	King Edward Point	22	73.3%	2018
Palau	Ngerulmud	0	0.0%	2020

== By population density ==
Population data from the previous table. Area data from List of national capitals by area.
Country / dependency	Capital	Population	Area (km^{2})	Density (/km^{2})
Maldives *	Malé	211,908	1.9	111,531
Ghana	Accra	284,124	20.40	13,900
Philippines *	Manila	1,846,513	42.34	43,612
Bangladesh *	Dhaka	10,278,882	306.00	33,600
Haiti	Port-au-Prince	987,310	36.04	27,395
Jamaica	Kingston	662,491	25.00	26,500
Angola	Luanda	2,571,861	116.00	22,171
Eritrea	Asmara	963,000	45.00	21,400
Yemen	Sana'a	2,575,347	126.00	20,439
France *	Paris	2,139,907	105.40	20,303
Syria	Damascus	2,079,000	105.00	19,800
Lebanon	Beirut	361,366	19.00	19,019
Monaco	Monaco	38,350	2.08	18,438
Senegal	Dakar	1,438,725	79.83	18,022
Nepal *	Kathmandu	845,767	49.45	17,103
Greece *	Athens	637,798	38.96	16,369
Cyprus	Nicosia	326,739	20.08	16,272
Indonesia *	Jakarta	10,562,088	660.98	15,979
South Korea *	Seoul	9,508,451	605.21	15,711
Cameroon	Yaoundé	2,765,568	180.00	15,364
Argentina *	Buenos Aires	3,120,612	205.90	15,156
Madagascar	Antananarivo	1,275,207	85.00	15,002
Ecuador	Quito	2,800,388	197.50	14,179
Iran *	Tehran	8,693,706	615.00	14,136
Central African Republic	Bangui	889,231	67.00	13,272
Sierra Leone	Freetown	1,055,964	82.48	12,803
Afghanistan *	Kabul	4,601,789	381.30	12,069
Iraq *	Baghdad	7,682,136	673.00	11,415
Algeria *	Algiers	3,915,811	363.00	10,787
Gabon *	Libreville	703,904	65.42	10,760
South Sudan *	Juba	525,953	52.00	10,114
Chile *	Santiago	6,310,000	641.00	9,844
Taiwan *	Taipei	2,608,332	271.80	9,597
Malta	Valletta	5,827	0.61	9,552
Qatar *	Doha	1,186,023	132.00	8,985
Uganda	Kampala	1,680,600	189.00	8,892
Chad	N'Djamena	916,000	104.00	8,808
Togo	Lomé	837,437	99.14	8,447
Sudan *	Khartoum	2,682,431	322.70	8,312
Singapore	Singapore	5,917,600	735.70	8,043
El Salvador	San Salvador	570,459	72.25	7,896
Costa Rica	San José	342,188	44.62	7,669
Zambia	Lusaka	2,731,696	360.00	7,588
Israel *	Jerusalem	936,425	125.13	7,484
Mali	Bamako	1,809,106	245.00	7,384
Malaysia *	Kuala Lumpur	1,782,500	243.00	7,335
Romania *	Bucharest	1,716,983	240.00	7,154
Denmark *	Copenhagen	638,117	90.01	7,089
Bahrain	Manama	200,000	30.00	6,667
Uruguay	Montevideo	1,319,108	201.00	6,563
Somalia	Mogadishu	2,388,000	370.00	6,454
Japan *	Tokyo	14,094,034	2,194.07	6,424
Sri Lanka	Sri Jayawardenepura Kotte	107,925	17.00	6,349
Guinea-Bissau	Bissau	492,004	77.50	6,348
Moldova	Chișinău	779,300	123.00	6,336
Kenya	Nairobi	4,397,073	696.10	6,317
Mexico	Mexico City	9,209,944	1,485.00	6,202
Burundi	Gitega	135,467	22.00	6,158
India *	New Delhi	249,998	42.70	5,855
Ethiopia *	Addis Ababa	3,040,740	527.00	5,770
United Kingdom *	London	9,002,488	1,572.00	5,727
Macau (China)	Macau	671,900	119.30	5,632
Spain *	Madrid	3,305,408	604.31	5,470
Thailand	Bangkok	8,305,218	1,568.74	5,294
Sweden *	Stockholm	978,770	188.00	5,206
Liberia	Monrovia	1,010,970	194.25	5,204
Venezuela	Caracas	2,245,744	433.00	5,186
Russia *	Moscow	13,274,285	2,561.40	5,182
Portugal *	Lisbon	509,614	100.05	5,094
Ireland *	Dublin	592,713	117.80	5,032
Gibraltar (UK)	Gibraltar	34,003	6.80	5,000
Morocco	Rabat	577,827	117.00	4,939
Armenia *	Yerevan	1,096,100	223.00	4,915
Belarus	Minsk	1,996,553	409.53	4,875
Austria	Vienna	1,962,779	414.78	4,732
U.S. Virgin Islands (US)	Charlotte Amalie	14,477	3.14	4,611
Pakistan *	Islamabad	1,014,825	220.15	4,610
Uzbekistan *	Tashkent	2,860,600	631.29	4,531
Colombia *	Bogotá	7,181,469	1,587.00	4,525
Paraguay	Asunción	521,559	117.00	4,458
Bhutan	Thimphu	114,551	26.10	4,389
Serbia *	Belgrade	1,688,667	389.12	4,340
Tajikistan *	Dushanbe	863,400	203.00	4,253
South Africa	Pretoria	2,921,488	687.54	4,249
São Tomé and Príncipe	São Tomé	71,868	17.00	4,228
Solomon Islands	Honiara	92,344	22.00	4,197
Netherlands *	Amsterdam	905,234	219.32	4,127
Germany *	Berlin	3,677,472	891.30	4,126
Nicaragua	Managua	1,055,247	267.00	3,952
Saudi Arabia	Riyadh	7,676,654	1,973.00	3,891
Peru *	Lima	10,151,000	2,672.30	3,799
United States *	Washington, D.C.	670,050	177.00	3,786
Comoros	Moroni	111,326	30.00	3,711
Guinea	Conakry	1,660,973	450.00	3,691
Poland	Warsaw	1,863,056	517.24	3,602
Fiji	Suva	93,970	26.24	3,581
Jersey (UK)	Saint Helier	37,540	10.60	3,542
Ukraine *	Kyiv	2,920,873	839.00	3,481
North Korea *	Pyongyang	2,870,000	829.10	3,462
Cambodia	Phnom Penh	2,281,951	679.00	3,361
Egypt *	Cairo	10,107,125	3,085.12	3,276
Hungary *	Budapest	1,706,851	525.20	3,250
Mozambique	Maputo	1,124,988	347.69	3,236
Mauritius	Port Louis	147,066	46.70	3,149
Trinidad and Tobago	Port of Spain	37,074	12.00	3,090
Djibouti	Djibouti City	604,013	200.00	3,020
Tunisia	Tunis	638,845	212.00	3,013
Guatemala	Guatemala City	2,934,841	997.00	2,944
Cuba	Havana	2,132,183	728.26	2,928
Guernsey (UK)	Saint Peter Port	18,958	6.50	2,917
Congo	Brazzaville	1,696,392	588.00	2,885
Marshall Islands	Majuro	27,797	9.70	2,866
Kyrgyzstan	Bishkek	1,074,075	386.00	2,783
Estonia *	Tallinn	438,341	159.20	2,753
Barbados	Bridgetown	110,000	40.00	2,750
Czech Republic *	Prague	1,357,326	496.21	2,735
Hong Kong (China)	Hong Kong	7,534,200	2,754.97	2,735
Dominica	Roseau	14,725	5.40	2,727
Luxembourg *	Luxembourg City	136,208	51.46	2,647
Bulgaria *	Sofia	1,307,439	500.00	2,615
Gambia	Banjul	31,301	12.00	2,608
Switzerland *	Bern (de facto)	134,591	51.62	2,607
Isle of Man (UK)	Douglas	27,938	11.00	2,540
Jordan	Amman	4,061,150	1,680.00	2,417
Niger *	Niamey	1,334,984	552.27	2,417
Transnistria	Tiraspol	133,807	55.56	2,408
Lesotho	Maseru	330,760	137.50	2,406
Benin	Porto-Novo	264,320	110.00	2,403
Vietnam	Hanoi	8,053,663	3,358.60	2,398
Palestine	Ramallah (de facto)	38,998	16.30	2,393
Georgia	Tbilisi	1,201,769	504.30	2,383
Saint Kitts and Nevis	Basseterre	14,000	6.10	2,295
Kiribati	Tarawa	70,480	31.02	2,272
Tuvalu	Funafuti	6,320	2.79	2,265
Vanuatu	Port Vila	51,437	23.60	2,180
Zimbabwe	Harare	2,123,132	982.30	2,161
Italy *	Rome	2,761,632	1,287.36	2,145
New Caledonia (France)	Nouméa	94,285	45.70	2,063
Latvia *	Riga	605,802	304.00	1,993
Bosnia and Herzegovina	Sarajevo	275,524	141.50	1,947
Andorra	Andorra la Vella	22,873	12.00	1,906
Kazakhstan *	Astana	1,511,807	810.20	1,866
Montenegro *	Podgorica	190,488	108.00	1,764
Puerto Rico (US)	San Juan	342,259	199.00	1,720
Guyana	Georgetown	118,363	70.00	1,691
Turkmenistan *	Ashgabat	791,000	470.00	1,683
Botswana	Gaborone	273,602	169.00	1,619
Vatican City	Vatican City	764	0.49	1,559
Timor-Leste	Dili	277,279	178.62	1,552
Rwanda	Kigali	1,132,686	730.00	1,552
Cape Verde	Praia	159,050	102.60	1,550
French Polynesia (France)	Papeete	26,926	17.40	1,547
Papua New Guinea *	Port Moresby	364,145	240.00	1,517
Norway *	Oslo	697,010	480.00	1,452
Lithuania	Vilnius	576,195	401.00	1,437
Bahamas	Nassau	274,400	200.00	1,372
Malawi	Lilongwe	989,318	727.79	1,359
China *	Beijing	21,858,000	16,410.50	1,332
Suriname	Paramaribo	240,924	182.00	1,324
Seychelles	Victoria	26,450	20.10	1,316
DR Congo *	Kinshasa	12,691,000	9,965.00	1,274
Aruba (Netherlands)	Oranjestad	28,294	23.00	1,230
Bermuda (UK)	Hamilton	854	0.70	1,220
Croatia *	Zagreb	769,944	641.20	1,201
Slovakia	Bratislava	440,948	367.58	1,200
Mauritania *	Nouakchott	1,195,600	1,000.00	1,196
Cayman Islands (UK)	George Town	34,399	29.00	1,186
Eswatini	Mbabane	94,874	81.76	1,160
Belgium	Brussels	187,686	162.42	1,156
Azerbaijan	Baku	2,303,100	2,140.00	1,076
United Arab Emirates	Abu Dhabi	1,010,092	972.00	1,039
Slovenia *	Ljubljana	285,604	274.99	1,039
Brunei	Bandar Seri Begawan	100,700	100.36	1,003
Falkland Islands (UK)	Stanley	2,460	2.50	984
Honduras	Tegucigalpa	1,444,085	1,502.00	961
North Macedonia	Skopje	544,086	571.46	952
Finland *	Helsinki	658,864	715.48	921
Sahrawi Arab Democratic Republic	Laayoune	217,732	247.80	879
Nigeria	Abuja	1,235,880	1,476.00	837
Libya	Tripoli	1,170,000	1,507.00	776
Saint Barthélemy (France)	Gustavia	2,615	3.40	769
New Zealand *	Wellington	217,000	289.91	749
Dominican Republic	Santo Domingo	1,111,838	1,502.00	740
Belize	Belmopan	20,621	32.78	629
San Marino	City of San Marino	4,061	7.09	573
Åland (Finland)	Mariehamn	11,736	20.75	566
Iceland *	Reykjavík	133,262	244.00	546
Australia *	Canberra	431,380	814.20	530
Panama	Panama City	1,086,990	2,082.00	522
Brazil *	Brasília	2,982,818	5,802.00	514
Albania	Tirana	557,422	1,110.00	502
Nauru	Yaren	747	1.50	498
Kosovo *	Pristina	227,466	523.13	435
American Samoa (USA)	Pago Pago	3,656	8.85	413
Northern Mariana Islands (USA)	Saipan	47,565	118.98	400
Anguilla (UK)	The Valley	1,067	2.72	392
Greenland (Denmark)	Nuuk	18,800	49.00	384
Oman	Muscat	1,294,101	3,500.00	370
Guam (US)	Hagåtña	1,051	3.00	350
Canada *	Ottawa	1,017,449	2,970.30	343
Samoa	Apia	41,611	123.81	336
Liechtenstein	Vaduz	5,774	17.28	334
Mongolia	Ulaanbaatar	1,466,125	4,704.40	312
Saint Lucia	Castries	20,000	79.00	253
Laos	Vientiane	927,724	3,920.00	237
Turkey *	Ankara	5,747,325	25,632.00	224
Saint Pierre and Miquelon (France)	Saint-Pierre	5,394	25.00	216
Turks and Caicos Islands (UK)	Cockburn Town	3,720	17.39	214
Bolivia	Sucre	360,544	1,768.00	204
Cook Islands	Avarua	4,906	28.00	175
Saint Helena (UK)	Jamestown	629	3.60	175
Ivory Coast	Yamoussoukro	361,893	2,075.00	174
Myanmar	Naypyidaw	1,160,242	7,054.00	164
Tanzania	Dodoma	410,956	2,576.00	160
Saint Martin (France)	Marigot	3,229	21.60	149
Faroe Islands * (Denmark)	Tórshavn	22,738	173.00	131
Namibia	Windhoek	431,000	5,133.00	84
Kuwait	Kuwait City	55,159	860.00	64
Cocos (Keeling) Islands (Australia)	West Island	134	6.23	22
Niue	Alofi	597	46.48	13
Pitcairn Islands (UK)	Adamstown	35	4.60	8
Palau	Ngerulmud	0	0.45	0

== See also ==
- Capital city
- List of countries whose capital is not their largest city
- List of capitals outside the territories they serve
- List of national capitals by latitude
- List of countries and dependencies by population
- List of towns and cities with 100,000 or more inhabitants
- List of population concern organizations
- List of national capitals
- List of national capitals by area
