= Capital city =

Seat of government of a country or subnational division

Tokyo, the capital of Japan, and the most populous metropolitan area in the world

A capital city, or just capital, is the municipality holding primary status in a country, state, province, department, or other subnational division, usually as its seat of government. A capital is typically a city that physically encompasses the government's offices and meeting places; the status as capital is often designated by law or a constitution. In some jurisdictions, including several countries, different branches of government are in different settlements, sometimes meaning there are multiple official capitals. In some cases, a distinction is made between the official (constitutional) capital and the seat of government.

English-language media often use the name of the capital metonymically to refer to the government sitting there. For example, "London–Washington relations" is understood to mean diplomatic relations between the United Kingdom and the United States.

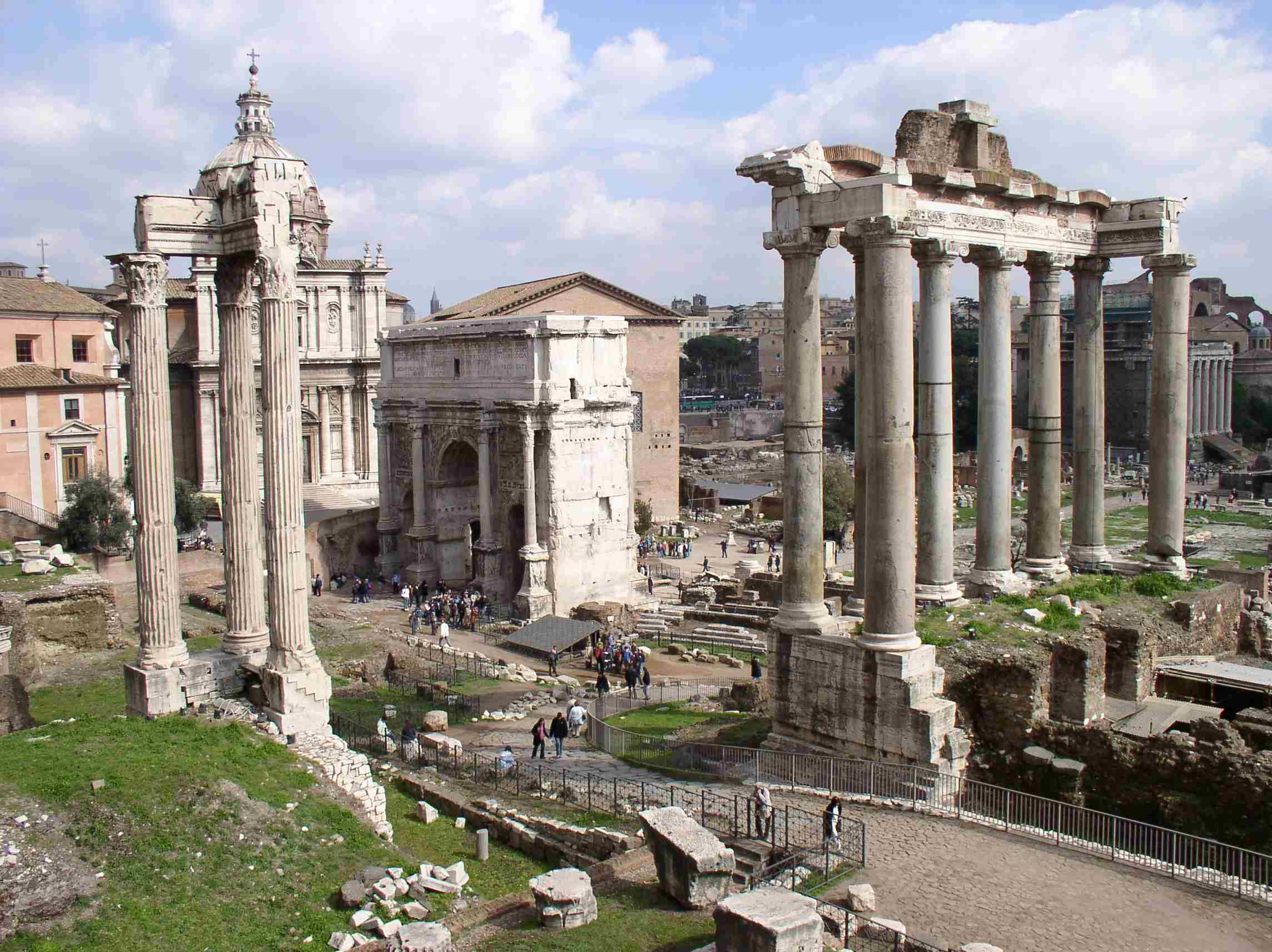
Rome, as the capital of the Roman Empire (and present-day Italy), acquired the nickname of Caput Mundi ('Capital of the world').

== Terminology and etymology ==
The word capital derives from the Latin word caput (genitive capitis), meaning 'head', later borrowed from Medieval Latin capitālis ('of the head'). The Latin phrase Roma Caput Mundi (lit. 'Rome head of the world') was already used by the poet Ovid in the 1st century BC. It originates out of a classical European understanding of the known world: Europe, North Africa, and Southwest Asia. The phrase is related to the enduring power of the city first as the capital of the Republic and the Empire, and later as the centre of the Catholic Church.

In several English-speaking states, the terms county town and county seat are also used in lower administrative divisions. In some unitary states, subnational capitals may be known as 'administrative centres'. The capital is often the largest city of its constituent, though not always.

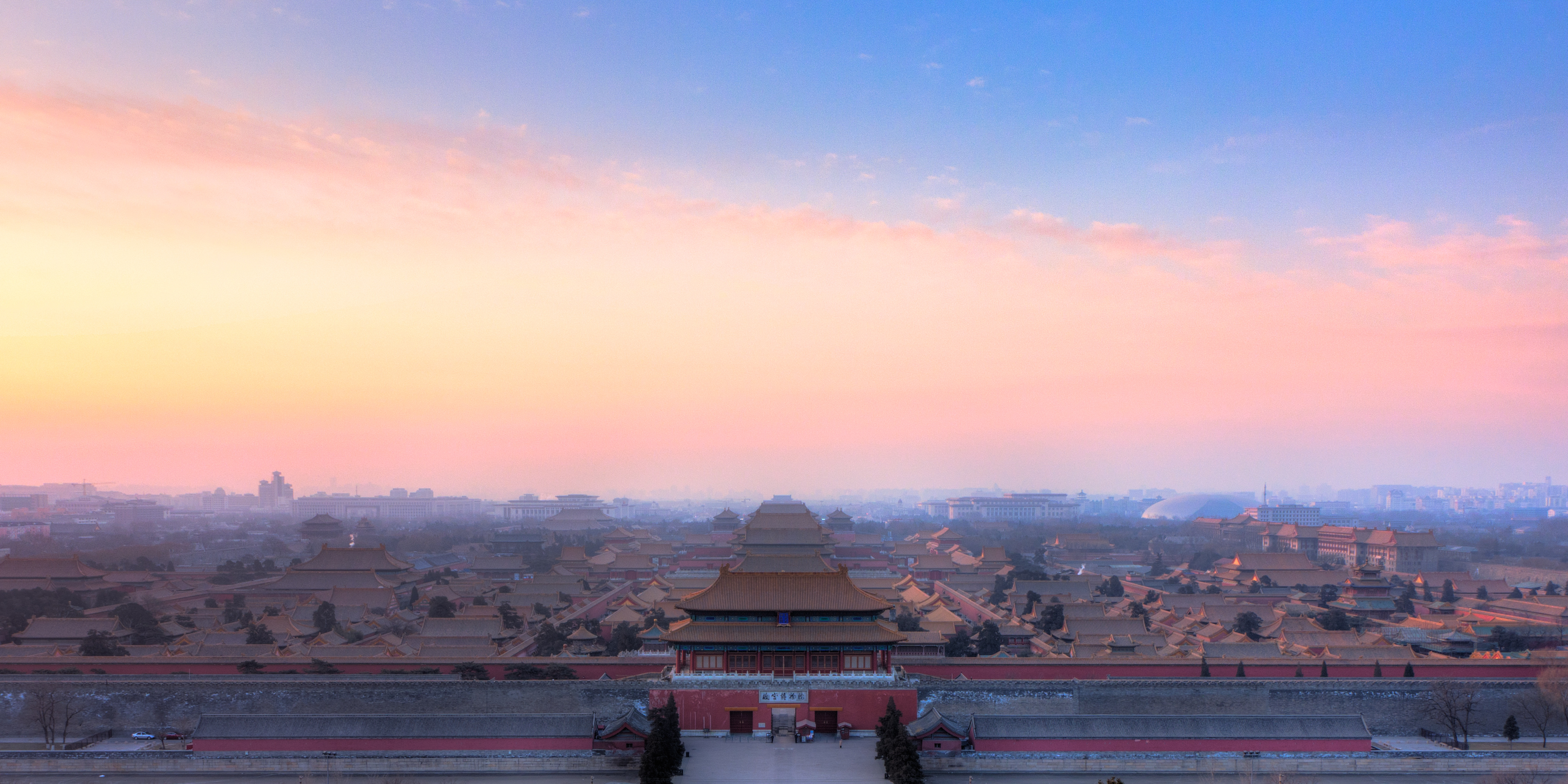
Beijing, as the last of the Four Great Ancient Capitals of China, has served as the country's political centre for most of the past eight centuries.

== Origins ==
Historically, the major economic centre of a state or region has often become the focal point of political power, and became a capital through conquest or federation. Historical examples are ancient Babylon, ancient Athens, ancient Rome, Abbasid Baghdad, Constantinople, Chang'an, and ancient Cusco. The modern capital city has not always existed: in medieval Western Europe, an itinerant (wandering) government was common.

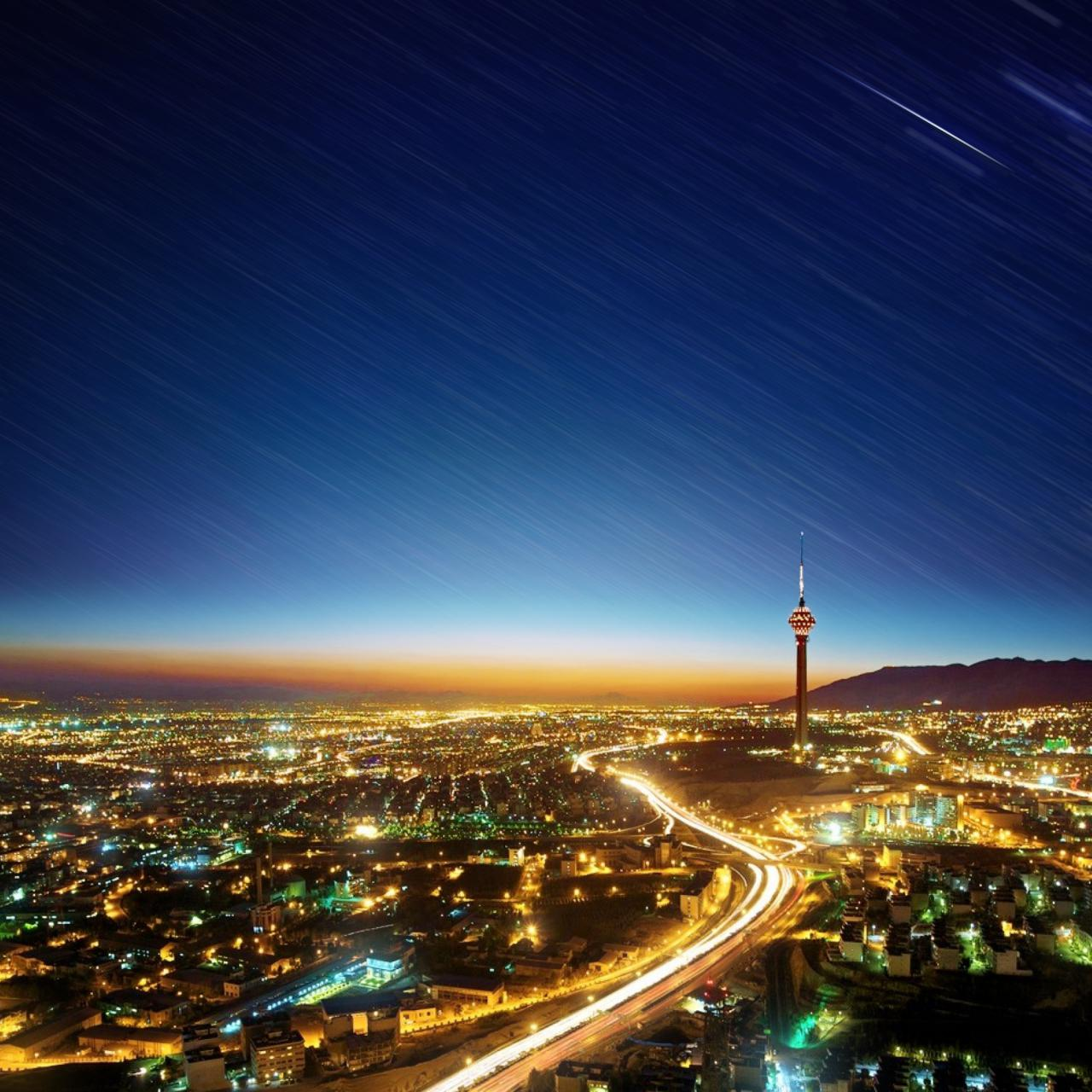
Tehran, the capital of Iran since the Qajar Empire, and the most populous city in West Asia.

The capital city attracts politically motivated people and those whose skills are needed for efficient administration of national or imperial governments, such as lawyers, political scientists, bankers, journalists, and public policy makers. Some of these cities are or were also religious centres, e.g. Constantinople (more than one religion), Rome/Vatican City (the Roman Catholic Church), Jerusalem (more than one religion), Babylon, Moscow (the Russian Orthodox Church), Belgrade (the Serbian Orthodox Church), Paris, and Beijing. In some countries, the capital has been changed for geopolitical reasons; Finland's first city, Turku, which had been the country's most important city since the Middle Ages and became capital in 1809, lost its position during the Grand Duchy of Finland in 1812, when Helsinki was made the current capital of Finland by the Russian Empire.

The convergence of political and economic or cultural power is by no means universal. Traditional capitals may be economically eclipsed by provincial rivals as is the case with Nanjing by Shanghai, Quebec City by Montreal, and several US state capitals. The decline of a dynasty or culture could also mean the extinction of its capital city, as occurred at Babylon and Cahokia. "Political nomadism" was practiced in ancient Near East to increase ties between the ruler and the subjects.

Although many capitals are defined by constitution or legislation, many long-time capitals have no such legal designation, including Bern, Edinburgh, Lisbon, London, Paris, and Wellington. They are recognized as capitals as a matter of convention, and because all or almost all the country's central political institutions, such as government departments, supreme court, legislature, embassies, etc., are located in or near them.

The earliest capital existing is Damascus which has existed since c.2500BC.

== Modern capitals ==
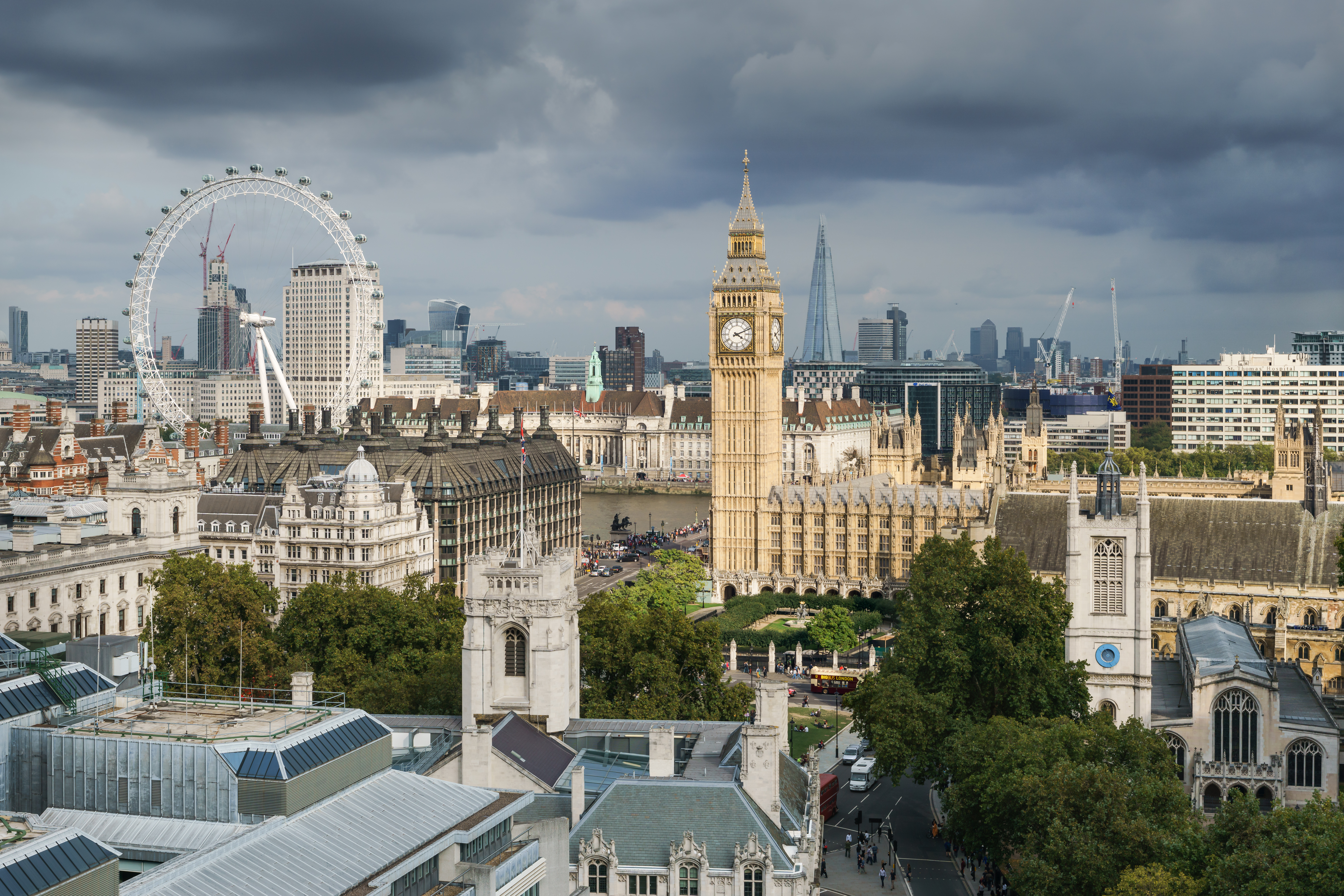
London, the capital of England and the United Kingdom, and the largest metropolitan area in Western Europe

Paris, the capital of France, and the largest metropolitan area in the European Union

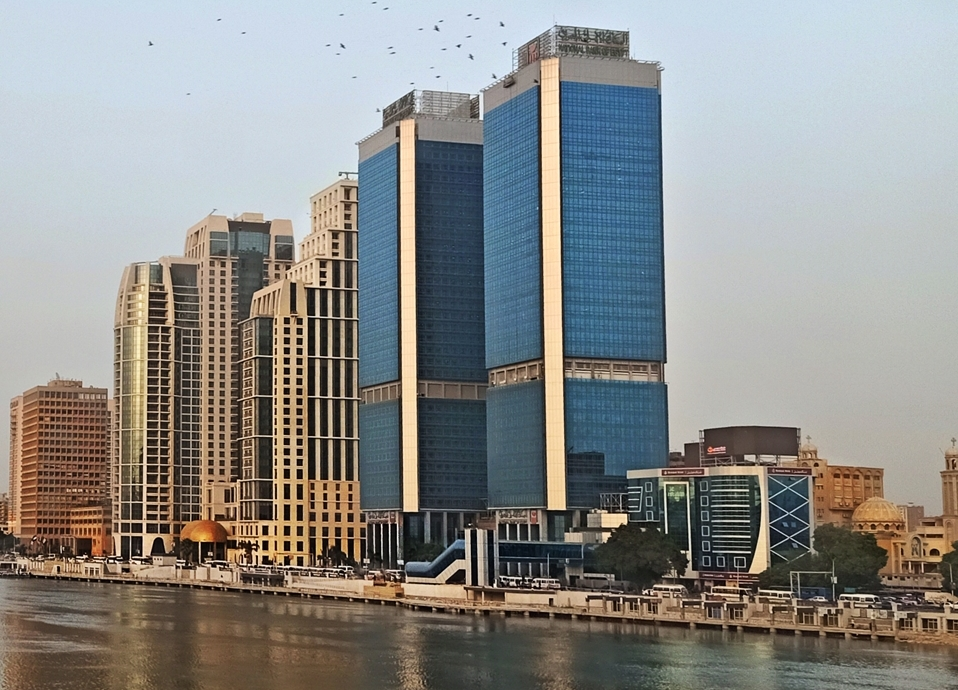
Cairo, the capital of Egypt, and the largest metropolitan area in Africa

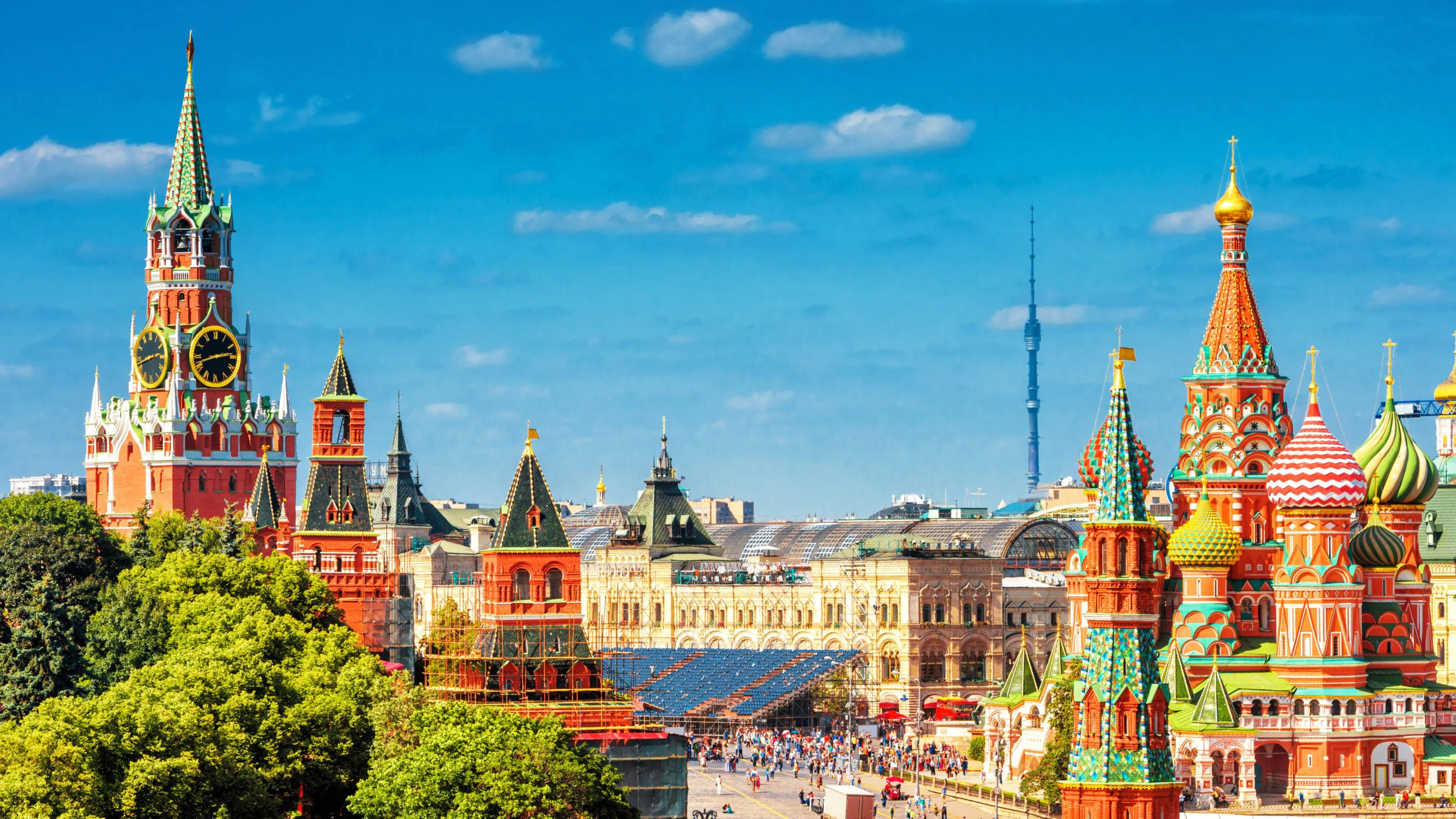
Moscow, the capital of Russia, and the former capital of the Soviet Union

Many modern capital cities are located near the centre of the country, so that they are more accessible to its population and have better protection from possible invasions. The location may also be based on a compromise between two or more cities or other political divisions, historical reasons, or enough land was needed to deliberately build a new planned city for the capital. The majority of national capitals are also the largest city in their respective countries. Modern examples are Berlin, Cairo, London, Madrid, Mexico City, Moscow, Paris, Rome, Jakarta, Metro Manila, Seoul, and Tokyo.

Counties in the United Kingdom have historic county towns, which are often not the largest settlement within the county and often are no longer administrative centres, as many historical counties are now only ceremonial, and administrative boundaries are different. The number of new capitals in the world increased substantially since the Renaissance period, especially with the founding of independent nation-states since the eighteenth century.

In Canada, there is a federal capital, while the ten provinces and three territories each have capital cities. The states of such countries as Mexico, Brazil (including the famous cities of Rio de Janeiro and São Paulo, capitals of their respective states), and Australia also each have capital cities. For example, the six state capitals of Australia are Adelaide, Brisbane, Hobart, Melbourne, Perth, and Sydney. In Australia, the term "capital cities" is regularly used to refer to those six state capitals plus the federal capital Canberra, and Darwin, the capital of the Northern Territory. Abu Dhabi is the capital city of the Emirate of Abu Dhabi and also of the United Arab Emirates overall.

In unitary states which consist of multiple constituent nations, such as the United Kingdom and the Kingdom of Denmark, each will usually have its own capital city. Unlike in federations, there is usually not a separate national capital, but rather the capital city of one constituent nation will also be the capital of the state overall, such as London, which is the capital of England and of the United Kingdom. Similarly, each of the autonomous communities of Spain and regions of Italy has a capital city, such as Seville and Naples, while Madrid is the capital of the Community of Madrid and of the Kingdom of Spain as a whole and Rome is the capital of Italy and of the region of Lazio.

In the Federal Republic of Germany, each of its constituent states (or Länder, plural of Land) has its own capital city, such as Dresden, Wiesbaden, Mainz, Düsseldorf, Stuttgart, and Munich, as do all of the republics of the Russian Federation. The national capitals of Germany and Russia (the Stadtstaat of Berlin and the federal city of Moscow) are also constituent states of both countries in their own right. Each of the states of Austria and cantons of Switzerland also have their own capital cities. Vienna, the national capital of Austria, is also one of the states, while Bern is the (de facto) capital of both Switzerland and of the Canton of Bern.

== Planned capitals ==
L'Enfant Plan in Washington, D.C., the capital of the United States

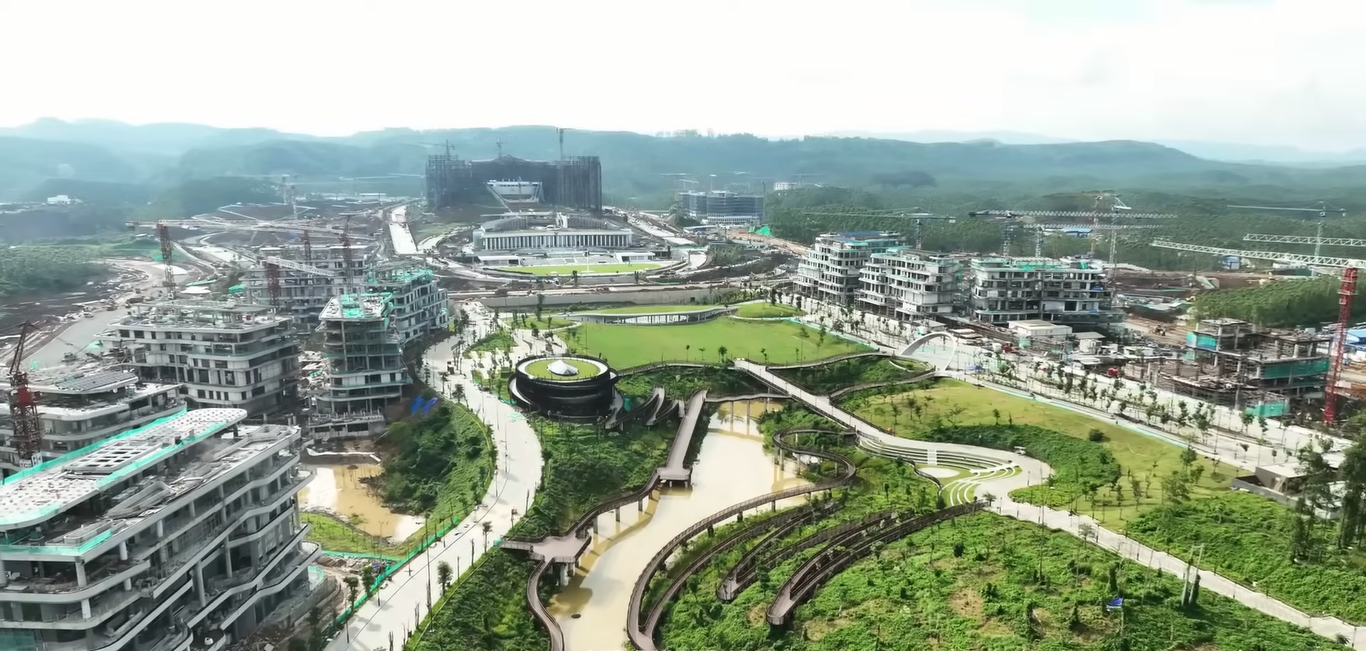
The construction process of the future capital city of Indonesia, namely the city of Nusantara, is currently underway.

Governing entities sometimes plan, design and build new capital cities to house the seat of government of a polity or of a subdivision. Deliberately planned and designed capitals include:

- Abuja, Nigeria (1991)
- Aracaju, Sergipe, Brazil (1855)
- Ankara, Turkey (1923)
- Astana, Kazakhstan (1997)
- Austin, Texas, US (1839)
- Belmopan, Belize (1970)
- Belo Horizonte, Minas Gerais, Brazil (1897)
- Brasília, Brazil (1960)
- Bhubaneswar, Odisha, India (1948)
- Boa Vista, Roraima, Brazil (1890)
- Canberra, Australia (1927)
- Chandigarh, Punjab and Haryana, India (1966)
- Ciudad de la Paz, Equatorial Guinea (2026)
- Columbia, South Carolina, US (1786)
- Constantinople, Roman Empire (330)
- Frankfort, Kentucky, US (1792)
- Gaborone, Botswana (1964)
- Gandhinagar, Gujarat, India (1960)
- Goiânia, Goiás, Brazil (1933)
- Huambo (Nova Lisboa), Huambo, Angola (1912)
- Indianapolis, Indiana, US (1825)
- Islamabad, Pakistan (1960)
- Jefferson City, Missouri, US (1821)
- Karlsruhe, Baden-Durlach (1715)
- La Plata, Buenos Aires Province, Argentina (1882)
- Nava Raipur or Atal Nagar, Chhattisgarh, India (2003)
- Naypyidaw, Myanmar (2005)
- New Delhi, British India (1911)
- Nusantara, Indonesia (2024)
- Oklahoma City, Oklahoma, US (1889)
- Palmas, Tocantins, Brazil (1989)
- Putrajaya, Malaysia (1995)
- Quezon City, Philippines (1948–76)
- Raleigh, North Carolina, US (1792)
- Seoul, Korea (1394)
- Smederevo, Serbian Despotate (1428–1459)
- Soltaniyeh, Ilkhanate (1306–1335)
- Teresina, Piauí, Brazil (1852)
- Valletta, Malta (1571)
- Washington, D.C., US (1800)
- Zhongxing New Village, Nantou County, Taiwan Province, Rep. of China (1956)
- Saint Petersburg, Russian Empire (1703)

These cities satisfy one or both of the following criteria:

1. A deliberately planned city that was built expressly to house the seat of government, superseding a capital city that was in an established population center. There have been various reasons for this, including overcrowding in that major metropolitan area, and the desire to place the capital city in a location with a better climate (usually a less tropical one).
2. A town that was chosen as a compromise among two or more cities (or other political divisions), none of which was willing to concede to the other(s) the privilege of being the capital city. Usually, the new capital is geographically located roughly equidistant between the competing population centres.

=== Compromise locations ===
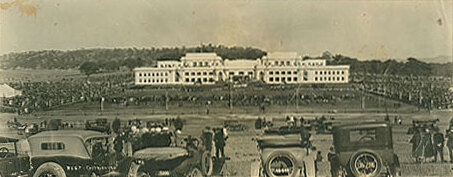
The Australian Parliament opened in the small town of Canberra in 1927 as a compromise between the largest cities, Sydney and Melbourne.

Some examples of the second situation (compromise locations) are:

- Canberra, Australia, chosen as a compromise location between Melbourne and Sydney.
- Washington, D.C., United States, founded as a compromise between more urbanized Northern states and agrarian Southern slave states to share national power. The Compromise of 1790 resulted in the passage of the Residence Act, which approved the creation of a national capital on the Potomac River on land ceded from Maryland and Virginia.
- Frankfort, Kentucky, midway between Louisville and Lexington.
- Ottawa, Ontario, Canada, along the boundary between the two former colonies that formed the core of pre-Confederation Canada: primarily English-speaking Upper Canada and primarily French-speaking Lower Canada. Today, this border separates the two most populous of Canada's ten modern provinces, Ontario and Quebec.
- Tallahassee, Florida, chosen as the midpoint between Pensacola and St. Augustine, Florida's two largest cities at the time.
- Wellington became the capital city of New Zealand in 1865. It lies at the southern tip of the North Island of New Zealand, the smaller of New Zealand's two main islands (which subsequently became the more populous island), immediately across Cook Strait from the South Island. The previous capital, Auckland, lies much further north in the North Island; the move followed a long argument for a more central location for parliament.
- Managua, Nicaragua, chosen to appease rivals in León and Granada, which also were associated with the liberal and conservative political factions respectively.
- Jefferson City, Missouri, was selected as the state capital in 1821, the year after Missouri was admitted to the Union, due to its central location within the state. It is almost halfway between Missouri's two largest cities, Kansas City in the west and St. Louis in the east, although Kansas City was not incorporated until 1850.

Changes in a nation's political regime sometimes result in the designation of a new capital. Akmola (renamed Astana in 1998) became the capital of Kazakhstan in 1997, following the collapse of the Soviet Union in 1991. Naypyidaw was founded in Burma's interior as the former capital, Rangoon, was claimed to be overcrowded.

== Unusual capital city arrangements ==
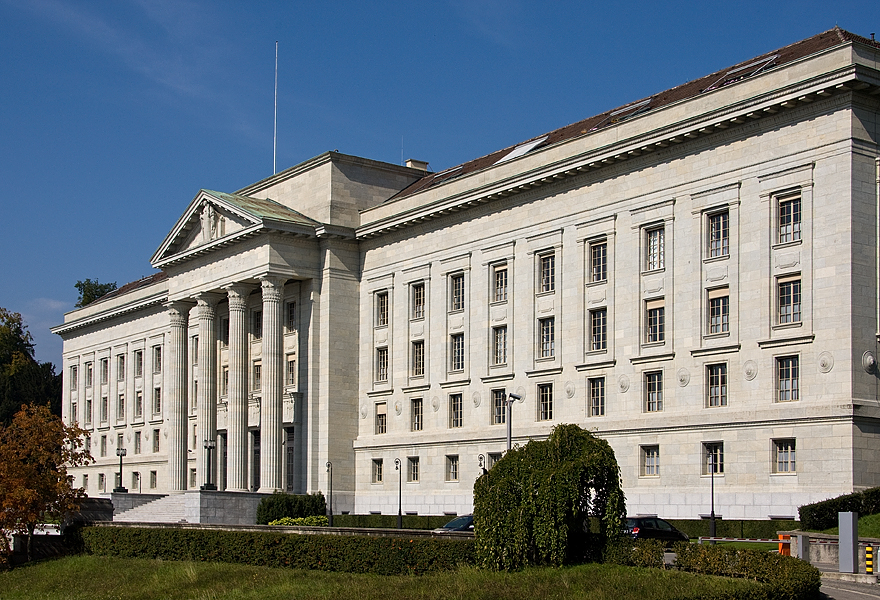
The Supreme Court, the seat of Switzerland's judiciary, is in Lausanne, although the executive and legislature are located in Bern.

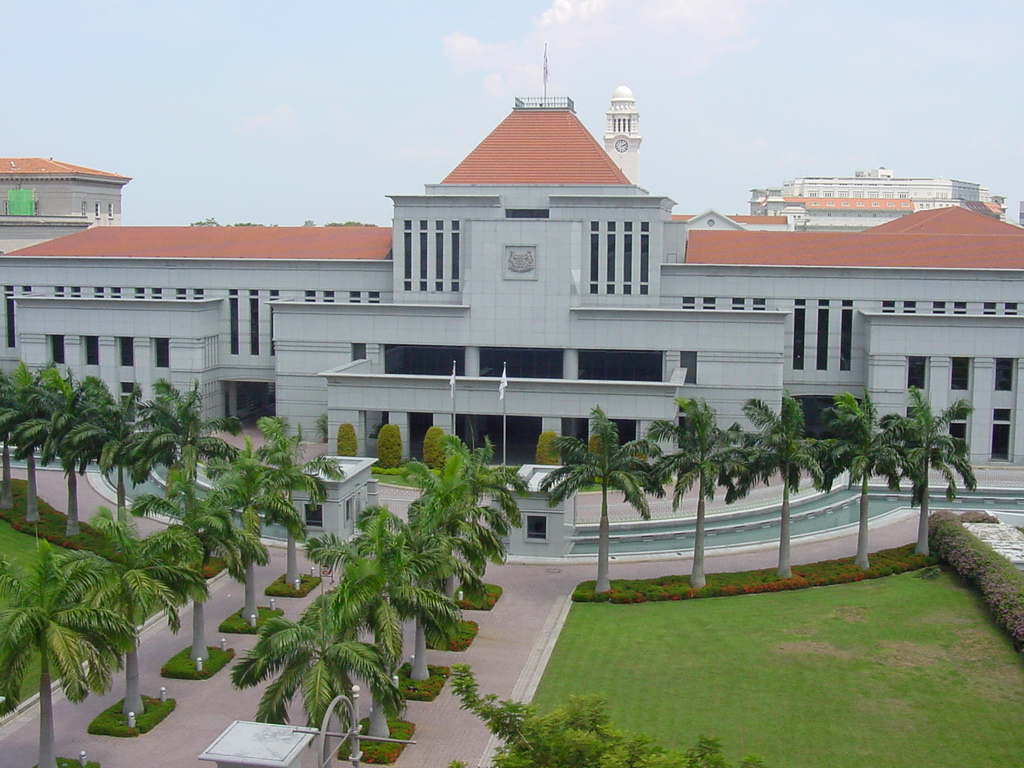
Parliament House in Singapore; as a city-state, Singapore requires no specific capital.

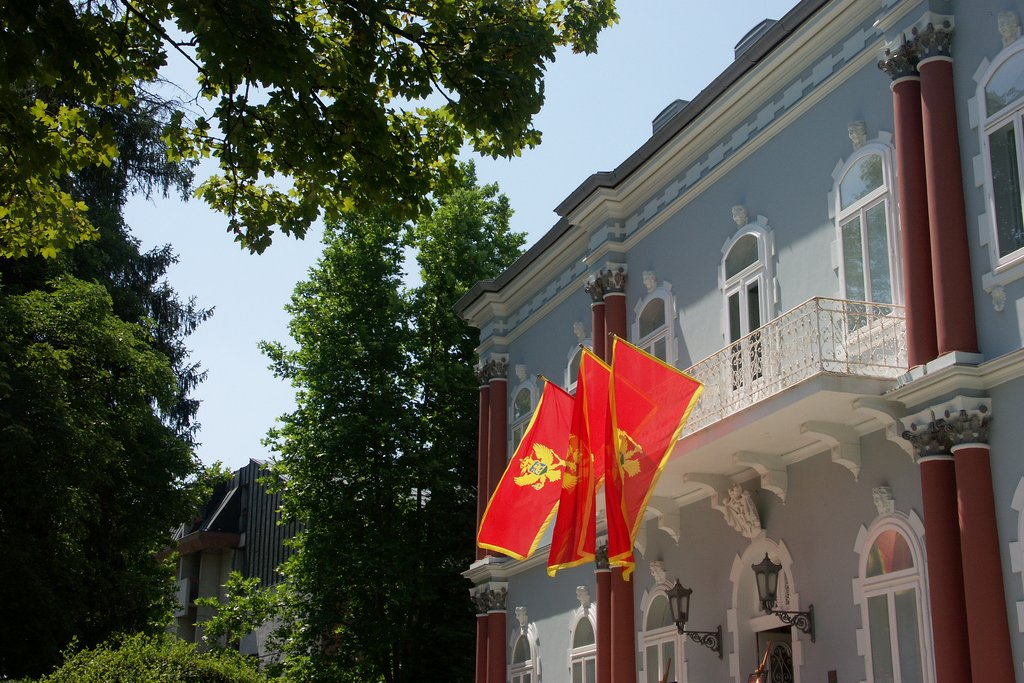
The Blue Palace, the official residence of Montenegro's president, is in Cetinje, although the executive and legislature are located in Podgorica.

A few nation-states have multiple capitals, and there are also several states that have no capital. Some have a city as the capital but with most government agencies elsewhere.

There is also a ghost town which is currently the de jure capital of a territory: Plymouth in Montserrat.

- Belize: Belmopan was designated the national capital of the then British Honduras in 1971, but most government offices and embassies are still located in Belize City.
- Canary Islands (Spain): Until 1927, the capital of the Province of Canarias was Santa Cruz de Tenerife. When the Canary Islands became an autonomous community in 1982, Santa Cruz de Tenerife and Las Palmas de Gran Canaria were both given capital status. There is currently a balance of institutions between the two capitals; the Canary Islands is the only autonomous community in Spain which has two capitals.
- Chile: Santiago is the capital even though the National Congress of Chile meets in Valparaíso.
- Czech Republic: Prague is the capital city, however the Constitutional Court, Supreme Court and Supreme Administrative Court are all located in Brno.
- Estonia: the Supreme Court and the Ministry of Education and Research are located in Tartu.
- France: The French constitution does not recognize any capital city in France. By law Paris is the seat of both houses of Parliament (the National Assembly and the Senate), but their joint congresses are held at the Palace of Versailles. In case of emergency, the seat of the constitutional powers can be transferred to another town, in order for the Houses of Parliament to sit in the same location as the President and Cabinet.
- Germany: The official capital Berlin is home to the parliament and the highest bodies of the executive branch (consisting of the ceremonial presidency and effective chancellery). Various ministries are located in the former West German capital of Bonn, which now has the title "Federal City". The Federal Constitutional Court has its seat in Karlsruhe which, as a consequence, is sometimes called Germany's "judicial capital"; none of Germany's highest judicial organs are located in Berlin. Various German government agencies are located in other parts of Germany.
- India:
  - Andhra Pradesh: Hyderabad was the de jure capital of the state until 2024, while Amaravati is the de facto seat of government since 2014. The Governor of Andhra Pradesh has his official residence in Vijayawada
  - Chhattisgarh: Raipur is the administrative and legislative capital, while the high court (judiciary capital) is located in Bilaspur. The proposed future capital is Nava Raipur.
  - Jammu and Kashmir: Srinagar serves as the summer capital of the state while Jammu is the winter capital. Every six months, the entire state machinery shifts from one city to another.
  - Kerala: Thiruvananthapuram is the administrative and legislative capital of the state, while the high court is located in Ernakulam.
  - Himachal Pradesh: Shimla is the primary capital city. Dharamshala, which is also the headquarters of the Central Tibetan Administration, is the second winter capital of the state.
  - Madhya Pradesh: Bhopal is the administrative and legislative capital of the state, while the high court is located in Jabalpur.
  - Punjab and Haryana: Both states share Chandigarh as their capital city. The city itself is administered as a Union territory.
  - Odisha: Bhubaneswar is the administrative and legislative capital of the state, while the high court is located in Cuttack.
  - Rajasthan: Jaipur is the administrative and legislative capital of the state, while the high court is located in Jodhpur.
  - Uttarakhand: Dehradun is the administrative and legislative capital, while the high court is located in Nainital. The proposed future capital is Gairsain.
  - Ladakh: Leh and Kargil serve as joint capitals of the Union Territory.
- South Korea: Seoul remains as the capital and seat of the government's branches, but many government agencies have moved to Sejong City.
- Malaysia: Kuala Lumpur is the constitutional capital, home of the King, and seat of Parliament, but the federal administrative centre and judiciary have been moved 30 kilometres (19 mi) south to Putrajaya.
- Monaco, Singapore, and the Vatican City are city-states, and thus do not contain any distinct capital city as a whole. However, in Singapore's case, the main judiciary and legislative offices are located in the Downtown Core. Similarly, while Victoria was the capital of colonial Hong Kong, the heart of old Victoria, now known as Central, serves as the seat of government offices today. Vatican City, however, is the religious centre of the Roman Catholic Church and houses the offices and departments of Holy See which serves as the government of both the city-state and worldwide Catholic Church.
- Montenegro: The official capital Podgorica is home to the parliament and the executive, but the seat of the presidency is in the former royal capital of Cetinje.
- Myanmar (Burma): Naypyidaw was designated the national capital in 2005, the same year it was founded, but most government offices and embassies are still located in Yangon (Rangoon).
- Nauru: Nauru, a microstate of only 21 square kilometres (8.1 sq mi), has no distinct capital city, but has a capital district instead.
- Philippines:
  - National capital: Presidential Decree No. 940, issued on 24 June 1976, designates the whole of National Capital Region (NCR) or Metro Manila as the seat of government, with the City of Manila as the country's capital. Some national government institutions and agencies are located within the Manila capital city, while others are scattered on other parts of the metropolitan area. The presidential palace (Malacañang Palace, serving as the seat of the President of the Philippines) and the Supreme Court are located within the capital city while the two houses of Congress are located outside the capital Manila but within the metropolis of the same name.
  - Cavite: Imus is designated as the provincial capital, while government offices are in Trece Martires.
- Portugal:
  - National capital: the Portuguese constitution has no reference to a capital. Although Lisbon is home to the Parliament, the President's and the Prime Minister's official residences, all the Government's departments, all the embassies and the highest courts, no Portuguese official document states that Lisbon is the national capital.
  - Azores: since the establishment of local autonomy in 1976, the Azores has three designated regional capital cities: Ponta Delgada at São Miguel Island (seat of the Autonomous Government); Horta at Faial Island (seat of the Legislative Assembly); and Angra do Heroísmo at Terceira Island (seat of the judiciary and the historical capital of the Azores, in addition to being the seat of the Roman Catholic Diocese of Angra).
- Sri Lanka: Sri Jayawardenepura Kotte is designated the administrative capital and the location of the parliament, while the former capital, Colombo, is now designated as the "commercial capital". However, many government offices are still located in Colombo. Both cities are in the Colombo District.
- South Africa: The administrative capital is Pretoria, the legislative capital is Cape Town, and the judicial capital is Bloemfontein. This is the outcome of the compromise that created the Union of South Africa in 1910. Despite Bloemfontein's status as the judicial capital, the country's highest court, the Constitutional Court of South Africa, sits in its largest city, Johannesburg.
- Switzerland: Bern is the Federal City of Switzerland and functions as de facto capital. However, the Swiss Supreme Court is located in Lausanne which is also the Olympic Capital.
  - Canton of Zürich: Zürich is the de facto capital of the canton, but the cantonal constitution makes no mention of a capital city.
- Tanzania: Dodoma was designated the national capital in 1996, but some of the government offices and almost all embassies are still located in Dar es Salaam.
- United States:
  - California: The state executive and legislative branches and most government agencies are based in Sacramento but the California Supreme Court is headquartered in San Francisco with secondary meeting places in Sacramento and Los Angeles.
  - Illinois: Springfield has the seats of the branches of state government and serves as the official state capital. However various Illinois government officials primarily reside in or are primarily active in Chicago. (see: Government of Illinois § Capital for a further explanation)
  - Louisiana: The state executive and legislative branches and most government agencies are based in Baton Rouge, but the Louisiana Supreme Court is located in New Orleans.
  - New York: The state capital and government are headquartered in Albany, but many officials are mostly active in or live in New York City.
  - Pennsylvania: The state capital is Harrisburg but each one of the state Supreme Court and its two appellate courts holds hearings in the three cities of Harrisburg, Philadelphia, and Pittsburgh. Also, most statewide elected officials and officers who are based in Southeast Pennsylvania (City of Philadelphia, Bucks County, Montgomery County, Delaware County, and Chester County) prefer working mostly in Philadelphia.

=== Capitals that are not the seat of government ===
There are several countries where, for various reasons, the official capital and seat of government are separated:

- Benin: Porto-Novo is the official capital, but Cotonou is the seat of government.
- Bolivia: Sucre is the constitutional capital, and the Supreme Court of Justice is located in Sucre, making it the judicial capital. The Palacio Quemado, the Plurinational Legislative Assembly and Plurinational Electoral Organ are located in La Paz, making it the seat of government.
- Ivory Coast: Yamoussoukro was designated the national capital in 1983, but most government offices and embassies are still located in Abidjan.
- Netherlands: Amsterdam is the constitutional national capital even though the Cabinet of the Netherlands, the States General of the Netherlands, the High Council of the Netherlands, the Council of State, and the Noordeinde Palace of the King are all located in The Hague, as are all the embassies. (For more details see: Capital of the Netherlands.)

Some historical examples of similar arrangements, where the recognized capital was not the official seat of government:

- Kingdom of England: The traditional capital was the City of London, while Westminster, outside of the boundaries of the City of London, was the seat of government. They are both today part of the urban core of Greater London.
- Kingdom of France: The traditional capital was Paris, though from 1682 to 1789 the seat of government was at the Palace of Versailles, located in a rural area southwest of Paris.

=== Disputed capitals ===
- Cyprus and Northern Cyprus: Nicosia, "the last divided capital", is divided in two by the United Nations Buffer Zone in Cyprus (Green Line). Both the Republic of Cyprus, which has de facto control of the south, and the largely unrecognized Turkish Republic of Northern Cyprus, which has de facto control of North Nicosia, claim the entire city as their capital.
- Israel and Palestine: Both the Government of Israel and the Palestinian Authority claim Jerusalem as their capital. Jerusalem serves as Israel's capital, with the presidential residence, government offices, supreme court and parliament (Knesset) located there, while the Palestinian Authority has no de facto or de jure control over any of Jerusalem. Many countries, with the notable exception of the United States, which recognizes Jerusalem as the capital of Israel, take the position that the final status of Jerusalem is unsettled pending future negotiations. Most countries maintain their diplomatic missions to Israel in Tel Aviv, while diplomatic missions to Palestine are in various places such as Ramallah, Gaza City, Cairo and Damascus.

== Capital as symbol ==
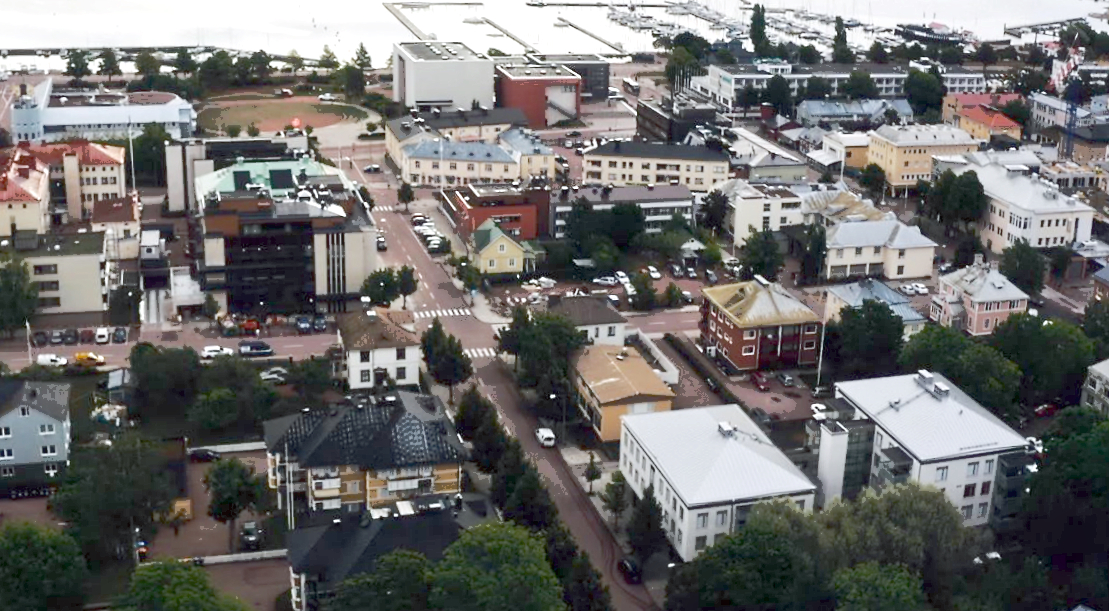
Mariehamn, capital city of Åland, a demilitarized archipelago with self-governance

With the rise of the modern nation-state, the capital city has become a symbol for the state and its government, and imbued with political meaning. Unlike medieval capitals, which were declared wherever a monarch held their court, the selection, relocation, founding, or capture of a modern capital city is a highly symbolic event. For example:

- The ruined and almost uninhabited Athens was made capital of newly independent Greece in 1834, four years after the country gained its independence, with the romantic notion of reviving the glory of Ancient Greece. Similarly, following the Cold War and German reunification, Berlin once again became the capital of Germany. Other restored capital cities include Moscow after the October Revolution.
- A symbolic relocation of a capital city to a geographically or demographically peripheral location may be for either economic or strategic reasons (sometimes known as a forward capital or spearhead capital). Peter the Great moved his government from Moscow to Saint Petersburg to give the Russian Empire a European orientation. The economically significant city of Nafplio became the first capital of Greece, when Athens was an unimportant village. The Ming emperors moved their capital to Beijing from the more central Nanjing to help supervise the border with the Mongols. During the 1857 rebellion, Indian rebels considered Delhi their capital, and Bahadur Shah Zafar was proclaimed emperor, but the ruling British had their capital in Calcutta. In 1877, the British formally held a 'Durbar' in Delhi, proclaiming Queen Victoria as 'Empress of India'. Delhi finally became the colonial capital after the Coronation Durbar of King-Emperor George V in 1911; the building of New Delhi in Delhi led to New Delhi as the capital and continued as independent India's capital from 1947 today making it a part of the National Capital Region. Other examples include Abuja, Astana, Brasília, Helsinki, Islamabad, Naypyidaw, and Yamoussoukro.
- The selection or founding of a "neutral" capital city, one unencumbered by regional or political identities, was meant to represent the unity of a new state when Ankara, Bern, Brasília, Canberra, Madrid, Ottawa and Washington became capital cities. Sometimes, the location of a new capital city was chosen to terminate actual or potential squabbling between various entities, such as in the cases of Brasília, Canberra, Ottawa, Washington, Wellington and Managua.
- The British-built town of New Delhi represented a simultaneous break and continuity with the past, the location of Delhi being where many imperial capitals were built (Indraprastha, Dhillika, and Shahjahanabad) but the actual capital being the new British-built town designed by Edwin Lutyens.
- Wellington, on the southwestern tip of the North Island of New Zealand, replaced the much more northerly city of Auckland to place the national capital close to the South Island and hence to placate its residents, many of whom had sympathies with separatism.
- During the American Civil War, tremendous resources were expended to defend Washington, D.C., which bordered on the Confederate States of America (with the Commonwealth of Virginia), from Confederate attack even though the relatively small federal government could easily have been moved elsewhere. Likewise, great resources were expended by the Confederacy in defending the Confederate capital from attack by the Union, in its exposed location of Richmond, Virginia, barely 100 miles (160 km) south of Washington, D.C.
- Two national capitals refer to another sovereign state. The name of Tallinn, the capital of Estonia, is thought to be derived from Taani linn, originally meaning "Danish Castle" and now "Danish Town" in Estonian, named after the Toompea Castle, which Denmark controlled in 1219–1227, 1238–1332 and in 1340–1346. Port of Spain, the capital of Trinidad and Tobago, was named so in Spanish by the first settlers from Spain in the 16th century. See List of national capital city name etymologies for more.

== Capitals in military strategy ==
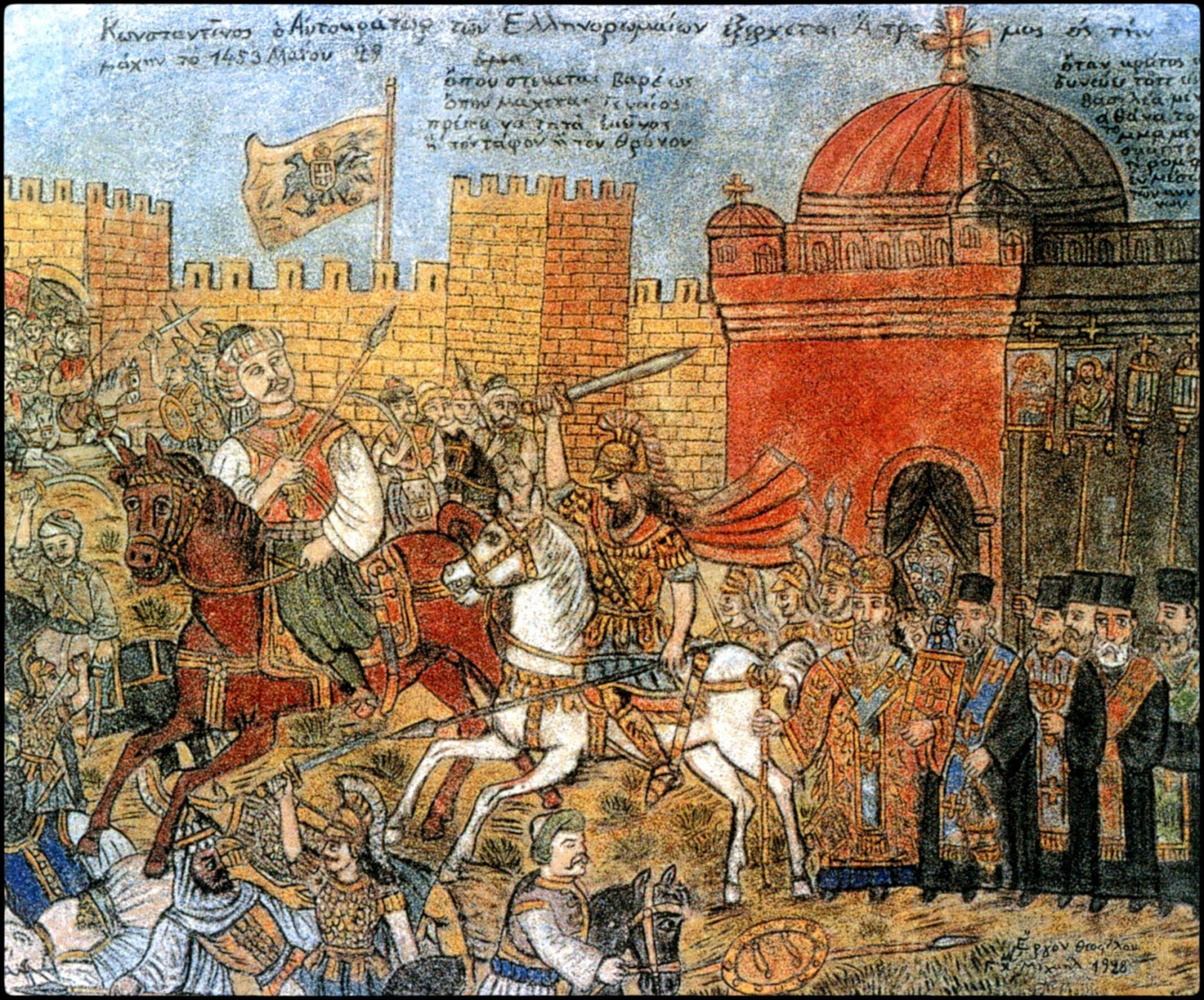
Constantinople, the capital of the Byzantine Empire, was the final part of the empire to fall to the Ottoman Turks due to its strong defences.

The capital city is usually but not always a primary target in a war, as capturing it usually guarantees capture of much of the enemy government, victory for the attacking forces, or at the very least demoralization for the defeated forces.

In ancient China, where governments were massive centralized bureaucracies with little flexibility on the provincial level, a dynasty could easily be toppled with the fall of its capital. In the Three Kingdoms period, both Shu and Wu fell when their respective capitals of Chengdu and Jianye fell. The Ming dynasty relocated its capital from Nanjing to Beijing, where they could more effectively control the generals and troops guarding the borders from Mongols and Manchus. The Ming was destroyed when Li Zicheng took their seat of power, and this pattern repeats itself in Chinese history, until the fall of the traditional Confucian monarchy in the 20th century. After the Qing dynasty's collapse, decentralization of authority and improved transportation and communication technologies allowed both the Chinese Nationalists and Chinese Communists to rapidly relocate capitals and keep their leadership structures intact during the great crisis of Japanese invasion.

National capitals were arguably less important as military objectives in other parts of the world, including the West, because of socioeconomic trends toward localized authority, a strategic modus operandi especially popular after the development of feudalism and reaffirmed by the development of democratic and capitalistic philosophies. In 1204, after the Latin Crusaders captured the Byzantine capital, Constantinople, Byzantine forces were able to regroup in several provinces; provincial noblemen managed to reconquer the capital after 60 years and preserve the empire for another 200 years after that. The British forces sacked various American capitals repeatedly during the Revolutionary War and War of 1812, but American forces could still carry on fighting from the countryside, where they enjoyed support from local governments and the traditionally independent civilian frontiersmen. Exceptions to these generalizations include highly centralized states such as France, whose centralized bureaucracies could effectively coordinate far-flung resources, giving the state a powerful advantage over less coherent rivals, but risking utter ruin if the capital were taken.

== See also ==
- Capital region
- Lists of capital cities
- List of national capitals by population
- List of countries whose capital is not their largest city
- List of countries with multiple capitals
- Primate city
- Temporary capital
