= Ngerulmud =

Capital city of Palau

- Capital
- Capitol of Palau

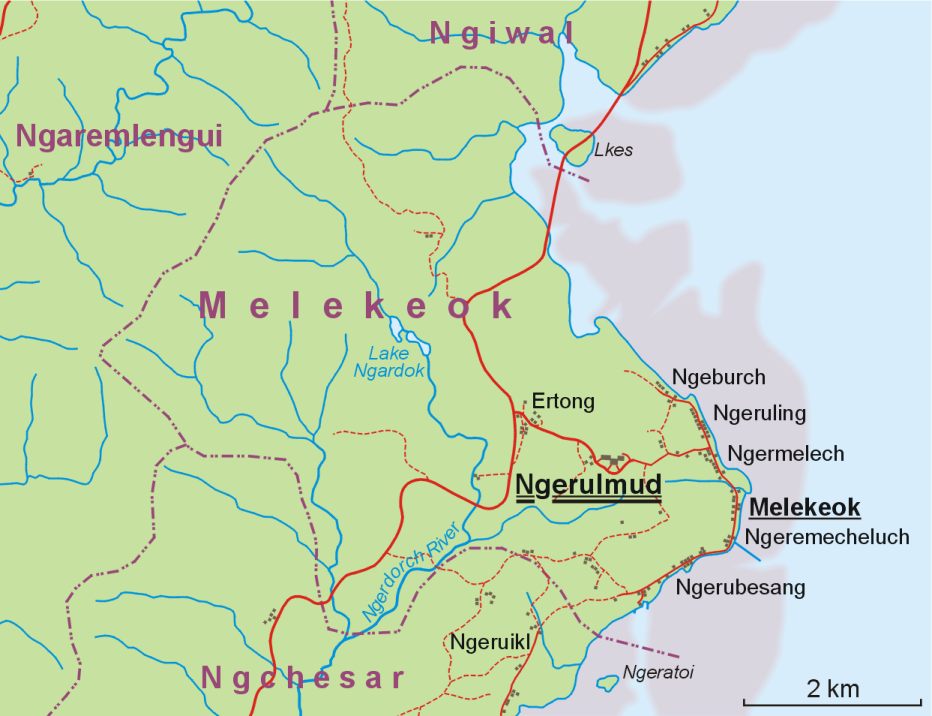
- Location within Melekeok State

- Location in Palau Ngerulmud (Oceania)
- Coordinates: 7°30′01″N 134°37′27″E
- Country: Palau
- State: Melekeok

Area
  - Land: 0.45 km^{2} (0.17 sq mi)
- Elevation: 81 m (266 ft)

Population (2024)
  - Total: 0: Melekeok State: 318 (2020 census)
  - Density: 0.0/km^{2} (0.0/sq mi)
- Time zone: UTC+9:00 (PWT)
- ZIP code: 96939
- Area code: (+680) 654

Ngerulmud (Palauan pronunciation: [ŋəˈɾulmuð]) is the seat of government of the Republic of Palau, an island nation in the Pacific Ocean. It replaced Koror City as the capital in October 2006. The settlement is located in the state of Melekeok on Babeldaob, the country's largest island, located 20 kilometers (12 miles) northeast of Koror City and 2 km (1 mile) northwest of the village of Melekeok. With no permanent fixed population, it is the least-populous capital city of a sovereign nation in the world.

== Etymology ==
Ngerulmud is derived from a Palauan phrase meaning "place of fermented angelfish", referring to the hill overlooking the ocean that dominates the site. The last syllable, mud, is the Palauan word for Centropyge tibicen, also known as the keyhole angelfish. In the past, under a local tradition, women gathered on the hill to offer fermented angelfish to the gods.

== History ==
The previous capital of Palau was located provisionally in Koror. The Constitution of Palau, ratified in 1979, directed the National Congress to establish a permanent capital in Babeldaob within ten years of the constitution's effective date. The new capital's planning began in 1986, when a contract for the construction of the capitol complex was assigned to a Hawaii-based architecture firm, Architects Hawaii Ltd. (AHL), which had previously designed the capitol complex of the Federated States of Micronesia, located at Palikir. Progress was slow, as Palau lacked engineers and architects, and most of the construction materials had to be imported.

Further work was not begun until the early 2000s when Palau secured a $20 million loan from Taiwan as part of efforts to enhance relations between the two countries and secure Palau's diplomatic recognition of Taiwan. Containing separate buildings for the Olbiil era Kelulau (the country's legislature), and also the judicial and executive branches, connected via a central open plaza, the complex cost over 45 million US$, and it was officially opened on 7 October 2006, with over 5,000 people in attendance. Government officials moved their offices from Koror to Ngerulmud shortly after.

A 2013 piece in The Wall Street Journal reported that the capitol building, which was "unsuited to the local climate", had put Palau in debt, and a fault in the ventilation system had recently caused a mold infestation. In April 2013, Ngerulmud's post office was closed permanently, as part of cost-cutting measures implemented by the postmaster, Tommy Sinsak. It had been established in December 2011, following an Olbiil era Kelulau resolution, and was one of only two in the country (the other being in Koror). During its 16 months of operation, expenses had exceeded US$30,000, while revenues, mainly from stamps, were less than $2,000. Ngerulmud is the only settlement in Palau to have its own ZIP code (96939), with the rest of the country using 96940 – the United States Postal Service services Palau as part of the Compact of Free Association with the United States.

In July 2014, Ngerulmud hosted the official opening of the 45th Pacific Islands Forum. However, the majority of events at the forum were held in Koror, with the leader's retreat held in Peleliu State. In February 2016, Ngerulmud hosted the 16th Micronesian Presidents' Summit, which was attended by the presidents of Palau, the Marshall Islands, and the Federated States of Micronesia.

== Geography ==
=== Climate ===
Climate data for Ngerulmud (1985~2015)
Month	Jan	Feb	Mar	Apr	May	Jun	Jul	Aug	Sep	Oct	Nov	Dec	Year
Mean daily maximum °C (°F)	31 (88)	31 (88)	32 (90)	32 (90)	32 (90)	31 (88)	31 (88)	31 (88)	31 (88)	32 (90)	32 (90)	32 (90)	32 (89)
Daily mean °C (°F)	28 (82)	28 (82)	28 (82)	28 (82)	28 (82)	28 (82)	28 (82)	28 (82)	28 (82)	28 (82)	28 (82)	28 (82)	28 (82)
Mean daily minimum °C (°F)	24 (75)	24 (75)	24 (75)	25 (77)	25 (77)	24 (75)	24 (75)	24 (75)	24 (75)	25 (77)	25 (77)	24 (75)	24 (76)
Average rainfall mm (inches)	189.2 (7.45)	168.5 (6.63)	132.6 (5.22)	148.6 (5.85)	263.7 (10.38)	326.6 (12.86)	323.4 (12.73)	254.6 (10.02)	222.2 (8.75)	204.1 (8.04)	211.9 (8.34)	221.8 (8.73)	2,667.2 (105)
Average relative humidity (%)	83	82	81	82	84	85	84	83	82	83	84	84	83
Source: Time and Date

== Population ==
Population statistics are not recorded separately for Ngerulmud, as it has no defined borders and consists solely of government buildings. At the 2020 national census, the state of Melekeok, in which Ngerulmud is located, had a population of 318 people, making it one of the least-populated national capitals or seats of government.

== See also ==
- List of purpose-built national capitals
