= List of national capitals =

This is a list of national capitals, including capitals of territories and dependencies, non-sovereign states including associated states and entities whose sovereignty is disputed.

The capitals included on this list are those associated with states or territories listed by the international standard ISO 3166-1, or that are included in the list of states with limited recognition.

Sovereign states and observer states within the United Nations are shown in bold text.

== List ==
The column headings may cover the first row when the letter links are used.

City/Town	Country/Territory	Continent	Notes
Abidjan (former capital; still hosts some government offices)	**Ivory Coast** (Côte d'Ivoire)	Africa	Abidjan is the largest city in Ivory Coast and is officially designated as the economic capital.
Yamoussoukro (de jure)	**Ivory Coast** (Côte d'Ivoire)	Africa	Abidjan is the largest city in Ivory Coast and is officially designated as the economic capital.
Abu Dhabi	**United Arab Emirates**	Asia	
Abuja	**Nigeria**	Africa	Lagos was the capital from 1914 to 1991.
Accra	**Ghana**	Africa	
Adamstown	Pitcairn Islands	Oceania	British Overseas Territory.
Addis Ababa	**Ethiopia**	Africa	
Aden (de facto, temporary)	**Yemen**	Asia	Yemen is in a state of civil war, and Sanaa has been occupied by Houthi rebels since September 2014. Aden, the former capital of South Yemen, has since acted as provisional capital of the internationally-recognized government, though that government's leadership reportedly departed the city amid a December 2025 takeover by its separatist faction.
Sanaa (de jure)	**Yemen**	Asia	Yemen is in a state of civil war, and Sanaa has been occupied by Houthi rebels since September 2014. Aden, the former capital of South Yemen, has since acted as provisional capital of the internationally-recognized government, though that government's leadership reportedly departed the city amid a December 2025 takeover by its separatist faction.
Episkopi Cantonment	Akrotiri and Dhekelia	Asia	British Overseas Territory.
Algiers	**Algeria**	Africa	
Alofi	Niue	Oceania	Self-governing in free association with New Zealand. Government offices are spread across both Alofi North and Alofi South.
Amman	**Jordan**	Asia	
Amsterdam (official)	**Netherlands**	Europe	The Hague hosts the monarch, government ministries, judiciary and diplomatic missions. See also Capital of the Netherlands.
The Hague (de facto)	**Netherlands**	Europe	The Hague hosts the monarch, government ministries, judiciary and diplomatic missions. See also Capital of the Netherlands.
Andorra la Vella	**Andorra**	Europe	
Ankara	**Turkey**	Asia	Ankara became capital of the newly-formed Republic of Turkey in 1923, after the Turkish War of Independence. The capital of Turkey's predecessor, the Ottoman Empire, was Constantinople (now Istanbul).
Antananarivo	**Madagascar**	Africa	
Apia	**Samoa**	Oceania	
Ashgabat	**Turkmenistan**	Asia	
Asmara	**Eritrea**	Africa	
Astana	**Kazakhstan**	Asia	Astana was named Nur-Sultan from 2019 to 2022. Almaty was the capital of Kazakhstan from 1991 to 1997 and its predecessor the Kazakh SSR from 1929 to 1991.
Asunción	**Paraguay**	South America	
Atafu (atoll administration)	Tokelau	Oceania	Most populous city and smallest atoll. New Zealand owns Tokelau.
Nukunonu (atoll administration)	Tokelau	Oceania	Largest atoll. The population of people living there is 531.
Fakaofo (atoll administration)	Tokelau	Oceania	Most populous city in this atoll is Fale, Tokelau
Athens	**Greece**	Europe	
Avarua	Cook Islands	Oceania	Self-governing in free association with New Zealand. The capital is sometimes incorrectly stated as Rarotonga, the island on which Avarua is located.
Baghdad	**Iraq**	Asia	
Baku	**Azerbaijan**	Asia/Europe	
Bamako	**Mali**	Africa	
Bandar Seri Begawan	**Brunei**	Asia	
Bangkok	**Thailand**	Asia	
Bangui	**Central African Republic**	Africa	
Banjul	**Gambia**	Africa	
Basseterre	**Saint Kitts and Nevis**	North America	
Basse-Terre	Guadeloupe	North America	Overseas department and region of France.
Beijing	**China**	Asia	See also: Historical capitals of China.
Beirut	**Lebanon**	Asia	
Belgrade	**Serbia**	Europe	
Belmopan	**Belize**	North America	Belize City was the capital of Belize's predecessor, British Honduras.
Berlin	**Germany**	Europe	Bonn was the capital of West Germany and remained the seat of government for reunified Germany until 1999, and is still the primary seat of six ministries. See also Capital of Germany.
Bern (de facto)	**Switzerland**	Europe	
Bishkek	**Kyrgyzstan**	Asia	
Bissau	**Guinea-Bissau**	Africa	
Bloemfontein (judicial)	**South Africa**	Africa	
Cape Town (legislative)	**South Africa**	Africa	
Pretoria (executive)	**South Africa**	Africa	
Bogotá	**Colombia**	South America	
Brades (de facto)	Montserrat	North America	British Overseas Territory. Plymouth was abandoned after the Soufrière Hills volcano erupted in 1997. Since then, government offices have been moved to Brades, which is in northwestern Montserrat. A new capital, Little Bay, is currently under construction.
Plymouth (de jure)	Montserrat	North America	British Overseas Territory. Plymouth was abandoned after the Soufrière Hills volcano erupted in 1997. Since then, government offices have been moved to Brades, which is in northwestern Montserrat. A new capital, Little Bay, is currently under construction.
Brasília	**Brazil**	South America	Rio de Janeiro was the capital until 1960. See also: Capitals of Brazil.
Bratislava	**Slovakia**	Europe	
Brazzaville	**Congo**	Africa	
Bridgetown	**Barbados**	North America	
Brussels	**Belgium**	Europe	
Brussels	European Union (de facto)	Europe	
Bucharest	**Romania**	Europe	
Budapest	**Hungary**	Europe	See also: List of historical capitals of Hungary.
Buenos Aires	**Argentina**	South America	
Cairo	**Egypt**	Africa	A new capital is being built at the New Capital. It might be named Egypt. See also: List of historical capitals of Egypt.
Canberra	**Australia**	Oceania	Planned city built to mitigate the rivalry between Melbourne (de facto capital at the time) and Sydney (economic capital and most populous city), both of which were put forward as potential capitals in the Australasia Federation Conventions of the 1890s. Section 125 of the Constitution gives basic details about the location of the capital, size of the encompassing territory and so forth, while the Seat of Government Act 1908 specified its precise location.
Caracas	**Venezuela**	South America	
Castries	**Saint Lucia**	North America	
Cayenne	French Guiana	South America	Overseas department, region and single territorial collectivity of France.
Charlotte Amalie	United States Virgin Islands	North America	Territory of the United States.
Chișinău	**Moldova**	Europe	
Ciudad de la Paz	**Equatorial Guinea**	Africa	Malabo was the capital until 2026.
Cockburn Town	Turks and Caicos Islands	North America	British Overseas Territory.
Colombo (executive, judicial)	**Sri Lanka**	Asia	Until 1982, the capital was Colombo, where many governmental institutions remain; it is still designated as the commercial capital of Sri Lanka. See also: Capital of Sri Lanka.
Sri Jayawardenepura Kotte (official)	**Sri Lanka**	Asia	Also known as Kotte, the city is a suburb of Colombo.
Conakry	**Guinea**	Africa	
Copenhagen	**Denmark**	Europe	
Cotonou (de facto)	**Benin**	Africa	
Porto-Novo (official)	**Benin**	Africa	
Dakar	**Senegal**	Africa	
Damascus	**Syria**	Asia	
Dhaka	**Bangladesh**	Asia	
Dili	**East Timor**	Asia	
Djibouti	**Djibouti**	Africa	
Dodoma	**Tanzania**	Africa	Dar es Salaam, the former capital and largest city, still hosts some government ministries, the judiciary, and diplomatic missions.
Doha	**Qatar**	Asia	
Douglas	Isle of Man	Europe	British Crown Dependency.
Dublin	**Ireland**	Europe	
Dushanbe	**Tajikistan**	Asia	
Edinburgh of the Seven Seas	Tristan da Cunha		Part of the British Overseas Territory of Saint Helena, Ascension and Tristan da Cunha.
Flying Fish Cove	Christmas Island		External territory of Australia.
Fort-de-France	Martinique	North America	Overseas department, region and single territorial collectivity of France.
Freetown	**Sierra Leone**	Africa	
Funafuti	**Tuvalu**	Oceania	The village of Vaiaku, separate from but within Funafuti, is the de facto capital, containing all the major organs of control
Gaborone	**Botswana**	Africa	
George Town	Cayman Islands	North America	British Overseas Territory.
Georgetown	Ascension Island		Part of the British Overseas Territory of Saint Helena, Ascension and Tristan da Cunha.
Georgetown	**Guyana**	South America	
Gibraltar	Gibraltar	Europe	British Overseas Territory and city-state.
Gitega (de jure)	**Burundi**	Africa	Bujumbura was the capital from 1962 to 2018.
Bujumbura (de facto)	**Burundi**	Africa	Bujumbura was the capital from 1962 to 2018.
Guatemala City	**Guatemala**	North America	
Gustavia	Saint Barthélemy	North America	Overseas collectivity of France.
Hagåtña	Guam	Oceania	Territory of the United States.
Hamilton	Bermuda	North America	British Overseas Territory.
Hanoi	**Vietnam**	Asia	See also: List of historical capitals of Vietnam.
Harare	**Zimbabwe**	Africa	
Hargeisa	Somaliland	Africa	De facto independent state, deemed by the UN to be de jure part of Somalia.
Havana	**Cuba**	North America	
Helsinki	**Finland**	Europe	
Honiara	**Solomon Islands**	Oceania	Honiara is a settlement on the island of Guadalcanal.
Islamabad	**Pakistan**	Asia	Karachi served as the first capital of Pakistan from 1948. A planned capital, Islamabad, was then designated, and in 1958, as an interim measure, the capital was shifted to Rawalpindi, near to the future capital. Islamabad became capital in 1967 when its construction was completed.
Jakarta (de facto)	**Indonesia**	Asia	The capital will be moved to Nusantara on Borneo. See also: Capital of Indonesia.
Nusantara	**Indonesia**	Asia	
Jamestown	Saint Helena		Part of the British Overseas Territory of Saint Helena, Ascension and Tristan da Cunha.
Jerusalem	**Israel**	Asia	The Jerusalem Law states that "Jerusalem, complete and united, is the capital of Israel" and the city serves as the seat of the Israeli government and its institutions. United Nations Security Council Resolution 478 declared the Jerusalem Law "null and void" and called on member states to withdraw their diplomatic missions from Jerusalem. Nearly all countries currently have their embassies in and around Tel Aviv. Defying the UN, the United States recognized Jerusalem as the capital and moved its embassy there in May 2018. Many countries officially adhere to the proposal that Jerusalem should have international status, as called for in the 1947 Partition Plan.
Jerusalem	**Palestine**	Asia	
Ramallah (de facto)	**Palestine**	Asia	
Juba	**South Sudan**	Africa	
Kabul	**Afghanistan**	Asia	
Kampala	**Uganda**	Africa	
Kathmandu	**Nepal**	Asia	
Khartoum	**Sudan**	Africa	
Kigali	**Rwanda**	Africa	
King Edward Point	South Georgia and the South Sandwich Islands		British Overseas Territory.
Kingston	**Jamaica**	North America	
Kingston	Norfolk Island	Oceania	External territory of Australia.
Kingstown	**Saint Vincent and the Grenadines**	North America	
Kinshasa	**Democratic Republic of the Congo**	Africa	
Kralendijk	Bonaire	North America	Public body of the Netherlands.
Kuala Lumpur (de jure, legislative and royal)	**Malaysia**	Asia	
Putrajaya (administrative and judicial)	**Malaysia**	Asia	
Kuwait City	**Kuwait**	Asia	
Kyiv	**Ukraine**	Europe	
La Paz (administrative)	**Bolivia**	South America	La Paz is the highest administrative capital (3,650 m) in the world, higher than Quito.
Sucre (constitutional)	**Bolivia**	South America	
Laayoune (declared)	Western Sahara	Africa	De facto independent state contested by both the Sahrawi Arab Democratic Republic (SADR), and Morocco. Laayoune is within Moroccan-controlled territory while Tifariti is within Sahrawi-controlled territory and serves as the temporary capital (previously Bir Lehlou). Some government and military buildings reside in exile in Tindouf, Algeria. See also: Politics of the Sahrawi Arab Democratic Republic.
Tifariti (de facto)	Western Sahara	Africa	De facto independent state contested by both the Sahrawi Arab Democratic Republic (SADR), and Morocco. Laayoune is within Moroccan-controlled territory while Tifariti is within Sahrawi-controlled territory and serves as the temporary capital (previously Bir Lehlou). Some government and military buildings reside in exile in Tindouf, Algeria. See also: Politics of the Sahrawi Arab Democratic Republic.
Libreville	**Gabon**	Africa	
Lilongwe	**Malawi**	Africa	
Lima	**Peru**	South America	Cusco is declared the "historical capital" (Spanish: capital histórica), by Article 49 of the Peruvian Constitution, a merely symbolic statement. Arequipa is deemed the "legal capital" as it is the seat of the Constitutional Court.
Lisbon	**Portugal**	Europe	
Ljubljana	**Slovenia**	Europe	
Lobamba (royal and legislative)	**Eswatini**	Africa	
Mbabane (administrative)	**Eswatini**	Africa	
Lomé	**Togo**	Africa	
London	**United Kingdom**	Europe	Prior to the Acts of Union in 1707, London was the capital of England only; Edinburgh was the capital of the Kingdom of Scotland. The United Kingdom includes the subdivisions of England (capital London), Scotland (capital Edinburgh), Wales (capital Cardiff), Northern Ireland (capital Belfast).
London (administration)	British Indian Ocean Territory	Asia	British Overseas Territory. Officially, the British Indian Ocean Territory is administered from London, though some consider the capital to be Diego Garcia.
Diego Garcia (de facto)	British Indian Ocean Territory	Asia	British Overseas Territory. Officially, the British Indian Ocean Territory is administered from London, though some consider the capital to be Diego Garcia.
Longyearbyen	Svalbard and Jan Mayen	Europe	Unincorporated area of the Kingdom of Norway.
Luanda	**Angola**	Africa	
Lusaka	**Zambia**	Africa	
Luxembourg	**Luxembourg**	Europe	
Madrid	**Spain**	Europe	
Majuro	**Marshall Islands**	Oceania	Self-governing in free association with the United States. The seat of government is at Delap-Uliga-Djarrit, a settlement on the atoll of Majuro.
Malé	**Maldives**	Asia	
Mamoudzou	Mayotte	Africa	Overseas department, region and single territorial collectivity of France.
Managua	**Nicaragua**	North America	
Manama	**Bahrain**	Asia	
Manila	**Philippines**	Asia	
Maputo	**Mozambique**	Africa	
Mariehamn	Åland Islands	Europe	Autonomous region of Finland.
Marigot	Saint Martin	North America	Overseas collectivity of France.
Maseru	**Lesotho**	Africa	
Mata Utu	Wallis and Futuna	Oceania	Overseas collectivity of France.
Mexico City	**Mexico**	North America	
Minsk	**Belarus**	Europe	
Mogadishu	**Somalia**	Africa	
Monaco	**Monaco**	Europe	City-state. Monaco does not have a capital designated in its constitution; however, the Commune of Monaco, the country's only commune, is coterminous with the nation, making it the de facto capital.
Monrovia	**Liberia**	Africa	
Montevideo	**Uruguay**	South America	
Moroni	**Comoros**	Africa	
Moscow	**Russia**	Europe	Saint Petersburg is residence of Constitutional Court of Russia
Muscat	**Oman**	Asia	
Nairobi	**Kenya**	Africa	
Nassau	**Bahamas, The**	North America	
Naypyidaw	**Myanmar**	Asia	Yangon was the capital until 2006. See also: List of capitals of Myanmar.
N'Djamena	**Chad**	Africa	
New Delhi	**India**	Asia	Calcutta was the capital of India until 1911 during the British Raj.
Ngerulmud	**Palau**	Oceania	Self-governing in free association with the United States. Koror City was the capital until 2006.
Niamey	**Niger**	Africa	
Nicosia	**Cyprus**	Asia	Nicosia is a divided capital, split between Cyprus, which claims the whole city, and the internationally unrecognized breakaway state of Northern Cyprus.
Nicosia	Northern Cyprus	Asia	Nicosia is a divided capital, split between Cyprus, which claims the whole city, and the internationally unrecognized breakaway state of Northern Cyprus.
Nouakchott	**Mauritania**	Africa	
Nouméa	New Caledonia	Oceania	Overseas territory of France.
Nukuʻalofa	**Tonga**	Oceania	
Nuuk	Greenland	North America	Self-governing country within the Kingdom of Denmark.
Oranjestad	Aruba	South America	Self-governing country within the Kingdom of the Netherlands.
Oranjestad	Sint Eustatius	North America	Public body of the Netherlands.
Oslo	**Norway**	Europe	See also: List of historical capitals of Norway.
Ottawa	**Canada**	North America	
Ouagadougou	**Burkina Faso**	Africa	
Pago Pago	American Samoa	Oceania	Territory of the United States.
Palikir	**Micronesia**	Oceania	Self-governing in free association with the United States. Kolonia is the former capital and Australia, China, Japan and the United States retain embassies there.
Panama City	**Panama**	North America	
Papeete	French Polynesia	Oceania	Overseas collectivity of France.
Paramaribo	**Suriname**	South America	
Paris	**France**	Europe	See also: List of Capitals of France.
Philipsburg	Sint Maarten	North America	Self-governing country within the Kingdom of the Netherlands.
Phnom Penh	**Cambodia**	Asia	
Podgorica	**Montenegro**	Europe	Cetinje has been designated the "Old Royal Capital" and is the present seat of the President.
Port Louis	**Mauritius**	Africa	
Port Moresby	**Papua New Guinea**	Oceania	
Port of Spain	**Trinidad and Tobago**	North America	
Port Vila	**Vanuatu**	Oceania	
Port-au-Prince	**Haiti**	North America	
Prague	**Czech Republic**	Europe	The Supreme Court of the Czech Republic is located in Brno.
Praia	**Cape Verde**	Africa	
Pristina	Kosovo	Europe	De facto independent state claimed entirely by Serbia as part of its Autonomous Province of Kosovo and Metohija.
Pyongyang	**North Korea**	Asia	
Quito	**Ecuador**	South America	Highest official capital (2,850 m).
Rabat	**Morocco**	Africa	
Reykjavík	**Iceland**	Europe	
Riga	**Latvia**	Europe	
Riyadh	**Saudi Arabia**	Asia	
Road Town	British Virgin Islands	North America	British Overseas Territory.
Rome	**Italy**	Europe	
Roseau	**Dominica**	North America	
Rothera	British Antarctic Territory	Antarctica	British Overseas Territory
Saipan	Northern Mariana Islands	Oceania	Territory of the United States. The seat of government is at Capitol Hill, a settlement on the island of Saipan.
Saint-Denis	Réunion	Africa	Overseas department and region of France.
San José	**Costa Rica**	North America	
San Juan	Puerto Rico	North America	Territory of the United States.
San Marino	**San Marino**	Europe	
San Salvador	**El Salvador**	North America	
Santiago	**Chile**	South America	The National Congress of Chile is located in Valparaíso.
Santo Domingo	**Dominican Republic**	North America	
São Tomé	**São Tomé and Príncipe**	Africa	
Sarajevo	**Bosnia and Herzegovina**	Europe	
Seoul	**South Korea**	Asia	On 2 July 2012, some government functions moved to Sejong City, which became the de facto administrative capital.
Singapore	**Singapore**	Asia	City-state.
Skopje	**North Macedonia**	Europe	
Sofia	**Bulgaria**	Europe	
South Tarawa	**Kiribati**	Oceania	South Tarawa is a settlement on the atoll of Tarawa.
St. George's	**Grenada**	North America	
St. Helier	Jersey	Europe	British Crown Dependency.
St. John's	**Antigua and Barbuda**	North America	
St. Peter Port	Guernsey	Europe	British Crown Dependency.
St. Pierre	Saint Pierre and Miquelon	North America	Overseas collectivity of France.
Stanley	Falkland Islands	South America	British Overseas Territory.
Stockholm	**Sweden**	Europe	
Sukhumi	Abkhazia	Asia/Europe	De facto independent state with partial recognition claimed in whole by Georgia as the Autonomous Republic of Abkhazia.
Suva	**Fiji**	Oceania	
Taipei	Taiwan	Asia	De facto independent state, officially called the Republic of China, in competition with the People's Republic of China for recognition as the sole Chinese government since 1949. Taiwan controls the island of Taiwan and the associated islands Quemoy, Matsu, the Pratas, and part of the Spratly Islands. (Note: Sovereignty over the Spratly Islands is disputed by the PRC, the ROC, Vietnam, the Philippines (part), Malaysia (part), and Brunei (part).) Its territory is claimed in whole by the People's Republic of China. (Note: In 1949, the Republic of China government led by the Kuomintang (KMT) lost the Chinese Civil War to the Chinese Communist Party (CCP) and set up a provisional capital in Taipei. The CPC established the People's Republic. As such, the political status of the ROC and the legal status of Taiwan (alongside the territories under ROC jurisdiction) are in dispute. In 1971, the United Nations gave the China seat to the PRC instead of the ROC: most states recognize the PRC to be the sole legitimate representative of all China, and the UN classifies Taiwan as "Taiwan, Province of China". The ROC has de facto relations with most sovereign states. A significant political movement within Taiwan advocates Taiwan independence.) The Republic of China participates in a number of international organizations under a variety of pseudonyms, most commonly Chinese Taipei.
Tallinn	**Estonia**	Europe	
Tashkent	**Uzbekistan**	Asia	
Tbilisi	**Georgia**	Asia/Europe	From 2012 to 2018, Kutaisi served as Georgia's legislative capital. Additionally, Mtskheta is sometimes called an "ancient capital" of Georgia.
Tegucigalpa	**Honduras**	North America	Comayagüela is declared in the Honduran Constitution as co-official capital with Tegucigalpa. The cities have since merged into a single urban area.
Comayagüela	**Honduras**	North America	Comayagüela is declared in the Honduran Constitution as co-official capital with Tegucigalpa. The cities have since merged into a single urban area.
Tehran	**Iran**	Asia	
Thimphu	**Bhutan**	Asia	
The Bottom	Saba	North America	Public body of the Netherlands.
Tirana	**Albania**	Europe	
Tiraspol	Transnistria	Europe	De facto independent state, recognized by only non UN members. Claimed in whole by Moldova as the autonomous territorial unit of Administrative-Territorial Units of the Left Bank of the Dniester
Tokyo	**Japan**	Asia	See also: Capital of Japan.
Tórshavn	Faroe Islands	Europe	Self-governing country within the Kingdom of Denmark.
Tripoli	**Libya**	Africa	
Tskhinvali	South Ossetia	Asia/Europe	De facto independent state with limited recognition. Claimed in whole by Georgia as the Provisional Administration of South Ossetia.
Tunis	**Tunisia**	Africa	
Ulaanbaatar	**Mongolia**	Asia	
Vaduz	**Liechtenstein**	Europe	
Valletta	**Malta**	Europe	
The Valley	Anguilla	North America	British Overseas Territory.
Vatican City	**Vatican City**	Europe	City-state.
Victoria	**Seychelles**	Africa	
Vienna	**Austria**	Europe	
Vientiane	**Laos**	Asia	
Vilnius	**Lithuania**	Europe	
Warsaw	**Poland**	Europe	Former capitals listed in Template:Historical capitals of Poland.
Washington, D.C.	**United States**	North America	The capital of the United States has moved several times. See also: National capitals of the United States.
Wellington	**New Zealand**	Oceania	Since 1865. Wellington is New Zealand's third capital. See also: Capital of New Zealand.
West Island	Cocos (Keeling) Islands		External territory of Australia.
Willemstad	Curaçao		Self-governing country within the Kingdom of the Netherlands.
Windhoek	**Namibia**	Africa	
Yaoundé	**Cameroon**	Africa	
Yaren (de facto)	**Nauru**	Oceania	Nauru has no official capital, nor cities; the government offices are in Yaren district.
Yerevan	**Armenia**	Asia/Europe	
Zagreb	**Croatia**	Europe	

== See also ==
- List of countries with multiple capitals
- List of purpose-built national capitals
