= European capital =

European capital may refer to:

- the capitals of the European countries (see List of national capitals)
- the Capital of the European Union (usually in reference to Brussels, often alongside Strasbourg and sometimes with Luxembourg City)
- Strasbourg, as headquarters of the Council of Europe
- the European Capital of Culture
- A political party in Ukraine
