= List of former national capitals =

Throughout the world there are many cities that were once national capitals but no longer have that status because the country ceased to exist, the capital was moved, or the capital city was renamed. This is a list of such cities, sorted by country and then by date. Where a city name has changed, the name of the city when it was a capital is listed first, followed by its modern name in brackets.

== Africa ==
=== Northern Africa ===
Old capital city	Country	Today a part of	From	Until	Change, reason
Fustat	(Abbasid Caliphate) Abbasid Egypt; Ikhshidid dynasty	Egypt	905	969	Moved to Cairo
Marrakesh	Almoravid dynasty	Morocco	1070	1147	Moved to Fez
Tinmel	Almohad Caliphate	Morocco	1121	1147	Moved to Marrakesh and Seville
Marrakesh	Almohad Caliphate	Morocco	1147	1269	Moved to Fez
Altava	Kingdom of Altava	Algeria	578	708	
Memphis	Ancient Egypt	Egypt	3150 BC	2160 BC	Moved to Henen-Nesut. The Ancient Greeks called the city Memphis, its native name was Inbu-Hedj.
Thebes	Ancient Egypt	Egypt	2134 BC	1292 BC	Moved to Pi-Ramesses. The Ancient Greeks called the city Thebes, its native name was Waset.
Béjaïa	Hafsid Emirate of Béjaïa	Algeria	1285	1510	
Kalâa of Ait Abbas	Kingdom of Beni Abbas	Algeria	1510	1872	
Benghazi	Emirate of Cyrenaica	Libya	1949	1951	
Fez	Zawiya Dila'iya, (Morocco) Sharifian Sultanate	Morocco	1659	1672	Moved to Meknes
Qal'at Bani Hammad	Hammadid dynasty	Algeria	c. 1007	1090	Moved to Béjaïa
Béjaïa	Hammadid dynasty	Algeria	c. 1090	1152	
Walili	Idrisid dynasty	Morocco	789	808	Moved to Fez
Fez	Idrisid dynasty	Morocco	808	927	Moved to Hajar an-Nasar, to try and restore power base
Kuku	Kingdom of Kuku	Algeria	c. 1515	1730	
Al Bayda	Kingdom of Libya	Libya	1963	1969	Formation of the Libyan Arab Republic under the rule of Muammar Gaddafi
Fez	Marinid dynasty	Morocco	1244	1465	Moved to Marrakesh
Mascara	Emirate of Mascara	Algeria	1832	1835	Moved to Tagdemt
Tagdemt	Emirate of Mascara	Algeria	1835	1847	
Altava	Kingdom of the Moors and Romans	Algeria	c. 477	578	
Meknes	Morocco (under Ismail Ibn Sharif)	Morocco	1672	1727	Moved to Fez
Alexandria	Ptolemaic Kingdom	Egypt	305 BC	30 BC	Ptolomaic Egypt was succeeded by the Roman Empire.
Fustat	Rashidun Egypt; Umayyad Egypt	Egypt	641	750	Moved to Al-Askar
Tahert (Tiaret)	Rustamid Imamate	Algeria	777	909	
Tidsi	Saadi Sultanate	Morocco	1510	1513	Moved to Afughal
Afughal	Saadi Sultanate	Morocco	1513	1525	Moved to Marrakesh
Marrakesh	Saadi Sultanate	Morocco	1525	1659	
Fez	Saadi Sultanate	Morocco	1603	1627	Fez was a rival capital to Marrakesh during this period.
Fez	(Morocco) Sharifian Sultanate	Morocco	1727	1912	Moved to Rabat
Tlemcen	Emirate of Tlemcen	Algeria	c. 757	790	
Tlemcen	Zayyanid Kingdom of Tlemcen	Algeria	1235	1556	
ʽAziziya	Tripolitanian Republic	Libya	1918	1922	
Tuggurt	Sultanate of Tuggurt	Algeria	1414	1871	The sultanate was absorbed into French Algeria.
Al-Qata'i	Tulunid Emirate	Egypt	868	905	Moved to Fustat
Al-Askar	Tulunid Emirate	Egypt	750	868	Abbasid dynasty re-asserted control; provincial capital moved to Al-Qata'i
Hippo Regius (Annaba)	Kingdom of the Vandals and Alans	Algeria	435	439	Capital moved to Carthage.
Carthage	Kingdom of the Vandals and Alans	Tunisia	439	534	Vandal Kingdom was absorbed by Byzantine Empire.
Fez	Wattasid dynasty	Morocco	1472	1554	Wattasid dynasty was succeeded by Saadi Sultanate
Achir	Zirid dynasty	Algeria	936	1014	
al-Mansuriyya	Zirid dynasty	Tunisia	972	1057	
Mahdia	Zirid dynasty	Tunisia	1057	1148	

=== Sub-Saharan Africa ===
==== Central Africa ====
Old capital city	Country	Today a part of	From	Until	Change, reason
Jamba	Angola, Democratic People's Republic of	Angola	1975	1976	
Jamba	Angola, Democratic People's Republic of	Angola	1979	2002	
Halã-Vala, Bimbe-Katapi (Bailundo)	Bailundo	Angola	c. 1700	1903	
Cabinda	Cabinda, Republic of	Angola	1975	1976	
Boma	Congo Free State	Congo, Democratic Republic of the	1886	1908	
Boma	Congo, Belgian	Congo, Democratic Republic of the	1908	1926	moved to Léopoldville (Kinshasa)
Stanleyville (Kisangani)	Congo, People's Republic of the	Congo, Democratic Republic of the	1964	1965	
Quinguele	Kakongo	Angola	?	1885	
Njimi	Kanem	Chad	fl. 11th century	c. 1396	lost to Bulala invaders (eventually moved to Ngazargamu)
Élisabethville (Lubumbashi)	Katanga, State of	Congo, Democratic Republic of the	1960	1963	
São Salvador (M'banza-Kongo)	Kongo, Kingdom of	Angola	1483	1915	
Lumbala N'guimbo	Mbunda Kingdom	Angola	c. 1500	1917	
Cabaça	Ndongo, Kingdom of	Angola	?	1657	
Bakwanga (Mbuji-Mayi)	South Kasai	Congo, Democratic Republic of the	1960	1962	
Kasongo	Utetera, Sultanate of	Congo, Democratic Republic of the	1860	1887	
Cuíto	Viye	Angola	1750	1890	
Ganda-a-Caué (Caála)	Wambu	Angola	c. 1650	1902	
Huambo-Cabral Moncada (Lépi)	Wambu	Angola	1902	1903	
Malabo	Equatorial Guinea	Equatorial Guinea	1968	2026	

==== Eastern Africa ====
Old capital city	Country	Today a part of	From	Until	Change, reason
Zanzibar City	Zanzibar, Sultanate of	Tanzania	1856	1964	Sultanate ceased to exist; Zanzibar Revolution
Zanzibar City	Zanzibar, People's Republic of	Tanzania	1964	1964	Zanzibar merged with Tanganyika in 1964. The city remains the capital of semi-autonomous region of Zanzibar.
Dar es Salaam	Tanganyika	Tanzania	1961	1964	country merged with Zanzibar to form Tanzania
Dar es Salaam	Tanzania	Tanzania	1964	1996	capital moved to Dodoma
Axum	Aksum, Kingdom of	Ethiopia	50	?	city abandoned
Debre Berhan	Ethiopian Empire	Ethiopia	1456	mid-1470s	Emperor returned to custom of a moving capital
Gondar	Ethiopian Empire	Ethiopia	1635	late 19th century	moved to Addis Ababa
Bujumbura	Burundi	Burundi	1962	2018	moved to Gitega
Entebbe	Uganda, Protectorate of	Uganda	1894	1962	moved to Kampala

==== Southern Africa ====
Old capital city	Country	Today a part of	From	Until	Change, reason
Otjimbingwe	German South-West Africa	Namibia	1886	1892	moved to Windhoek
Zomba	British Central Africa Protectorate	Malawi	1893	1907	Protectorate renamed as Nyasaland Protectorate.
Zomba	Nyasaland Protectorate	Malawi	1907	1953	Merged with Southern Rhodesia and Northern Rhodesia to form the Federation of Rhodesia and Nyasaland.
Zomba	Malawi	Malawi	1964	1975	Capital moved to Lilongwe.
Fort Jameson (Chipata)	North-Eastern Rhodesia	Zambia	1899	1911	Merged with North-Western Rhodesia to form Northern Rhodesia.
Kalomo	North-Western Rhodesia	Zambia	1899	1907	Moved to Livingstone.
Livingstone	North-Western Rhodesia	Zambia	1907	1911	Merged with North-Western Rhodesia to form Northern Rhodesia.
Livingstone	Northern Rhodesia	Zambia	1911	1935	Moved to Lusaka.
Island of Mozambique	Portuguese Mozambique	Mozambique	1498	1898	Moved to Maputo.

==== Western Africa ====
Old capital city	Country	Today a part of	From	Until	Change, reason
Ribeira Grande (Cidade Velha)	Portuguese Cape Verde	Cape Verde	1462	1770	moved to Praia
Grand-Bassam	Ivory Coast (French colony)	Ivory Coast	1893	1900	moved to Bingerville
Bingerville	Ivory Coast (French colony)	Ivory Coast	1900	1933	moved to Abidjan
Abidjan	Ivory Coast (French colony)	Ivory Coast	1933	1983	moved to Yamoussoukro
Cape Coast	Gold Coast	Ghana	1664	1877	moved to Accra
Bolama	Portuguese Guinea	Guinea-Bissau	1879	1941	moved to Bissau
Boe	Guinea-Bissau	Guinea-Bissau	1973	1974	moved back to Bissau
Ngazargamu	Kanem-Bornu Empire	Nigeria	c. 1472	1808	lost to Fulani invaders (eventually moved to Kukawa)
Kukawa	Kanem-Bornu Empire	Nigeria	1814	1893	Kingdom ceased to exist
Lagos	Colonial Nigeria	Nigeria	1914	1960	
Lagos	Nigeria, Federation of	Nigeria	1960	1991	moved to Abuja
Igbo-Ukwu	Nri, Kingdom of	Nigeria	1043	1911	Kingdom was absorbed by Colonial Nigeria
Aného	Togoland	Togo	1880s	1897	moved to Lomé

== Asia ==
=== Central Asia ===
Old capital city	Country	Today a part of	From	Until	Change, reason
Semey	Alash Orda	Kazakhstan	1917	1920	Entity named Kyrgyz ASSR established, capital moved to Orenburg
Bukhara	Bukhara, Khanate of	Uzbekistan	1533	1551	moved to Samarqand
Bukhara	Bukhara, Khanate of	Uzbekistan	1556	1756	
Bukhara	Bukhara, Emirate of	Uzbekistan	1785	1920	
Bukhara	Bukharan SRR	Uzbekistan	1920	1924	
Kandahar	Durrani Empire	Afghanistan	1748	1772	moved to Kabul
Ghazni	Ghaznavid Empire	Afghanistan	977	1163	moved to Lahore
Ghazni	Ghurid dynasty	Afghanistan	1170s	1215	
Bactra (Balkh)	Greco-Bactrian Kingdom	Afghanistan	3rd century BC	2rd century BC	
Herat	Herat, Emirate of	Afghanistan	1793	1863	Annexation of the country to the Emirate of Afghanistan
Kandahar	Kandahar, Principality of	Afghanistan	1818	1855	Annexation of the country to the Emirate of Kabul
Alma-Ata (Almaty)	Kazakh SSR	Kazakhstan	1936	1991	
Alma-Ata (Almaty)	Kazakhstan	Kazakhstan	1991	1993	city renamed Almaty
Almaty	Kazakhstan	Kazakhstan	1993	1998	moved to Astana
Khiva	Khiva, Khanate of	Uzbekistan	1511	1920	
Khiva	Khorezm SRR	Uzbekistan	1920	1924	
Kokand (Fergana)	Kokand, Khanate of	Uzbekistan	1709	1876	Annexation of the country to the Russian Empire
Asadabad	Kunar, Islamic Emirate of	Afghanistan	1991	1991	Fall of the state.
Bagram	Kushan Empire	Afghanistan	1st century AD	1st century AD	
Maymana	Maimana Khanate	Afghanistan	1747	1892	Annexation of the country to the Emirate of Kabul, preceded by the sacking of the city
Zaranj	Mihrabanid dynasty	Afghanistan	1236	1537	
Omsk	Russia (White Movement)	Russia	1918	1920	White Movement defeated by Reds
Samarkand	Timurid Empire	Uzbekistan	1370	1405	Capital moved to Herat.
Zaranj	Saffarid dynasty	Afghanistan	861	1002	
Herat	Timurid Empire	Afghanistan	1405	1507	Invaded by Muhammad Shaybani.
Gurganj (Konye-Urgench)	Khwarazmian Empire	Turkmenistan	1077	1212	moved to Samarqand
Iasy (Turkistan)	Uzbek Khanate	Kazakhstan	1469	1471	
Samarkand	Uzbek SSR	Uzbekistan	1925	1930	moved to Tashkent
Alexandria in the Caucasus (Bagram)	Yavana Kingdom	Afghanistan	180 BC	AD 10	

=== Eastern Asia ===
Old capital city	Country	Today a part of	From	Until	Change, reason
Anyang	Shang dynasty	China	c. 1600 BC	c. 1046 BC	moved to Chang'an - end of Shang dynasty
Chang'an	Zhou dynasty	China	c. 1046 BC	722 BC	moved to Luoyang
Luoyang	Zhou dynasty	China	771 BC	221 BC	moved to Xianyang - fall of Zhou dynasty
Xianyang	Qin dynasty	China	221 BC	206 BC	moved back to Chang'an - fall of Qin dynasty
Chang'an	Han dynasty	China	206 BC	25	moved back to Luoyang
Luoyang	Han dynasty	China	25	220	Fall of the Han dynasty marking the beginning of the Six Dynasties period
Chang'an	Sui dynasty and Tang dynasty	China	581	907	fall of the Tang dynasty marking the beginning of the Five Dynasties and Ten Kingdoms period
Kaifeng	Song dynasty	China	960	1127	moved to Hangzhou
Hangzhou	Song dynasty	China	1127	1279	Kublai Khan integrated China into the Mongol Empire
Nanjing	Ming dynasty	China	1368	1421	moved to Beijing
Nanjing	China, Republic of	China	1928	1937	moved to Chongqing because of Japanese occupation
Ruijin	China, Soviet Republic of	China	1931	1934	moved to Shaanxi due to the Long March
Chongqing	China, Republic of	China	1937	1945	moved back to Nanjing
Nanjing	China, Republic of	China	1945	1949 (de facto)	moved to Taipei after the loss of the mainland which caused the nationalist government fled to Taiwan and made Taipei the temporary capital of the Republic of China. Beijing was proclaimed the capital of the People's Republic of China.
Hakodate	Republic of Ezo	Japan	1868	1869	Annexed by Japan
Middag	Middag, Kingdom of	Taiwan	?	1732?	Middag annexed by Qing dynasty
Tainan	Formosa, Republic of	Taiwan	1895	1895	Annexed by Japan
Tainan	Tungning, Kingdom of	Taiwan	1662	1683	Kingdom of Tungning conquered by Qing dynasty. Tainan remained the seat of government until 1885.
Asuka	Japan	Japan	?	694	moved to Fujiwara-kyō (Kashihara)
Fujiwara-kyō (Kashihara)	Japan	Japan	694	710	moved to Heijō-kyō (Nara)
Heijō-kyō (Nara)	Japan	Japan	710	784	moved to Nagaoka-kyō (Nagaoka)
Nagaoka-kyō (Nagaoka)	Japan	Japan	784	794	moved to Heian-kyō (Kyoto)
Heian-kyō (Kyoto)	Japan	Japan	794	1868	moved to Tokyo (see also: Capital of Japan)
Shuri	Ryūkyū Kingdom	Japan	1429	1879	Annexed by Japan
Wanggeom (Pyongyang)	Gojoseon	North Korea	194 BC	108 BC	fall of Gojoseon
Holbon (Mt. Wunü)	Goguryeo	China	37 BC	3	moved to Gungnae
Gungnae (Ji'an)	Goguryeo	China	3	427	moved to Pyongyang
Pyongyang	Goguryeo	North Korea	427	668	fall of Goguryeo
Seorabeol (Gyeongju)	Silla	South Korea	57 BC	935	fall of Silla
Wirye (Southern Seoul)	Baekje	South Korea	18 BC	476	moved to Ungjin
Ungjin (Gongju)	Baekje	South Korea	476	538	moved to Sabi
Sabi (Buyeo)	Baekje	South Korea	538	660	fall of Baekje
Sanggyeong (Ning'an)	Balhae	China	756	926	fall of Balhae
Gaegyeong (Kaesong)	Goryeo	North Korea	919	1392	moved to Hanyang (Seoul) - fall of Goryeo dynasty
Seoul	North Korea	South Korea	1948	1972	de jure capital changed to Pyongyang in a new Constitution of North Korea

=== Northern Asia ===
Old capital city	Country	Today a part of	From	Until	Change, reason
Qashliq	Sibir, Khanate of	Russia	15th century	1598	Country absorbed by Tsardom of Russia.

=== Southeast Asia ===
Old capital city	Country	Today a part of	From	Until	Change, reason
Yaśodharapura (Angkor)	Khmer Empire	Cambodia	802	1431	Sacked by Ayutthaya
Srey Sorchhor	Cambodia	Cambodia	1431	1434	Move to Chaktomuk (in 1434)
Chaktomuk	Cambodia	Cambodia	1434	1525	Move to Longvek (in 1525)
Longvek	Cambodia	Cambodia	1525	1593	Move to Oudong (in 1618)
Oudong	Cambodia	Cambodia	1620	1863	Move to Phnom Penh (in 1863)
Phnom Penh	Colonial Cambodia	Cambodia	1863	1887	annexed by France; moved to Saigon
Batavia (Jakarta)	Dutch East Indies	Indonesia	1800	1945	Independence of Indonesia, renamed to Jakarta
Jakarta	Indonesia	Indonesia	1945	1946	NICA occupation, moved to Yogyakarta
Yogyakarta	Indonesia	Indonesia	1946	1948	Dutch military occupation, moved to Bukittinggi
Bukittinggi	Indonesia	Indonesia	1948	1949	moved to Yogyakarta
Yogyakarta	Indonesia	Indonesia	1949	1950	United States of Indonesia dissolved, moved to Jakarta
Jakarta	Indonesia	Indonesia	1950	TBA	moved to Nusantara
Luang Prabang	Lan Prabang	Laos	1707	?	Luang Prabang was one of three successors states to Lan Xang.
Vientiane	Lan Xang	Laos	1354	?	moved to Luang Prabang
Luang Prabang	Laos, Kingdom of	Laos	1949	1975	abdication of King Savang Vatthana; the second capital
Vientiane	Laos, Kingdom of	Laos	1949	1975	abdication of King Savang Vatthana
Vientiane	Vientiane Lao	Laos	c. 1707 (?)	1828	incorporated to Siam, then absorbed into French Indochina (in 1893)
Champasak	Champasak Kingdom	Laos	1713	1946	Became part of Kingdom of Laos.
Pagan (Bagan)	Pagan Kingdom	Myanmar	849	1297	moved to Myinsaing, Mekkhaya and Pinle
Martaban (Mottama)	Hanthawaddy kingdom	Myanmar	1287	1363	moved to Donwun
Donwun	Hanthawaddy kingdom	Myanmar	1363	1369	moved to Pegu
Pegu (Bago)	Hanthawaddy kingdom	Myanmar	1369	1538	Captured by Toungoo forces
Pegu (Bago)	Hanthawaddy kingdom	Myanmar	1550	1552	Recaptured by Toungoo
Myinsaing, Mekkhaya and Pinle	Myinsaing Kingdom	Myanmar	1297	1313	moved to Pinya
Pinya	Pinya Kingdom	Myanmar	1313	1365	moved to Ava
Sagaing	Sagaing Kingdom	Myanmar	1315	1365	moved to Ava
Ava (Inwa)	Ava Kingdom	Myanmar	1365	1555	moved to Pegu
Launggyet	Arakan, Kingdom of	Myanmar	1429	1430	moved to Mrauk-U
Mrauk-U	Arakan, Kingdom of	Myanmar	1430	1785	Captured by Konbaung forces
Toungoo (Taungoo)	Toungoo dynasty	Myanmar	1510	1539	moved to Pegu
Pegu	Toungoo dynasty	Myanmar	1539	1599	moved to Ava
Ava	Toungoo dynasty	Myanmar	1599	1613	moved to Pegu
Pegu	Toungoo dynasty	Myanmar	1613	1635	moved to Ava
Ava	Toungoo dynasty	Myanmar	1635	1752	moved to Shwebo
Shwebo	Konbaung dynasty	Myanmar	1752	1760	moved to Sagaing
Sagaing	Konbaung dynasty	Myanmar	1760	1765	moved to Ava
Ava	Konbaung dynasty	Myanmar	1765	1783	moved to Amarapura
Amarapura	Konbaung dynasty	Myanmar	1783	1821	moved to Ava
Ava	Konbaung dynasty	Myanmar	1821	1842	moved to Amarapura
Amarapura	Konbaung dynasty	Myanmar	1842	1859	moved to Mandalay
Mandalay	Konbaung dynasty	Myanmar	1859	1885	moved to Rangoon (Yangon)
Rangoon (Yangon)	Burma (Myanmar)	Myanmar	1885	1989	country renamed to Myanmar; city renamed to Yangon
Yangon	Myanmar	Myanmar	1989	2005	moved to Naypyidaw
Marawi	Maguindanao Sultanate	Philippines	c. 1205	1888	Annexed into the Spanish East Indies
Bacolod	Negros, Cantonal Republic of	Philippines	1898	1899	Unrecognised state absorbed by the Philippines under American control.
Malolos	Philippine Republic, First	Philippines	1898	1899	Headquarters of the Revolutionary movement (Note: Several other towns became capitals at a succeeding rate, namely San Isidro, Cabanatuan, Bamban, Tarlac, Bayambang and Palanan, to avoid capture from the Americans). Moved back to Manila after capture of Aguinaldo on 1901.
Manila	Philippine Republic, Second	Philippines	1943	1945	Liberation of the Philippines from the Japanese
Manila	Philippines, Commonwealth of the	Philippines	1934	1941	Japanese occupation. Moved back to Manila in 1945 after the liberation of the Philippines
Baguio	Philippines	Philippines	1946	1976	Summer Capital, moved back to Manila via Presidential Decree No. 940.
Quezon City	Philippines	Philippines	1948	1976	Moved back to Manila via Presidential Decree No. 940. Quezon City, with Manila, became parts of Metro Manila. Several government offices remained in Quezon City, including the Batasang Pambansa, and ultimately the House of Representatives. Manila is the current capital.
Cebu	Spanish East Indies	Philippines	1562	c. 1578	First Spanish settlement in the country. Moved to Manila (Formerly Maynilad) after capture.
Manila	Spanish East Indies	Philippines	c. 1578	1762	Captured by the British during the Seven Years' War, returned to Spain after the Treaty of Paris.
Bacolor	Spanish East Indies	Philippines	1762	1764	Capital of the exiled government Governor-general Simon de Anda during the Seven Years' War. Moved back to Manila
Manila	Spanish East Indies	Philippines	1764	1901	Ceded to the United States via Treaty of Paris
Jolo	Sulu Sultanate	Philippines	c. 1450	1899	Annexed by the United States
Chiang Mai	Lan Na	Thailand	1259	1775	Annexed by Burma
Chiang Mai	Rattanatingsa	Thailand	1802	1899	Annexed by Siam
Sukhothai	Sukhothai Kingdom	Thailand	1238	1347	
Phitsanulok	Sukhothai Kingdom	Thailand	1347	1583	moved to Ayutthaya after sacked by Ayutthaya
Ayutthaya	Ayutthaya Kingdom	Thailand	1351	1666	
Phitsanulok	Ayutthaya Kingdom	Thailand	1463	1488	
Lopburi	Ayutthaya Kingdom	Thailand	1666	1688	
Ayutthaya	Ayutthaya Kingdom	Thailand	1688	1767	moved to Thonburi after the Burmese destroyed the city
Thonburi	Thonburi Kingdom	Thailand	1767	1782	moved to Bangkok after King Taksin was declared mad
Phong Châu, Phú Thọ	Văn Lang (Hồng Bàng dynasty)	Vietnam	2879 BC	258 BC	annexed by Thục dynasty
Phong Châu, Phú Thọ	Vạn Xuân (Hậu Lý Nam Đế)	Vietnam	571	602	Third Chinese domination
Cổ Loa (Hanoi)	Âu Lạc (Thục dynasty)	Vietnam	257 BC	207 BC	First Chinese domination
Cổ Loa (Hanoi)	(Ngô dynasty)	Vietnam	938	967	the upheavals of Twelve warlords
Đại La (Hanoi)	An Nam (Phùng Hưng)	Vietnam	8th century	?	Annexed by Tang dynasty
Đại La (Hanoi)	An Nam (Khúc clan)	Vietnam	905	930	Dương Dinh Nghe was killed by his legion commander Kiều Công Tiễn and thus ending Khúc rule.
Đại La (Hanoi)	An Nam (Dương Đình Nghệ and Kiều Công Tiễn)	Vietnam	931	937	Ngô Quyền defeated Southern Han dynasty
Đông Đô (Hanoi)	Đại Việt (Later Lê dynasty and Mạc dynasty)	Vietnam	1428	1788	
Mê Linh (Hanoi)	Trưng Sisters	Vietnam	40	43	Second Chinese domination
Long Biên (Hanoi)	Vạn Xuân (Anterior Lý dynasty and Triệu Việt Vương)	Vietnam	544	571	moved to Phong Châu
Hoa Lư (Hoa Lư)	Đại Cồ Việt (Đinh dynasty)	Vietnam	968	980	
Hoa Lư (Hoa Lư)	Đại Cồ Việt (Early Lê dynasty)	Vietnam	980	1009	moved to Đại La, then renamed into Thăng Long
Tây Đô, Thanh Hóa	Đại Ngu (Hồ dynasty)	Vietnam	1400	1407	Fourth Chinese domination; it was the first capital of Hồ dynasty
Tây Đô, Thanh Hóa	Đại Việt-Nam Triều (Restored Lê dynasty)	Vietnam	1533	1592	moved to Thăng Long after defeating Mạc dynasty
Phú Xuân (Huế)	Đại Việt-Đàng Trong (Nguyễn lords)	Vietnam	1558	1777	Tây Sơn dynasty unified Đại Việt
Phú Xuân (Huế)	Đại Việt (Tây Sơn dynasty)	Vietnam	1788	1802	Defeated by Nguyễn Ánh (Nguyễn dynasty)
Phú Xuân (Huế)	Đại Nam (Nguyễn dynasty)	Vietnam	1802	1945	moved to Hanoi after the abdication of Emperor Bảo Đại
Phú Xuân (Huế)	Empire of Vietnam	Vietnam	1945	1945	August Revolution
Huế	An Nam (Nguyễn dynasty)	Vietnam	1874	1955	annexed by France, Geneva Conference (1954) led to the Partition of Vietnam
Saigon (Ho Chi Minh City)	French Indochina	Vietnam	1887	1901	moved to Hanoi
Saigon (Ho Chi Minh City)	Vietnam, State of	Vietnam	1949	1955	Geneva Conference (1954) led to the Partition of Vietnam; Saigon was renamed Ho Chi Minh City in 1976.
Saigon (Ho Chi Minh City)	Vietnam, South	Vietnam	1954	1975	Hanoi, country ceased to exist after unification of Vietnam
Thăng Long (Hanoi)	Đại Việt (Lý & Trần dynasties)	Vietnam	1010	1400	Trần dynasty renovated Thăng Long and renamed to Long Phượng
Thăng Long (Hanoi)	Đại Việt (Later Lê dynasty)	Vietnam	1428	1527	Southern and Northern Dynasties of Vietnam
Thăng Long (Hanoi)	Đại Việt-Bắc Triều (Mạc dynasty)	Vietnam	1533	1592	defeated by Trịnh lords; renamed again to Đông Đô
Thăng Long (Hanoi)	Đại Việt-Đàng Ngoài (Later Lê dynasty - Trịnh lords)	Vietnam	1593	1788	Thăng Long was destroyed by Qing dynasty and Tây Sơn dynasty unified Đại Việt, then moved to Phú Xuân; renamed to Bắc Thành; renamed to Hanoi in 1831.
Hanoi	French Indochina	Vietnam	1902	1953	Geneva Conference (1954) led to the Partition of Vietnam; in 1831, Emperor Minh Mạng renamed Thăng Long to Hanoi (Hà Nội)
Hanoi	Vietnam, North	Vietnam	1954	1976	Unification with South Vietnam to become the capital of unified Vietnam

=== Southern Asia ===
Old capital city	Country	Today a part of	From	Until	Change, reason
Madurai	Pandya Empire	India	c. 6th century	1335	Capital moved to Tenkasi
Thanjavur	Chola Empire	India	c. 9th century	1279	Chola Empire is disestablished
Dacca (legislative)	Pakistan	Bangladesh	1962	1971	Country's constituent assembly should meet in East Pakistan due to the region's high population.
Mujibnagar	Bangladesh, Provisional Government of	Bangladesh	1971	1972	A provisional government was established and the leaders of Bangladesh swore their oaths in this town known as Baiydanathtala or Bhoborpara. This was later renamed to Mujibnagar in honour of Sheikh Mujibur Rahman
Hazrat Pandua	Bengal Sultanate	India	1352	1450	First and longest capital of the Bengal Sultanate.
Sonargaon	Bengal Sultanate	Bangladesh	1390	1411	Capital moved to Gaur
Gaur/Lakhnauti	Bengal Sultanate	Bangladesh	1450	1565	Nasiruddin Mahmud Shah changed the capital from Pandua to nearby Gaur, probably due to change in river course.
Tanda	Bengal Sultanate	India	1565	1576	Bengal Sultanate was defeated by the Mughal Empire in 1576, but Tanda remained as Bengal's provincial capital until the 1590s.
Daulatabad	Tughlaq dynasty	India	1327	1329	Forcibly moved the entire population of Delhi to Daulatabad for a more centrally located capital. The decision was revoked and was moved back to Delhi within two years, due to lack of water.
Agra	Mughal Empire	India	1504	1653	moved to Aurangabad, was moved to Delhi during the reign of Shah Jahan and to Fatehpur Sikri during 1571–1585, during part of Akbar's reign.
Fatehpur Sikri	Mughal Empire	India	1571	1585	moved to Agra
Pune	Maratha Empire	India	1679	1818	British captured the city and controlled from Calcutta
Calcutta	British Raj	India	1772	1911	moved to Delhi
Delhi	British Raj	India	1911	1931	moved to New Delhi, inaugurated 1931
New Delhi	British Raj	India	1931	1947	became capital of independent Dominion of India in 1947, and later of Republic of India in 1950
Simla	British Raj	India	fl. 1850	1947	Summer capital
Mysore	Mysore, Kingdom of	India	1524	1947	Moved to New Delhi, Kingdom of Mysore dissolved- the capital of the state was moved temporarily to Bangalore 1831 to 1881 by Mark Cubbon.
Padmanabhapuram	Travancore, Kingdom of	India	1601	1795	Moved to Thiruvanathapuram by Maharajah Karthika Thirunal Rama Varma I.
Trivandrum	Travancore, Kingdom of	India	1795	1947	Moved to New Delhi as Travancore joined Dominion of India.
Hyderabad	Hyderabad State	India	1769	1948	Moved to New Delhi in September 1948, after the launch of a military operation by the Dominion of India known as Operation Polo. Hyderabad continues to remain the capital of the Indian states Telangana and, provisionally, Andhra Pradesh.
Gorkha	Gorkha Kingdom	Nepal	1559	1769	moved to Kathmandu after unification of Nepal
Kantipur	Kantipur, Kingdom of	Nepal	1560	1826	Became/Renamed as Kathmandu after Unification of Nepal.
Karachi	Pakistan	Pakistan	1947	1959	moved to Rawalpindi
Rawalpindi	Pakistan	Pakistan	1959	1967	moved to Islamabad
Lahore	Sikh Empire	Pakistan	1799	1849	Annexation of the Punjab by the East India Company.
Anuradhapura	Lanka	Sri Lanka	c. 382 BC	1018	Capital moved to possibly Polonnaruwa
Polonnaruwa	Kingdom of Polonnaruwa	Sri Lanka	c. 1055	1284	Capital moved to Dambadeniya
Kotte	Kotte, Kingdom of	Sri Lanka	c. 1415	c. 1565	Capital moved to Kandy
Kandy	Kandy, Kingdom of	Sri Lanka	1592	1815	Capital moved to Colombo
Colombo	British Ceylon	Sri Lanka	1815	1948	colony acquired dominion status
Colombo	Ceylon, Dominion of	Sri Lanka	1948	1972	Dominion became republic
Colombo	Sri Lanka	Sri Lanka	1972	1982	Capital moved to Sri Jayawardenepura Kotte

=== Western Asia ===
Old capital city	Country	Today a part of	From	Until	Change, reason
Assur	Assyria	Iraq	fl. 2600 BC	9th century BC	moved to Calah
Calah (Nimrud)	Assyria	Iraq	13th century BC	710 BC	Moved to Nineveh
Nineveh	Assyria	Iraq	1800 BC	600 BC	Destroyed by Babylonians
Babylon	Babylonia	Iraq	24th century BC	141 BC	Conquered by Assyrians, Persians, Parthians, Alexander the Great, later abandoned completely
Kufa	Rashidun Caliphate	Iraq	656	661	Capital moved to Damascus by Umayyad Caliphate
Kufa	Abbasid Caliphate	Iraq	750	762	Capital moved to Baghdad
Anbar	Abbasid Caliphate	Iraq	750s	762	Alongside with Kufa, it briefly became the capital of the Abbasid Caliphate before the founding of Baghdad.
Samarra	Abbasid Caliphate	Iraq	836	892	Capital moved back to Baghdad
Mtskheta	Iberia, Kingdom of	Georgia	3rd century BC	5th century	Capital moved to Tbilisi by Dachi of Iberia
Susa, Anshan (Persia)	Proto-Elamite, Elam	Iran	3200 BC	850 BC	Conquered by Mannaeans
Zirta (Izirtu)	Mannaeans	Iran	850 BC	728 BC	Conquered by Median Empire
Ecbatana	Median Empire	Iran	728 BC	550 BC	captured by Cyrus the Great
Pasargadae	Persian Empire	Iran	559 BC	538 BC	Capital moved to Susa by Cambyses II
Susa	Persian Empire	Iran	538 BC	515 BC	Capital moved to Persepolis by Darius
Persepolis	Persian Empire	Iran	515 BC	331 BC	captured by Alexander the Great and incorporated into Macedonian Empire
Seleucia	Seleucid Empire	Iran	305 BC	240 BC	moved to Antioch
Antioch	Seleucid Empire	Iran	240 BC	64 BC	conquered by Roman Republic
Ctesiphon, Hecatompylos, Mithridatkird-Nisa, Asaak	Parthian Empire	Iran	240 BC	224	conquered by Sassanid Empire
Firouzabad, Ctesiphon, Damghan	Sassanid Empire	Iran	224	637	fell in Islamic conquest of Persia
Nishapur	Tahirid dynasty	Iran	821	873	conquered by Saffarid dynasty
Zaranj, Amol	Saffarid dynasty, Alavids	Iran	861	900	conquered by Samanid
Bukhara, Balkh, Samarkand, Herat	Samanid dynasty	Iran	875	999	conquered by Ghaznavids
Ghazni	Ghaznavids, Ghurids	Iran	963	1212	conquered by Seljuq dynasty
Nishapur, Rey, Konye-Urgench	Seljuq dynasty, Khwarezmid dynasty	Iran	1037	1231	conquered by Ilkhanate
Maragheh	Ilkhanate	Iran	1256	1265	Capital moved to Tabriz.
Tabriz	Ilkhanate	Iran	1265	1306	Capital moved to Soltaniyeh.
Soltaniyeh	Ilkhanate	Iran	1306	1335	After Abu Sa'id's death in 1335, the Ilkhanate began to disintegrate rapidly and split up into several rival successor states.
Tabriz	Safavid dynasty	Iran	1501	1548	moved to Qazvin
Qazvin	Safavid dynasty	Iran	1548	1598	moved to Isfahan
Isfahan	Safavid dynasty	Iran	1598	1736	moved to Mashhad
Mashhad	Afsharid dynasty	Iran	1736	1750	moved to Shiraz
Shiraz	Zand dynasty	Iran	1750	1782	moved to Sari
Sari	Qajar dynasty	Iran	1782	1795	moved to Tehran
Gibeah	Israel, Kingdom of	Israel	c. 1030 BC	c. 1010 BC	moved to Mahanaim
Mahanaim	Israel, Kingdom of	Jordan	c. 1010 BC	c. 1007 BC	moved to Hebron
Hebron	Israel, Kingdom of	West Bank	c. 1007 BC	c. 1000 BC	moved to Jerusalem; after the kingdom had been reunited by King David, he is said to have conquered the city from a Canaanite tribe
Jerusalem	Israel, Kingdom of	Israel	c. 1000 BC	c. 930 BC	country split in two
Jerusalem	Judah, Kingdom of (southern part)	Israel	c. 930 BC	586 BC	Kingdom ceased to exist (Jerusalem destroyed; Babylonian exile 586 BC - 538 BC)
Shechem	Israel, Kingdom of (northern part)	West Bank	c. 930 BC	c. 930 BC	moved to Penuel
Penuel	Israel, Kingdom of (northern part)	Jordan	c. 930 BC	c. 909 BC	moved to Tirzah
Tirzah	Israel, Kingdom of (northern part)	West Bank	c. 909 BC	c. 880 BC	moved to Samaria
Samaria	Israel, Kingdom of (northern part)	West Bank	c. 880 BC	c. 720 BC	Kingdom ceased to exist (much of its population was taken into captivity and deported by Assyrian empire)
Tel Aviv	Israel, State of	Israel	6 May 1948	30 December 1948	interim de facto capital, moved to Jerusalem after captured from Jordanian forces in 1948 Arab–Israeli War
Jerusalem	Jerusalem, Kingdom of	Israel	1099	1187	moved to Acre (Jerusalem captured by Saladin)
Acre	Jerusalem, Kingdom of	Israel	1187	1291	Kingdom ceased to exist
Salalah	Oman, Imamate of	Oman	1932	1970	moved to Musqat
Diriyah	Diriyah, Emirate of	Saudi Arabia	1744	1818	moved to Riyadh after the Turks destroyed the city.
Aden	South Yemen	Yemen	1967	1990	San'a, country ceased to exist after unification of Yemen
Damascus	Umayyad Caliphate	Syria	661	744	Moved to Harran.
Harran	Umayyad Caliphate	Turkey	744	750	Moved to Córdoba.
Goris	Mountainous Armenia, Republic of	Armenia	1920	1921	
Ganja	Azerbaijan Democratic Republic	Azerbaijan	May 1918	September 1918	Moved to Baku.

== Europe ==
=== Central Europe ===
Old capital city	Country	Today a part of	From	Until	Change, reason
Prague	Czechoslovakia	Czech Republic	1918	1993	became capital in Czech Republic
Székesfehérvár and Esztergom	Hungary, Kingdom of	Hungary	972 (or 973)	1256	moved from Esztergom to Buda after most of the city was destroyed by the Mongols in 1242
Buda	Hungary, Kingdom of	Hungary	1361	1536	moved to Pressburg (Pozsony) after part of the nation captured by Ottoman Empire
Pozsony (Bratislava)	Hungary, Kingdom of	Slovakia	1536	1784	moved here because Turks captured Buda; in 1784 it was moved back to Buda
Buda	Hungary, Kingdom of	Hungary	1784	1849	Became part of Austrian Empire, capital in Vienna.
Buda	Lands of the Crown of Saint Stephen (under Austria-Hungary)	Hungary	1867	1873	united with Óbuda and Pest to become Budapest
Płock	Masovia (under Miecław)	Poland	c. 1038	1047	Masovia reincorporated into Poland
Płock	Masovia, Duchy of	Poland	1138	1313	moved to Czersk
Czersk	Masovia, Duchy of	Poland	1313	1413	moved to Warsaw
Warsaw	Masovia, Duchy of	Poland	1413	1526	Masovia reincorporated into Poland
Gniezno	Poland, Kingdom of	Poland	10th century	1038	moved to Kraków
Poznań	Poland, Kingdom of	Poland	10th century	1038	moved to Kraków
Kraków	Poland, Kingdom of	Poland	1038	1079	moved to Płock
Płock	Poland, Kingdom of	Poland	1079	1138	moved to Kraków
Kraków	Poland, Kingdom of	Poland	1138	1290	moved to Poznań
Poznań	Poland, Kingdom of	Poland	1290	1296	moved to Kraków
Kraków	Poland, Kingdom of	Poland	1296	1795	informally moved in 1596 to Warsaw
Toruń	Warsaw, Duchy of	Poland	1809	1809	de facto capital
Lublin	Polish Committee of National Liberation	Poland	1944	1945	de facto capital
Łódź	Polish People's Republic	Poland	1945	1947	de facto capital

=== Eastern Europe ===
Old capital city	Country	Today a part of	From	Until	Change, reason
Phanagoria	Old Great Bulgaria	Russia	632	665	
Novgorod	Kievan Rus'	Russia	862	882	moved to Kiev
Kiev (Kyiv)	Kievan Rus'	Ukraine	882	1169	state broke up, moved to Vladimir, Halych and Novgorod
Vladimir	Grand Duchy of Vladimir	Russia	1169	1327	moved to Moscow
Bolghar	Volga Bulgaria	Russia	8th century	1240s	Volga Bulgaria lost sovereignty
Kazan	Kazan Khanate	Russia	1438	1552	Kazan Khanate lost sovereignty
Moscow	Moscow, Grand Duchy of	Russia	1327	1547	
Moscow	Russia, Tsardom of	Russia	1547	1712	moved to Saint Petersburg
Yaroslavl	Russia, Tsardom of	Russia	1611	1612	de facto
Saint Petersburg	Russia, Tsardom of	Russia	1712	1721	The Russian Tsardom became the Russian Empire.
Saint Petersburg	Russian Empire	Russia	1721	1727	Empire was officially proclaimed by Tsar Peter I, following the Treaty of Nystad (1721).
Moscow	Russian Empire	Russia	1727	1731	moved to Saint Petersburg
Saint Petersburg	Russian Empire	Russia	1731	1914	City renamed Petrograd.
Petrograd (Saint Petersburg)	Russian Empire	Russia	1914	1918	moved to Moscow
Moscow	Soviet Union	Russia	1922	1991	State union dissolved, Became capital of Russia
Volodymyr	Galicia–Volhynia, Kingdom of	Ukraine	1199	1238	moved to Halych
Halych	Galicia–Volhynia, Kingdom of	Ukraine	1238	1241	moved to Kholm (Chełm)
Kholm (Chełm)	Galicia–Volhynia, Kingdom of	Poland	1241	1272	moved to Lev (Lviv)
Lev (Lviv)	Galicia–Volhynia, Kingdom of	Ukraine	1272	1349	Kingdom of Galicia–Volhynia lost its sovereignty
Chyhyryn	Cossack Hetmanate	Ukraine	1648	1669	moved to Baturyn
Baturyn	Cossack Hetmanate	Ukraine	1669	1708	moved to Hlukhiv after demolition of the city by Russian forces
Hlukhiv	Cossack Hetmanate	Ukraine	1708	1722	Cossack Hetmanate lost its sovereignty
Hlukhiv	Cossack Hetmanate	Ukraine	1727	1734	Cossack Hetmanate lost its sovereignty
Baturyn	Cossack Hetmanate	Ukraine	1750	1764	Cossack Hetmanate lost its sovereignty
Kiev (Kyiv)	Ukrainian People's Republic	Ukraine	1917	1920	Ukrainian People's Republic lost its sovereignty
Taganrog	Ukrainian Soviet Republic	Russia	1918	1918	German forces captured the city. Republic dissolved.
Lviv	West Ukrainian People's Republic	Ukraine	1918	1918	Polish forces captured the city
Ternopil	West Ukrainian People's Republic	Ukraine	1918	1919	
Stanislaviv (Ivano-Frankivsk)	West Ukrainian People's Republic	Ukraine	1919	1919	
Kharkiv	Ukrainian SSR	Ukraine	1919	1934	moved to Kiev (Kyiv)
Uzhhorod	Carpatho-Ukraine	Ukraine	1938	1938	Parts of the territory including Uzhhorod were transferred to the Kingdom of Hungary as a result of First Vienna Award. Capital moved to Khust.
Khust	Carpatho-Ukraine	Ukraine	1938	1939	Carpatho-Ukraine lost its sovereignty.

=== Northern Europe ===
Old capital city	Country	Today a part of	From	Until	Change, reason
Roskilde	Denmark	Denmark	c. 1020	1443	moved to Copenhagen
Ribe	North Sea Empire	Denmark	1016	1035	Empire collapsed with the death of Cnut the Great.
Copenhagen	Kalmar Union	Denmark	1443	1524	
Copenhagen	Denmark–Norway	Denmark	1524	1814	
Turku	Finland, Grand Duchy of	Finland	1809	1812	moved to Helsinki
Vaasa	Finland, Republic of	Finland	1918	1918	Temporary capital during the Civil War
Ferns	Laighin (Leinster) (under Dermot MacMurrough)	Ireland	6th century	12th century	Ireland invaded by Normans
Cashel	Munster, Kingdom of	Ireland	1st century BC	1118	Division of Munster into Desmond and Thomond
Kilkenny	Ireland, Confederate	Ireland	1642	1651	Cromwellian conquest of Ireland
Kernavė	Lithuania, Grand Duchy of	Lithuania	1279	1321	moved to Trakai
Trakai	Lithuania, Grand Duchy of	Lithuania	c. 1321	c. 1323	moved to Vilnius
Kaunas	Lithuania, Republic of (details)	Lithuania	1922	1940	moved back to Vilnius
Nidaros (Trondheim)	Kingdom of Norway (872–1397)	Norway	997	1217	moved to Bergen
Bjørgvin (Bergen)	Kingdom of Norway (872–1397)	Norway	1217	1299	moved to Oslo
Christiania (Oslo)	Norway	Norway	1905	1925	(also written Kristiania from ca. 1877), renamed Oslo
Gamla Uppsala	Sweden, Kingdom of	Sweden	9th century	1273	moved to Uppsala
Uppsala	Sweden, Kingdom of	Sweden	1273	1436	moved to Stockholm
Din Guardi (Bamburgh Castle)	Bryneich	United Kingdom	420	547	conquering of the Kingdom
Chelmsford	England, Kingdom of	United Kingdom	1 July 1381	6 July 1381	Briefly moved from London due to Peasants' Revolt
Bebbanburgh (Bamburgh)	Bernicia	United Kingdom	547	634	merged with Deira to become Northumbria
Ebrauc (York)	Deira	United Kingdom	5th century	866	merged with Bernicia to become Northumbria
Lisnaskea	Fermanagh	Northern Ireland, United Kingdom	10th century	1607	Disestablished alongside the kingdom following the Flight of the Earls
York	Northumbria	United Kingdom	834	866	fall of the Kingdom
Dorchester on Thames	Wessex	United Kingdom	634	686	moved to Winchester
Rendlesham	East Anglia, Kingdom of	United Kingdom	6th century	1017	absorbed into England
Winchester	Wessex	United Kingdom	686	927	formation of England
Winchester	England, Kingdom of	United Kingdom	927	1066	moved to London
Castletown	Man, Isle of	United Kingdom	1090	1874	moved to Douglas
Tamworth	Mercia	United Kingdom	7th century	927	fall of Kingdom, superseded by Winchester
Dumbarton	Strathclyde, Kingdom of	Scotland, United Kingdom	c 5th Century	870	Moved to Govan, now part of Glasgow, following 4 months of Viking military assault in 870.
Govan	Strathclyde, Kingdom of	Scotland, United Kingdom	870	c 1034	Conquered by Duncan II, and became part of Scotland.
Kirkjuvagr	Norðreyjar, Territory of the Norwegian Realm	Scotland, United Kingdom	c 872	1472	Absorbed into Scotland.
Scone, near Perth	Scotland, Kingdom of	United Kingdom	846	1452	moved to Edinburgh
Edinburgh	Scotland, Kingdom of	United Kingdom	1452	1707	Scotland was united with England under one monarch in 1603. Edinburgh remains the capital of Scotland within the United Kingdom.
Machynlleth	Wales, Principality of	United Kingdom	1404	1416	seat of Owain Glyndŵr's self-proclaimed parliament. Capital declared to be Cardiff in 1955
York	Scandinavian York	United Kingdom	875	954	fall of kingdom
Camulodunum (Colchester)	Roman Britain	United Kingdom	43	61	moved to Londinium (London) after being destroyed by Boudica.

=== Southern Europe ===
==== South-central Europe ====
Old capital city	Country	Today a part of	From	Until	Change, reason
Corte	Corsica, Republic of	France	1755	1769	Corsican Republic annexed by France
Corte	Anglo-Corsican Kingdom	France	1794	1795	moved to Bastia
Bastia	Anglo-Corsican Kingdom	France	1795	1796	Corsican Kingdom annexed by France
Chambéry	Savoy, Duchy of	France	1416	1562	moved to Turin
Tharros	Arborea, Giudicato of	Italy	9th century	1070	moved to Oristano
Oristano	Arborea, Giudicato of	Italy	1070	1410	moved to Sassari
Sassari	Arborea, Giudicato of	Italy	1410	1420	remaining territories sold to the Kingdom of Sardinia
Santa Igia	Cagliari, Giudicato of	Italy	9th century	1258	country dissolved, territories annexed by Arborea, Gallura, Pisa and Gherardesca
Milan	Cisalpine Republic	Italy	1797	1802	became the Italian Republic
Florence	Etruria, Kingdom of	Italy	1801	1807	Kingdom of Etruria annexed by France
Ferrara	Ferrara, Duchy of	Italy	1471	1597	annexed by the papacy
Florence	Florence, Duchy of	Italy	1532	1569	became Grand Duchy of Tuscany
Florence	Florence, Republic of	Italy	1115	1532	became Duchy of Florence
Olbia	Gallura, Giudicato of	Italy	9th century	1296	country dissolved, territories annexed by Pisa and Arborea
Genoa	Genoa, Republic of	Italy	11th century	1805	annexed by France
Milan	Italian Republic	Italy	1802	1805	Became the Kingdom of Italy
Salò	Italian Social Republic	Italy	1943	1945	Republic ceased to exist
Milan	Italy, Kingdom of (Napoleonic)	Italy	1805	1814	Kingdom ceased to exist
Turin	Italy, Kingdom of (Sardinian)	Italy	1861	1865	moved to Florence
Florence	Italy, Kingdom of (Sardinian)	Italy	1865	1871	moved to Rome
Rome	Italy, Kingdom of (Sardinian)	Italy	1871	1946	Kingdom became Republic
Milan	Lombardo-Venetian Kingdom	Italy	1815	1859	Milan ceded to Kingdom of Sardinia
Venice	Lombardo-Venetian Kingdom	Italy	1859	1866	Kingdom annexed by Kingdom of Italy
Lucca	Lucca, Duchy of	Italy	1815	1847	Duchy annexed by Grand Duchy of Tuscany
Lucca	Lucca, Republic of	Italy	1288	1805	Republic annexed by France
Mantua	Mantua, Duchy of	Italy	1433	1708	attached to the Duchy of Milan
Milan	Milan, Duchy of	Italy	1395	1797	became part of the Cisalpine Republic
Modena	Modena, Duchy of	Italy	1452	1860	became part of united Italy
Naples	Naples, Kingdom of	Italy	1282	1816	Kingdom of Naples merged into the Kingdom of the Two Sicilies
Piacenza	Parma, Duchy of	Italy	1545	1547	moved to Parma, following the assassination of the Duke Pierluigi Farnese
Parma	Parma (and Piacenza), Duchy of	Italy	1547	1860	Became part of united Italy
Cagliari	Sardinia, Kingdom of	Italy	1324	1720	moved to Turin
Turin	Sardinia, Kingdom of	Italy	1720	1861	Became part of unified Italy
Sassari	Sassari, Republic of	Italy	1294	1323	Became part of Kingdom of Sardinia
Turin	Savoy, Duchy of	Italy	1562	1720	Became part of Kingdom of Sardinia
Palermo	Sicily, Kingdom of	Italy	1130	1816	Kingdom merged into the Kingdom of the Two Sicilies
Catania	Trinacria, Kingdom of	Italy	1282	1401	Capital moved to Palermo. After 1302 the Kingdom of Sicily was sometimes called the Kingdom of Trinacria.
Porto Torres	Torres, Giudicato of	Italy	9th century	11th century	moved to Ardara
Ardara	Torres, Giudicato of	Italy	11th century	1272	moved to Sassari
Sassari	Torres, Giudicato of	Italy	1272	1280	country dissolved, territories annexed by Malaspina, Doria, Pisa and Arborea
Trieste	Trieste, Free Territory of	Italy	1947	1954	Territory dissolved, integrated into Italy and Yugoslavia
Florence	Tuscany, Grand Duchy of	Italy	1569	1860	became part of unified Italy
Siena	Siena, Republic of	Italy	1125	1555	Conquered by Florence
Naples	Two Sicilies, Kingdom of the	Italy	1816	1861	became part of unified Italy
Urbino	Urbino, Duchy of	Italy	1443	1523	moved to Pesaro
Pesaro	Urbino, Duchy of	Italy	1523	1625	annexed by the papacy
Venice	Venice, Republic of	Italy	fl. 9th century	1797	annexed by Austria
Rabat	Gozitan Nation	Malta	1798	1801	became part of the British Protectorate of Malta
Mdina	Part of Kingdom of Sicily	Malta	700 BC	1530	moved to Birgu upon arrival of the Order of Saint John
Birgu	History of Malta under the Order of Saint John	Malta	1530	1571	moved to Valletta

==== South-eastern Europe ====
Old capital city	Country	Today a part of	From	Until	Change, reason
Gjirokastër	Arbanon, Principality of	Albania	1190	1255	
Durrës	Albania, Kingdom of	Albania	1272	1368	
Durrës	Albania, Principality of	Albania	1368	1392	
Krujë	Gjirokastër, Principality of	Albania	1286	1418	
Berat	Berat, Lordship of	Albania	1335	1444	Berat became part of the League of Lezhë.
Lezhë	Dukagjini, Principality of	Albania	1387	1444	Dukagjini became part of the League of Lezhë.
Krujë	Kastrioti, Principality of	Albania	1389	1444	Kastrioti became part of the League of Lezhë
Lezhë	Lezhë, League of	Albania	1444	1450	
Vlorë	Albania, Independent	Albania	1912	1914	moved to Durrës
Durrës	Albania, Principality of	Albania	1914	1920	moved to Tirana
Pliska	Bulgarian Empire, First	Bulgaria	681	893	moved to Preslav
Preslav	Bulgarian Empire, First	Bulgaria	893	971	capital of First Bulgarian Empire (moved to Ohrid)
Ohrid	Bulgarian Empire, First	North Macedonia	971	1018	Empire ceased to exist after the Byzantine conquest
Tarnovo	Bulgarian Empire, Second	Bulgaria	1185	1393	Tarnovo was conquered by the Ottoman Empire
Vidin	Bulgarian Empire, Second	Bulgaria	1356	1418?	Splinter state of the Second Bulgarian Empire, Vidin was conquered by the Ottoman Empire
Tarnovo	Bulgaria, Principality of	Bulgaria	1878	1879	moved to Sofia
Plovdiv	Eastern Rumelia	Bulgaria	1878	1885	annexed as part of the Unification of Bulgaria
Ragusa (Dubrovnik)	Ragusa, Republic of	Croatia	7th century	1808	annexed by France
Varaždin	Croatia, Kingdom of	Croatia	1756	1776	Moved back to Zagreb, when a fire destroyed most of the city.
Fiume (Rijeka)	Fiume, Free State of	Croatia	1920	1924	annexed by Kingdom of Italy
Chania	Cretan State	Greece	1898	1913	Cretan State united with Greece
Corfu	Septinsular Republic	Greece	1800	1815	Succeeded by the United States of the Ionian Islands, an amical protectorate of the United Kingdom, which had Corfu as its capital, too, until 1864, when the island country became part of the Kingdom of Greece.
Nafplio	Hellenic Republic, First	Greece	1821	1836	moved to Athens
Aegina	Hellenic Republic, First	Greece	1827	1829	moved back to Nafplio
Siret	Moldavia, Principality of	Romania	1354	1388	moved to Suceava
Suceava	Moldavia, Principality of	Romania	1388	1564	moved to Iași
Iași	Moldavia, Principality of	Romania	1564	1859	unified with Wallachia to form United Principalities of Romania
Iași	Romanian United Principalities	Romania	1859	1862	one of the two capitals of the United Principalities, then moved to Bucharest
Bucharest	Romanian United Principalities	Romania	1859	1916	moved to Iași after partial occupation of the Kingdom of Romania during World War I
Iași	Romania, Kingdom of	Romania	1916	1918	moved back to Bucharest
Curtea de Argeș	Wallachia, Principality of	Romania	fl.13th century	fl.15th century	
Câmpulung	Wallachia, Principality of	Romania	fl.13th century	fl.15th century	moved to Târgoviște
Târgoviște	Wallachia, Principality of	Romania	1418	1659	moved to Bucharest
Bucharest	Wallachia, Principality of	Romania	1659	1859	unified with Moldavia to form United Principalities of Romania
Constantinople (Istanbul)	Byzantine Empire	Turkey	330 AD	661 AD	Emperor Constans II relocated his capital to Syracuse in Sicily.
Syracuse	Byzantine Empire	Italy	661 AD	668 AD	Constans II was assassinated and the seat of Byzantine government was returned to Constantinople.
Constantinople (Istanbul)	Byzantine Empire	Turkey	668 AD	1204	The Fourth Crusade set out to replace the Greek Orthodox Byzantine Empire with a Latin version and there were several Byzantine successor states, the most memorable of which being the Empire of Nicaea.
Nicaea (İznik)	Byzantine Empire	Turkey	1204	1261	When the Empire of Nicaea recaptured Constantinople, they relocated the capital there as well
Constantinople (Istanbul)	Byzantine Empire	Turkey	1261	1453	Byzantine Empire fell and conquered by the Ottoman Empire.
Bursa	Ottoman Empire	Turkey	1335	1365	moved to Edirne
Edirne	Ottoman Empire	Turkey	1365	1453	moved to Istanbul (Constantinople)
Istanbul	Ottoman Empire	Turkey	1453	1923	The Ottoman Empire became the Republic of Turkey. The capital moved to Ankara.
Cetinje	Montenegro, Prince-Bishopric of	Montenegro	1696	1852	
Cetinje	Montenegro, Principality of	Montenegro	1852	1910	
Cetinje	Montenegro, Kingdom of	Montenegro	1910	1918	Became part of Kingdom of Yugoslavia. Capital of SR Montenegro moved to Titograd (Podgorica) in 1946.
Stari Ras	Serbia, Grand Principality of	Serbia	950 AD	1234	capital of the Grand Principality of Serbia, and the historical region of Raška
Prapratna	Duklja	Montenegro	...	1042	moved to Skadar
Skadar (Shkodër)	Duklja, Zeta	Albania	1042	1385	moved to Ulcinj (Olcinium)
Debrc	Serbia, Kingdom of	Serbia	1276	1289	moved to Belgrade
Prizren	Serbia, Kingdom of	Serbia	1300	1345	moved to Skopje
Skoplje	Serbian Empire	North Macedonia	1345	1371	capital of Serbian Empire, now capital of North Macedonia
Kruševac	Serbia, Moravian	Serbia	1371	1405	capital of Serbia, moved to Belgrade
Ulcinj (Olcinium)	Zeta	Montenegro	1385	1403	moved to Bar (Antivari)
Bar (Antivari)	Zeta	Montenegro	1403	1408	
Belgrade	Serbian Despotate	Serbia	1405	1427	
Skadar (Shkodër)	Zeta	Montenegro	1408	1474	moved to Žabljak (Žabljak Crnojevića)
Smederevo	Serbian Despotate	Serbia	1430	1453	
Žabljak Crnojevića	Zeta	Montenegro	1474	1475	moved to Obod
Obod	Zeta	Montenegro	1475	1482	moved to Cetinje
Subotica	Jovan Nenad's Empire	Serbia	1526	1527	
Kragujevac	Serbia, Principality of	Serbia	1818	1841	moved to Belgrade
Belgrade	Yugoslavia, Kingdom of	Serbia	1918	1945	
Belgrade	Yugoslavia, Socialist Federal Republic of	Serbia	1945	1992	
Belgrade	Yugoslavia, Federal Republic of/ Serbia and Montenegro, State Union of	Serbia	1992	2006	State union dissolved, became capital of Serbia

==== South-western Europe ====
Old capital city	Country	Today a part of	From	Until	Change, reason
Barcelona	Barcelona, County of	Spain	801	1162	
Burgos	Castile, Crown of	Spain	11th century	15th century	moved to Valladolid
Toledo	Castile, Crown of	Spain	15th century	1469	moved to Valladolid
Valladolid	Castile, Crown of	Spain	1469	1561	moved to Madrid. Was briefly the Spanish capital again from 1601 to 1606.
Barcelona	Catalonia, Principality of	Spain	1173	1714	
Córdoba	Córdoba, Emirate of	Spain	756	929	Succeeded by Caliphate of Córdoba.
Córdoba	Córdoba, Caliphate of	Spain	929	1031	country dissolved, became part of Taifa of Córdoba
Santiago	Couto Mixto	Spain	12th century	1864	Couto Mixto annexed by Spain and Portugal
Granada	Granada, Emirate of	Spain	1250	1492	Emirate ceased to exist after the Reconquista and incorporated into Castile
Guimarães	Portugal, Kingdom of	Portugal	1128	1179	moved to Coimbra
Coimbra	Portugal, Kingdom of	Portugal	1179	1255	moved to Lisbon
Valencia	Spanish Republic, Second	Spain	1936	1937	Provisional Government of the Second Spanish Republic in the Spanish Civil War
Barcelona	Spanish Republic, Second	Spain	1937	1939	Provisional Government of the Second Spanish Republic in the Spanish Civil War
Alcalá de Henares	Spanish Republic, Second	Spain	1939	1939	Provisional Government of the Second Spanish Republic in the Spanish Civil War
Barcelona	Visigothic Kingdom	Spain	507	546	moved to Toledo
Barcelona	Crown of Aragon and Catalan Republic	Spain	801	1715	annexed by Spain and France
Toledo	Visigothic Kingdom	Spain	546	711	Kingdom fell and captured by Umayyad Caliphate

=== Western Europe ===
Old capital city	Country	Today a part of	From	Until	Change, reason
Vienna	Austrian Empire	Austria	1806	1867	became capital of the Austro-Hungarian Empire
Vienna	Austro-Hungarian Empire	Austria	1867	1918	became capital of the Republic of Austria after Empire collapsed
Tournai	Francia	Belgium	431	486	Under kings Childeric I and Clovis I, Tournai was the capital of the Frankish empire. In the year 486, Clovis moved the centre of power to Paris, as a result, the Low Countries region ceased to be the political centre of the Frankish empire.
Kelmis	Neutral Moresnet	Belgium	1816	1919	Moresnet annexed by Belgium
Vichy	France, State of	France	1940	1944	capital of Vichy France régime, defeated by Allies
Aachen	Carolingian Empire	Germany	800	814	became capital of Charlemagne as Imperator Augustus and Emperor of the Carolingian Empire
Karlsruhe	Baden, Grand Duchy of	Germany	1771	1918	Baden became part of the German Empire in 1871, and lost sovereignty fully in 1918. Karlsruhe remained the capital of the German state of Baden until 1945.
Munich	Bavaria, Kingdom of	Germany	14th century	1918	Bavaria became part of the German Empire in 1871, and lost sovereignty fully in 1918. Munich remains the capital of the German state of Bavaria.
Braunschweig (Brunswick)	Brunswick, Duchy of	Germany	1815	1918	Brunswick became part of the German Empire in 1871, and lost sovereignty fully in 1918. Braunschweig remained the capital of the German Free State of Brunswick until 1946 when it became part of the German state of Lower Saxony.
Frankfurt	Rhine, Confederation of the	Germany	1806	1815	Confederation dissolved
Frankfurt	German Confederation	Germany	1815	1866	German Confederation dissolved
Berlin	German Empire	Germany	1871	1918	
Berlin	Germany (Weimar Republic)	Germany	1919	1933	
Berlin	Germany (Nazi Germany)	Germany	1933	1945	Separation of Germany into occupation zones for the Allied powers. Capital moved to Flensburg temporarily under control of then-president Karl Dönitz.
Flensburg	Germany (Nazi Germany)	Germany	1945	1945	Lost all of its jurisdictions after the Surrender of Germany, still operated until 23 May when cabinet members were arrested.
Bonn	Germany, West	Germany	1949	1990	Moved to Berlin after re-unification of Germany. Bonn retained as the German seat of government until 1999.
East Berlin	Germany, East	Germany	1949	1990	East Berlin and West Berlin merged to form reunified Berlin, country ceased to exist after reunification of Germany
Hanover	Hanover, Kingdom of	Germany	1814	1866	Hanover annexed by Prussia, became capital of the Prussian Province of Hanover, currently the capital of the German state of Lower Saxony
Darmstadt	Hesse-Darmstadt, Landgraviate of, Hesse, Grand Duchy of	Germany	1567	1918	Hesse-Darmstadt became part of the German Empire in 1871, and lost sovereignty fully in 1918. Darmstadt remained the capital of the German People's State of Hesse until 1945.
Kassel	Hesse-Darmstadt, Landgraviate of, Hesse-Kassel, Landgraviate of, Hesse, Electorate of	Germany	1277	1866	Hesse-Kassel annexed by Prussia in 1866; Kassel became capital of the Prussian province of Hesse-Nassau
Wiesbaden	Nassau, Duchy of	Germany	1816	1866	Nassau annexed by Prussia, currently the capital of the German state of Hesse
Oldenburg	Oldenburg, Duchy of	Germany	1180	1918	Oldenburg became part of the German Empire in 1871, and lost sovereignty fully in 1918. Oldenburg remained the capital of the German Free State of Oldenburg until 1946 when it became part of the German state of Lower Saxony.
Heidelberg	Palatinate, Electorate of the	Germany	14th century	1720	moved to Mannheim
Mannheim	Palatinate, Electorate of the	Germany	1720	1777	Palatinate inherited by the Electors of Bavaria.
Dresden	Saxony, Kingdom of	Germany	1485	1918	Saxony became part of the German Empire in 1871, and lost sovereignty fully in 1918. Dresden remained the capital of the German state of Saxony until Saxony itself lost its statehood in 1952 when it was part of East Germany. Dresden became again the capital of Saxony in 1990 following reunification.
Bückeburg	Schaumburg-Lippe, Principality of	Germany	1643	1918	Schaumburg-Lippe became part of the German Empire in 1871, and lost sovereignty fully in 1918. Bückeburg remained the capital of the German Free State of Schaumburg-Lippe until 1946 when it became part of the German state of Lower Saxony.
Kassel	Westphalia, Kingdom of	Germany	1807	1813	dissolved in 1813
Stuttgart	Württemberg, Kingdom of	Germany	c. 1300	1918	Württemberg became part of the German Empire in 1871, and lost sovereignty fully in 1918. Stuttgart remained the capital of the German state of Württemberg until 1945 when it became the capital of newly established state of Württemberg-Baden, and then became capital of the German state of Baden-Württemberg.
Zürich	Old Swiss Confederacy	Switzerland	1415	1530	Vorort of the Swiss diet, after 1530 partially replaced by Lucerne.
Aarau	Helvetic Republic	Switzerland	1798	1798	moved to Lucerne
Lucerne	Helvetic Republic	Switzerland	1798	1803	Helvetic Republic abolished

== North America ==
Old capital city	Country, empire	From	Until	Change, reason
James Town	Barbados	1625	1628	moved to Bridgetown, purpose-built
St. George	Bermuda	1612	1815	moved to Hamilton
Belize City	British Honduras	1638	1970	moved to Belmopan because of the devastating effects of Hurricane Hattie in 1961 and Belize City earthquake in 1968
Chan Santa Cruz	Chan Santa Cruz	c. 1852	1901	became part of Mexico
Cartago	Costa Rica	1562	1823	moved to San José
Santiago de Cuba	Cuba	1522	1589	moved (after 1607 in Havana)
Santiago de los Caballeros	Dominican Republic	1863	1865	Dominican Restoration War
Antigua	Guatemala	1525	1776	New capital of Guatemala City founded after Antigua destroyed three times by major earthquakes.
Spanish Town	Jamaica	1534	1872	moved to Kingston
Cap-Français	Saint-Domingue	1711	1804	moved to Port-au-Prince
Quetzaltenango	Los Altos	1838	1840	country ceased to exist
Granada and León	Nicaragua	1821	1857	moved to Managua
St. John's	Newfoundland	1907	1949	entered confederation within Canada and became the country's 10th province
Washington, D.C.	Philippine Commonwealth	May 1942	October 1944	returned to the Philippines subsequent to the end of the Japanese occupation of the Philippines in World War II
Old Road Town	Saint Kitts	1623	1727	capital moved to Basseterre
San Jose de Oruña (Saint Joseph)	British Trinidad	1592	1783	moved to Port of Spain
Caparra	Puerto Rico	1508	1521	moved to San Juan
Port of Spain and Chaguaramas	West Indies Federation	1958	1962	country ceased to exist
Mérida	Republic of Yucatán	1840	1847	Yucatán annexed by Mexico
Comayagua, Comayagua	Republic of Honduras	1540	1937	Tiburcio Carias Andino changed the capital because of its proximity to the San Juancito mines
St. John's	British Leeward Islands	1671 and 1833	1816 and 1958	

== Oceania ==
Old capital city	Country	Today a part of	From	Until	Change, reason
Melbourne	Australia	Australia	1901–1908	1927	Melbourne was the de facto seat of Government from 1901 until 1927, when in 1908, it was decided that the planned city of Canberra be the capital city and seat of Government. (Note: Melbourne is sometimes said to have been the inaugural capital of Australia, from 1901 until 1927, when Parliament House, Canberra was opened. This is not so. Section 125 of the Constitution of Australia states that the seat of government is to be within the state of New South Wales but not less than 100 miles (160 kilometres) from Sydney, and that until that place (Canberra) was built, the Parliament of Australia would meet at Melbourne. That made Melbourne the de facto (but not de jure) seat of government 1901–1927, but it did not amount to Melbourne being declared the capital, and it was never so described in contemporary documents.)
Levuka	Colony of Fiji	Fiji	1874	1877	moved to Suva
Jabor, Jaluit Atoll	Marshall Islands District	Marshall Islands	1885	1978	moved to Majuro Atoll
Kolonia	Federated States of Micronesia	Federated States of Micronesia	1986	1989	moved to Palikir
Okiato (Russell)	Colony of New Zealand	New Zealand	1840	1841	moved to Auckland. Several Māori chiefs offered land at Tāmaki-makau-rau (Auckland) so a capital could be established there.
Auckland	Colony of New Zealand	New Zealand	1841	1865	moved to Wellington. In 1863 it was proposed that the capital be moved somewhere on the shores of Cook Strait. An independent tribunal decided on the location. They visited a number of sites and chose Wellington.
Koror	Palau	Palau	1994	2006	moved to Ngerulmud
Tulagi	British Solomon Islands	Solomon Islands	1896	1942	moved to Honiara

== South America ==
Old capital city	Country	Today a part of	From	Until	Change, reason
Cuzco	Inca Empire	Peru	fl. 13th century	1534	Inca Empire conquered and taken over by the Spanish, who designated Jauja as their administration site
Coro	Venezuela, Captaincy General of	Venezuela	1527	1578	moved to Caracas to prevent an invasion due to its large coastline.
Cidade do Acre (Porto Acre)	Acre, Republic of	Brazil	1899	1900	returned to Bolivia, then incorporated into Brazil
Jauja	New Castile Governorate	Peru	1534	1535	moved to Lima along the coastline in 1535
Perquenco	Araucanía and Patagonia, Kingdom of	Chile	1860	1862	incorporated to Chile and Argentina
Paraná	Argentine Confederation	Argentina	1853	1861	moved to Buenos Aires, after the secessionist State of Buenos Aires rejoined Argentina
Salvador	Colonial Brazil	Brazil	1549	1763	moved to Rio de Janeiro
Rio de Janeiro	Portugal, Kingdom of	Brazil	1808	1815	became capital of Portugal when the Portuguese king John VI moved to the colony of Brazil during the war with Napoleonic France in 1808.
Rio de Janeiro	Portugal, Brazil and the Algarves; Kingdom of	Brazil	1815	1825	It came into being when the colony of Brazil was elevated to the rank of a Kingdom, and the Kingdoms of Portugal, Brazil and the Algarve were united as a single State by the title of The United Kingdom of Portugal, Brazil and the Algarve by a Law issued on 16 December 1815.
Rio de Janeiro	Brazil	Brazil	1763	1960	moved to Brasília
Concepción	Chile, Captaincy General of	Chile	1565	1575	moved to Santiago
Concepción del Uruguay	Entre Ríos, Republic of	Argentina	1820	1821	country dissolved (and incorporated to Argentina) after the death of Francisco Ramírez
Laguna	Juliana Republic	Brazil	1836	1836	reincorporated into the Brazilian Empire after the Ragamuffin War
Purificación (near Paysandú)	Liga Federal	Uruguay	1815	1820	country dissolved
San Miguel de Tucumán	Tucumán, Republic of	Argentina	1820	1821	country dissolved and incorporated to Argentina
Tacna	Peru–Bolivian Confederation	Peru	1837	1839	country ceased to exist
Piratini	Riograndense Republic	Brazil	1836	1845	reincorporated into the Brazilian Empire after the Ragamuffin War
Pasto	Grenadine Confederation	Colombia	1862	1862	country ceased to exist
Ibagué	United Provinces of New Granada	Colombia	1811	1812	Moved to Villa de Leyva
Villa de Leyva	United Provinces of New Granada	Colombia	1812	1812	Moved to Tunja
Tunja	United Provinces of New Granada	Colombia	1812	1814	Moved to Bogotá after the United Provinces of New Granada manage to conquer Bogotá from the Free and Independent State of Cundinamarca during the Colombian War of Independence. Country ceased to exist in 1816 and is reestablished as Colombia in 1819, with Bogotá as its capital.

== See also ==
- List of former sovereign states
- List of sovereign states by date of formation
- Historical capitals of China
  - Former capitals of Chinese provinces
- List of historical capitals of Egypt
- Institutional seats of the European Union
- List of capitals of France
- Capital of Germany
- List of capitals of India
- List of capitals of Myanmar
- List of historical capitals of Norway
- List of capitals in the United States
  - List of state and territorial capitols in the United States
