= List of lighthouses in the Collectivity of Saint Martin =

This is a list of lighthouses in Saint Martin.

== Lighthouses ==
Name	Image	Year built	Location & coordinates	Class of light	Height tower	NGA number	Admiralty number	Range nml
Marigot Lighthouse	Image	n/a	Marigot; 18°04′15.8″N 63°05′11.5″W	Fl WRG 4s.	10 metres (33 ft)	14732	J5658	white: 11 red: 7 green: 7

== See also ==
- Lists of lighthouses and lightvessels
