= St. Martin of Tours' Church, Marigot =

St. Martin of Tours' Church
- Église de Saint Martin de Tours
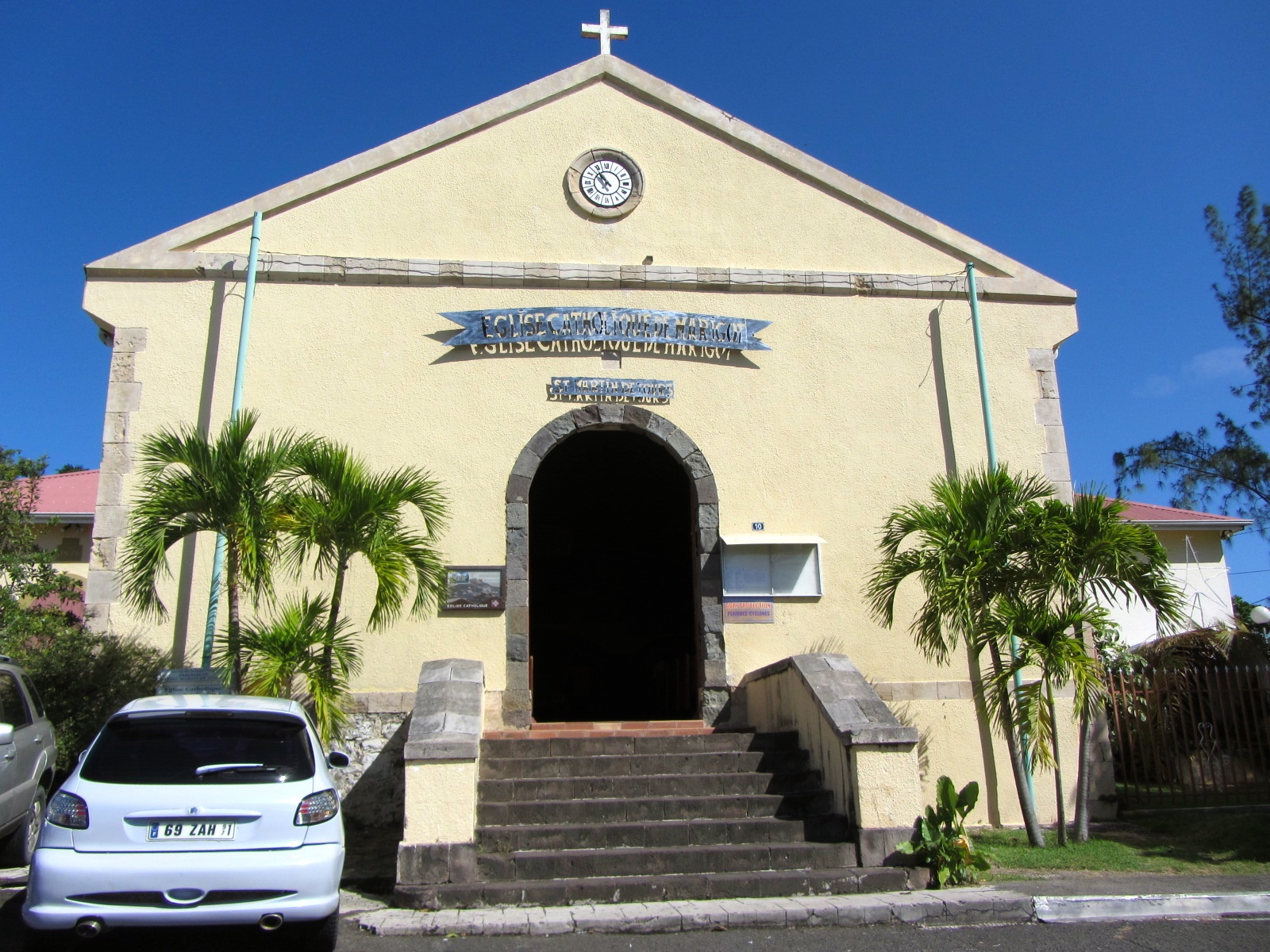
- St. Martin of Tours' Church
- 18.0693°N 63.0841°W
- Location: Marigot; Saint Martin
- Country: France
- Denomination: Roman Catholic Church

St. Martin of Tours Church (French: Église de Saint Martin de Tours) is a Roman Catholic parish of the Diocese of Basse-Terre located on rue du Fort Louis in the city of Marigot, St. Martin in the Lesser Antilles.

The church was built in 1941. In 1971 the church was expanded and a chapel was added.

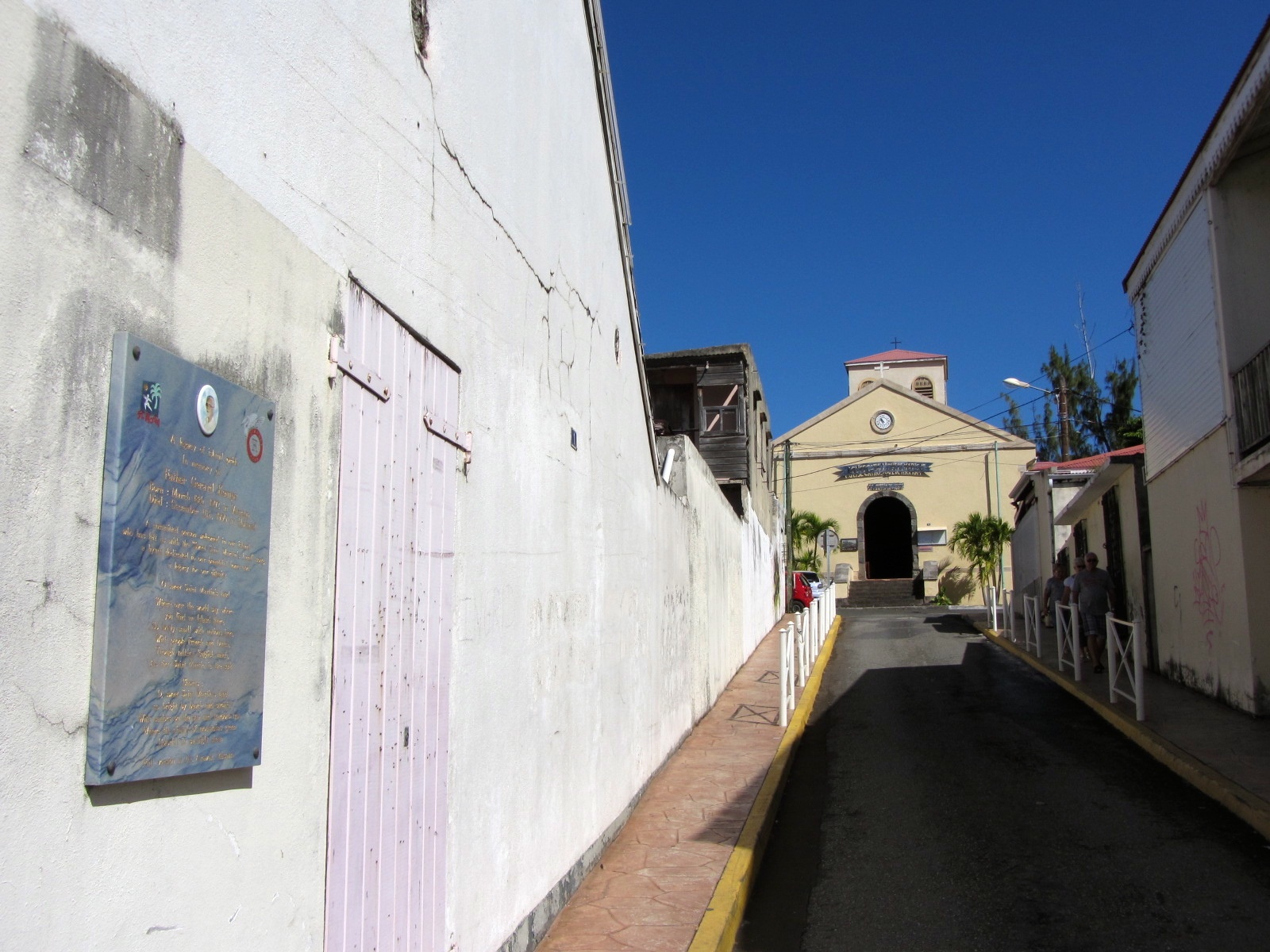
Another View

It is under the pastoral responsibility of Fr. Père Samson Doriva. As its name suggests it is dedicated to St. Martin of Tours a Catholic bishop of Tours in France elevated to the status of saint by the Holy See.

== See also ==
- Catholic Church in France
- Saint Martin
