= Daimbert =

Daimbert is a given name. Notable people with the name include:

- Dagobert of Pisa, archbishop of Pisa and Latin patriarch of Jerusalem (died 1105)
- Daimbert (archbishop of Sens), bishop from 1098 to 1122
