= List of historical capitals of Norway =

A list of the historical capitals of the Kingdom of Norway. According to the Great Norwegian Encyclopedia, "the kingdom had too few centralizing institutions to have any real "capital" in the early Middle Ages".

== List ==
Original city name	Standardization	Current city name	From	To	Historical states	Notes
Ǫgvaldsnes (Nominally)	—N/a	Avaldsnes	872	997	Kingdom of Norway (1)	Unified from the petty kingdoms of Norway to a single Kingdom of Norway, which had no clear or single capital. However, it's believed that Norway's oldest royal residence and seat of power was at the Avaldsnes Kongsgård estate.
Niðaróss	Nidaros	Trondheim (1)	997	1016	Kingdom of Norway (1)	Founded by Olav Tryggvason.
Borg	Ditto	Sarpsborg	1016	1028	Kingdom of Norway (1)	Founded by St. Olaf in 1016.
Niðaróss	Nidaros	Trondheim (2)	1028	1067	Kingdom of Norway (1)	The capital was moved to Bergen. Seat of power was originally at Alrekstad Kongsgård estate. Moved to Holmen in 1110 c.
Biorgvin	Bjørgvin	Bergen (1)	1067	1123	Kingdom of Norway (1)	The capital was moved to Konghelle.
Konungahella	Konghelle	Kungahälla (in Swedish)	1123	1150 c.	Kingdom of Norway (1)	Sigurd the Crusader royal residence after his return from Byzantium.
Niðaróss	Nidaros	Trondheim (3)	1150	1217	Kingdom of Norway (1)	The capital was moved to Trondheim for the last time
Biorgvin	Bjørgvin	Bergen (2)	1217	1299	Kingdom of Norway (1)	The capital was moved to Oslo.
Ósló	Oslo	Oslo (1)	1299	1537	Kingdom of Norway (1)	The dean at St. Mary's Church became realm chancellor.
Ósló	Oslo	Oslo (1)	1299	1537	Kalmar Union (United Kingdoms of Denmark-Norway-Sweden)	The dean at St. Mary's Church became realm chancellor.
Ósló	Oslo	Oslo (1)	1299	1537	United Kingdoms of Denmark–Norway	The dean at St. Mary's Church became realm chancellor.
København (Denmark)	Ditto	Copenhagen (in English)	1537	1814	Kingdom of Denmark–Norway	The Norwegian Council of the Realm was abolished, and the national board of directors subject to the Danish Council of the Realm in Denmark.
Christiania (Before 1877); Kristiania (1877-1924); Oslo (From 1924)	Kristiania	Oslo (2)	1814	Current	Kingdom of Norway (2)	Norway became its own state again, in a union with Sweden, and fully separate in 1905.
Christiania (Before 1877); Kristiania (1877-1924); Oslo (From 1924)	Ditto	Oslo (2)	1814	Current	United Kingdoms of Sweden-Norway	Norway became its own state again, in a union with Sweden, and fully separate in 1905.
Christiania (Before 1877); Kristiania (1877-1924); Oslo (From 1924)	Ditto	Oslo (2)	1814	Current	Kingdom of Norway (3)	Norway became its own state again, in a union with Sweden, and fully separate in 1905.

== See also ==
- History of Norway
- List of former national capitals in Northern Europe
