= Marigot, Saint Martin =

Largest city in the Collectivity of Saint Martin

Marigot
- Capital city
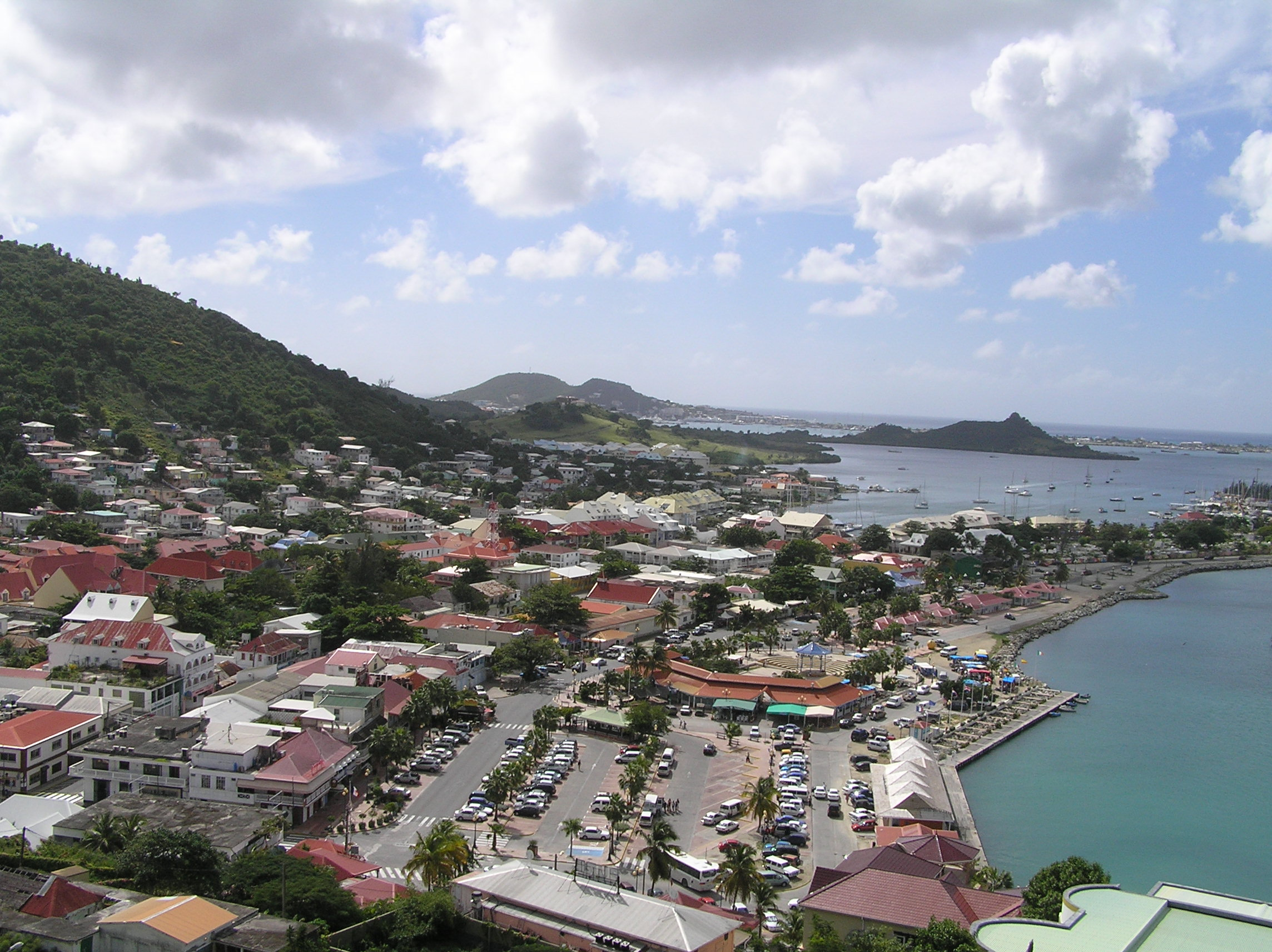
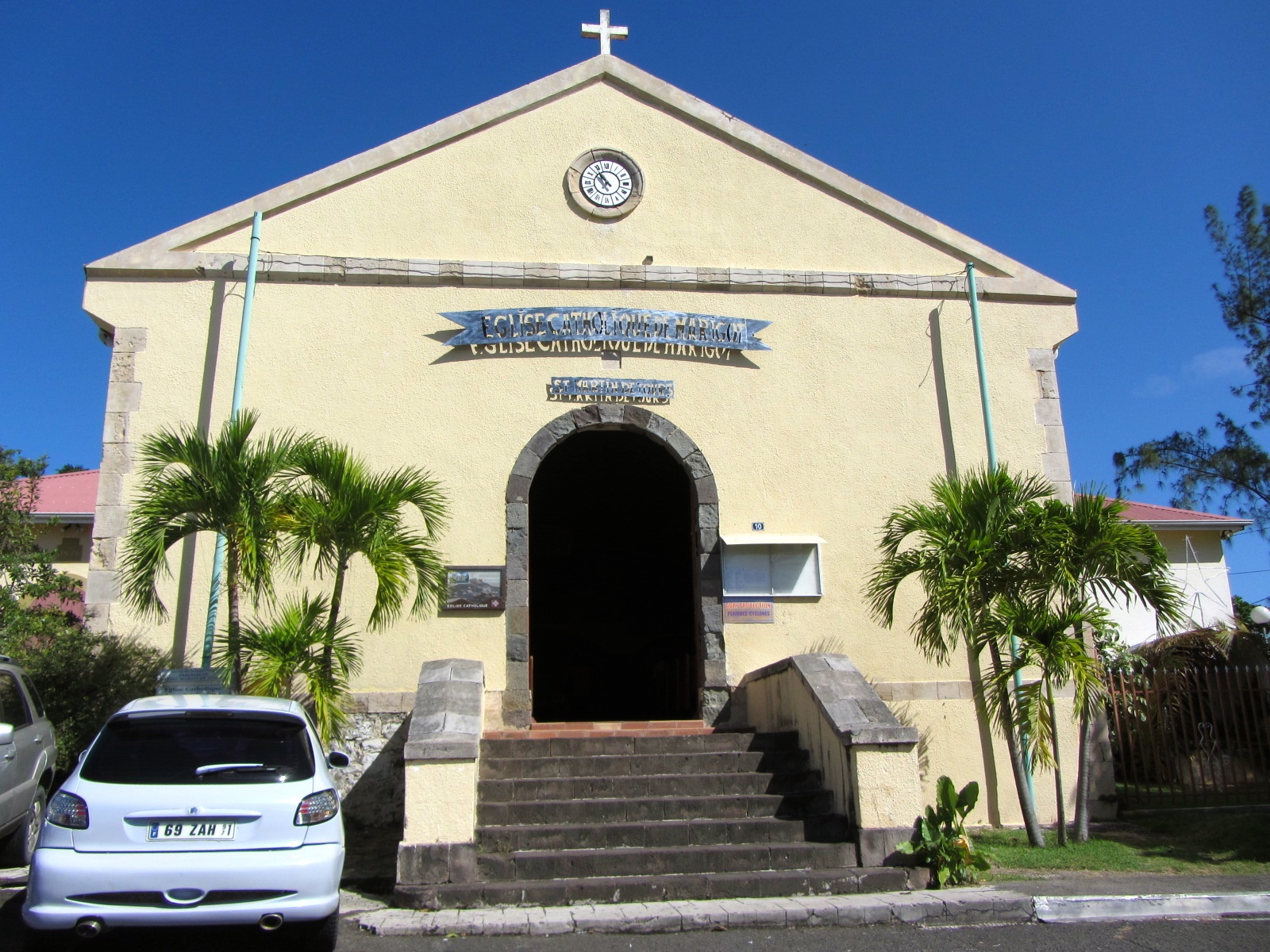
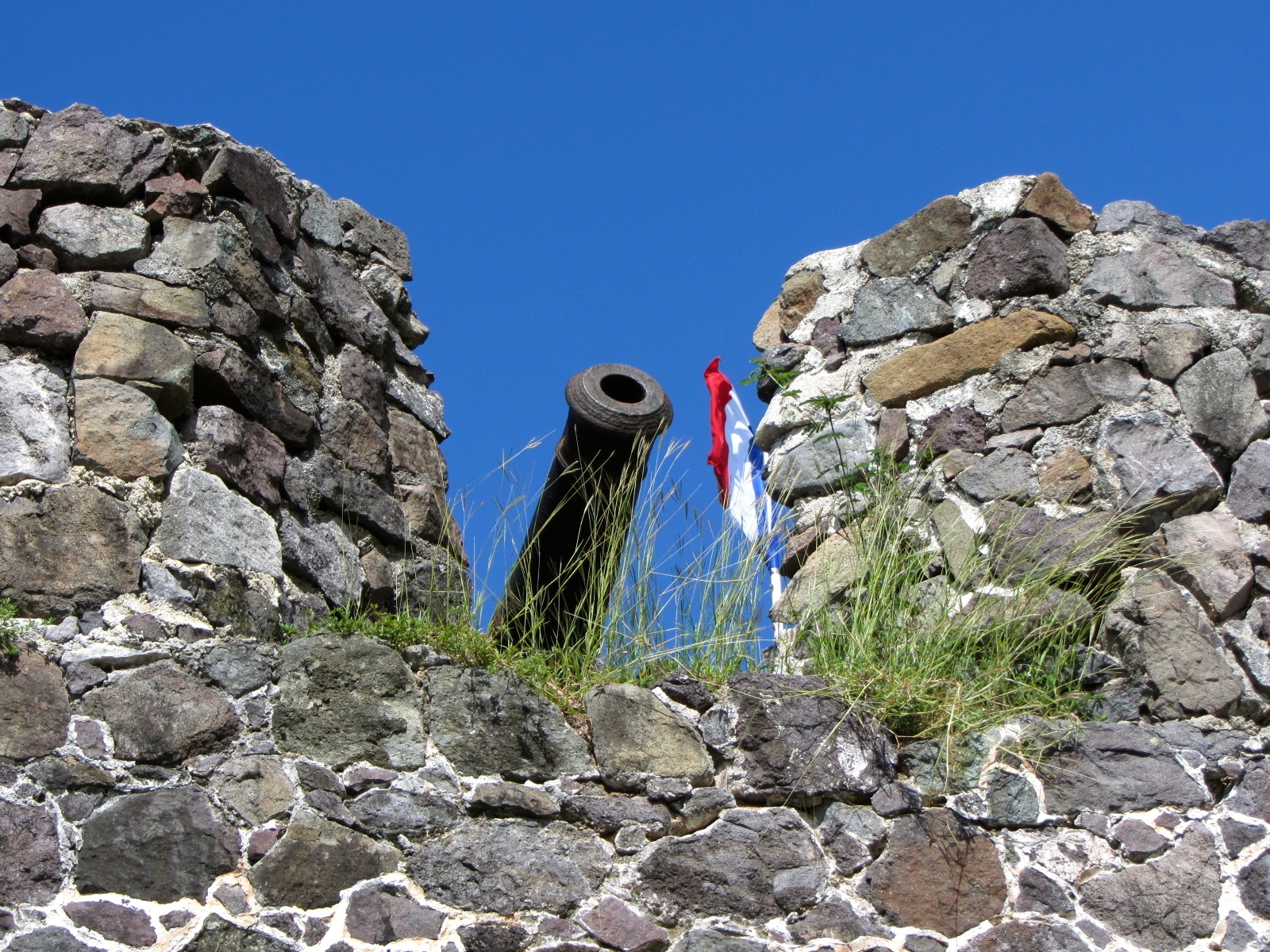
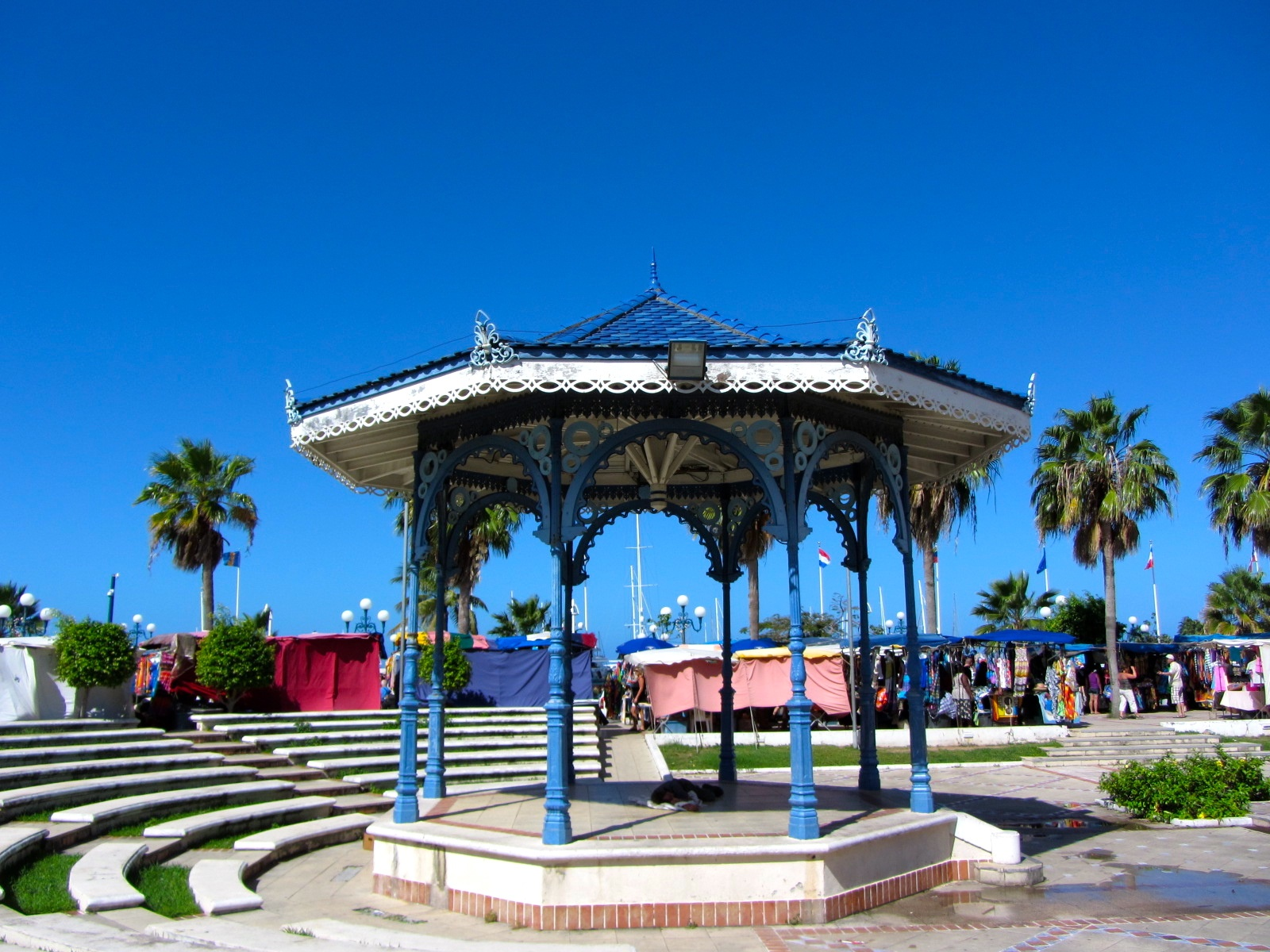
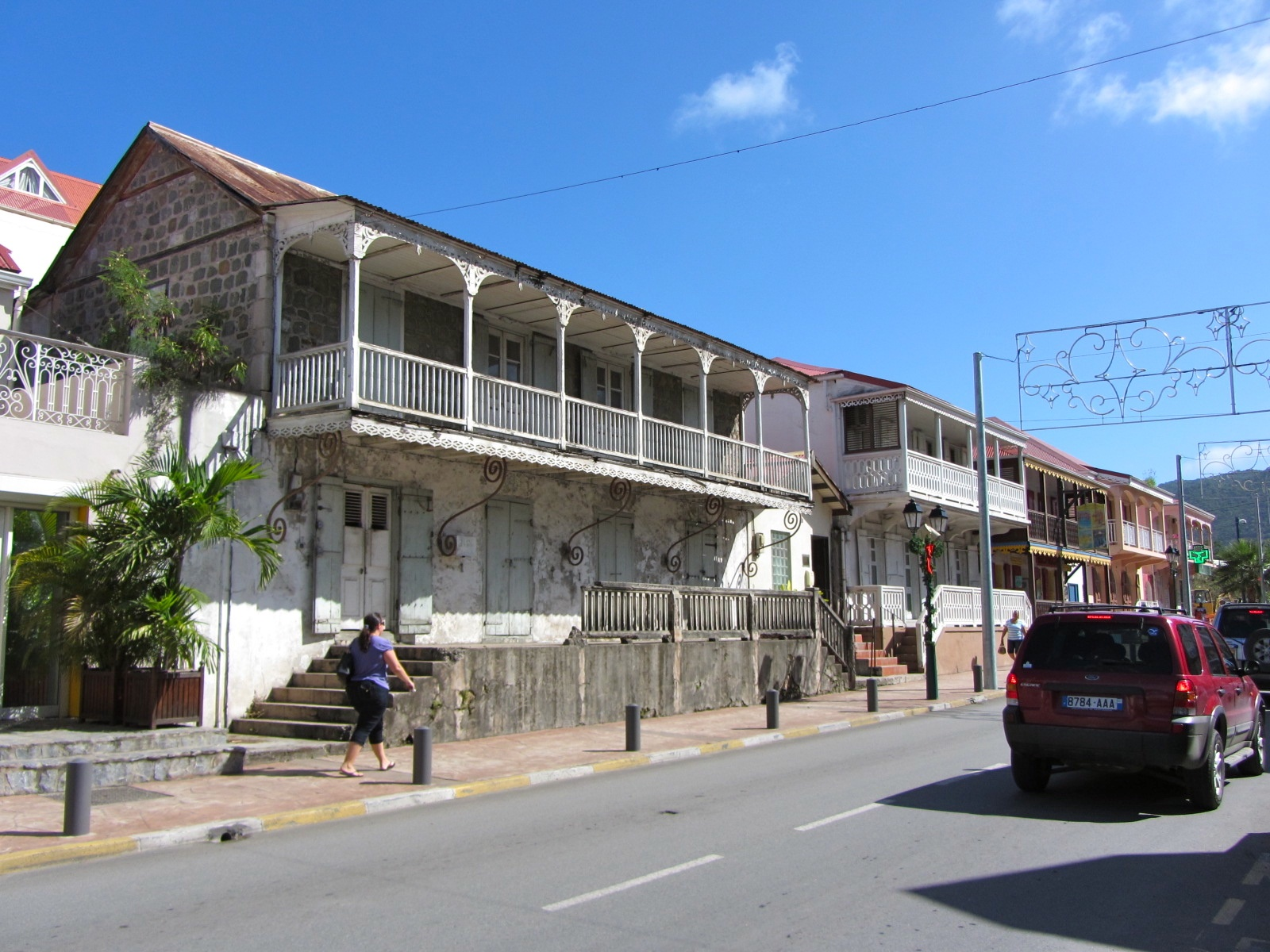
- Top: Aerial view of Marigot; Middle: Church of St. Martin of Tours, Fort Louis; Bottom:Marigot Main Plaza, Historic Rue de la Concordia

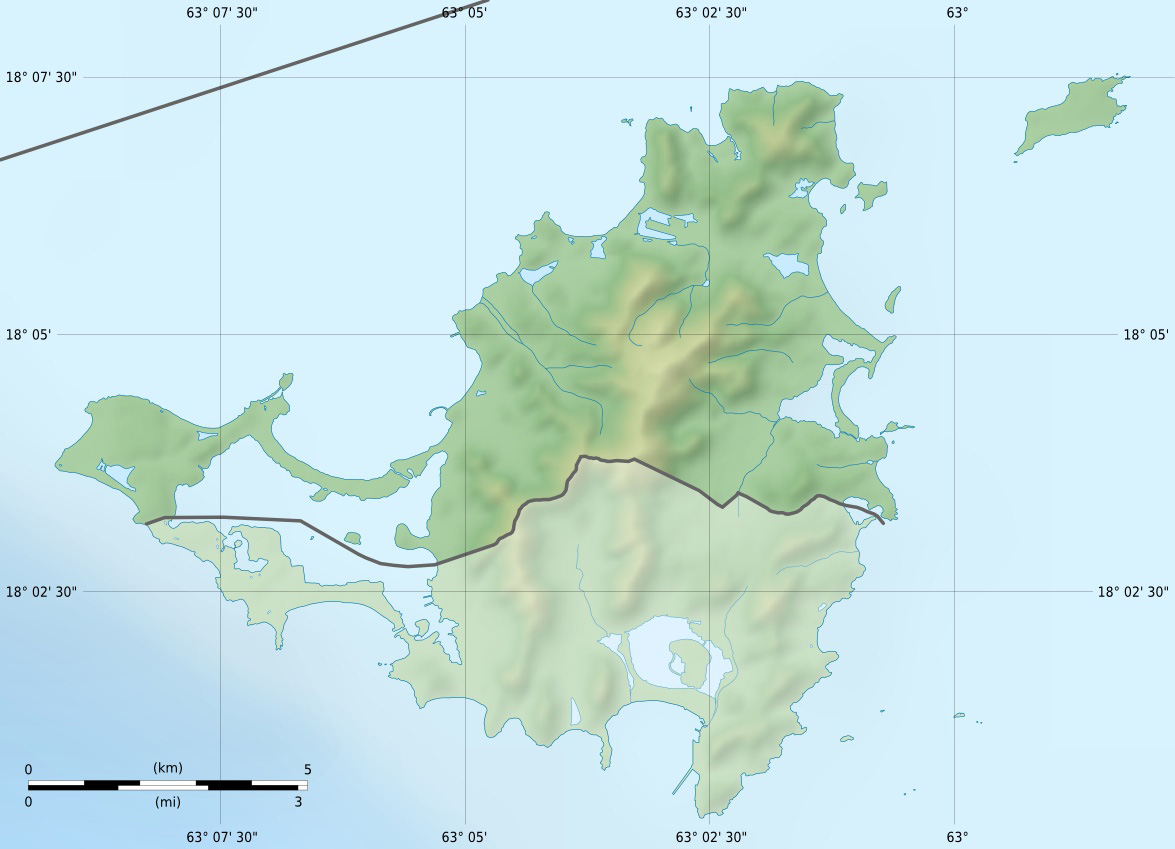
- Location within Saint-Martin Location within North America
- Coordinates: 18.0731°N 63.0822°W
- Country: France
- Overseas collectivity: Saint Martin

Government
  - Mayor: Joseph Péraste

Population (2022)
  - Total: 2,911
- Time zone: UTC−4 (AST)

Marigot (French pronunciation: [maʁiɡo]) is the main town and capital in the French Collectivity of Saint Martin. The area has been inhabited since the 17th century and fortifications were erected in 1789. The population has been in decline for decades.

== History ==
Marigot Lighthouse
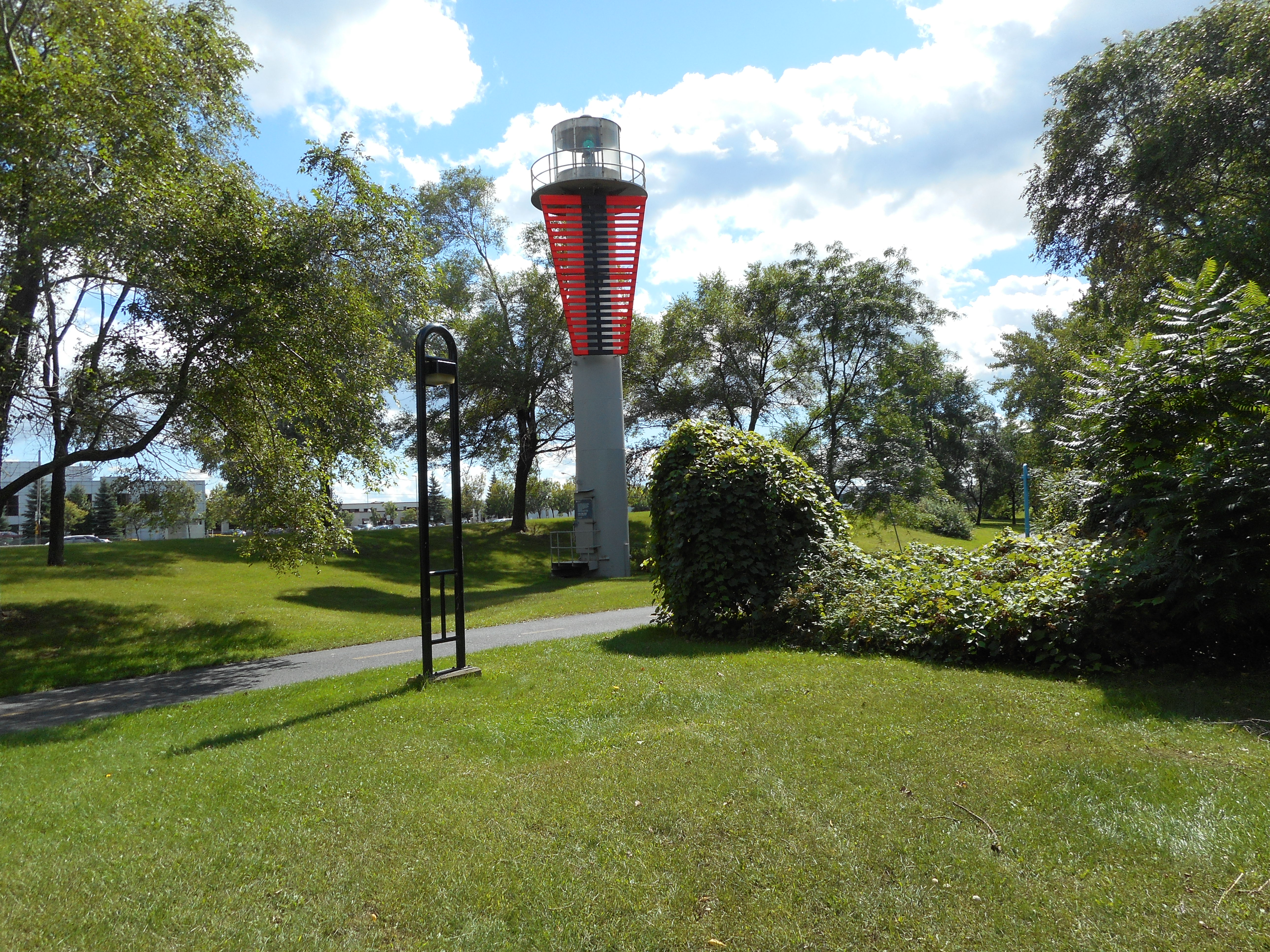
- Location: Marigot, Collectivity of Saint Martin, France
- Coordinates: 18°04′16″N 63°05′12″W

Tower
- Constructed: est. 1886
- Foundation: concrete base
- Construction: masonry tower
- Height: 10 m (33 ft)
- Shape: cylindrical frustum tower with light
- Markings: White
- Power source: solar power

Light
- Focal height: 20 m (66 ft)
- Range: 11 nmi (20 km; 13 mi) (white), 7 nmi (13 km; 8.1 mi) (red), 7 nmi (13 km; 8.1 mi) (green)
- Characteristic: Fl WRG 4s

In the 17th century the area that is now Marigot was the village of Quartier d'Orléans. The name Marigot is derived from the surrounding marshes. Fort Louis was constructed in 1789, in order to defend the warehouses in the port. A prison was built in 1789, and used until it was converted into a fire station in 1968.

In 1840, a church was constructed in Marigot and had 800-900 parishioners, with over 500 being slaves. The St. Martin of Tours' Church on rue du Fort Louis was built in 1941.

The town was electrified in 1963, and a seawater desalination unit was installed in 1965.

== Government ==
Albert Fleming-Romney served as mayor of Marigot from 1983 to 2007. Joseph Péraste has been the mayor of Marigot since 2014.

== Demographics ==
John Hodge, an Anguillan who converted to Methodism, came to Marigot in 1817. He wanted to found a church, but congregation laws prevented him. He moved to Cole Bay where he preached under a tree and eventually a majority of the slaves on the island were Methodist by 1850. Jehovah's Witnesses became active in Marigot in 1945.

In 1999, the three largest groups for Marigot's foreign population were 83 Chinese people, 25 South Africans, and 14 Austrians and Irish. The population of Marigot declined from 3,700 in 2007, to 3,568 in 2012, to 3,196 in 2017, and 2,911 in 2022.

As of 2022, the population density is 138.3 inhabitants per km2. There are 1,436 households and 1,324 of these households pay taxes. The median disposable income is €17,640 and 33% of the town is below the poverty line. 704 people are employed while the unemployment rate for people between 15 and 64 is 23.6%.

== Geography ==
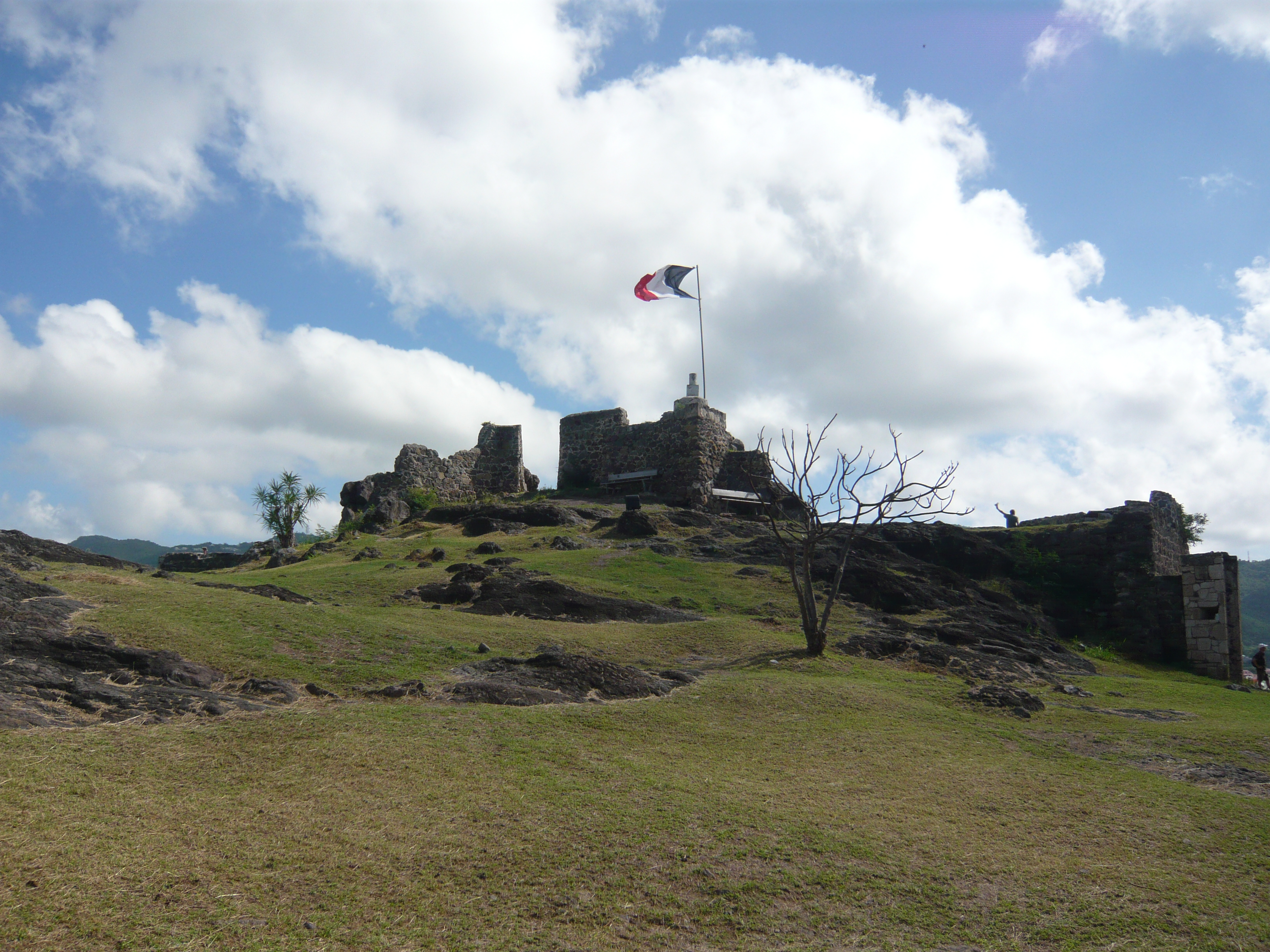
Fort St. Louis, 2010

Climate data for Saint Martin (Princess Juliana International Airport) (1991–2020 normals, extremes 1971–2020)
| Month | Jan | Feb | Mar | Apr | May | Jun | Jul | Aug | Sep | Oct | Nov | Dec | Year |
|---|---|---|---|---|---|---|---|---|---|---|---|---|---|
| Record high °C (°F) | 32.7 (90.9) | 31.6 (88.9) | 32.6 (90.7) | 33.6 (92.5) | 34.0 (93.2) | 35.2 (95.4) | 34.2 (93.6) | 35.1 (95.2) | 35.0 (95.0) | 34.3 (93.7) | 33.9 (93.0) | 32.1 (89.8) | 35.2 (95.4) |
| Mean daily maximum °C (°F) | 28.6 (83.5) | 28.7 (83.7) | 29.0 (84.2) | 29.6 (85.3) | 30.4 (86.7) | 31.3 (88.3) | 31.5 (88.7) | 31.8 (89.2) | 31.7 (89.1) | 31.2 (88.2) | 30.3 (86.5) | 29.3 (84.7) | 30.3 (86.5) |
| Daily mean °C (°F) | 25.7 (78.3) | 25.6 (78.1) | 25.8 (78.4) | 26.6 (79.9) | 27.5 (81.5) | 28.4 (83.1) | 28.6 (83.5) | 28.8 (83.8) | 28.8 (83.8) | 28.3 (82.9) | 27.4 (81.3) | 26.4 (79.5) | 27.3 (81.1) |
| Mean daily minimum °C (°F) | 23.3 (73.9) | 23.2 (73.8) | 23.5 (74.3) | 24.2 (75.6) | 25.3 (77.5) | 26.2 (79.2) | 26.3 (79.3) | 26.5 (79.7) | 26.4 (79.5) | 25.9 (78.6) | 25.1 (77.2) | 24.1 (75.4) | 25.0 (77.0) |
| Record low °C (°F) | 18.6 (65.5) | 18.8 (65.8) | 19.1 (66.4) | 19.3 (66.7) | 20.2 (68.4) | 21.8 (71.2) | 22.1 (71.8) | 21.4 (70.5) | 22.0 (71.6) | 21.8 (71.2) | 20.8 (69.4) | 19.9 (67.8) | 18.6 (65.5) |
| Average precipitation mm (inches) | 67.9 (2.67) | 49.4 (1.94) | 46.9 (1.85) | 60.1 (2.37) | 98.0 (3.86) | 55.0 (2.17) | 96.6 (3.80) | 106.2 (4.18) | 116.1 (4.57) | 157.0 (6.18) | 162.0 (6.38) | 101.0 (3.98) | 1,116.2 (43.94) |
| Average precipitation days (≥ 1 mm) | 13 | 11 | 8 | 8 | 10 | 9 | 13 | 14 | 13 | 14 | 14 | 14 | 141 |
| Average relative humidity (%) | 74.7 | 74.1 | 73.6 | 75.0 | 75.9 | 75.1 | 74.8 | 75.4 | 76.3 | 76.8 | 77.4 | 76.6 | 75.5 |
| Mean monthly sunshine hours | 258.1 | 245.2 | 274.8 | 269.9 | 253.7 | 245.8 | 259.1 | 267.5 | 245.1 | 249.2 | 238.4 | 247.1 | 3,053.9 |
Source 1: National Oceanic and Atmospheric Administration
Source 2: Meteorological Department Curaçao (humidity 1971–2000)

== Notable people ==
- François Perrinon, French abolitionist

== See also ==
- List of lighthouses in the Collectivity of Saint Martin
- San Martin shopping

== Works cited ==
=== Books ===
- Ross, Kenneth; Bidegain, Ana; Johnson, Todd, eds. (2022). Christianity in Latin America and the Caribbean. Edinburgh University Press. ISBN 9781474492140.
- Taylor, Patrick; Case, Frederick, eds. (2013). The Encyclopedia of Caribbean Religions: Volume 1: A-L; Volume 2: M-Z. University of Illinois Press.

=== Journals ===
- Menkman, W. (1958). "St. Martin En St. Barthelemy 1911-1951: Naar Geschriften Van Pastoor De Barbanson". New West Indian Guide. 38 (3). Brill Publishers: 151–162. doi:10.2307/41969595. JSTOR 41969595.
- Redon, Marie (2007). "Migrations et frontière: le cas de Saint-Martin". Études caribéennes (8). Olivier Dehoorne: 33–51. doi:10.2307/48784667. JSTOR 48784667.

=== News ===
- "Former mayor Albert Fleming passed away". St Maarten News. 5 July 2023. Archived from the original on 12 July 2025.
- "L'octroi de mer représente pratiquement 50% du budget de la ville". France-Antilles. 23 September 2024. Archived from the original on 12 July 2025.

=== Web ===
- "Ancienne Prison Du Fort Louis". Collectivity of Saint Martin. Archived from the original on 12 July 2025.
- "Cimetiere De Marigot". Collectivity of Saint Martin. Archived from the original on 12 July 2025.
- "Comparateur de territoires". Institut national de la statistique et des études économiques. Archived from the original on 12 July 2025.
- "Marigot". Collectivity of Saint Martin. Archived from the original on 12 July 2025.
- "Populations légales 2017 Commune du Marigot (97216)". Institut national de la statistique et des études économiques. Archived from the original on 12 July 2025.
