= Czersk Lake =

Oxbow lake in Masovian Voivodeship, Poland

- Jezioro Czerskie (Polish)
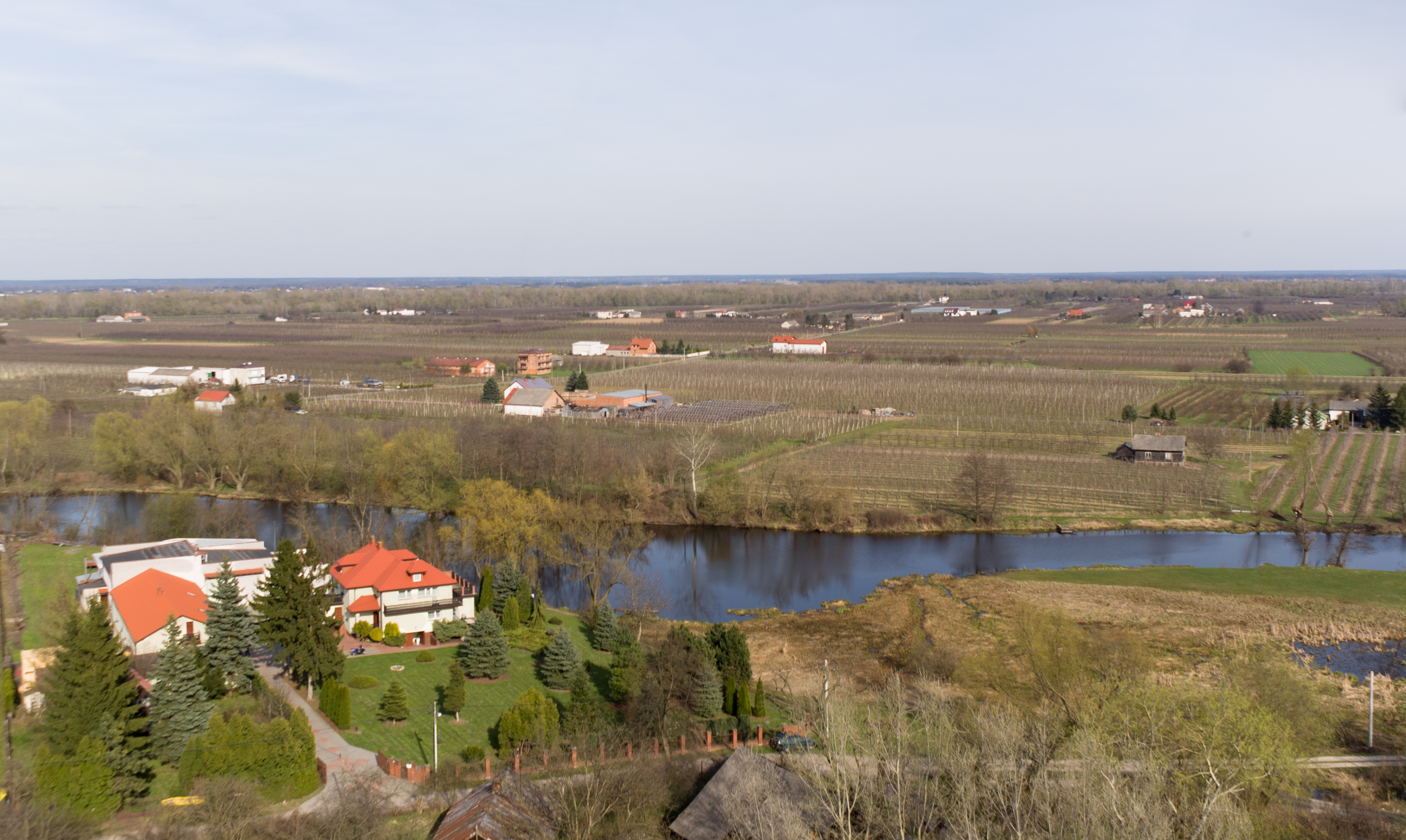
- Czersk Lake viewed from the tower of Czersk Castle

- Location in Poland
- Location: Czersk, Masovian Voivodeship, Poland
- Coordinates: 51°57′31″N 21°14′19″E
- Type: Oxbow lake
- Basin countries: Poland
- Designation: Natural monument

Czersk Lake (Polish: Jezioro Czerskie) is an oxbow lake of the Vistula in Czersk, within Gmina Góra Kalwaria, Piaseczno County, Masovian Voivodeship, Poland. It lies in the Central Mazovian Lowland at the foot of Czersk Castle.

The lake occupies a former channel of the Vistula. Together with its shoreline vegetation and adjoining wetlands, it covers approximately 9.0 ha (22 acres). It forms part of the landscape below a section of the Vistula escarpment crowned by the ruins of Czersk Castle.

Czersk Lake was designated a natural monument on 11 December 1949. Its status as a natural monument was reaffirmed in a 2025 resolution of the Góra Kalwaria Municipal Council concerning conservation work at the site.
