= Czersk, Masovian Voivodeship =

Czersk
- Settlement
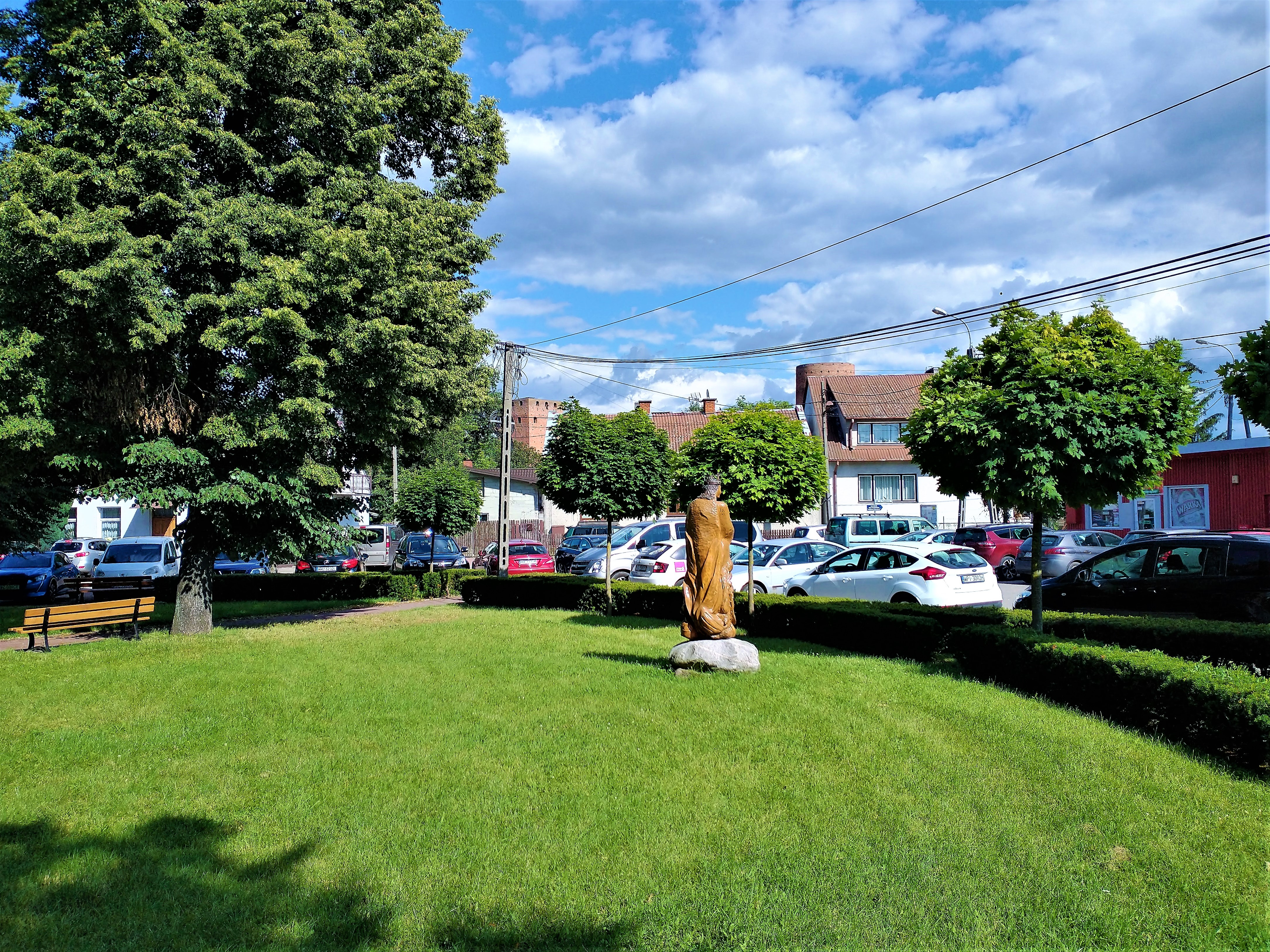
- Market Square

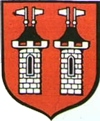
- Coat of arms

- Location within Poland
- Coordinates: 51°57′31″N 21°13′49″E
- Country: Poland
- Voivodeship: Masovian
- County: Piaseczno
- Gmina: Góra Kalwaria
- granting city rights: 1350
- deprivation of city rights: 1870

Population (approx.)
  - Total: 590
- Time zone: UTC+1 (CET)
  - Summer (DST): UTC+2 (CEST)
- Vehicle registration: WPI

Czersk (Polish pronunciation: [t͡ʂɛrsk]) is a settlement in the administrative district of Gmina Góra Kalwaria, within Piaseczno County, Masovian Voivodeship, in east-central Poland. The village also lies on the Czersk Lake (size: 9 hectares), which is an oxbow lake of the Vistula.

Czersk was an important settlement in the past and is one of the oldest Mazovian cities, famous for ruins of a medieval castle constructed in the late 14th century. It was a royal town of the Crown of the Kingdom of Poland in the past. In 1247–1526, it was the capital of the Duchy of Czersk, one of medieval Polish duchies. After incorporation of Mazovia into Poland (1526), the duchy was turned into the Czersk Land (see ziemia), part of Masovian Voivodeship (1526–1795). The Land of Czersk was divided into four counties - those of Czersk, Grójec, Garwolin (since 1539), and Warka. Czersk itself was the seat of castellans, who also were senators of the Polish–Lithuanian Commonwealth.

== Name ==
Czersk was first mentioned in the Laurentian Codex, in which under the date 1142, it is spelled as Чьрньскъ (Čьrnьsk, Cz(i)rn(i)sk). In Polish-language sources, it was spelled Cirnsk (1236-1237), Cyrnsko (1242), Czyersko (1456), and later, Czyrnsk or Czyrnsko. These forms were later simplified into Czyrsko, which in late Middle Ages changed into Czersk. The name probably comes from the Czarna river, a tributary to the Vistula River.

== History ==
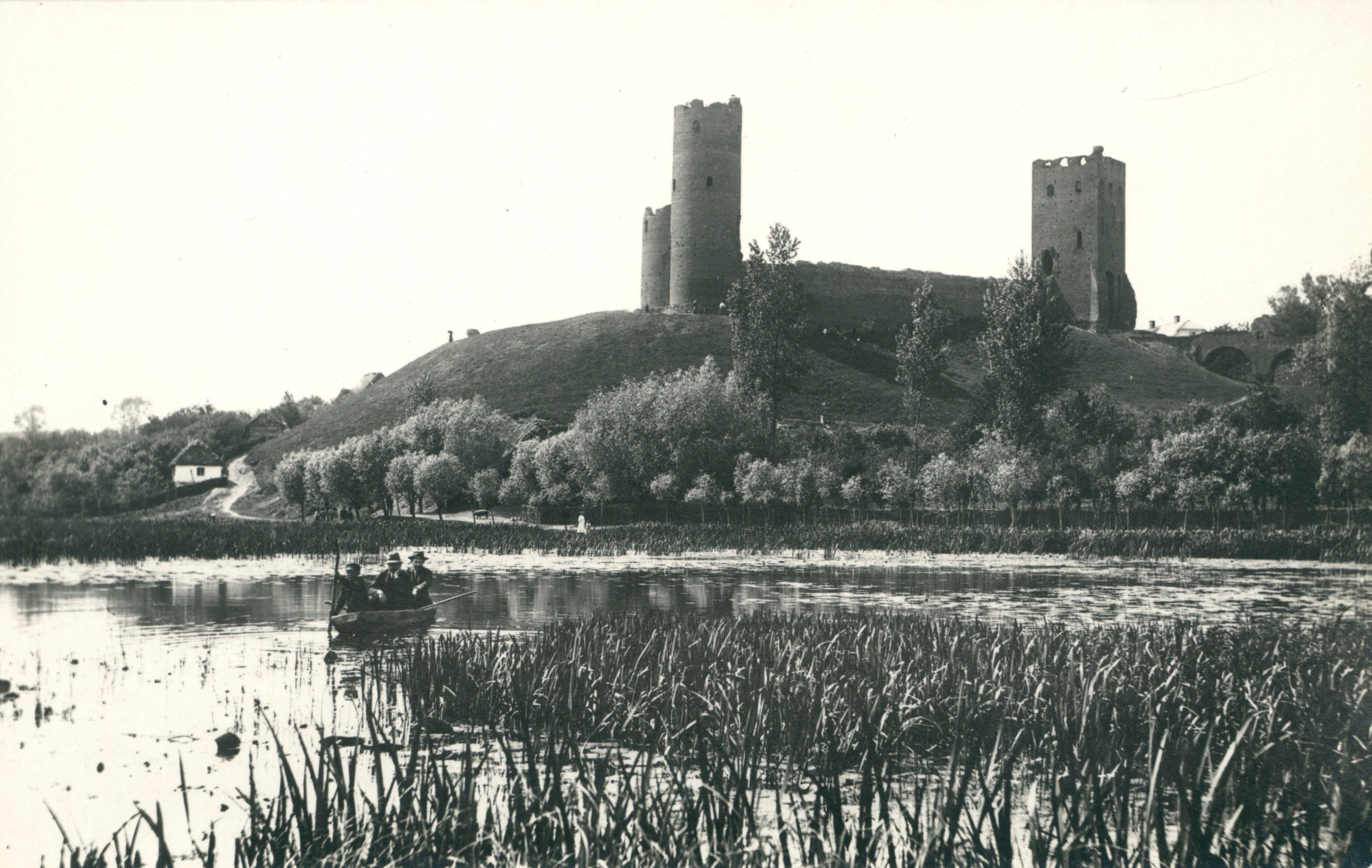
Czersk Castle in the interbellum

First Slavic gord was established on a local hill in the 11th century, in a location of a 7th-century settlement, near a Vistula river ford. In the 12th century, Czersk became the seat of a castellan, and in 1252, of a Roman Catholic archdeacon, subjected to the Bishop of Poznań, which turned the town into an important political center of Mazovia. In the same year, Czersk was named a capital of a Mazovian duchy.

Officially, Czersk received town charter in 1350, but long before that time, it had an urban character, with a mid-13th century market square. In 1388, Duke of Mazovia Janusz I of Warsaw ordered construction of a Gothic castle with two towers and a tower gate. The castle was completed in 1410. Three years later, the capital of the duchy was moved to better located Warsaw, and Czersk began a slow decline. Furthermore, in the 14th century the Vistula river bed moved eastwards, and the town found itself located a few kilometers away from the strategic river.

During the reign of King Czersk Sigismund I the Old, Czersk became one of favourite places of his wife, Queen Bona Sforza. She spent a lot of time here, and on her initiative, Czersk returned as one of main centers of the region. A brewery was opened, trade flourished, local produce was very popular across Mazovia. The town prospered until the Swedish invasion of Poland, when, after the Battle of Warka (1656), Czersk, together with the castle, was completely destroyed by the retreating Swedish units. The town never recovered from the destruction; in 1762-1766 Crown Marshall Franciszek Bieliński tried to rebuild the castle, but his project was not completed due to Partitions of Poland.

In 1815, Czersk became part of Russian-controlled Congress Poland, and in 1869, as a punishment for the January Uprising, Czersk was stripped of its town rights, becoming a village. Once one of the largest medieval towns of Poland, and second largest town of Mazovia (after Płock), Czersk now is a small village, with population less than 1,000. Czersk still has a medieval grid plan, with a large market square in the middle.

== Czersk Castle ==
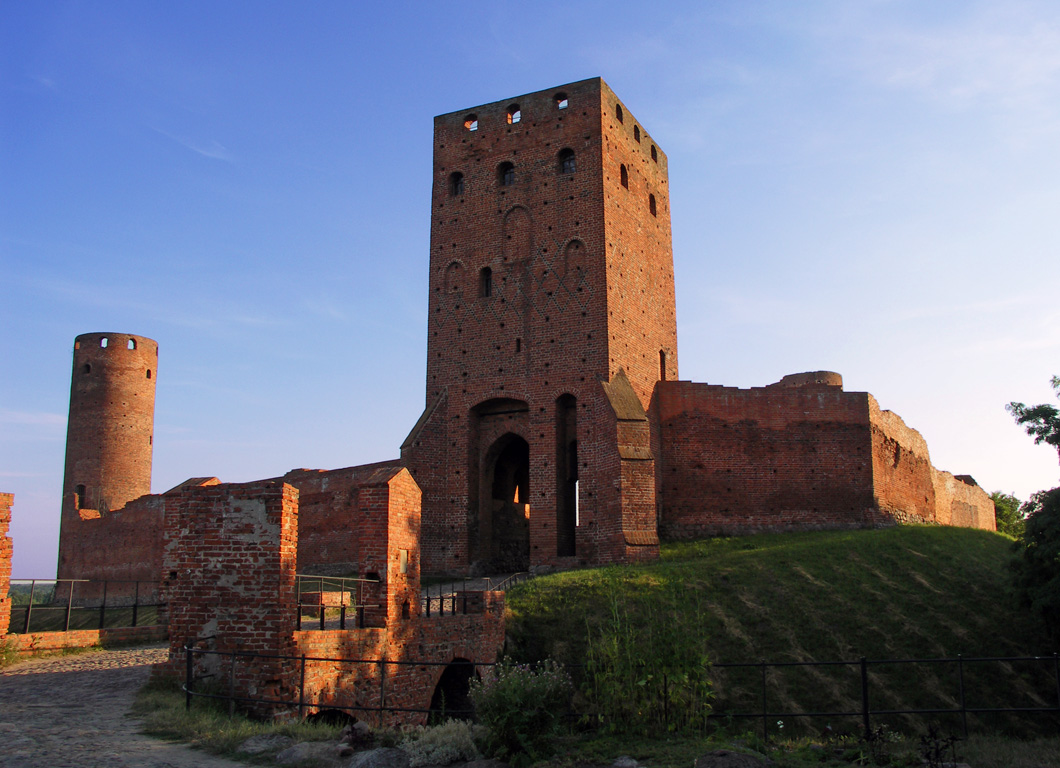
Image of Czersk Castle just before entrance bridge

In the 11th century, during the reign of either Bolesław III Wrymouth or Władysław I Herman, a wooden gord existed in the location of the castle. The gord later became administrative center of the Duchy of Czersk, mentioned in 1224 in the documents of Castellan of Czersk, Piotr Pilch. In 1229, Duke Konrad I of Masovia imprisoned here Duke Henry I the Bearded, who was kept in the castle's dungeon. In 1239, Konrad imprisoned here another Duke, Bolesław V the Chaste.

In 1350, the gord was partly destroyed in a Lithuanian raid, and in 1388, Duke of Mazovia Janusz I of Warsaw ordered construction of a Gothic castle with two towers and a tower gate. The castle became one of main residences of Janusz I; it was here that he died on December 8, 1429.

In 1526, Mazovia was incorporated into the Crown of the Kingdom of Poland, and the Czersk Castle became a royal property. In 1547, it was administered by Queen Bona Sforza, who in 1549 built here a residence, called Wielki Dom. The castle was almost completely destroyed in 1656, during the Swedish invasion of Poland. In 1762–1766, the Starosta of Czersk and Crown Marshall tried to rebuild the complex, as he planned to place here archives and local court. His plans failed due to the Partitions of Poland, and the castle now is a permanent ruin. It is open to visitors, who admire the preserved walls and three towers. Inside the complex, there are foundations of St. Peter church.
