= Mazovia =

Historical region in mid-northeastern Poland

Mazovia Mazowsze
- Historical region
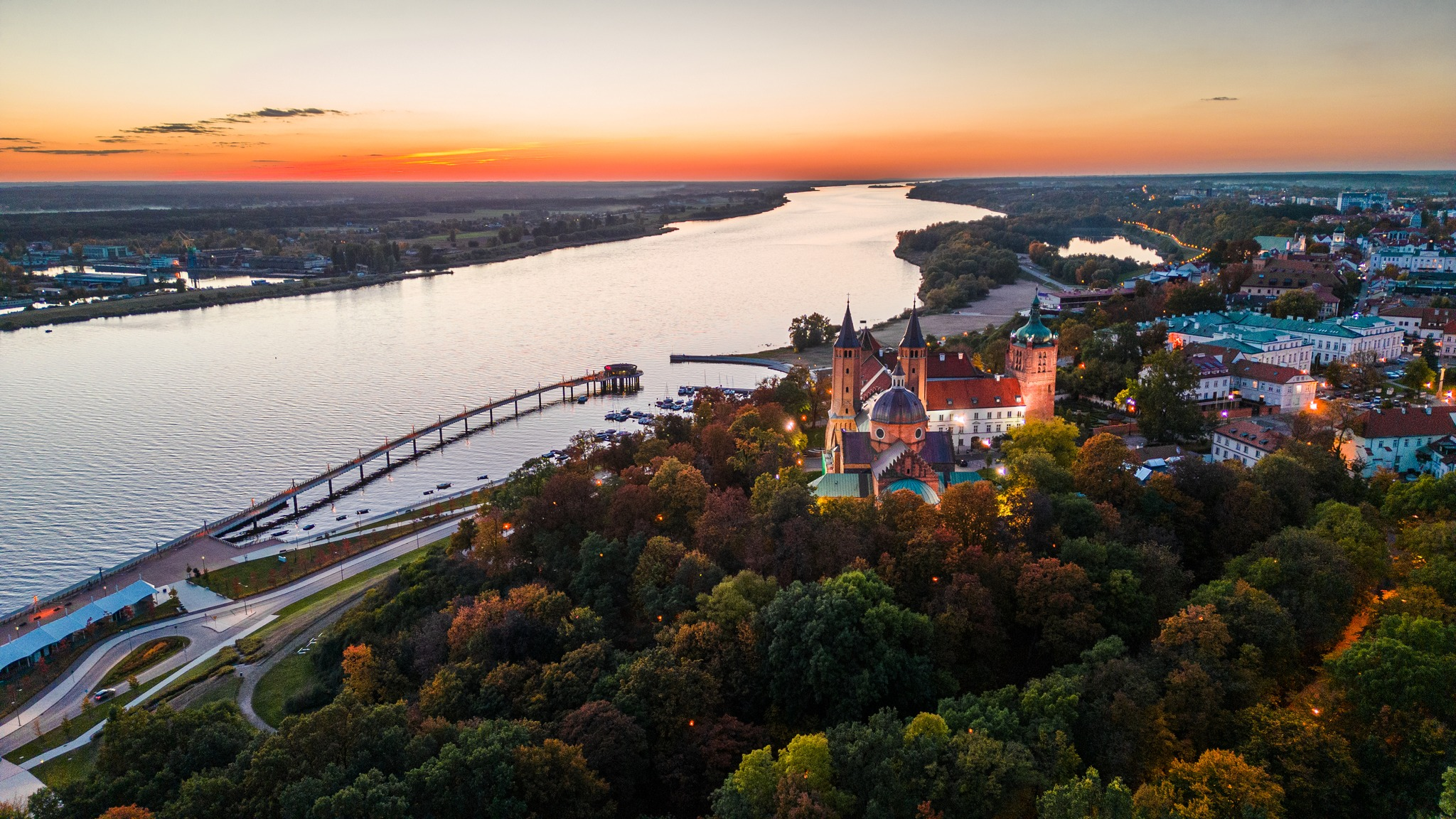
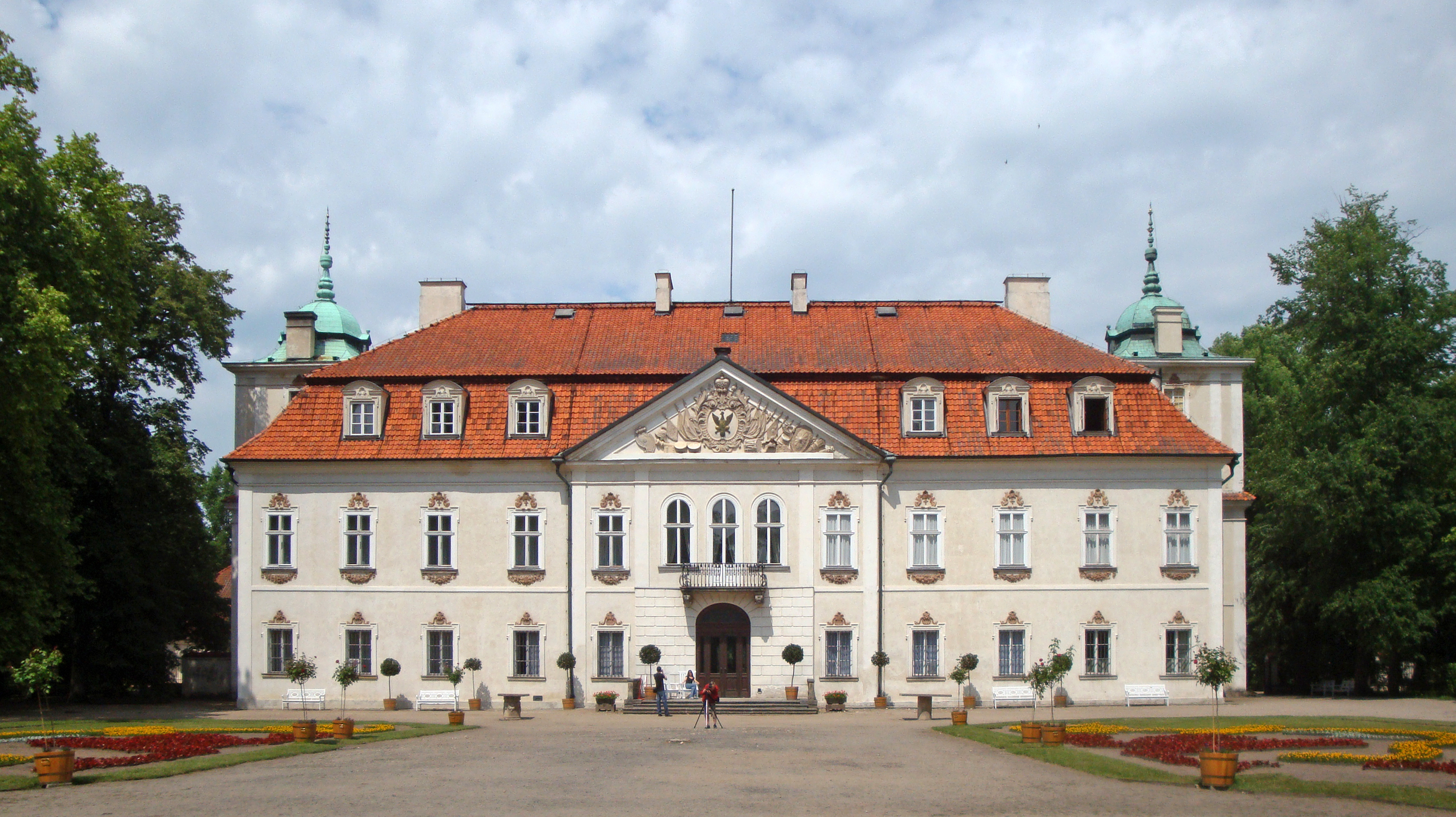
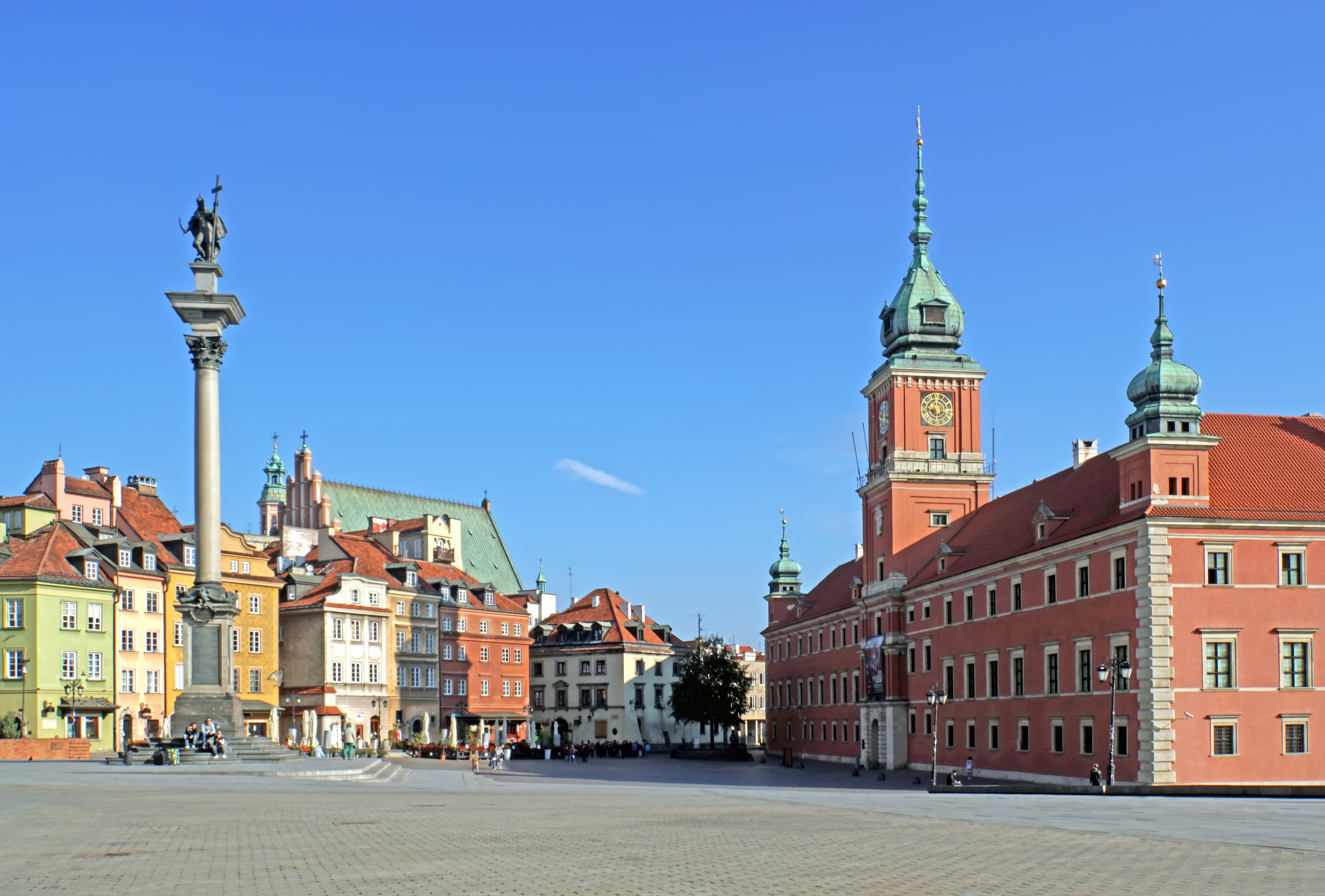
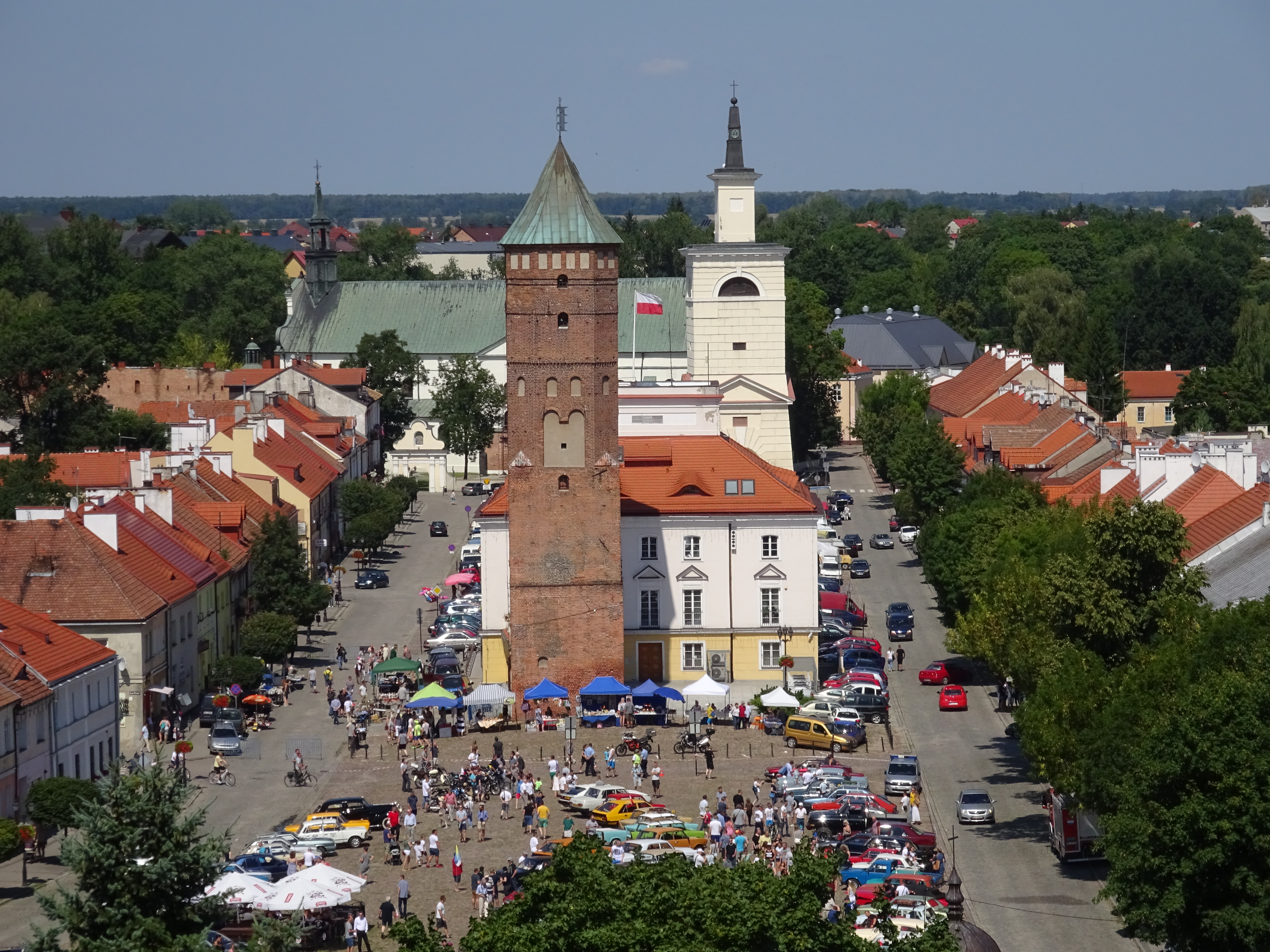
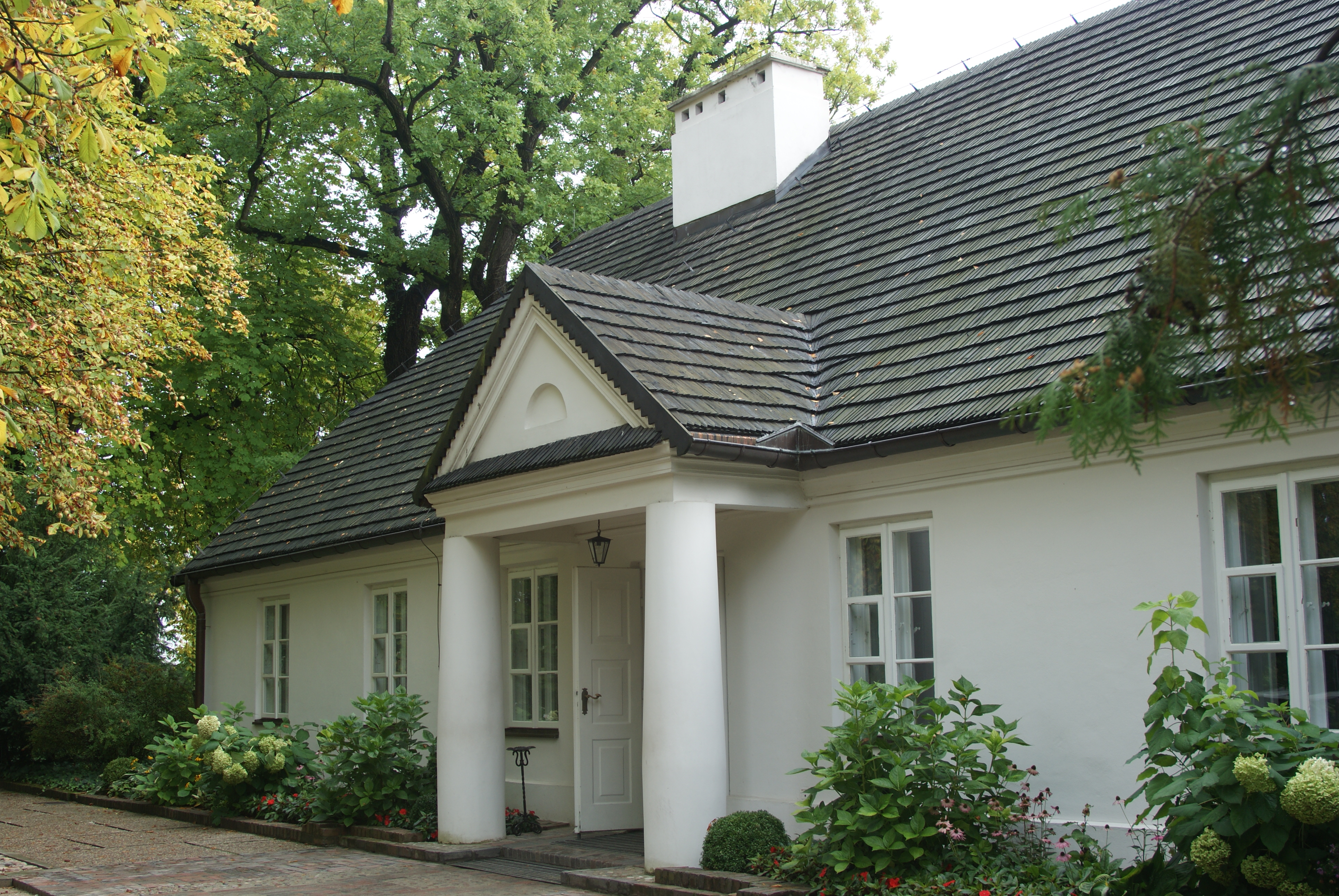
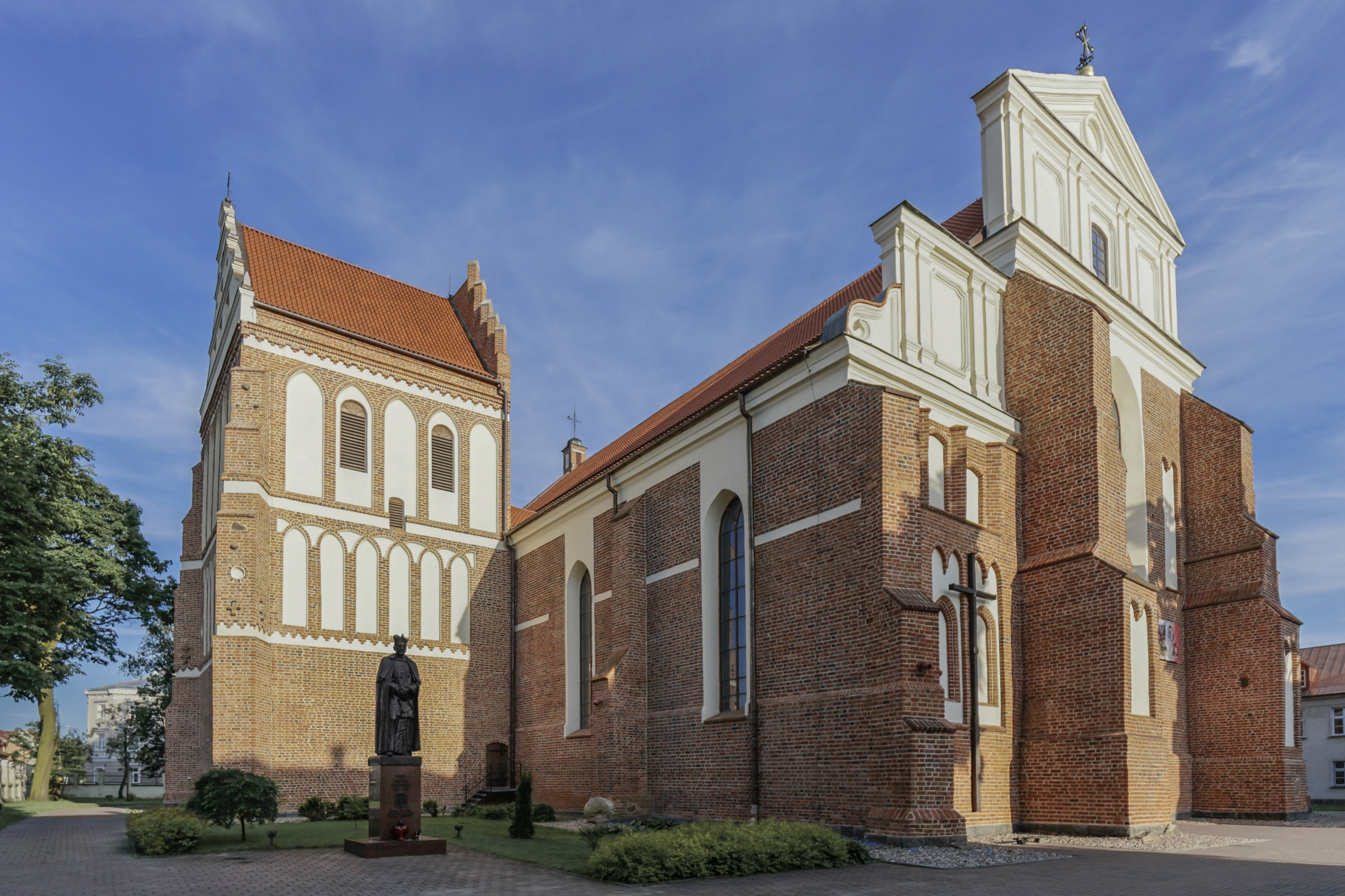
- Płock Old Town Nieborów Palace Castle Square in Warsaw Market Square in Pułtusk Birthplace of Frédéric Chopin in Żelazowa Wola Cathedral in Łomża

- Coat of arms

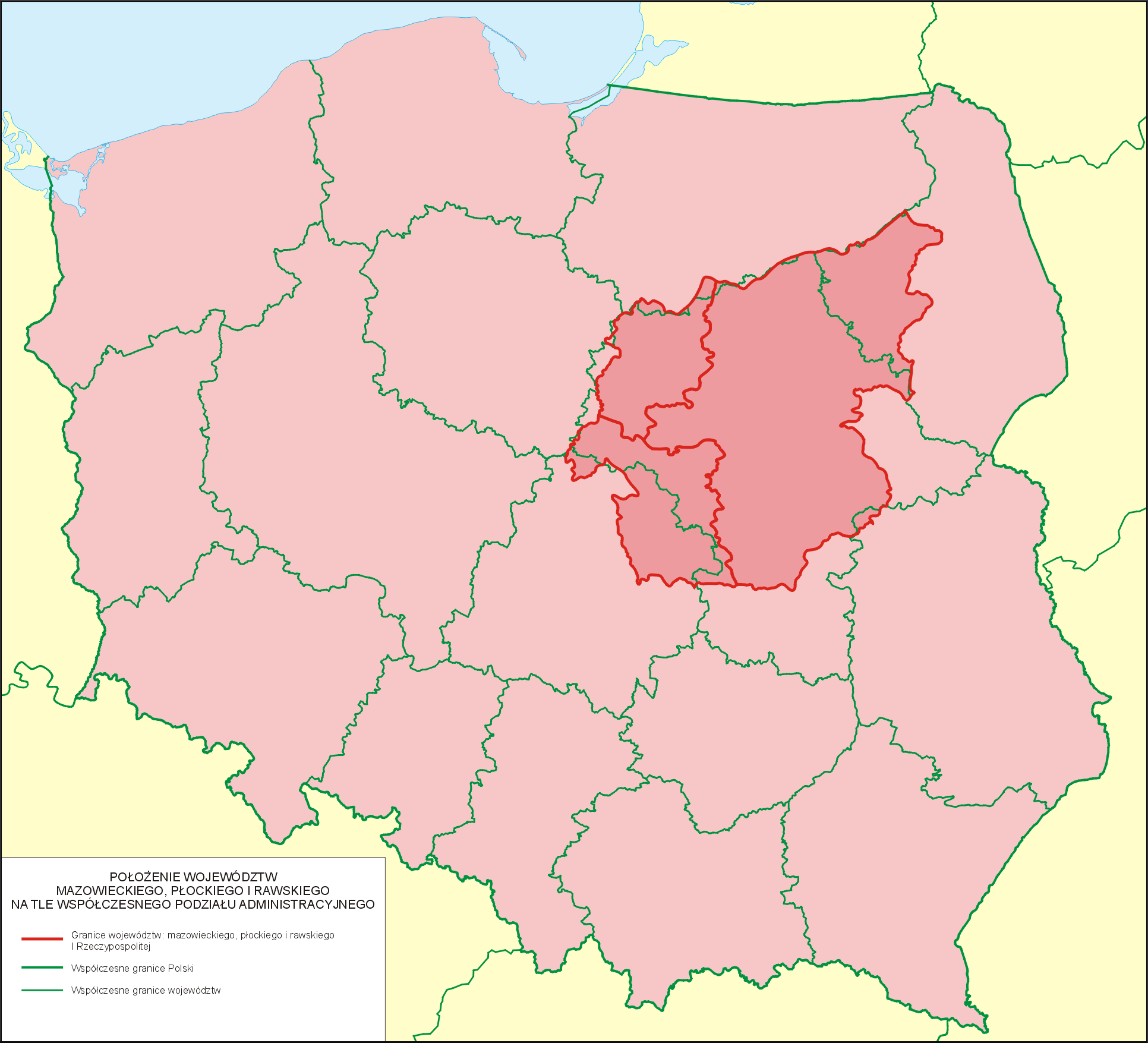
- Three historical Mazovian voivodeships in comparison with contemporary Polish voivodeships
- Country: Poland
- Largest city: Warsaw
- Time zone: UTC+1 (CET)
  - Summer (DST): UTC+2 (CEST)
- Primary airports: Warsaw Chopin Airport; Warsaw Modlin Airport

Mazovia or Masovia (Polish: Mazowsze [maˈzɔfʂɛ]) is a historical region in mid-north-eastern Poland. It spans the North European Plain, roughly between Łódź and Białystok, with Warsaw being the largest city and Płock being the capital of the region. Throughout the centuries, Mazovia developed a separate sub-culture featuring diverse folk songs, architecture, dress and traditions different from those of other Poles.

Historical Mazovia existed from the Middle Ages until the partitions of Poland and consisted of three voivodeships with the capitals in Warsaw, Płock, and Rawa. The main city of the region was Płock, which was even the capital of Poland from 1079 to 1138; however, in Early Modern Times Płock lost its importance to Warsaw, which became the capital of Poland. From 1138, Mazovia was governed by a separate branch of the Piast dynasty. When the last ruler of the independent Duchy of Mazovia died, it was fully incorporated into the Polish Crown in 1526. During the Polish–Lithuanian Commonwealth, over 20% of the Mazovian population was categorized as petty nobility. Between 1816 and 1844, the Mazovian Governorate was established, encompassing the southern part of the region, along with Łęczyca Land and south-eastern Kuyavia. The former inhabitants of Mazovia are the Masurians, who since the Late Middle Ages settled in neighboring southern Prussia, a region later called Masuria, where they converted to Protestantism in the Reformation era, thus leaving Catholicism, to which their relatives from Mazovia still adhered.

The borders of contemporary Mazovian Voivodeship (province), which was created in 1999, do not exactly reflect the original size of Mazovia, as they do not include the historically Mazovian cities of Łomża and Łowicz, but include the historically Lesser Polish cities of Radom and Siedlce.

== Geography ==
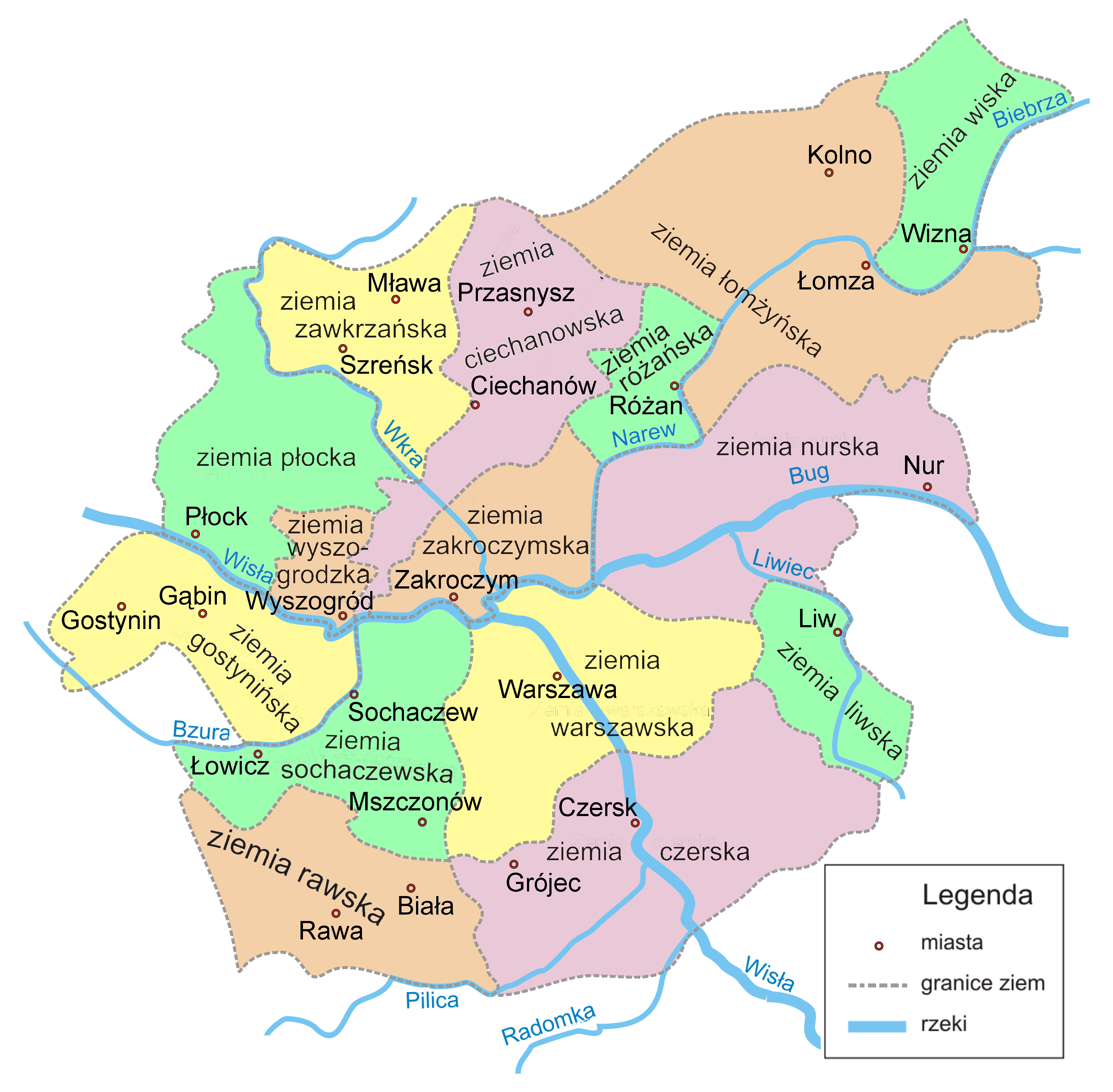
Historical lands of Mazovia

Mazovia has a flat landscape (in contrast to Lesser Poland) and no lakes (in contrast to Greater Poland). It is spread over the Mazovian Lowland, on both sides of the Vistula river and its confluence with Narew and Bug. Forests (mainly coniferous) cover one-fifth of the region, with the large Kampinos Forest, Puszcza Biała, and Puszcza Zielona.

In the north Mazovia borders on the Masurian subregion of former Prussia, in the east on Podlachia, in the south on Lesser Poland and in the west on Greater Poland (subregions of Łęczyca Land, Kujawy and Dobrzyń Land). The area of Mazovia is 33,500 km^{2}. It has population of 5 million (3 million of them inhabit the metropolis of Warsaw).

== History ==
Inhabited by the various Lechitic West Slavic tribes, Vistula Veneti and with other people who had settled here, such as the Wielbark people.

=== Middle Ages ===
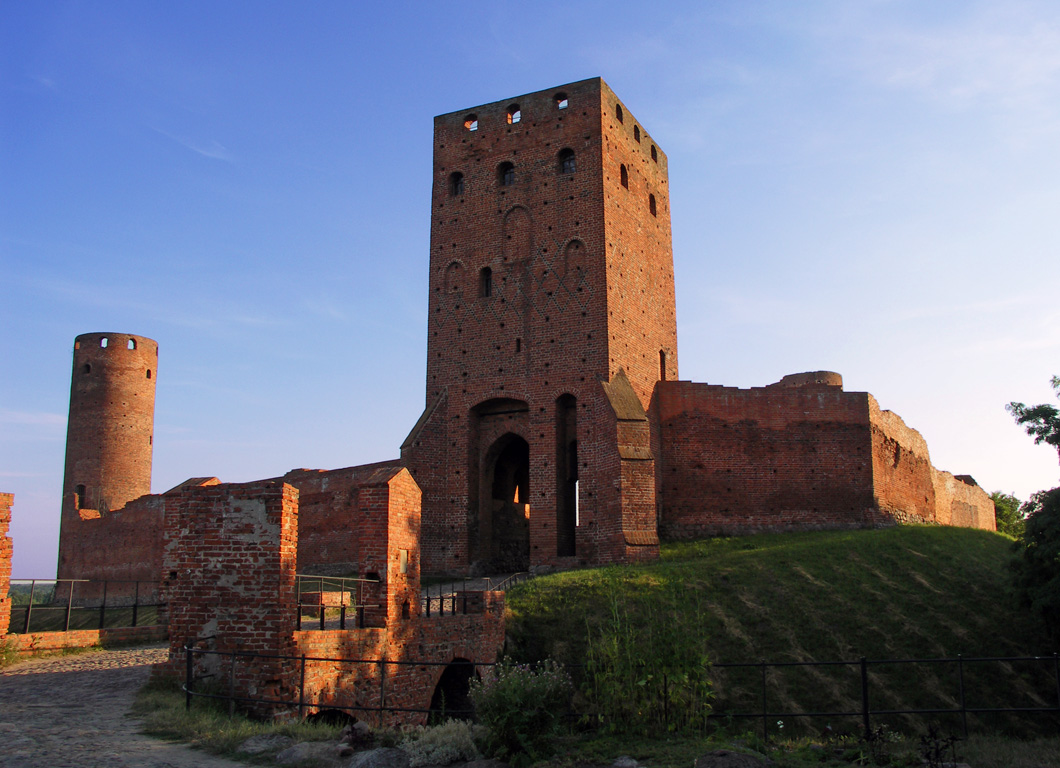
Castle of the Mazovian Dukes in Czersk, 1410

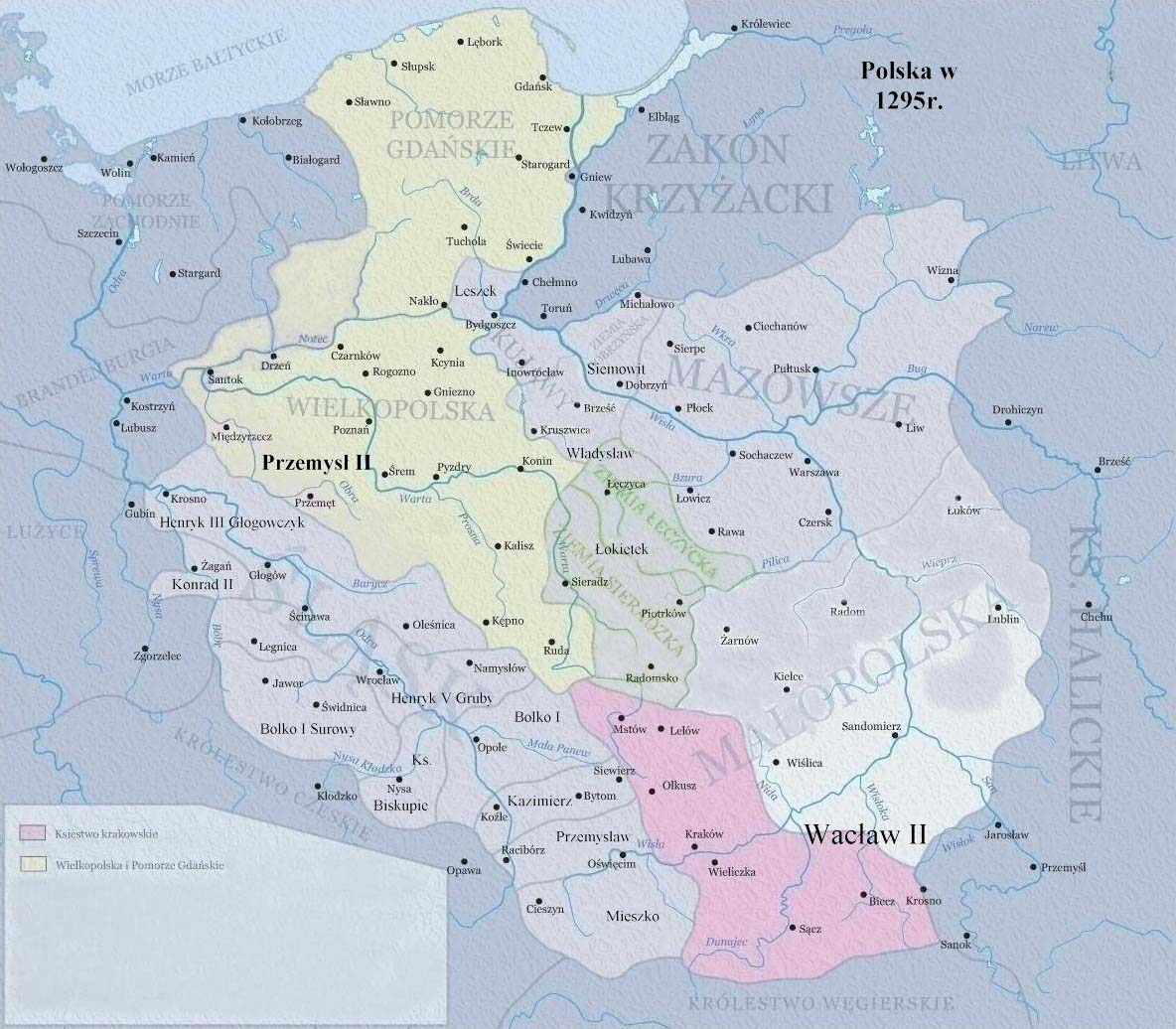
Poland under Przemysł II in 1295

The historical region of Mazovia (Mazowsze) initially encompassed only the territories on the right bank of the Vistula near Płock and had strong connections with Greater Poland (through Włocławek and Kruszwica). During the rule of the first Polish monarchs of the Piast dynasty, Płock was one of their seats, and on the Cathedral Hill (Wzgórze Tumskie) they raised a palatium. In the period 1037–1047, it was the capital of the independent Mazovian state of Masław. Between 1079 and 1138, this city was de facto the capital of Poland. Since 1075 it has been the seat of the Diocese of Płock encompassing northern Mazovia; the south formed the archdeaconate of Czersk belonging to Poznań, and the Duchy of Łowicz was part of the Archdiocese of Gniezno (this division remained as long as until the Partitions of Poland).

During the 9th century, Mazovia was perhaps inhabited by the tribe of Mazovians, and it was incorporated into the Polish state in the second half of the 10th century under the Piast ruler Mieszko I. As a result of the fragmentation of Poland after the death of the Polish monarch Bolesław III Wrymouth, the Duchy of Mazovia was established in 1138. During the 12th and 13th centuries, it temporarily joined various adjacent lands and endured invasions by the Prussians, Yotvingians, and Ruthenians. To protect its northern section, Conrad I of Mazovia called in the Teutonic Knights in 1226 and granted them the Chełmno Land as a fief.

After the reunification of the Polish state by Władysław I in the early 14th century, Mazovia became its fief in 1351. In the second half of the 15th century, western Mazovia, and in 1526/1529, the main part (with its capital in Warsaw), were incorporated into the Polish state. In the 15th century the eastern part of the region (Łomża) was settled, mainly by the yeomanry (drobna szlachta). Mazovia was considered underdeveloped compared with Greater Poland and Lesser Poland, having the lowest urban population.

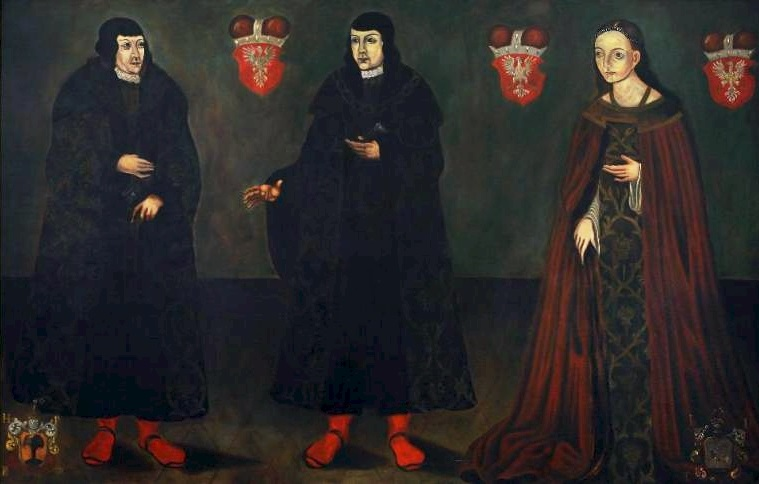
Janusz III of Masovia, Stanisław and Anna of Masovia, 1520

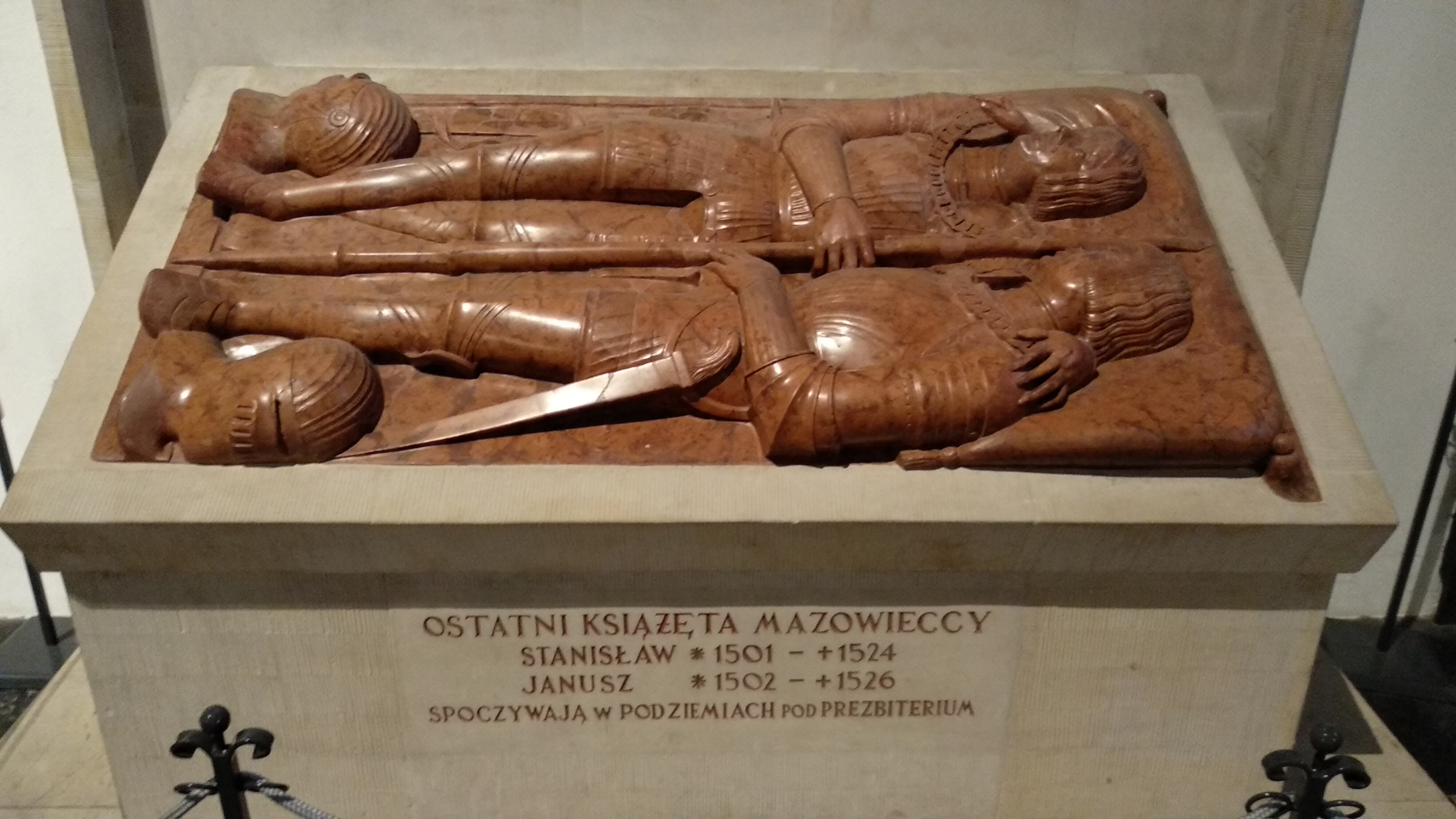
Tombstone of Janusz III and his brother Stanisław in St. John's Archcathedral, Warsaw

=== Modern period ===
In the Early Modern Times, Mazovia was known for exporting grain, timber, and fur. It was also distinct because there was no reformation here. Mazovia was divided into three voivodeships, each of them divided into lands (Polish: ziemie, Latin: terrae), each of them divided into counties (Polish: powiaty, Latin: districtus), and all three voivodeships formed part of the larger Greater Poland Province. The Polish-Lithuanian Union of Lublin (1569) established Mazovia as the central region of the Polish–Lithuanian Commonwealth, with Warsaw rising to prominence as the seat of the state legislature (sejm). In 1596, King Sigismund III Vasa moved the Polish capital from Kraków to Warsaw. During the 17th and 18th centuries, Swedish, Transylvanian, Saxon, and Russian invasions wreaked havoc on the region.

In 1793, western Mazovia, and two years later the rest of the region, were annexed by the Kingdom of Prussia in the Second and Third Partitions of Poland, while the south-eastern portion was annexed by Austria. In 1807, it became part of the Duchy of Warsaw. In 1815, the region was incorporated into the Congress Kingdom of Poland, which was dependent on the Russian Empire. In the 19th century, Mazovia was the site of large Polish uprisings (November Uprising and January Uprising) against Russian rule. In that era, pre-partition Mazovia was divided among Warsaw, Płock, and Augustów (the last one replaced later by Łomża).

Since 1918, Mazovia has been a part of the resurrected Poland, being roughly equivalent to the Warsaw Voivodeship. In 1920, Mazovia was invaded by Soviet Russia, but Poland secured its freedom in the victorious Battle of Warsaw.

=== World War II ===
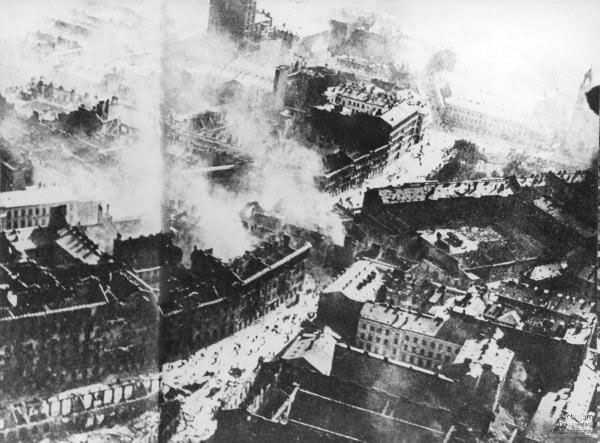
Siege of Warsaw (1939)

During the joint German-Soviet invasion of Poland, which started World War II in September 1939, the German Army invaded Mazovia, and the Einsatzgruppen IV and V followed to commit various crimes against Poles. The largest massacres were committed in Zambrów, Śladów, and Zakroczym, in which over 200, over 300, and around 600 Polish prisoners of war and civilians were murdered, respectively. On 25–29 September, the Germans handed over north-eastern Mazovia with Łomża and Zambrów to the Soviet Union in accordance with the Molotov–Ribbentrop Pact.

Under German occupation, the population was subjected to mass arrests, executions, expulsions and deportations to forced labour, concentration camps and Nazi ghettos, whereas under Soviet occupation the population was subjected to mass arrests, executions, deportation to forced labour in Siberia, Central Asia and the Far North. Numerous sites were looted. The Palmiry massacres carried out by Nazi Germany in the village of Palmiry near Warsaw, were one of the largest massacres of Poles committed during the Intelligenzaktion and AB-Aktion; many Poles from north-eastern Mazovia were among the victims of the Soviet-perpetrated Katyn massacre. Despite such circumstances, the Polish resistance was organized and active in the region. Following the Operation Barbarossa in 1941, Germany also occupied north-eastern Mazovia.

The Warsaw Ghetto was the largest German-established Jewish ghetto in occupied Europe. Other sizeable ghettos in the region were located in Otwock, Płońsk, Łomża and Płock, with the surviving Jews eventually deported by the occupiers to the Treblinka, Auschwitz and other extermination camps during the Holocaust.

In the winter of 1942–1943, the Germans buried some 300 kidnapped Polish children from another region of occupied Poland in the Łąck forests, after the children froze to death in a freight train. Since 1943, the Sicherheitspolizei also carried out deportations of Poles, including teenage boys from Płock and Łomża to the Stutthof concentration camp.

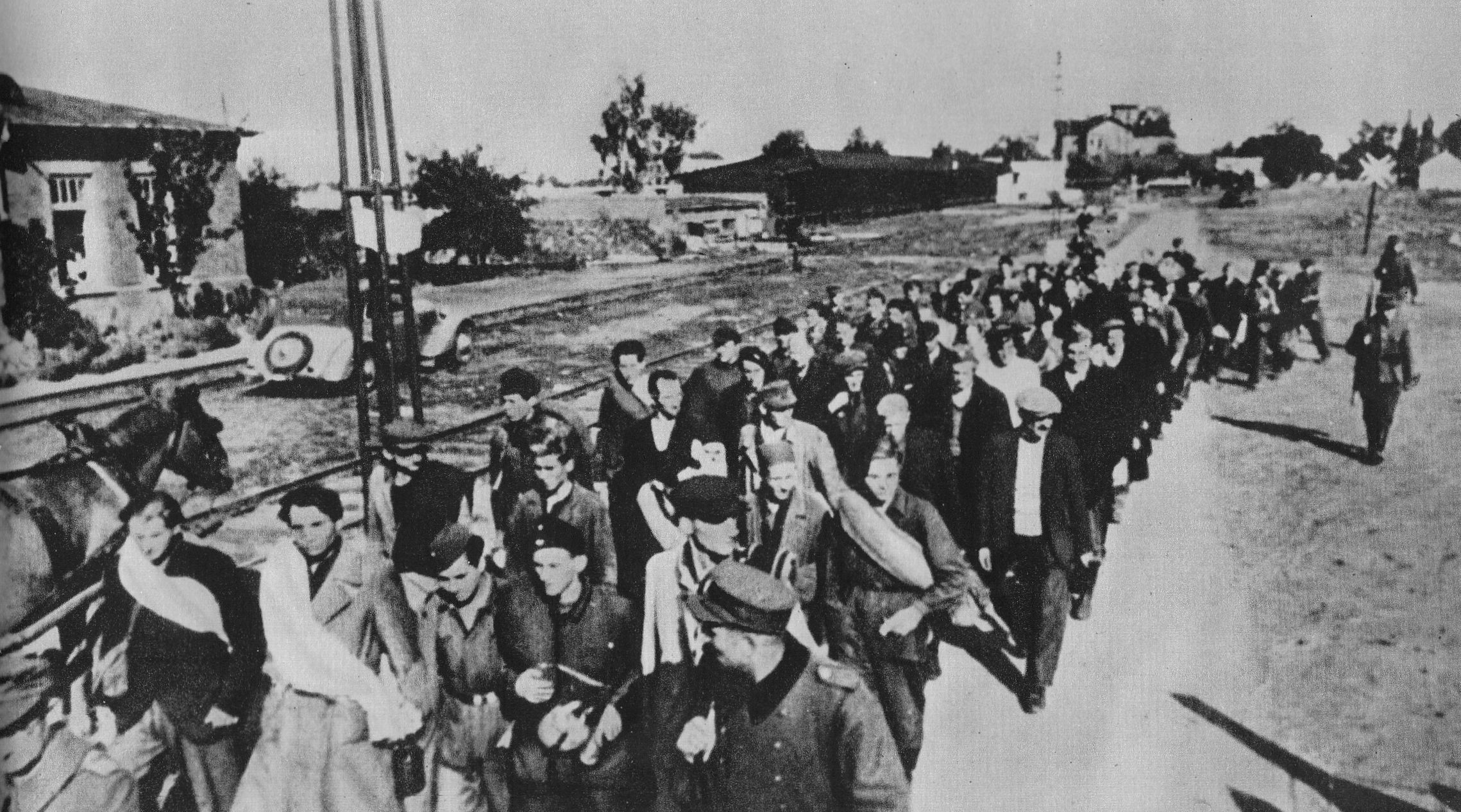
Expelled Poles from Warsaw in Pruszków following the Warsaw Uprising of 1944

Germany operated several prisoner-of-war camps, including Oflag 73, Stalag 319, Stalag 324, Stalag 333 and Stalag 368 with several subcamps, for Polish, Italian, Soviet and Romanian POWs in the region.

The population of Warsaw decreased sharply as a result of executions, the extermination of the city's Jews, the deaths of some 200,000 inhabitants during the Warsaw Uprising of 1944, and the deportation of the city's left-bank population following the uprising. Some 40,000–50,000 Poles were murdered in the Wola massacre alone, one of the largest massacres of Poles. Shortly after the uprising, Adolf Hitler ordered German troops to destroy the city.

In 1944–1945, the Soviet Red Army occupied the region, which was gradually restored to Poland, although with a Soviet-installed communist regime, which then stayed in power until the Fall of Communism in the 1980s.

=== Recent history ===
The rebuilding of the Polish capital was the main task of the postwar period.

The Polish resistance remained active, with one of the last Polish anti-communist partisans, Stanisław Marchewka, killed by the communists in Jeziorko in 1957. Particularly large anti-communist protest occurred in the region in 1976.

During and following the Korean War, in 1951–1959, Poland admitted 200 North Korean orphans in Gołotczyzna and Otwock in Mazovia.

During the Warsaw Voivodeship period, the area remained roughly similar to historical Mazovia and was informally called Mazovia, but in 1975 it was divided into several small voivodeships. However, in 1999 Mazovian Voivodeship was created as one of 16 administrative regions of Poland.

== Culture ==
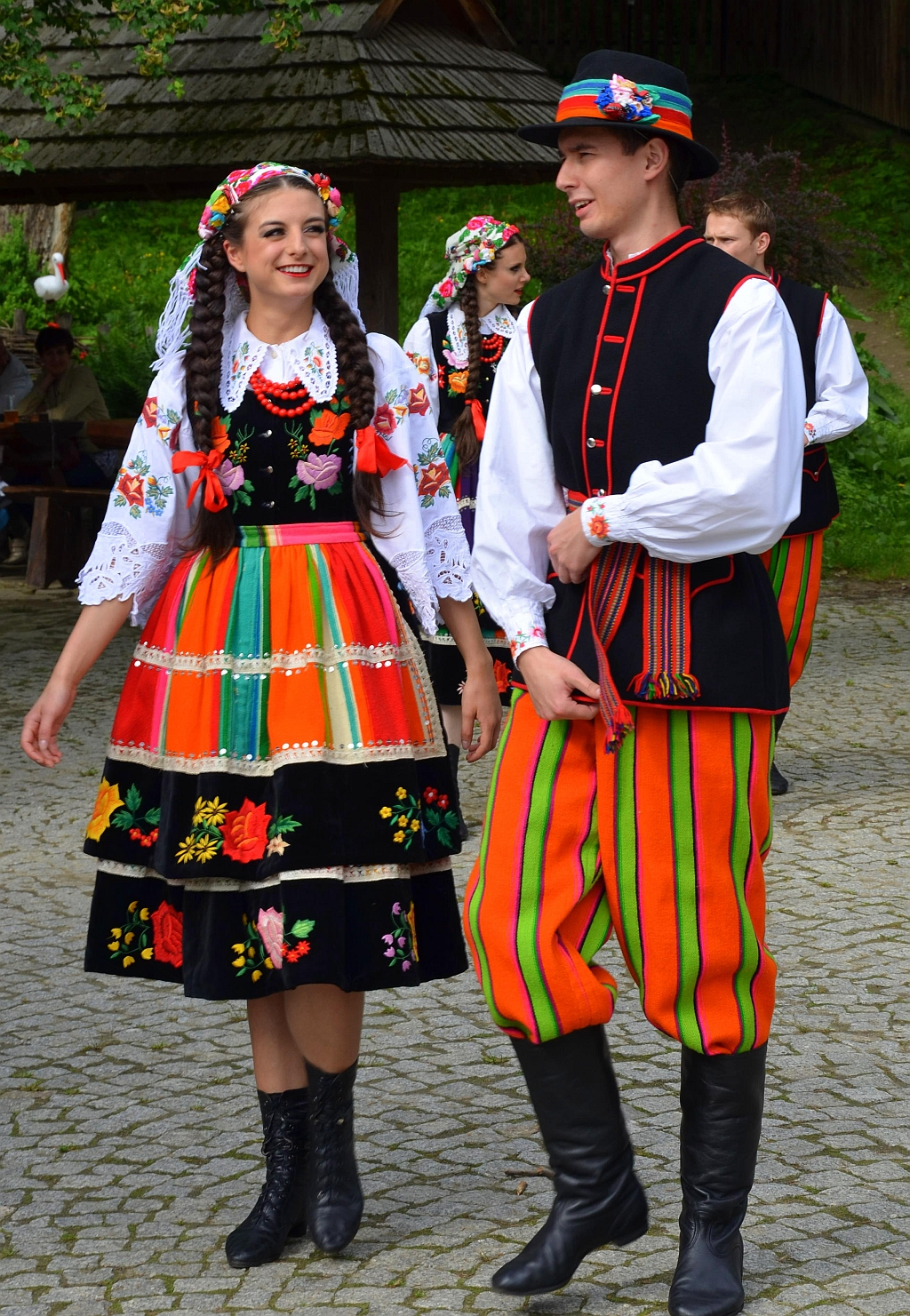
Folk costumes from Łowicz sub-region

=== Mazovian dialect ===
The Mazovian language probably existed as a separate dialect until the 20th century. The ethnonym Mazur has given the name for a phonetic phenomenon known as mazurzenie (although it is common in the Lesser Polish dialect as well).

=== Local cuisine ===
There is no specific regional cuisine of Mazovia. Formerly, dairy foods dominated the peasant cuisine. Nobles used poultry, geese, chickens, and ducks. The most distinct Mazovian culinary regions are Kurpie and Łowicz, where traditional dishes survive to this day. In Kurpie, traditional dishes are prepared with ingredients collected in the forest: berries, honey, and mushrooms. There are several traditional Polish dishes, such as flaki (tripe) and kluski (noodles and dumplings), which are prepared differently than in other parts of Poland.

== Economy ==
Mazovian Voivodeship is ranked decidedly first in Poland according to the Gross Domestic Product. This is thanks to Warsaw, which is a financial centre of East-Central Europe. The majority of state enterprises are headquartered in this metropolis. It is a hub for both rail and vehicular traffic, with access throughout Poland and across Europe. Warsaw Chopin Airport is the nation's busiest. Many branches of industry and services are well developed in this city. The other economic center is Płock, where large petrochemical plants operated by PKN Orlen are located. The rest of Mazovia belongs to the poorest parts of Poland. In agriculture, the most typical Mazovian crops are potatoes and rye, but the most popular (as in the whole of Poland) is wheat. Others are barley, sugar beets, fruits (with their biggest Polish basin in the south of the region), and vegetables. Pigs are commonly bred, often also cows and chickens.

== Tourism ==
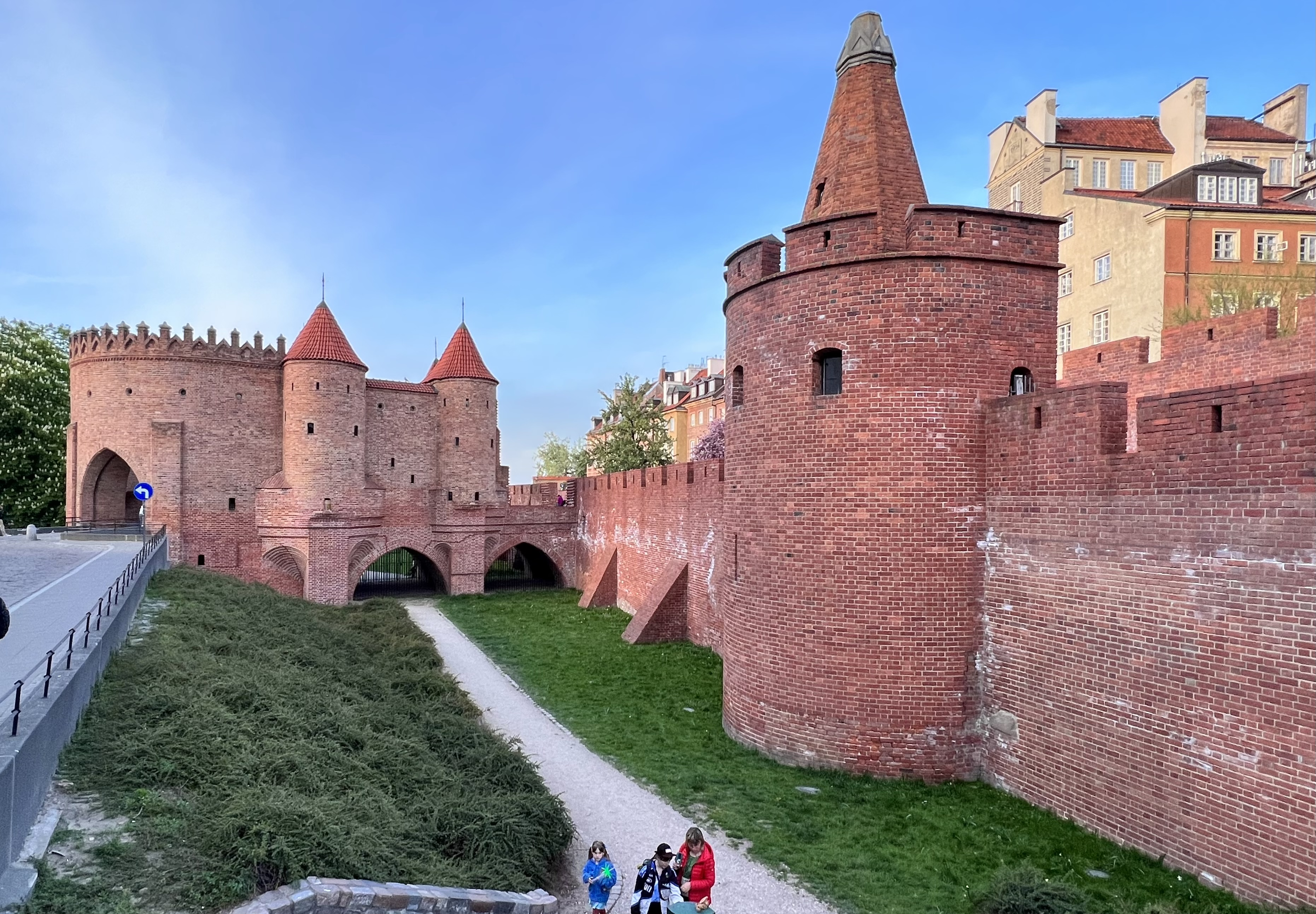
Warsaw Old Town, a UNESCO World Heritage Site and Historic Monument of Poland

Kampinos National Park is one of Poland's largest national parks and is popular with tourists making day trips from Warsaw to hike through its primeval forests, dunes, and marshes. The main cultural centre of the region, and, alongside Kraków, in all of Poland, is Warsaw, which is home to dozens of theatres, the National Philharmonic, the National Opera House, the National Library, the National Museum, Centrum Nauki Kopernik, Warsaw Rising Museum, Temple of Divine Providence, and the Sanctuary of Blessed Jerzy Popiełuszko. Warsaw has many magnificent historic buildings and monuments, including those in the Old Town and the New Town, both of which were almost completely demolished during World War II but were meticulously restored and designated UNESCO World Heritage sites in 1980. Several important edifices have been built on the adjacent street Krakowskie Przedmieście. There are also royal palaces and gardens of Łazienki and Wilanów. The most recognizable building from the post-war period is Pałac Kultury i Nauki.

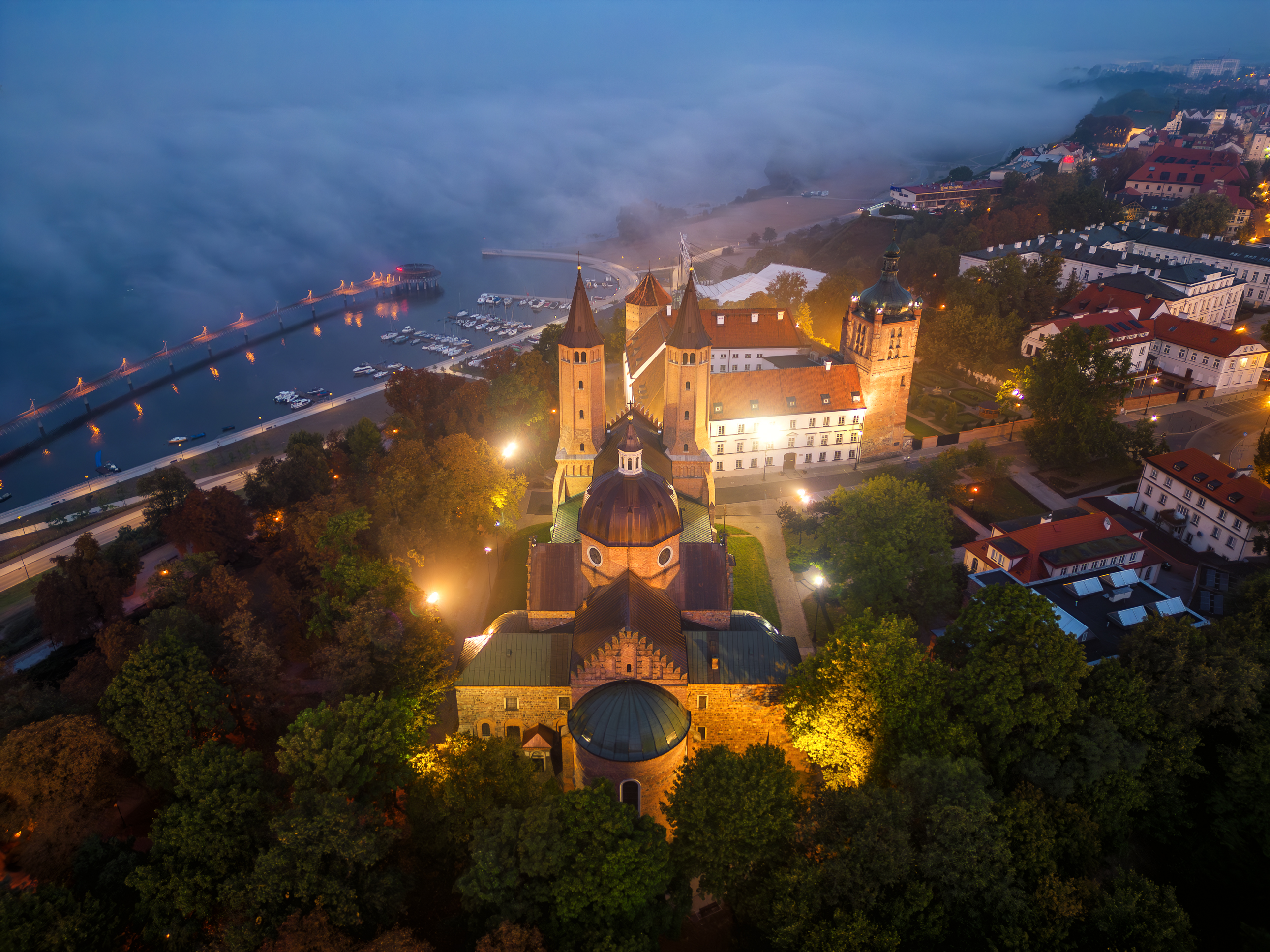
Płock Cathedral, one of the burial sites of Polish monarchs, a Historic Monument of Poland

Masovia also boasts 11 Historic Monuments of Poland:

- Romanesque Czerwińsk Abbey with the Basilica of the Annunciation of Holy Virgin Mary in Czerwińsk nad Wisłą
- Cathedral Basilica of the Assumption of the Blessed Virgin Mary and St. Nicholas in Łowicz
- Baroque Nieborów Palace and park complex
- Wzgórze Tumskie (Cathedral Hill) with the medieval Płock Castle and Płock Cathedral, one of the burial sites of Polish monarchs
- Baroque Basilica of the Annunciation in Pułtusk
- Józef Piłsudski Museum at his former house in Sulejówek
- Historic city center with the Old Town, New Town, Royal Castle, Royal Route and Wilanów Palace in Warsaw
- Building of the Polish Ministry of National Education in Warsaw
- Powązki Cemetery in Warsaw
- Warsaw Water Filters
- 19th-century factory settlement in Żyrardów

Historical monuments elsewhere include the manor house in Żelazowa Wola, where composer Frédéric Chopin was born, and his museum is located nowadays. Płock, once the seat of the Mazovian princes, and Łowicz, the residence of the archbishops of Gniezno, are noted for their cathedrals. There are also palaces and parks in Nieborów and Arkadia, the Modlin Fortress, castles in Czersk, Pułtusk, Ciechanów, Opinogóra, Rawa Mazowiecka, Sochaczew and Liw, as well as churches in Niepokalanów, Góra Kalwaria, Warka, Skierniewice, Czerwińsk, Wyszogród, Zakroczym, Szreńsk, Przasnysz, Ostrołęka, Łomża, Szczuczyn, Wizna, Brok, Zuzela, Rostkowo, and Boguszyce. Interesting folklore is found in the subregion of Kurpie; another skansen has been established in Sierpc.

== Sports ==
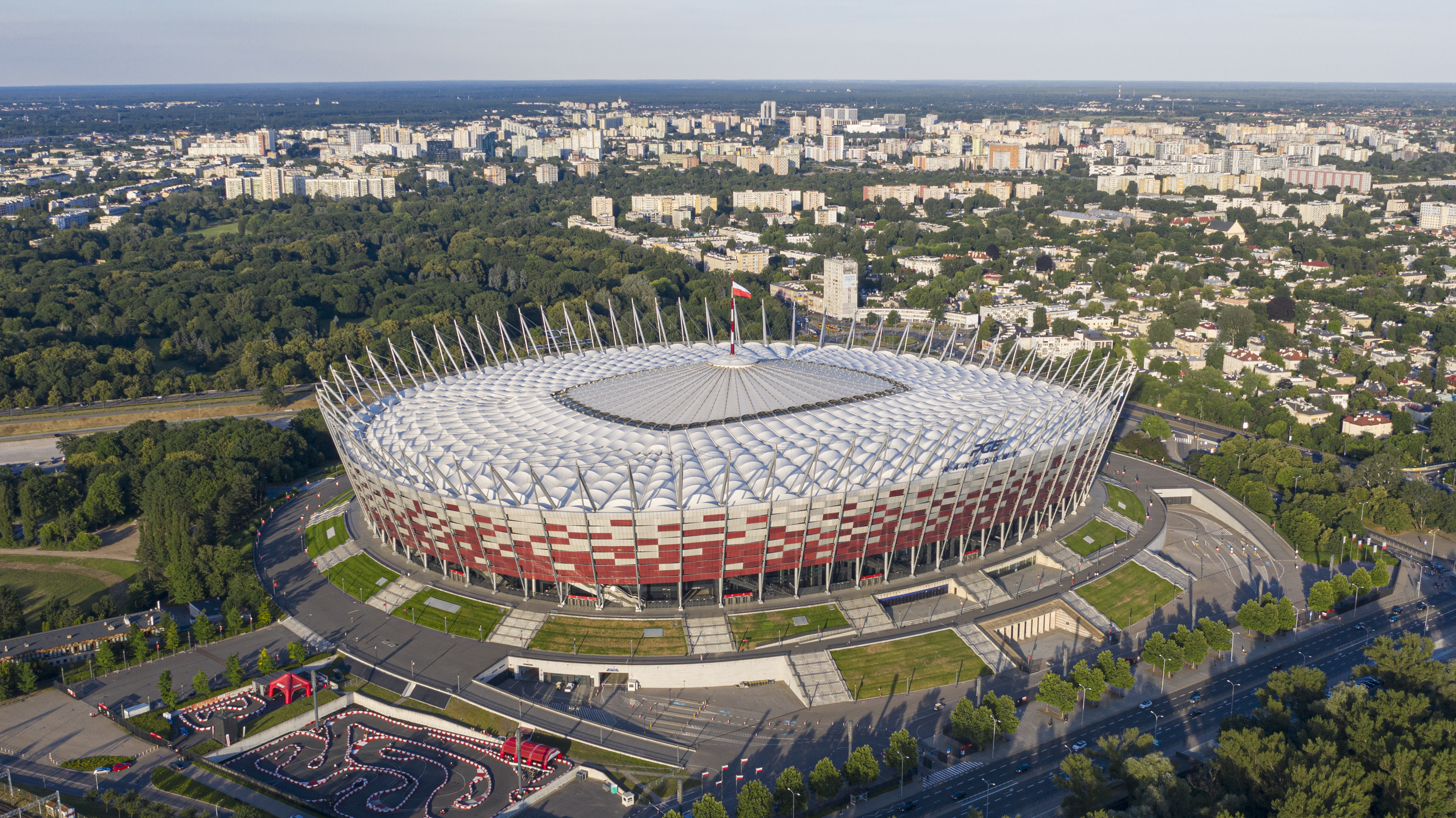
Stadion Narodowy, Warsaw

Successful sports teams in Masovia include association football teams Legia Warsaw, Polonia Warsaw and Wisła Płock, basketball teams Polonia Warsaw, Legia Warsaw and Znicz Pruszków, and handball teams Wisła Płock and KS Warszawianka.

== Main cities and towns ==
The following table lists the cities in Mazovia with a population greater than 20,000 (2015):

	City	Population (2015)	Voivodeship in 1750	Voivodeship in 2016	Additional information
1.	Warsaw	1 724 404	Masovian Voivodeship	Masovian Voivodeship	Capital of Poland, former royal city of Poland.
2.	Płock	122 815	Płock Voivodeship	Masovian Voivodeship	Historical capital of Masovia, former capital of Poland, former royal city of Poland.
3.	Łomża	62 711	Masovian Voivodeship	Podlaskie Voivodeship	Former royal city of Poland.
4.	Pruszków	59 570	Masovian Voivodeship	Masovian Voivodeship	Part of the Warsaw metropolitan area.
5.	Legionowo	54 231	Masovian Voivodeship	Masovian Voivodeship	Part of the Warsaw metropolitan area.
6.	Ostrołęka	52 917	Masovian Voivodeship	Masovian Voivodeship	Former royal city of Poland.
7.	Skierniewice	48 634	Rawa Voivodeship	Łódź Voivodeship	Former private bishop town of Poland.
8.	Otwock	45 044	Masovian Voivodeship	Masovian Voivodeship	Part of the Warsaw metropolitan area.
9.	Piaseczno	44 869	Masovian Voivodeship	Masovian Voivodeship	Former royal city of Poland, part of the Warsaw metropolitan area.
10.	Ciechanów	44 797	Masovian Voivodeship	Masovian Voivodeship	Former royal city of Poland.
11.	Żyrardów	41 096	Rawa Voivodeship	Masovian Voivodeship	
12.	Mińsk Mazowiecki	39 880	Masovian Voivodeship	Masovian Voivodeship	Part of the Warsaw metropolitan area.
13.	Wołomin	37 505	Masovian Voivodeship	Masovian Voivodeship	Part of the Warsaw metropolitan area.
14.	Sochaczew	37 480	Rawa Voivodeship	Masovian Voivodeship	Former royal city of Poland.
15.	Ząbki	31 884	Masovian Voivodeship	Masovian Voivodeship	Part of the Warsaw metropolitan area.
16.	Mława	30 880	Płock Voivodeship	Masovian Voivodeship	Former royal city of Poland.
17.	Grodzisk Mazowiecki	29 907	Rawa Voivodeship	Masovian Voivodeship	Former private town of the Mokronoski family, part of the Warsaw metropolitan area.
18.	Łowicz	29 420	Rawa Voivodeship	Łódź Voivodeship	Temporary de facto capital of Poland in years 1572–1573, former private bishop town.
19.	Marki	29 032	Masovian Voivodeship	Masovian Voivodeship	Part of the Warsaw metropolitan area.
20.	Nowy Dwór Mazowiecki	28 287	Masovian Voivodeship	Masovian Voivodeship	Former private town, part of the Warsaw metropolitan area.
21.	Wyszków	27 222	Masovian Voivodeship	Masovian Voivodeship	Former private bishop town of Poland.
22.	Piastów	22 826	Masovian Voivodeship	Masovian Voivodeship	Part of the Warsaw metropolitan area.
23.	Ostrów Mazowiecka	22 796	Masovian Voivodeship	Masovian Voivodeship	Former royal city of Poland.
24.	Płońsk	22 494	Płock Voivodeship	Masovian Voivodeship	Former royal city of Poland.
25.	Zambrów	22 451	Masovian Voivodeship	Podlaskie Voivodeship	Former royal city of Poland.
26.	Grajewo	22 246	Masovian Voivodeship	Podlaskie Voivodeship	Northernmost and easternmost town of Mazovia. It borders the regions of Podlachia and Masuria.
27.	Kobyłka	20 855	Masovian Voivodeship	Masovian Voivodeship	Part of the Warsaw metropolitan area.

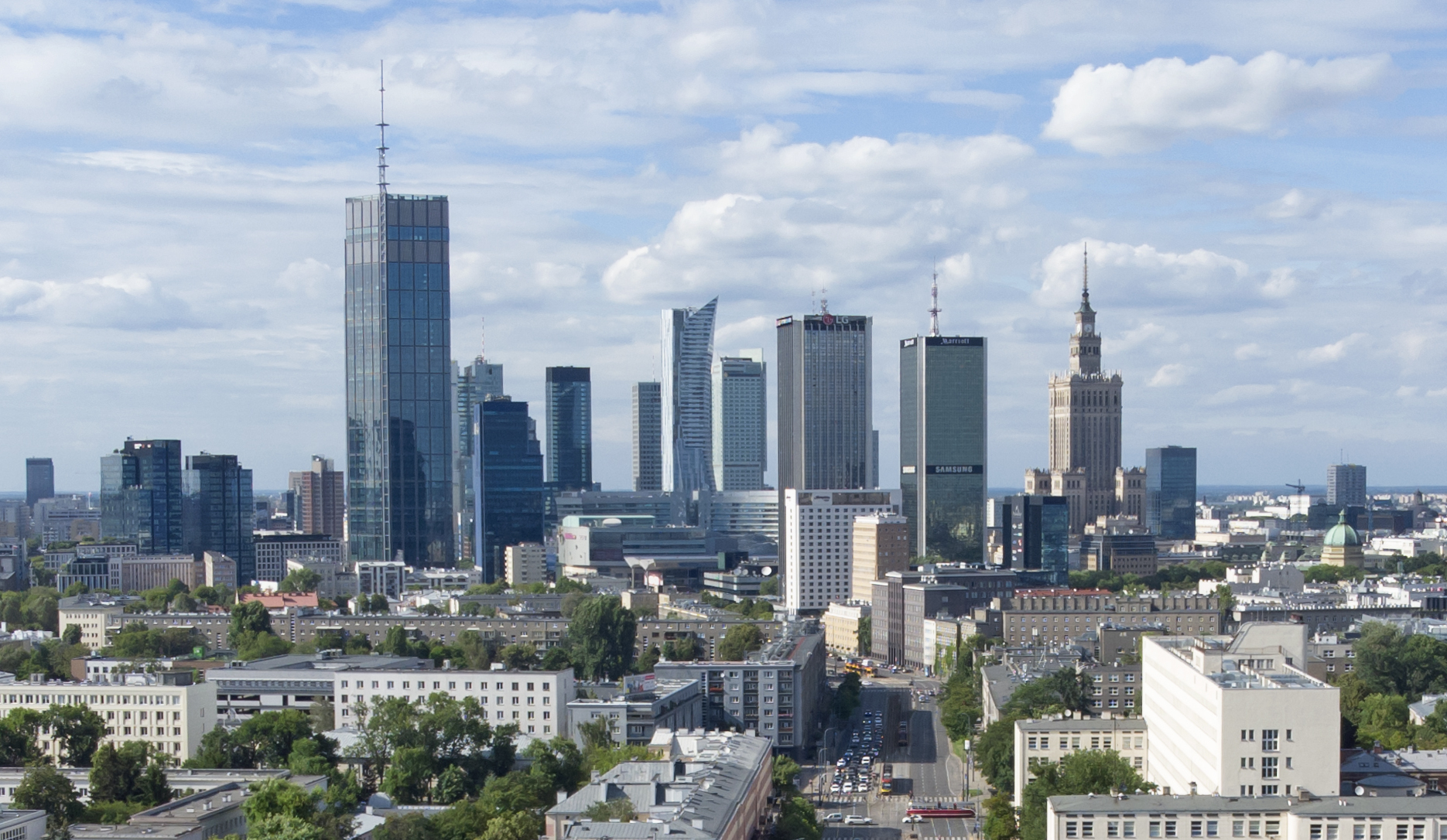
Skyline of Warsaw

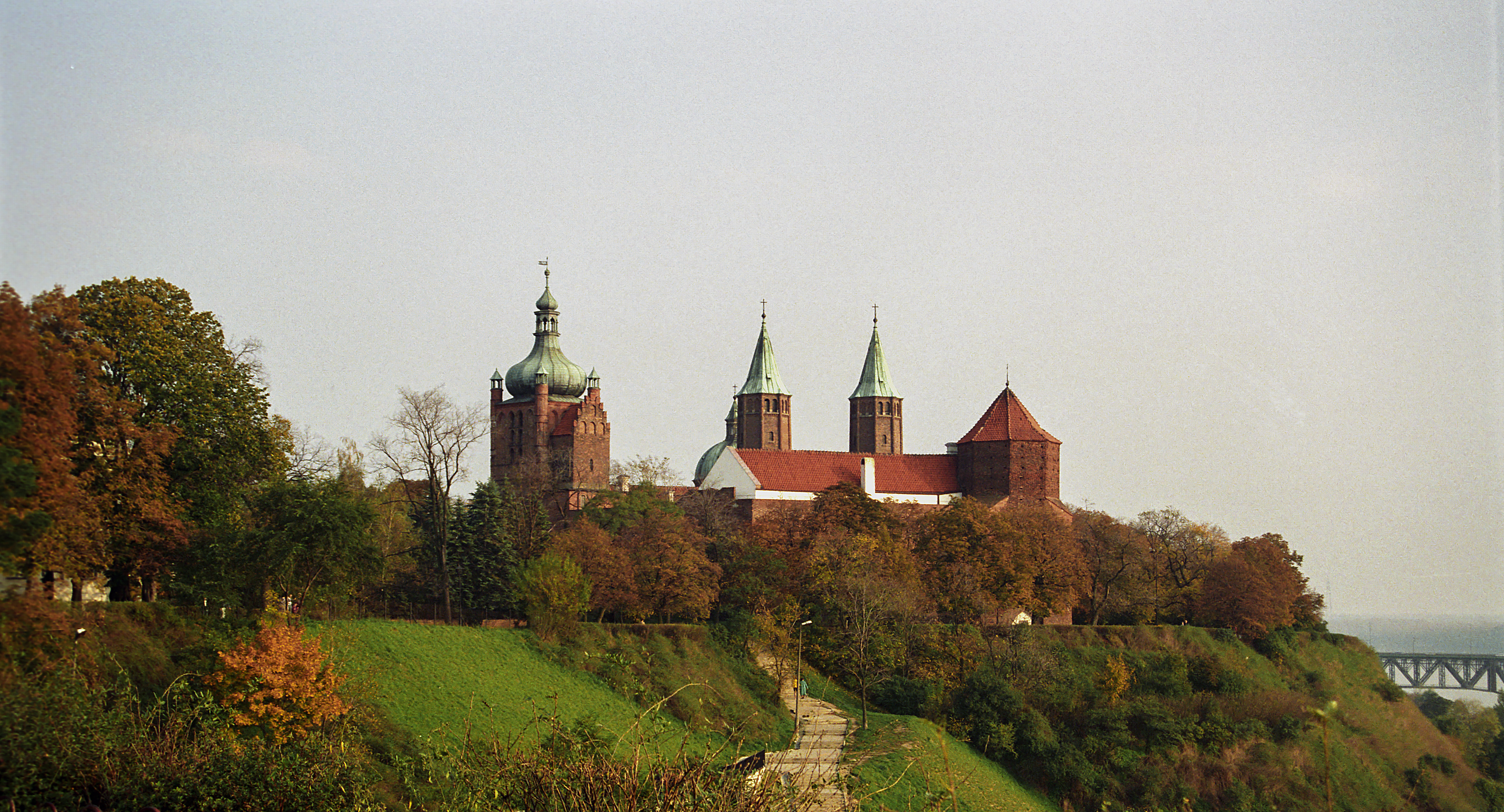
Płock Castle

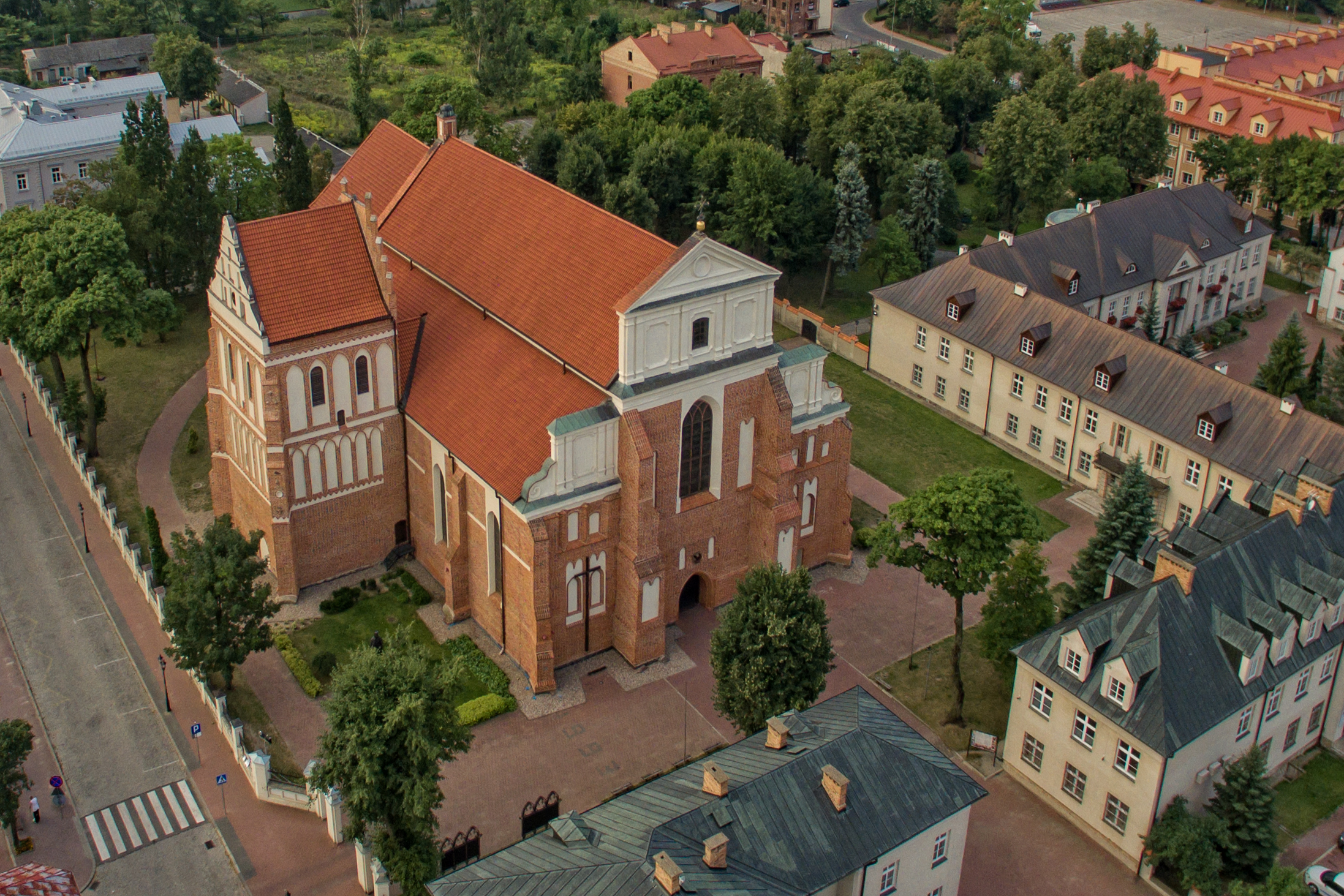
Łomża Cathedral

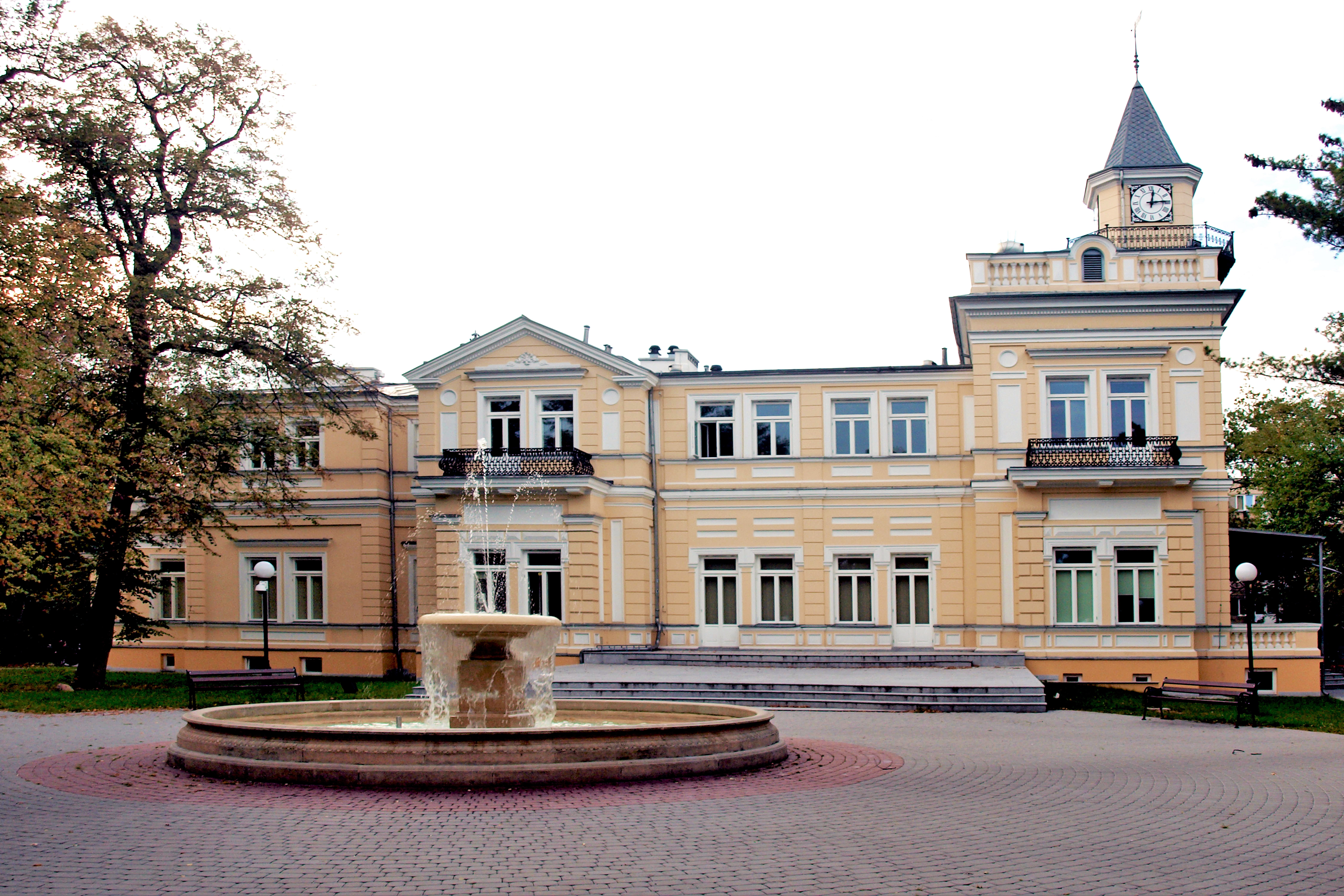
Sokół Palace in Pruszków

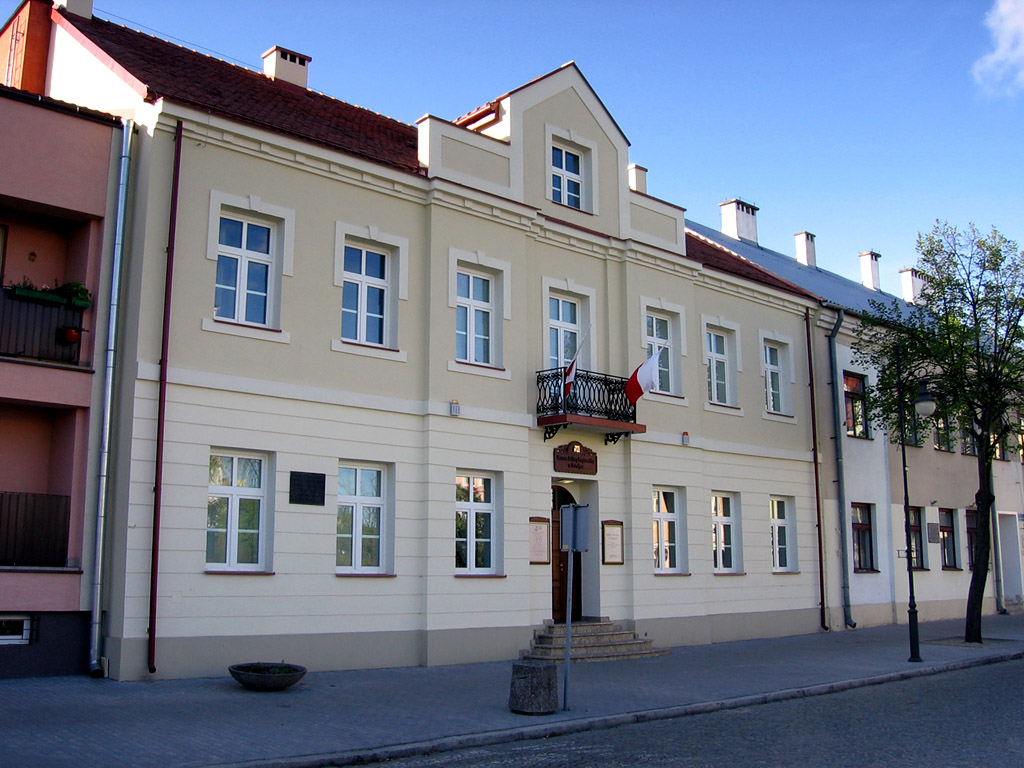
Regional museum in Ostrołęka

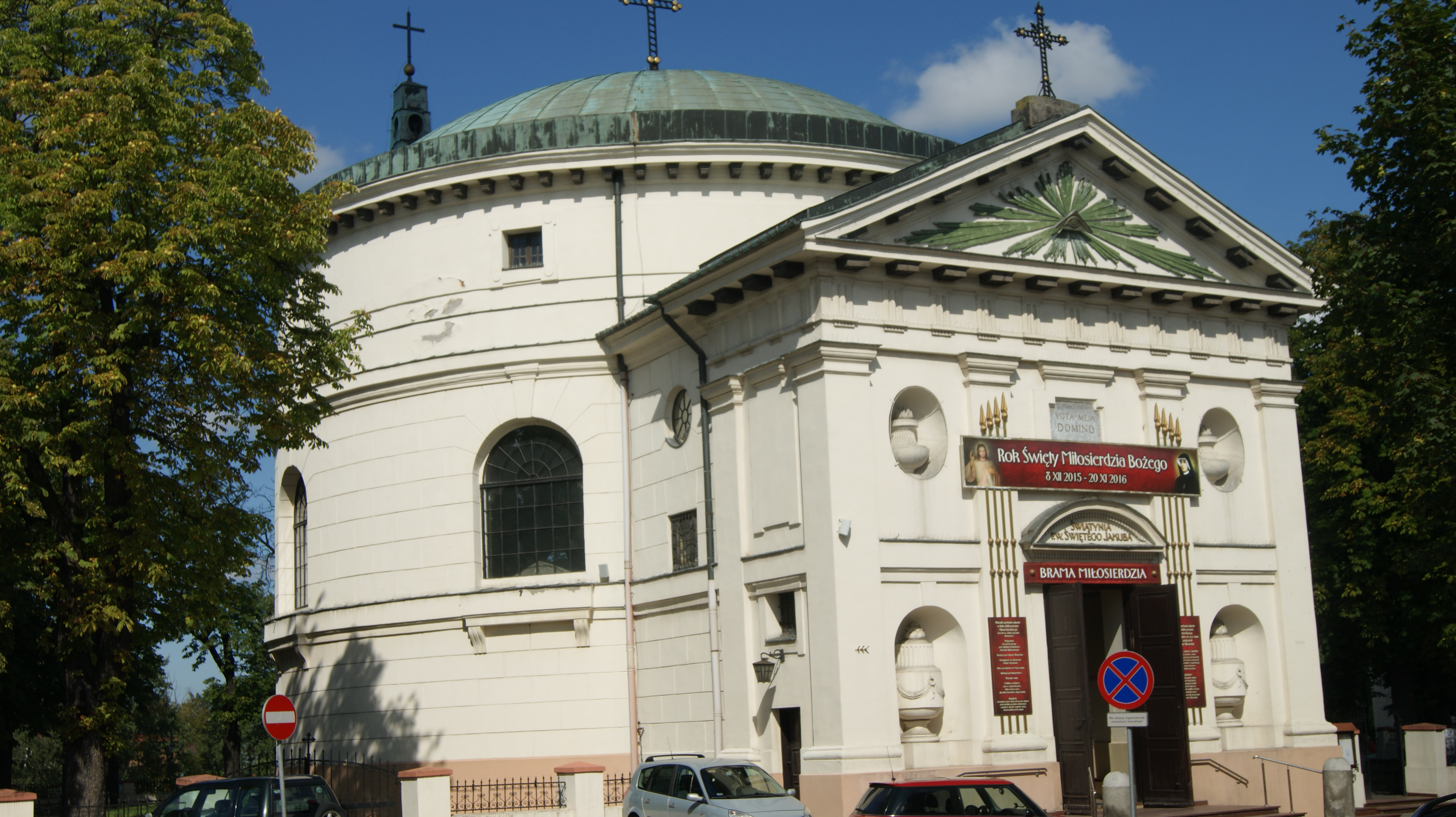
St. Jacob Church in Skierniewice

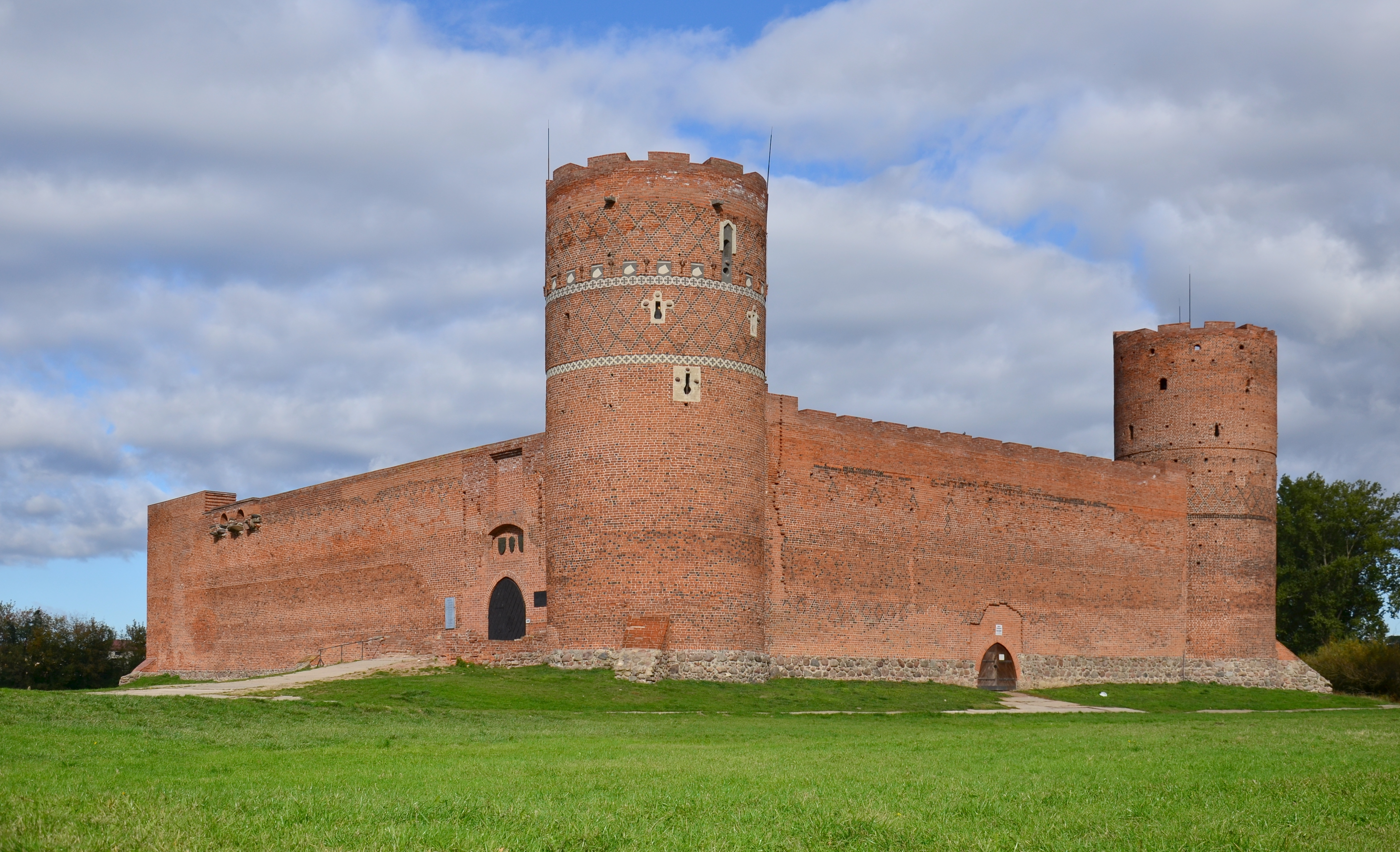
Ciechanów Castle

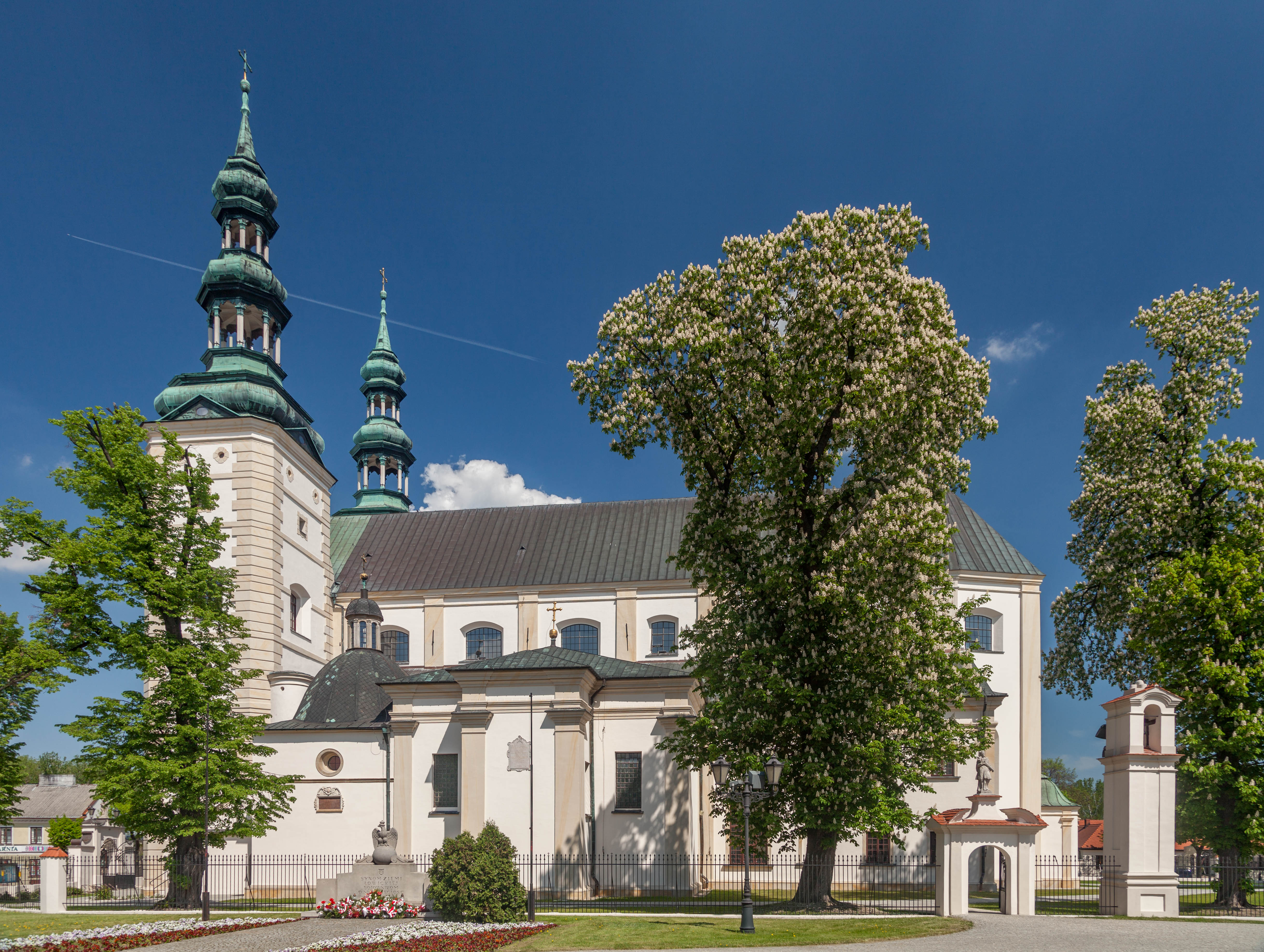
Łowicz Cathedral

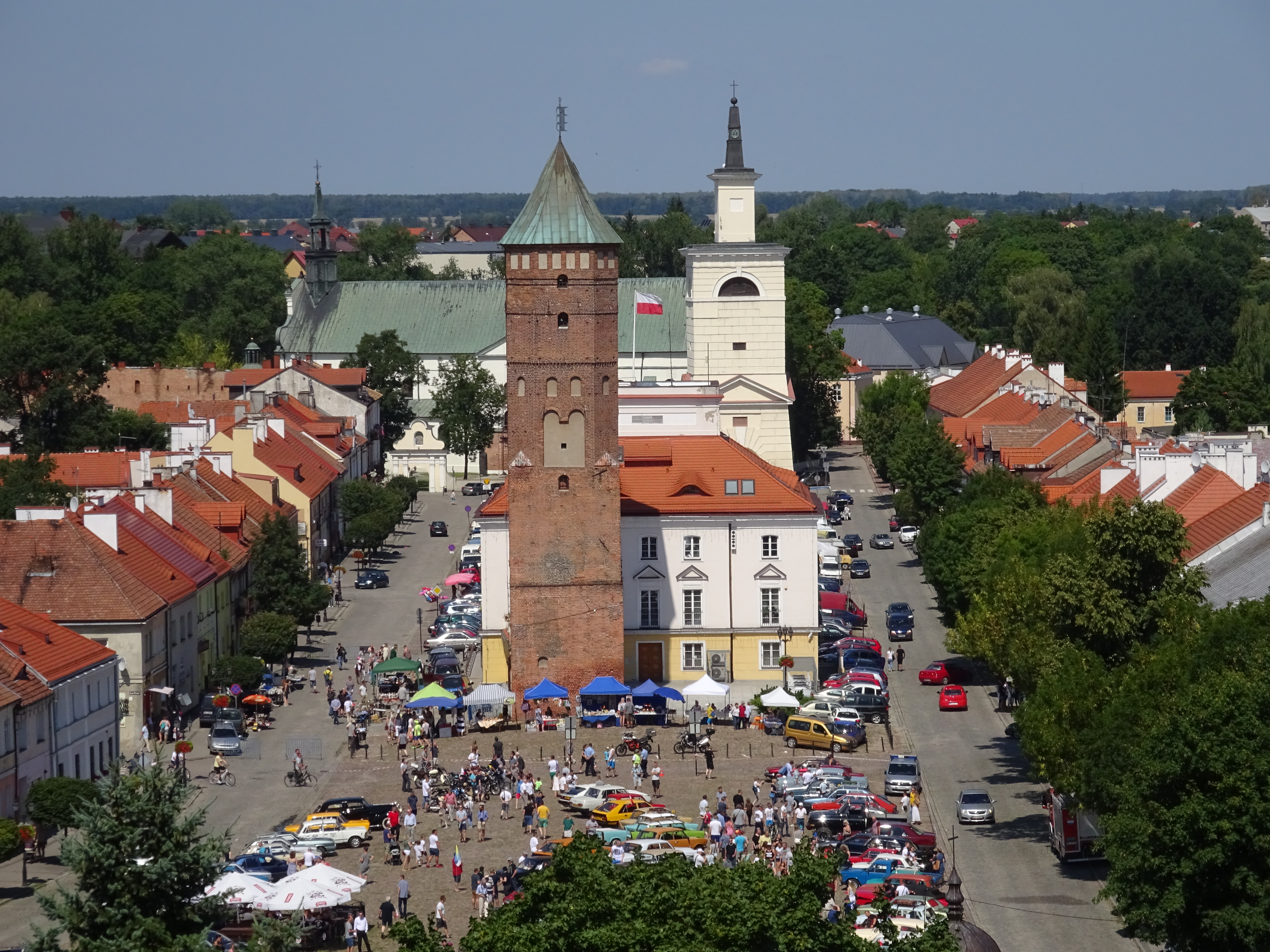
Pułtusk

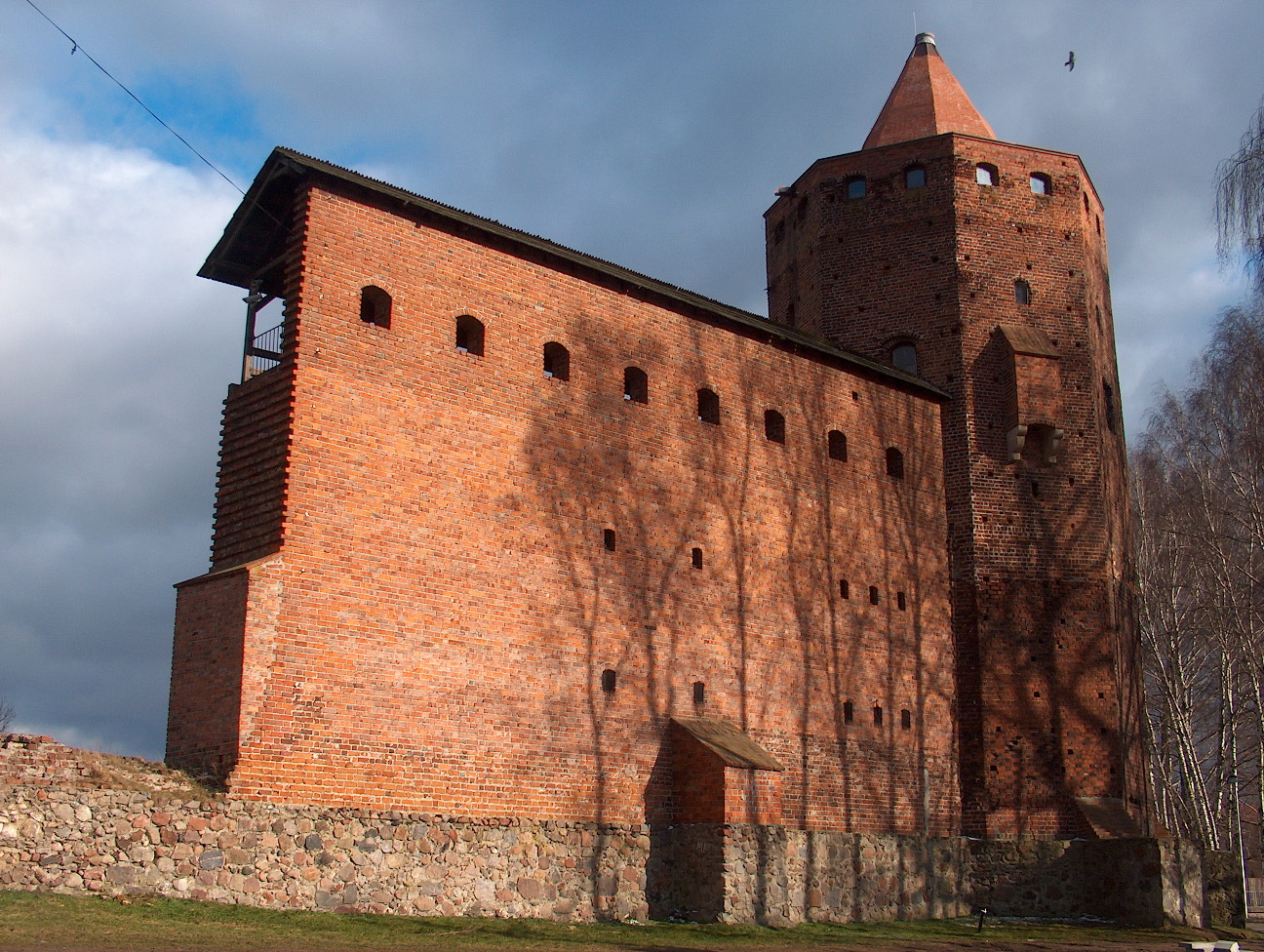
Castle in Rawa Mazowiecka

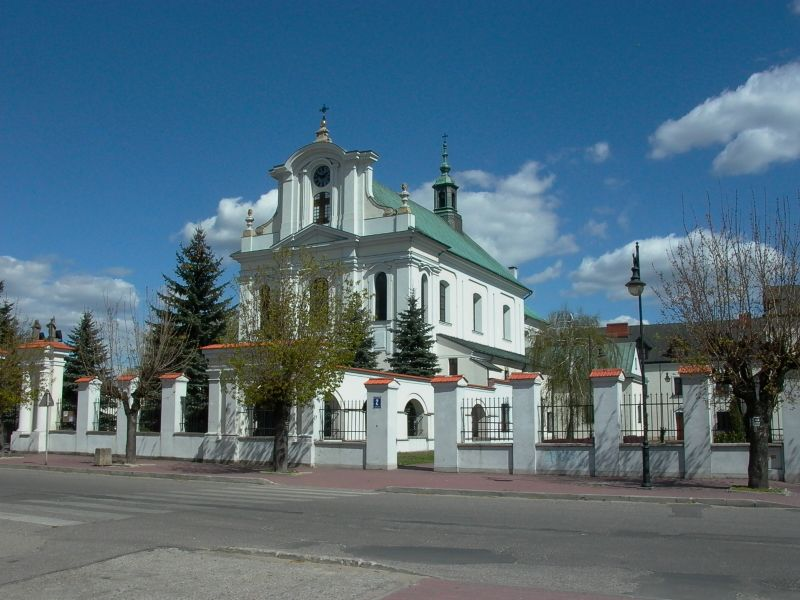
Góra Kalwaria

== See also ==
- Świdermajer – an architectural style in the area
