= Czersk Castle =

Castle of the Masovian Dukes
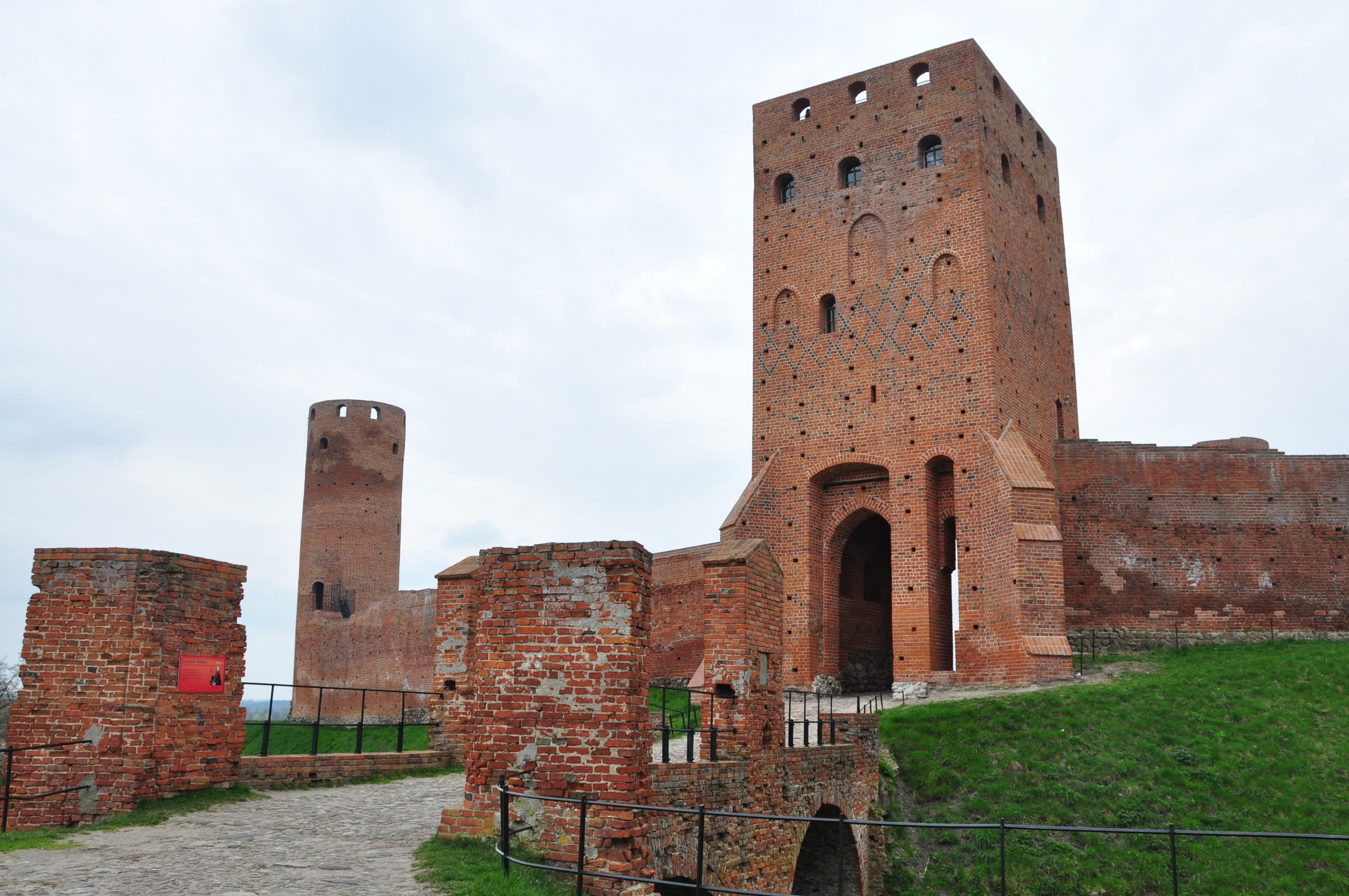

- Location of the Czersk Castle in Poland
- 51°57′30″N 21°14′03″E
- Location: Czersk, Masovian Voivodeship; Poland

History
- Built: 1388–1410
- Demolished: 1656
- Rebuilt: 1762–1766

Site notes
- Architectural style: Brick Gothic

The Castle of the Masovian Dukes is a medieval Brick Gothic castle located in the village of Czersk (36 km south of Warsaw), Masovian Voivodeship, in Poland.

== History ==
The Czersk Castle was built at the turning point of the fourteenth and fifteenth century by Duke Janusz I, after the Masovian land became part of the Kingdom of Poland under the rule of Queen Bona Sforza. The castle had three towers, with one of them—being four-sided—used as the main gate house.

In 1656, during the war with the Swedes, the castle was partially ruined, when the retreating land army under Stefan Czarniecki's command had captured and demolished the stronghold. The castle was rebuilt between 1762–1766 under the command of Marszałek Franciszek Bieliński. Later, during the Prussian Partition, a Prussian leader had ordered for demolition of the castle's defense walls, reducing its military importance as a stronghold. In the years to follow, no more reconstruction work on the castle had ever been attempted. Today, only the towers, a brick bridge from the eighteenth century, and the north and east wing of the castle remain of the overall stronghold.

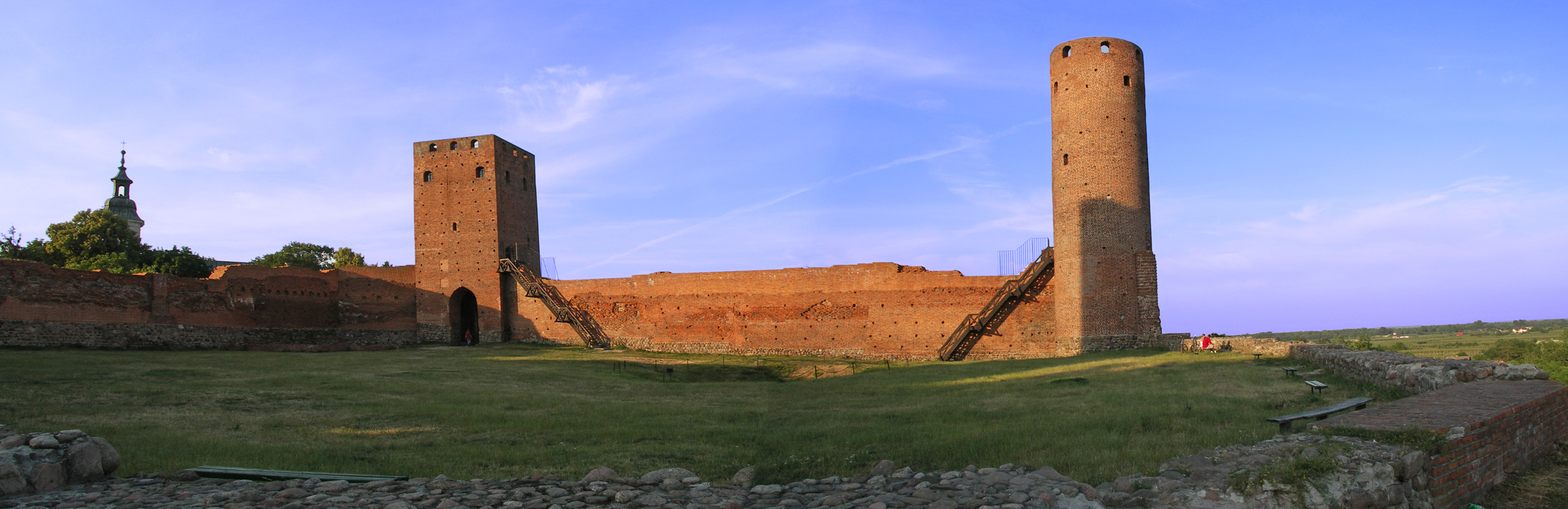
Panorama of the Czersk Castle

== See also ==
- List of castles in Poland
