= List of highest towns by country =

List of highest settlements by country

This is a list of the highest settlements by country. Many of these are too small to be regarded as towns or cities. Only permanent settlements occupied year-round are included. When possible, the highest point in the contiguous year-round settlement is listed, though average heights or the elevations of a central point may also be found.

The elevation of a settlement affects the social and physical arrangement of the place. In many cases, the cold climate in winter necessitates a particular style of house; the type of agriculture practised and the domestic animals kept there are limited; or the type of work carried on is specialised.

== Sovereign, fully recognized countries ==
Rank	Country	Town / city	Region / state	Height (m)	Height (ft)	Comment
1	Peru	La Rinconada	Puno	5,100	16,728	The highest in the world according to National Geographic magazine (May 2003); pop. 30,000. Barrio Rit’ipata, consisting of miners' shacks, is above it.
2	China	Tuiwa	Tibet Autonomous Region	5,070	16,634	Described as the "highest administrative village in the world" by sources such as China Daily.
3	Bolivia	Santa Barbara	Potosí Department	4,770	15,600	
4	India	Karzok	Ladakh	4,570	15,000	Hikkim in Himachal Pradesh has year-round residences from 4330 to 4400 meters. Komic, 2 km to the southeast of Hikkim has residences up to 4530 meters, and Korzok on Tso Moriri has year-round residences from 4525 to 4570 meters.
5	Chile	Parinacota	Arica-Parinacota	4,400	14,435	
6	Nepal	Dingboche	Khumbu, Koshi Province	4,350	14,301	Gorakshep (with an elevation of 5,100 m (16,700 ft)) are lodges near to Mount Everest base camp. Lobuche at 4,950 m (16,240 ft), Gokyo at 4,750 m (15,580 ft), and Dughla, at 4,593 m (15,069 ft), are higher, but likely not permanently inhabited as they cater to trekkers during season.
7	Argentina	Mina Pirquitas	Jujuy Province	4,340	14,240	Mining company town, with up to 673 inhabitants.
8	Afghanistan	Qarabolaq	Wakhan District	4,139	13,579	
9	Kyrgyzstan	Chatyndy	Osh Province	4,013	13,166	
10	Bhutan	Laya	Gasa District	3,820	12,533	
11	Ethiopia	Amaras	Amhara Region	3,728	12,230	
12	Tajikistan	Murghab	Gorno-Badakhshan Autonomous Region	3,650	11,975	
13	Mexico	Raíces	Mexico	3,633	11,919	
14	United States	Alma	Colorado	3,560	11,680	
15	Venezuela	Apartaderos	Mérida	3,505	11,502	3,360 m (11,020 ft) according to Google Maps.
16	Colombia	Vetas	Santander	3,350	10,990	3,230 m (10,600 ft) according to Google Maps.
17	Ecuador	Papallacta	Napo	3,300	10,827	Zumbahua is the highest at 3,510 m (11,520 ft) according to Google Maps.
18	Pakistan	Shimshal	Gilgit-Baltistan	3,200	10,499	
19	Guatemala	Ixchiguán	San Marcos Department	3,185	10,449	highest town in Central America
20	Lesotho	Khalahali	Mokhotlong District	3,158	10,361	
21	Costa Rica	Villa Mills	Cartago Province	3,100	10,173	Near Cerro de la Muerte, Talamanca Range. Permanent population: 65
22	Yemen	Kawkaban	Sana'a Governorate	2,931	9,616	
23	Indonesia	Kwiyawag	Highland Papua	2,848	9,343	
24	Cameroon	Ndu	Southwest Region	2,611	8,566	
25	Eritrea	Adi Keyh	Debub	2,500	8,202	
26	Iran	Fereydunshahr	Isfahan Province	2,490	8,169	Bab Zangi in Kerman Province is higher at 3,310 m (10,860 ft), but is a small village with only 54 inhabitants.
27	Russia	Kurush	Dokuzparinskiy rayon, Dagestan	2,480	8,134	Highest village in Europe
28	Kenya	Iten	Elgeyo-Marakwet County	2,400	7,874	
29	Azerbaijan	Khınalıg	Guba District	2,375	7,710	Population: 2,075
30	Georgia	Bochorna	Akhmeta Municipality	2,345	7,694	population only about 1, so Ushguli is generally seen as the highest 'substantial' village.
31	Morocco	Tacheddirt	Al Haouz	2,314	7,592	
32	Armenia	Akhpradzor	Gegharkunik	2,293	7,523	Aragats research station with several buildings at 3,200 m (10,500 ft) is operating round the year.
33	Rwanda	Byumba	Northern Province	2,237	7,342	
34	Turkey	Kapıköy	Van	2,220	7,284	Population: 635. Karayazı (population 4,724 in 2010) is situated at 2,450 m (8,040 ft)
35	Andorra	El Pas de la Casa	Encamp	2,219	7,280	
36	Italy	Trepalle	Lombardy	2,209	7,247	Cited as highest parish in Europe by its Tourism board
37	Saudi Arabia	Abha	Asir	2,200	7,218	
38	Papua New Guinea	Wabag	Enga Province	2,182	7,162	
39	Mongolia	Altai City	Yesönbulag, Govi-Altai	2,181	7,156	
41	Syria	Rankous	Rif Dimashq Governorate	2,150	7,052	Population: 19,900
42	Switzerland	Juf	Graubünden	2,126	6,973	Village with a population about 24, highest in Europe according to the municipality's (Avers) web page
43	Spain	Pradollano	Granada, Andalucía	2,078	6,817	
44	France	Saint-Véran	Hautes-Alpes	2,040	6,692	Known as the highest commune of France - and the highest commune of Europe
45	South Africa	Dullstroom	Mpumalanga	2,019	6,624	
46	Uganda	Kabale	Western Region	2,000	6,560	
46	Panama	Cerro Punta	Chiriquí Province	2,000	6,560	
46	Timor-Leste	Hatu-Builico	Ainaro District	2,000	6,560	
49	Austria	Obergurgl	Tyrol	1,930	6,332	Hochgurgl is at 2,150 m (7,050 ft), but is not recognized as an independent village, being part of Obergurgl.
50	Burundi	Muramvya	Muramvya Province	1,924	6,315	
51	Sri Lanka	Nuwara Eliya	Nuwara Eliya District, Central Province	1,868	6,128	
52	Algeria	Tazrouk	Tazrouk District, Tamanrasset Province	1,827	5,994	
53	Kazakhstan	Narynkol	Almaty Province	1,819	5,971	
54	Madagascar	Soanindrariny	Vakinankaratra	1,817	5,964	
55	Somalia	Erigavo	Sanaag	1,788	5,869	
56	Comoros	La Convalescence	Grande Comore	1,787	5,866	
57	Oman	Saiq	Ad Dakhiliyah Governorate	1,755	5,758	
58	Lebanon	Bekaa Kafra	North Governorate	1,750	5,740	
59	Namibia	Windhoek	Khomas Region	1,728	5,669	Both the capital and largest city (pop. 286,000).
60	Angola	Huambo and Lubango	Huambo and Huíla	1,721	5,646	
61	Honduras	La Esperanza	Intibucá Department	1,700	5,577	
61	Tanzania	Mbeya	Mbeya Region	1,700	5,577	
63	El Salvador	Apaneca	Ahuachapán Department	1,683	5,523	
65	Djibouti	Airolaf	Tadjourah Region	1,667	5,468	
66	Canada	Lake Louise	Alberta	1,661	5,449	
67	Democratic Republic of the Congo	Masisi	North Kivu Province	1,651	5,419	
68	Zimbabwe	Marondera	Mashonaland East	1,630	5,348	
69	Brazil	Campos do Jordão	São Paulo	1,628	5,341	
70	Vietnam	Sa Pa	Lào Cai Province	1,600	5,249	
70	Bulgaria	Manastir	Plovdiv Province	1,600	5,249	Village centre at 1,460 m (4,790 ft), highest neighbourhoods reaching above 1,600 m (5,200 ft). Chamla in Smolyan Province is higher at ~1,650 m (5,410 ft), but uninhabited since the 1980s. Dospat is the highest town in Bulgaria at 1,358 m (4,455 ft), as it was upgraded to a town status in 1974.
72	Malaysia	Brinchang	Pahang	1,592	5,226	Kundasang, located in Sabah, is higher at 1,884 m (6,181 ft) but it is a small village of the town of Ranau.
73	Malawi	Dedza	Central Region	1,590	5,216	
74	Egypt	Saint Catherine	South Sinai Governorate	1,586	5,203	
75	Niger	Inignaouei	Agadez Region, Arlit Department	1,556	5,108	
76	Haiti	Kenscoff	Ouest	1,504	4,934	
77	Eswatini	Sandlane	Manzini District	1,503	4,934	
78	Philippines	Baguio	Benguet	1,500	4,921	There are towns at higher altitudes (such as Atok at 2,200 m (7,200 ft)), but Baguio is the highest with city status.
79	Uzbekistan	Yangiabad	Tashkent Province	1,500	4,921	
79	Cape Verde	Estância Roque	Fogo Island	1,500	4,921	
81	Bosnia and Herzegovina	Lukomir	Herzegovina-Neretva Canton, Konjic municipality	1,495	4,905	
82	Australia	Cabramurra	New South Wales	1,475	4,839	Highest on continent Several ski towns & villages are higher than Cabramurra. The highest town without a ski lift network is Dinner Plain at 1,570 m (5,150 ft)
83	Thailand	Ban Na Yang	Chiang Mai Province	1,467	4,816	
84	Montenegro	Žabljak	Žabljak Municipality	1,456	4,777	
85	Greece	Seli, Samarina and Aetomilitsa	Epirus and Macedonia (Greece)	1,450	4,800	
86	Guinea	Mali	Labé Region	1,441	4,712	
87	Burma	Taunggyi	Shan State	1,436	4,730	Ndūng Ngid, situated in the Wa State, is a small town at an elevation of 2,235 m (7,333 ft). Area not controlled by the Burmese government.
88	Liechtenstein	Rotenboden	Triesenberg	1,416	4,645	The center of Rotenboden is only at an elevation of 953 m (3,127 ft) according to SwissTopo. Triesenberg is the highest commune in Liechtenstein but its center is at 884 m (2,900 ft). The hamlet of Malbun (also on the territory of Triesenberg) lies even higher at 1,600 m (5,200 ft).
89	Cyprus	Prodromos	Limassol District	1,380	4,528	
90	Iraq	Penjwin	Sulaymaniyah Governorate	1,368	4,491	
91	Romania	Fundata	Brașov County	1,360	4,462	https://m.adevarul.ro/locale/brasov/fundata-cea-mai-inalta-localitate-romania-locul-oamenii-avut-gospodariile-doua-state-diferite-oficial-mai-curat-aer-tara-1_550c69f0448e03c0fdbf3202/index.html]
92	Mozambique	Lichinga	Niassa Province	1,360	4,462	
93	North Korea	Samjiyŏn	Ryanggang Province	1,356	4,452	
94	North Macedonia	Kruševo	Kruševo Municipality	1,350	4,429	Kruševo is the highest town/ city in North Macedonia. The highest settlement in North Macedonia is Plakje near Ohrid, however it only has a population of 4.
95	Turkmenistan	Hojeýpil	Lebap Province	1,346	4,416	
97	Laos	Phongsali	Phongsali Province	1,334	4,379	
98	Jordan	Shoubak	Ma'an Governorate	1,330	4,360	
99	Botswana	Kanye	Southern District	1,306	4,288	
100	Vanuatu	Nokowoula	Sanma Province, Espiritu Santo Island	1,291	4,238	
101	Zambia	Lusaka	Lusaka Province	1,279	4,196	
102	Germany	Feldberg	Baden-Württemberg	1,277	4,190	highest German village
103	Nigeria	Jos	Plateau State	1,238	4,062	
104	Norway	Finse	Western Norway	1,222	4,000	
105	Nicaragua	San José de Cusmapa	Madriz Department	1,184	3,887	
106	Dominican Republic	Constanza	La Vega Province	1,164	3,819	The highest residence situated in Constanza is at 1,330 m (4,360 ft) above sea level. Jamamucito is higher (1,410 m (4,630 ft)), but it is a small hamlet pertaining to the village of Jamamu, in the town of Las Placetas, belonging to the city of San José de las Matas.
107	Albania	Moscopole	Korçë County	1,160	3,806	
108	Sudan	Kutum	North Darfur	1,127	3,700	
109	Slovakia	Vysoké Tatry	Prešov Region	1,125	3,691	Highest elevation settlement of town Vysoké Tatry is Vyšné Hágy at 1,125 m (3,691 ft) above sea level.
110	Serbia	Nova Varoš	Zlatibor District	1,111	3,648	
111	Chad	Aouzou	Borkou-Ennedi-Tibesti Prefecture	1,074	3,526	
112	Central African Republic	Bocaranga	Ouham-Pendé	1,072	3,517	
113	Croatia	Begovo Razdolje	Primorje–Gorski Kotar County	1,060	3,478	Reference: Note: The meteorological station at Zavižan is located at an altitude of 1,594 metres (5,230 ft), and is staffed round the clock by a family from a nearby village, but is not legally considered a settlement.
114	Portugal	Guarda	Guarda District	1,056	3,464	Penhas da Saúde, Covilhã Municipality, is higher at 1,500 m (4,900 ft) but is a small village.
115	Czech Republic	Boží Dar	Karlovy Vary Region	1,028	3,372	The village of Kvilda lies at approximately 1,065 m (3,495 ft) above sea level. Bučina, which no longer exists as a village, once stood at 1,162 m (3,812 ft).
117	Tunisia	Thala	Kasserine Governorate	1,017	3,337	
118	Poland	Ząb	Lesser Poland Voivodeship	1,013	3,326	
118	Equatorial Guinea	Moka	Bioko Island	1,013	3,326	
121	São Tomé and Príncipe	M. Vilela	São Tomé Island	991	3,254	
122	Belize	Baldy Beacon	Cayo District	978	3,211	
123	Slovenia	Zgornje Jezersko	Carinthia	973	3,195	
124	Israel	Beit Jann	Northern District	940	3,084	
125	Gabon	Ndindi	Ngounié Province	932	3,061	
126	Ukraine	Yasinia	Zakarpattia Oblast, Rakhiv Raion	931	3,054	
127	Solomon Islands	Kamanjikoko	Guadalcanal Province	913	2,998	
128	Sierra Leone	Dawule	Northern Province	890	2,923	
129	Japan	Fujikawaguchiko	Minamitsuru District, Yamanashi Prefecture	875	2,874	
130	Samoa	Afiamalu	Upolu Island	863	2,834	
131	Cambodia	Phumi Popok Vil	Kampot Province	842	2,765	
132	Sweden	Högvålen	Härjedalen	835	2,739	
133	South Sudan	Torit	Eastern Equatoria	829	2,723	
134	New Zealand	National Park Village	Manawatū-Whanganui region	825	2,706	Population:174
135	Hungary	Mátraszentimre	Heves County	810	2,657	
136	Republic of the Congo	Edzouanseke	Plateaux Department	803	2,637	
137	Togo	Sadomé	Plateaux Region	798	2,621	
138	Fiji	Navai	Viti Levu	738	2,424	
140	Libya	Gharyan	Jabal al Gharbi District	700	2,296	
141	Ghana	Amedzofe	Volta Region	677	2,224	
142	San Marino	City of San Marino	Castello della Città di San Marino	675	2,215	Also the capital.
143	Trinidad and Tobago	Brasso Seco	Tunapuna–Piarco	673	2,211	
144	Liberia	Saniquellie	Nimba County	671	2,204	
145	Paraguay	Pedro Juan Caballero	Amambay	670	2,201	
146	Belgium	Rocherath	Liège	650	2,133	
146	South Korea	Taebaek	Gangwon Province	650	2,133	
148	Jamaica	Mandeville	Manchester Parish	628	2,061	
149	Saint Vincent and the Grenadines	Fancy	Saint Vincent Island	612	2,007	
150	Guyana	Ipichau	Potaro-Siparuni	611	2,004	
151	Mali	Sadegue	Mopti Region	604	1,984	
153	Ivory Coast	Biankouma	Biankouma Department	600	1,971	
154	United Arab Emirates	Masafi	Ras al-Khaimah and Fujairah	567	1,863	
156	Finland	Kilpisjärvi	Lapland	490	1,607	excursionmap.fi
157	Mauritania	Zouérat	Tiris Zemmour Region	488	1,604	
159	Federated States of Micronesia	Pwoaipwoai	Pohnpei	478	1,571	
160	Cuba	Yateras	Guantánamo Province	470	1,542	
161	Iceland	Möðrudalur	Eastern Region	469	1,539	
162	Luxembourg	Troisvierges	Clervaux	469	1,539	
163	United Kingdom	Flash	Staffordshire, England	463	1,519	Verified by Ordnance Survey
164	Burkina Faso	Diali	Cascades Region	456	1,499	
165	Saint Lucia	Migny	Soufrière Quarter	454	1,492	
166	Benin	Aledjo-Koura	Donga Department	451	1,482	
167	Mauritius	Curepipe	Plaines Wilhems District	446	1,466	
168	Suriname	Anapi	Sipaliwini District	398	1,309	
170	Grenada	Constantine	Saint George Parish	396	1,302	
172	Moldova	Bălănești	Nisporeni District	324	1,066	
173	Uruguay	Santa Clara de Olimar	Treinta y Tres Department	320	1,050	
174	Barbados	White Hill	Saint Andrew Parish	304	1,000	
175	Ireland	Glencullen	County Dublin	300	980	
177	Malta	Dingli	Malta Island, Western District	250	820	
181	Bangladesh	Rulkippara	Chittagong Division	237	780	
183	Lithuania	Švenčionys	Utena County	230	755	
184	Guinea-Bissau	Bolabá	Gabú Region	226	744	
185	Belarus	Lahojsk	Minsk Region	220	725	
186	Latvia	Alūksne	Vidzeme	217	712	List of highest towns in Latvia
188	Brunei	Rumah Supon	Tutong District	203	669	
189	Netherlands	Vaals	Limburg	198	650	
190	Tonga	Pangai	'Eua Island	184	606	
191	Kuwait	Wafra	Al Ahmadi Governorate	168	554	
193	Palau	Ngatpang	Ngatpang State, Babeldaob Island	162	534	
194	Denmark	Ejer	Region Midtjylland	160	520	
195	Senegal	Nepen Diakha	Kédougou Region	153	502	
196	Estonia	Otepää	Valga County	152	499	
202	Vatican City	Vatican City		75	246	
203	Qatar	Umm Bab	Jariyan al Batnah	68	226	
205	Bahrain	Awali	Awali Municipality	62	206	
206	The Gambia	Bani	Upper River Division, Kantora District	50	164	
207	Nauru	Uaboe	Uaboe District	35	118	
208	The Bahamas	Freeport	Grand Bahama, Freeport District	10	36	
211	Dominica	None		0	0	
211	Saint Kitts and Nevis	None		0	0	
211	Seychelles	None		0	0	
211	Antigua and Barbuda	None		0	0	
211	Singapore	None		0	0	
211	Monaco	None		0	0	
211	Kiribati	None		0	0	
211	Marshall Islands	None		0	0	
211	Tuvalu	None		0	0	
211	Maldives	None		0	0	

== Countries with disputed sovereignty ==
Rank	Country	Claimant	Town / city	Region / state	Height (m)	Height (ft)	Comment
40	South Ossetia	Georgia	Leti	Dzau District	2,179	7,152	
59	Kosovo	Serbia	Restelica	District of Prizren	1,717	5,636	
64	Taiwan	China	Ren'ai	Nantou County	1,669	5,476	
116	Abkhazia	Georgia	Pskhu	Sukhumi District	1,047	3,438	
120	Palestinian territories	Israel	Halhul	Hebron Governorate	1,004	3,297	
158	Western Sahara	Morocco	Hasi Chor	Dakhla-Oued Ed-Dahab	483	1,584	

== Dependent countries and overseas territories ==
This section includes all countries and territories that are listed by ISO 3166-1 but not listed in the above sections.

Rank	Country	Mother country	Settlement	Region / State	Height (m)	Height (ft)	Comment
95	Réunion	France	Hell-Bourg	Salazie Commune	1,344	4,412	
139	Puerto Rico	United States	Aibonito	San Juan–Caguas–Guaynabo metropolitan area	731	2,401	
152	Martinique	France	Le Morne-Vert	Le Morne-Vert Commune	601	1,975	
155	Guadeloupe	France	Saint-Claude	Saint-Claude Commune	544	1,788	
169	Saint Helena, Ascension and Tristan da Cunha	United Kingdom	Longwood	Saint Helena, Longwood District	397	1,305	
171	United States Virgin Islands	United States	Dorothea and Resolution	Saint Thomas	371	1,220	
176	American Samoa	United States	A'oloau	Tutuila	264	869	
177	Mayotte	France	Vahibé	Commune of Mamoudzou	250	820	
177	New Caledonia	France	Farino	South Province	250	820	
180	Montserrat	United Kingdom	Saint John's	Northern Zone	239	787	
182	French Guiana	France	Saül	Arrondissement of Saint-Laurent-du-Maroni	230	757	
185	Christmas Island	Australia	Drumsite		219	721	
187	Northern Mariana Islands	United States	Capitol Hill	Saipan	214	705	A settlement with no official status located within the larger municipality of Saipan. Capitol Hill is home to the territory's executive and legislative branches of government.
197	Isle of Man	United Kingdom	Foxdale	Glenfaba sheading	151	498	
198	Guam	United States	Santa Rita		131	433	
199	Aruba	Kingdom of the Netherlands	Shiribana		127	419	
201	Svalbard	Norway	Nybyen	Spitsbergen	100	300	
204	Curaçao	Netherlands	Sint Willibrordus		67	223	
208	Cayman Islands	United Kingdom	Bodden Town	Bodden Town district	10	30	
210	South Georgia and the South Sandwich Islands	United Kingdom	Grytviken	South Georgia Island	3	10	
211	French Polynesia	France	None		0	0	
211	Hong Kong	China	None		0	0	
211	Faroe Islands	Denmark	None		0	0	
211	Falkland Islands	United Kingdom	None		0	0	Claimed by Argentina
211	Cook Islands	New Zealand	None		0	0	
211	Wallis and Futuna	France	None		0	0	
211	British Virgin Islands	United Kingdom	None		0	0	
211	Gibraltar	United Kingdom	None		0	0	
211	Saint Martin	France	None		0	0	
211	Pitcairn Islands	United Kingdom	None		0	0	
211	Sint Maarten	Netherlands	None		0	0	
211	Norfolk Island	Australia	None		0	0	
211	Saint Barthélemy	France	None		0	0	
211	Saint Pierre and Miquelon	France	None		0	0	
211	Macau	China	None		0	0	
211	Jersey	United Kingdom	None		0	0	
211	Guernsey	United Kingdom	None		0	0	
211	Bermuda	United Kingdom	None		0	0	
211	Niue	New Zealand	None		0	0	
211	Anguilla	United Kingdom	None		0	0	
211	Turks and Caicos Islands	United Kingdom	None		0	0	
211	British Indian Ocean Territory	United Kingdom	None		0	0	
211	Cocos (Keeling) Islands	Australia	None		0	0	
211	Tokelau	New Zealand	None		0	0	
211	Greenland	Denmark	None		0	0	
	Antarctica	None, territorial claims	There are no towns, cities, villages or permanent settlements in Antarctica; only research stations.				

== See also ==
- Extreme points of Earth
- List of highest cities
- List of European cities by elevation
- List of South American cities by elevation
- List of highest United States cities by state
- List of capital cities by altitude
- List of countries by highest point
