= Zagalu =

Zagalu may refer to:

- Tsovak, Armenia, formerly Nizhniy Zagalu
- Akhpradzor, Armenia, formerly Verkhniy Zagalu
