= List of European cities by elevation =

This is a list of European cities by elevation, located above 500 m (1,600 ft)—divided by cities with over 10,000 people, and those with 100,000 or more. The list of those with more than 10,000 people is further divided by elevation above sea level.

== Cities over 100,000 inhabitants ==
- (Spain) Burgos 859 m (2,818 ft)
- (Spain) León 837 m (2,746 ft)
- (Russia) Kislovodsk 810 m (2,660 ft)
- (Spain) Salamanca 802 m (2,631 ft)
- (Spain) Alcorcón 718 m (2,356 ft)
- (Spain) Valladolid 698 m (2,290 ft)
- (Spain) Alcobendas 695 m (2,280 ft)
- (Russia) Vladikavkaz 692 m (2,270 ft)
- (Spain) Albacete 686 m (2,251 ft)
- (Spain) Granada 683 m (2,241 ft)
- (Spain) Madrid 667 m (2,188 ft)
- (Spain) Leganés 665 m (2,182 ft)
- (Spain) Fuenlabrada 664 m (2,178 ft)
- (Spain) Móstoles 660 m (2,170 ft)
- (Kosovo) Pristina 652 m (2,139 ft)
- (Spain) Parla 649 m (2,129 ft)
- (Spain) Getafe 623 m (2,044 ft)
- (Romania) Brașov 600 m (2,000 ft)
- (Spain) Alcalá de Henares 594 m (1,949 ft)
- (Austria) Innsbruck 574 m (1,883 ft)
- (Spain) Jaén 573 m (1,880 ft)
- (Spain) Torrejón de Ardoz 568 m (1,864 ft)
- (Bulgaria) Sofia 560 m (1,840 ft)
- (Bosnia and Herzegovina) Sarajevo 550 m (1,800 ft)
- (Switzerland) Bern 540 m (1,770 ft)
- (Germany) Munich 525 m (1,722 ft)
- (Spain) Vitoria-Gasteiz 519 m (1,703 ft)
- (France) Saint-Étienne 516 m (1,693 ft)

== Cities over 10,000 inhabitants ==
=== Over 1,000 m ===
- (Switzerland) Davos 1,560 m (5,120 ft)
- (France) Briançon 1,326 m (4,350 ft)
- (Russia) Tyrnyauz 1,307 m (4,288 ft)
- (Spain) Ávila 1,132 m (3,714 ft)
- (Spain) Soria 1,063 m (3,488 ft)
- (Portugal) Guarda 1,056 m (3,465 ft)
- (Bulgaria) Smolyan 1,050 m (3,440 ft)
- (Italy) San Giovanni in Fiore 1,049 m (3,442 ft)
- (Spain) San Lorenzo de El Escorial 1,032 m (3,386 ft)
- (Georgia (country)) Akhaltsikhe 1,029 m (3,376 ft)
- Andorra la Vella 1,023 m (3,356 ft)
- (Serbia) Sjenica 1,010 m (3,310 ft)
- (Spain) Segovia 1,002 m (3,287 ft)
- (Switzerland) La Chaux-de-Fonds 1,001 m (3,284 ft)

=== 901–1,000 m ===
- (Spain) Cuenca 999 m (3,278 ft)
- (Spain) Guadarrama 981 m (3,219 ft)
- (Spain) Moralzarzal 979 m (3,212 ft)
- (Spain) Béjar 953 m (3,127 ft)
- (Bulgaria) Samokov 950 m (3,120 ft)
- (Italy) Enna 931 m (3,054 ft)
- (Russia) Zelenchukskaya 930 m (3,050 ft)
- (Switzerland) Le Locle 920 m (3,020 ft)
- (Spain) Collado Villalba 917 m (3,009 ft)
- (Spain) Teruel 912 m (2,992 ft)
- (Spain) Guadix 910 m (2,990 ft)
- (Germany) Meßstetten 907 m (2,976 ft)
- (Russia) Karachayevsk 900 m (3,000 ft)
- (Bosnia and Herzegovina) Tomislavgrad 900 m (3,000 ft)

=== 801–900 m ===
- (Albania) Korçë 890 m (2,920 ft)
- (Spain) Colmenar Viejo 883 m (2,897 ft)
- (Switzerland) Einsiedeln 882 m (2,894 ft)
- (Spain) Astorga 868 m (2,848 ft)
- (Spain) Burgos 865 m (2,838 ft)
- (Germany) Sankt Georgen im Schwarzwald 862 m (2,828 ft)
- (Spain) Reinosa 860 m (2,820 ft)
- (Poland) Zakopane 838 m (2,749 ft)
- (Italy) Bruneck 838 m (2,749 ft)
- (Spain) León 837 m (2,746 ft)
- (Austria) Imst 827 m (2,713 ft)
- (Spain) Jaca 820 m (2,690 ft)
- (Bosnia and Herzegovina) Pale 820 m (2,690 ft)
- (France) Pontarlier 820 m (2,690 ft)
- (Italy) Potenza 819 m (2,687 ft)
- (Spain) Tarancón 818 m (2,684 ft)
- (Romania) Gheorgheni 816 m (2,677 ft)
- (Russia) Kislovodsk 810 m (2,660 ft)
- (Germany) Füssen 808 m (2,651 ft)
- (Georgia (country)) Borjomi 802 m (2,631 ft)
- (Romania) Vatra Dornei 800 m (2,600 ft)

=== 701–800 m ===
- (Spain) Aranda de Duero 798 m (2,618 ft)
- (Germany) Tailfingen 778 m (2,552 ft)
- (Bulgaria) Velingrad 777 m (2,549 ft)
- (Georgia (country)) Sagarejo 772 m (2,533 ft)
- (Switzerland) Bulle 771 m (2,530 ft)
- (Switzerland) Herisau 771 m (2,530 ft)
- (Switzerland) Val-de-Ruz 768 m (2,520 ft)
- (Romania) Sinaia 767 m (2,516 ft)
- (Italy) Randazzo 765 m (2,510 ft)
- (Montenegro) Pljevlja 761 m (2,497 ft)
- (Italy) Bronte 760 m (2,490 ft)
- (Germany) Villingen-Schwenningen 758 m (2,487 ft)
- (Bulgaria) Pernik 756 m (2,480 ft)
- (Italy) Erice 751 m (2,464 ft)
- (Italy) Mussomeli 750 m (2,460 ft)
- (Spain) Palencia 749 m (2,457 ft)
- (Austria) Saalfelden am Steinernen Meer 748 m (2,454 ft)
- (Spain) Majadahonda 743 m (2,438 ft)
- (Poland) Krynica-Zdrój 741 m (2,431 ft)
- (Germany) Sonthofen 741 m (2,431 ft)
- (Austria) Judenburg 737 m (2,418 ft)
- (Switzerland) Val-de-Travers 737 m (2,418 ft)
- (Germany) Freudenstadt 732 m (2,402 ft)
- (France) Mende 732 m (2,402 ft)
- (Germany) Albstadt, Ebingen 731 m (2,398 ft)
- (Bosnia and Herzegovina) Livno 730 m (2,400 ft)
- (Georgia (country)) Telavi 730 m (2,400 ft)
- (Germany) Immenstadt im Allgäu 729 m (2,392 ft)
- (Germany) Schongau 726 m (2,382 ft)
- (Germany) Altusried 723 m (2,372 ft)
- (Spain) Ronda 723 m (2,372 ft)
- (Germany) Burladingen 722 m (2,369 ft)
- (Spain) Medina del Campo 720 m (2,360 ft)
- (Spain) La Roda 719 m (2,359 ft)
- (Spain) Alcorcón 718 m (2,356 ft)
- (Germany) Peiting 718 m (2,356 ft)
- (Spain) Las Rozas de Madrid 718 m (2,356 ft)
- (Montenegro) Berane 717 m (2,352 ft)
- (Italy) L'Aquila 714 m (2,343 ft)
- (Spain) Tres Cantos 710 m (2,330 ft)
- (Greece) Kozani 710 m (2,330 ft)
- (Germany) Garmisch-Partenkirchen 708 m (2,323 ft)
- (Spain) Guadalajara 708 m (2,323 ft)
- (Germany) Münsingen 707 m (2,320 ft)
- (Germany) Bad Dürrheim 703 m (2,306 ft)
- (Germany) Isny 703 m (2,306 ft)
- (Greece) Kastoria 703 m (2,306 ft)
- (North Macedonia) Ohrid 703 m (2,306 ft)

=== 601–700 m ===
- (Italy) Campobasso 700 m (2,300 ft)
- (Georgia (country)) Khashuri 700 m (2,300 ft)
- (Germany) Trossingen 699 m (2,293 ft)
- (North Macedonia) Struga 698 m (2,290 ft)
- (Spain) Valladolid 698 m (2,290 ft)
- (Italy) Piazza Armerina 697 m (2,287 ft)
- (Spain) Alcorcón 695 m (2,280 ft)
- (Italy) Avezzano 695 m (2,280 ft)
- (Russia) Vladikavkaz 692 m (2,270 ft)
- (Switzerland) Brig-Glis 691 m (2,267 ft)
- (Spain) Boadilla del Monte 689 m (2,260 ft)
- (Germany) Miesbach 688 m (2,257 ft)
- (Germany) Murnau 688 m (2,257 ft)
- (Greece) Florina 687 m (2,254 ft)
- (Spain) Albacete 686 m (2,251 ft)
- (Germany) Donaueschingen 686 m (2,251 ft)
- (Spain) Granada 683 m (2,241 ft)
- (North Macedonia) Kriva Palanka 680 m (2,230 ft)
- (Germany) Lenggries 679 m (2,228 ft)
- (Germany) Kaufbeuren 678 m (2,224 ft)
- (Spain) Humanes de Madrid 677 m (2,221 ft)
- (Switzerland) St. Gallen 675 m (2,215 ft)
- (Germany) Kempten 674 m (2,211 ft)
- (Austria) Lienz 673 m (2,208 ft)
- (Slovakia) Poprad 672 m (2,205 ft)
- (Spain) San Sebastián de los Reyes 672 m (2,205 ft)
- (Kosovo) Podujevë 670 m (2,200 ft)
- (Germany) Winterberg 668 m (2,192 ft)
- (Romania) Toplița 667 m (2,188 ft)
- (Czech Republic) Aš 666 m (2,185 ft)
- (North Macedonia) Debar 665 m (2,182 ft)
- (Spain) Leganés 665 m (2,182 ft)
- (Spain) Fuenlabrada 664 m (2,178 ft)
- (Spain) Móstoles 660 m (2,170 ft)
- (Switzerland) Villars-sur-Glâne 659 m (2,162 ft)
- (Germany) Bad Tölz 658 m (2,159 ft)
- (Austria) Trofaiach 658 m (2,159 ft)
- (Spain) Brunete 656 m (2,152 ft)
- (North Macedonia) Prilep 655 m (2,149 ft)
- (Greece) Tripoli 655 m (2,149 ft)
- (Germany) Bad Wurzach 654 m (2,146 ft)
- (Germany) Leutkirch 654 m (2,146 ft)
- (Germany) Pfullendorf 654 m (2,146 ft)
- (Spain) Villanueva de la Cañada 652 m (2,139 ft)
- (Spain) Zamora 652 m (2,139 ft)
- (Spain) Parla 649 m (2,129 ft)
- (Austria) Knittelfeld 645 m (2,116 ft)
- (Italy) Rionero in Vulture 645 m (2,116 ft)
- (Germany) Tuttlingen 645 m (2,116 ft)
- (North Macedonia) Delčevo 640 m (2,100 ft)
- (Switzerland) Gossau 638 m (2,093 ft)
- (Austria) Telfs 634 m (2,080 ft)
- (Germany) Bad Wörishofen 630 m (2,070 ft)
- (France) Le Puy-en-Velay 628 m (2,060 ft)
- (Slovakia) Kežmarok 626 m (2,054 ft)
- (France) Gap 625 m (2,051 ft)
- (Portugal) Covilhã 625 m (2,051 ft)
- (Italy) San Cataldo 625 m (2,051 ft)
- (Spain) Getafe 623 m (2,044 ft)
- (Romania) Câmpulung Moldovenesc 620 m (2,030 ft)
- (Germany) Marienberg 620 m (2,030 ft)
- (North Macedonia) Kičevo 618 m (2,028 ft)
- (North Macedonia) Bitola 615 m (2,018 ft)
- (Italy) Pedara 610 m (2,000 ft)
- (Italy) Caltagirone 608 m (1,995 ft)
- (Germany) Rottweil 607 m (1,991 ft)
- (Germany) Geretsried 606 m (1,988 ft)
- (Germany) Kaufering 606 m (1,988 ft)
- (Italy) Leonforte 603 m (1,978 ft)
- (Germany) Memmingen 601 m (1,972 ft)
- (Germany) Annaberg-Buchholz 600 m (2,000 ft)
- (Romania) Brașov 600 m (2,000 ft)
- (Italy) Corleone 600 m (2,000 ft)
- (Greece) Ptolemaida 600 m (2,000 ft)
- (Azerbaijan) Quba 600 m (2,000 ft)

=== 500–600 m ===
- (Poland) Nowy Targ 598 m (1,962 ft)
- (Russia) Bakal 597 m (1,959 ft)
- (Germany) Penzberg 596 m (1,955 ft)
- (Spain) Alcalá de Henares 594 m (1,949 ft)
- (Switzerland) Chur 593 m (1,946 ft)
- (Germany) Traunstein 591 m (1,939 ft)
- (Germany) Bad Waldsee 588 m (1,929 ft)
- (Georgia (country)) Gori 588 m (1,929 ft)
- (Germany) Starnberg 588 m (1,929 ft)
- (Austria) Bludenz 587 m (1,926 ft)
- (Switzerland) Freiburg im Üechtland 587 m (1,926 ft)
- (Germany) Landsberg am Lech 587 m (1,926 ft)
- (Italy) Trecastagni 586 m (1,923 ft)
- (Germany) Höhenkirchen-Siegertsbrunn 585 m (1,919 ft)
- (Slovenia) Jesenice 585 m (1,919 ft)
- (Switzerland) Steffisburg 585 m (1,919 ft)
- (Switzerland) Ostermundigen 585 m (1,919 ft)
- (Switzerland) Worb 585 m (1,919 ft)
- (Germany) Peißenberg 584 m (1,916 ft)
- (Italy) Aosta 583 m (1,913 ft)
- (Germany) Grünwald 581 m (1,906 ft)
- (Germany) Gauting 580 m (1,900 ft)
- (Germany) Sigmaringen 580 m (1,900 ft)
- (Czech Republic) Žďár nad Sázavou 580 m (1,900 ft)
- (Czech Republic) Mariánské Lázně 578 m (1,896 ft)
- (Slovakia) Liptovský Mikuláš 577 m (1,893 ft)
- (Germany) Oberhaching 576 m (1,890 ft)
- (France) Aurillac 575 m (1,886 ft)
- (Austria) Innsbruck 574 m (1,883 ft)
- (Germany) Waldkirchen 573 m (1,880 ft)
- (Switzerland) Köniz 572 m (1,877 ft)
- (Switzerland) Wil 571 m (1,873 ft)
- (Kosovo) Ferizaj 570 m (1,870 ft)
- (Italy) Caltanissetta 568 m (1,864 ft)
- (Spain) Torrejón de Ardoz 568 m (1,864 ft)
- (Austria) St. Johann im Pongau 565 m (1,854 ft)
- (Germany) Kirchseeon 564 m (1,850 ft)
- (Switzerland) Uzwil 564 m (1,850 ft)
- (Germany) Taufkirchen 563 m (1,847 ft)
- (Germany) Weilheim 563 m (1,847 ft)
- (Germany) Selb 562 m (1,844 ft)
- (Czech Republic) Prachatice 561 m (1,841 ft)
- (Bulgaria) Sofia 560 m (1,840 ft)
- (Georgia (country)) Kaspi 560 m (1,840 ft)
- (Italy) Adrano 560 m (1,840 ft)
- (Germany) Clausthal-Zellerfeld 560 m (1,840 ft)
- (Austria) Spittal an der Drau 560 m (1,840 ft)
- (Switzerland) Thun 560 m (1,840 ft)
- (Germany) Ebersberg 558 m (1,831 ft)
- (Switzerland) Muri bei Bern 558 m (1,831 ft)
- (Switzerland) Burgdorf 557 m (1,827 ft)
- (Germany) Unterhaching 556 m (1,824 ft)
- (Germany) Wangen im Allgäu 556 m (1,824 ft)
- (Germany) Auerbach 555 m (1,821 ft)
- (Germany) Ottobrunn 555 m (1,821 ft)
- (Austria) Feldkirchen in Kärnten 554 m (1,818 ft)
- (Italy) Nuoro 554 m (1,818 ft)
- (Italy) Mazzarino 553 m (1,814 ft)
- (Germany) Neubiberg 553 m (1,814 ft)
- (Germany) Traunreut 552 m (1,811 ft)
- (Italy) Belpasso 551 m (1,808 ft)
- (Germany) Feldkirchen-Westerham 551 m (1,808 ft)
- (Germany) Gräfelfing 550 m (1,800 ft)
- (Bosnia and Herzegovina) Sarajevo 550 m (1,800 ft)
- (Germany) Münchberg 546 m (1,791 ft)
- (Sweden) Kiruna 545 m (1,788 ft)
- (Austria) Schwaz 545 m (1,788 ft)
- (Slovakia) Stará Ľubovňa 545 m (1,788 ft)
- (Austria) Bischofshofen 544 m (1,785 ft)
- (Germany) Dießen am Ammersee 544 m (1,785 ft)
- (Spain) Ponferrada 544 m (1,785 ft)
- (Germany) Haar 542 m (1,778 ft)
- (Germany) Planegg 542 m (1,778 ft)
- (Austria) Leoben 541 m (1,775 ft)
- (Switzerland) Münsingen 541 m (1,775 ft)
- (Switzerland) Bern 540 m (1,770 ft)
- (Germany) Germering 535 m (1,755 ft)
- (Germany) Puchheim 535 m (1,755 ft)
- (Switzerland) Wetzikon 535 m (1,755 ft)
- (North Macedonia) Gostivar 533 m (1,749 ft)
- (Switzerland) Siders 533 m (1,749 ft)
- (Germany) Regen 532 m (1,745 ft)
- (Greece) Grevena 530 m (1,740 ft)
- (Germany) Marktredwitz 529 m (1,736 ft)
- (Germany) Hechingen 528 m (1,732 ft)
- (Germany) Vaterstetten 528 m (1,732 ft)
- (Czech Republic) Humpolec 527 m (1,729 ft)
- (Switzerland) Ittigen 526 m (1,726 ft)
- (Czech Republic) Jihlava 525 m (1,722 ft)
- (Germany) Munich 525 m (1,722 ft)
- (France) Digne-les-Bains 524 m (1,719 ft)
- (Italy) Gubbio 522 m (1,713 ft)
- (Germany) Grafing bei München 522 m (1,713 ft)
- (Switzerland) Belp 521 m (1,709 ft)
- (Italy) Grammichele 520 m (1,710 ft)
- (Italy) Ragusa 520 m (1,710 ft)
- (Austria) Zwettl 520 m (1,710 ft)
- (Spain) Vitoria-Gasteiz 519 m (1,703 ft)
- (Germany) Balingen 517 m (1,696 ft)
- (Germany) Fürstenfeldbruck 517 m (1,696 ft)
- (Switzerland) Illnau-Effretikon 517 m (1,696 ft)
- (Germany) Königsbrunn 516 m (1,693 ft)
- (France) Saint-Étienne 516 m (1,693 ft)
- (Switzerland) Schwyz 516 m (1,693 ft)
- (Spain) Toledo 516 m (1,693 ft)
- (Switzerland) Sitten 515 m (1,690 ft)
- (Germany) Friedberg 514 m (1,686 ft)
- (Bosnia and Herzegovina) Travnik 514 m (1,686 ft)
- (Italy) Biancavilla 513 m (1,683 ft)
- (Austria) Seekirchen am Wallersee 512 m (1,680 ft)
- (Germany) Bruckmühl 511 m (1,677 ft)
- (Germany) Kirchheim 511 m (1,677 ft)
- (Germany) Markt Schwaben 509 m (1,670 ft)
- (Kosovo) Gjilan 508 m (1,667 ft)
- (Kosovo) Peja 505 m (1,657 ft)
- (Austria) Kufstein 504 m (1,654 ft)
- (Austria) Kapfenberg 502 m (1,647 ft)
- (Austria) Villach 501 m (1,644 ft)
- (Russia) Beloretsk 500 m (1,600 ft)

== See also ==
- List of cities by elevation
- List of capital cities by altitude
- List of highest towns by country
- List of South American cities by elevation
