= List of cities by elevation =

The following is a list of the world's major cities (either capitals, more than one million inhabitants or an elevation of over 1,000 m [3,300 ft]) by elevation. In addition, the country, continental region, latitude and longitude are shown for all cities listed.

While the elevation of cities may vary enormously, this list should represent a notional elevation for each city which is verifiable and reasonably acceptable for comparison. The city proper must have a population of 175,000 or higher to be on the list.

Country/territory	City name	Continental region	Latitude	Longitude	Population	Elevation (m)
India	Mumbai	Asia	N19.076090	E72.877426	19,980,000	14
Brazil	São Paulo	South America	S23.550278	W46.633889	21,650,000	799
Nepal	Pokhara	Asia	N28.2096	E83.9856	523,000	822
South Africa	Bloemfontein	Africa	S29.116667	E026.216667	747,431	1,395
Andorra	Andorra la Vella	Europe	N42.5	W1.5	22,256	1,023
China	Shanghai	Asia	N31.2304	E121.4737	26,320,000	4
Italy	Milan	Europe	N45.4625	E9.186389	1,378,689	122
Kazakhstan	Pavlodar	Asia	N52.3000	E76.950000	353,930	123
South Africa	Pretoria	Africa	S25.746111	E028.188056	2,921,488	1,339
Albania	Tirana	Europe	N41.3317	E019.8172	557,422	110
Austria	Vienna	Europe	N48.2092	E016.3728	1,899,055	170
Belarus	Minsk	Europe	N53.9678	E027.5766	1,982,444	198
Belgium	Brussels	Europe	N50.8371	E004.3676	1,191,604	13
Bosnia and Herzegovina	Sarajevo	Europe	N43.8608	E018.4214		577
Bulgaria	Sofia	Europe	N42.7105	E023.3238	1,236,047	591
Canada	Calgary	Americas	N51.0500	W114.0667	1,306,784	1,045
Croatia	Zagreb	Europe	N45.8150	E015.9785	792,324	130
Czech Republic	Prague	Europe	N50.0878	E014.4205		244
Denmark	Copenhagen	Europe	N55.6763	E012.5681	583,348	10
Estonia	Tallinn	Europe	N59.4389	E024.7545		37
Finland	Helsinki	Europe	N60.1699	E024.9384		25
France	Paris	Europe	N48.8567	E002.3510		34
Germany	Berlin	Europe	N52.5235	E013.4115		34
Germany	Munich	Europe	N48.1351	E011.5820		520
Greece	Athens	Europe	N37.9792	E023.7166		153
Hungary	Budapest	Europe	N47.4984	E019.0408		102
Ireland	Dublin	Europe	N53.3441	W006.2675		8
Italy	Rome	Europe	N41.8955	E012.4823		14
Georgia	Tbilisi	Europe	N41.7010	E044.7930		451
Kosovo	Pristina	Europe	N42.6740	E021.1788		652
Latvia	Riga	Europe	N56.9465	E024.1049		8
Lithuania	Vilnius	Europe	N54.6896	E025.2799		124
Moldova	Chișinău	Europe	N47.0167	E028.8497		80
Montenegro	Podgorica	Europe	N42.4602	E019.2595		61
Netherlands	Amsterdam	Europe	N52.3738	E004.8910		-2
Norway	Oslo	Europe	N59.9138	E010.7387		12
Poland	Warsaw	Europe	N52.2297	E021.0122		93
Portugal	Lisbon	Europe	N38.7072	W009.1355		15
North Macedonia	Skopje	Europe	N42.0024	E021.4361		243
Romania	Bucharest	Europe	N44.4479	E026.0979		70
Russia	Moscow	Europe	N55.7558	E037.6176		124
Serbia	Belgrade	Europe	N44.8048	E020.4781		116
Slovakia	Bratislava	Europe	N48.2116	E017.1547		131
Slovenia	Ljubljana	Europe	N46.0514	E014.5060		281
Spain	Madrid	Europe	N40.4167	W003.7033		667
Sweden	Stockholm	Europe	N59.3328	E018.0645		15
Switzerland	Bern	Europe	N46.9480	E007.4481		513
Switzerland	Zurich	Europe	N47.22	E008.32	415,367	871
Ukraine	Kyiv	Europe	N50.4422	E030.5367		168
United Kingdom	London	Europe	N51.5002	W000.1262		14
Afghanistan	Kabul	Asia	N34.5155	E069.1952	3,678,034	1,807
Armenia	Yerevan	Asia	N40.1596	E044.5090		1,032
Azerbaijan	Baku	Asia	N40.3953	E049.8822		-28
Bangladesh	Dhaka	Asia	N23.7106	E090.3978		3
Myanmar	Pyinmana	Asia	N19.7378	E096.2083		77
Cambodia	Phnom Penh	Asia	N11.5434	E104.8984		15
China	Beijing	Asia	N39.9056	E116.3958		63
China	Kunming	Asia	N25.04	E102.41	6,626,000	1,892
India	Bangalore	Asia	N12.97	E77.59	8,430,000	920
India	Chennai	Asia	N13.0827	E80.2707	7,088,000	6
India	Darjeeling	Asia	N27.036007	E88.262672	166,000	2,045
India	Hyderabad	Asia	N17.37	E78.48	6,809,970	542
India	New Delhi	Asia	N28.6353	E077.2250		210
India	Shimla	Asia	N31.10442	E077.16662	238,000	2,206
India	Srinagar	Asia	N34.0837	E074.7973	1,192,792	1,585
Indonesia	Jakarta	Asia	S06.1862	E106.8063		3
Iran	Tehran	Asia	N35.7117	E051.4070	8,693,706	1,235
Iran	Shiraz	Asia	N29.61031	E052.53113		1,585
Iraq	Baghdad	Asia	N33.3157	E044.3922		40
Israel	Jerusalem	Asia	N31.7857	E035.2007	865,721	754
Japan	Tokyo	Asia	N35.6785	E139.6823	9,272,565	17
Jordan	Amman	Asia	N34.11	E021.41		1,094
Kazakhstan	Astana	Asia	N51.1796	E071.4475		338
Kuwait	Kuwait City	Asia	N29.3721	E047.9824		5
Kyrgyzstan	Bishkek	Asia	N42.8679	E074.5984		771
Laos	Vientiane	Asia	N17.9689	E102.6137		148
Lebanon	Beirut	Asia	N33.8872	E035.5134		55
Malaysia	Kuala Lumpur	Asia	N03.1502	E101.7077		60
Mongolia	Ulan Bator	Asia	N47.9138	E106.9220		1,284
Nepal	Kathmandu	Asia	N27.7058	E085.3157		1,298
North Korea	Pyongyang	Asia	N39.0187	E125.7468		6
Oman	Muscat	Asia	N23.6086	E058.5922		68
Pakistan	Islamabad	Asia	N33.6751	E073.0946	2,001,579	587
Pakistan	Abbottabad	Asia	N34.1415	E073.2136	234,395	1256
Philippines	Baguio	Asia	N16.42	E120.60	345,366	1,540
Philippines	Manila	Asia	N14.5790	E120.9726	12,877,253	7
Qatar	Doha	Asia	N25.2948	E051.5082		13
Saudi Arabia	Riyadh	Asia	N24.6748	E046.6977		624
Singapore		Asia	N01.2894	E103.8500	6,110,200	0
South Korea	Seoul	Asia	N37.5139	E126.9828		33
Sri Lanka	Colombo	Asia	N06.9155	E079.8572		4
Syria	Damascus	Asia	N33.5158	E036.2939		691
Taiwan	Taipei	Asia	N25.0338	E121.5645		5
Tajikistan	Dushanbe	Asia	N38.5737	E068.7738		789
Thailand	Bangkok	Asia	N13.7573	E100.5020		1
China	Lhasa	Asia	N29.3900	E091.0700	223,001	3,490
East Timor	Dili	Asia	S08.5662	E125.5880		11
Turkey	Ankara	Asia	N39.9439	E032.8560		938
Turkmenistan	Ashgabat	Asia	N37.9509	E058.3794		215
United Arab Emirates	Abu Dhabi	Asia	N24.4764	E054.3705		13
Uzbekistan	Tashkent	Asia	N41.3193	E069.2481		459
Vietnam	Da Lat	Asia	N11.941667	E108.438333	305,509	1,500
Vietnam	Hanoi	Asia	N21.0341	E105.8372		25
Yemen	Sanaa	Asia	N15.3556	E044.2081	1,937,451	2,253
Argentina	Buenos Aires	Americas	S34.6118	W058.4173		10
Bahamas	Nassau	Americas	N25.0661	W077.3390		2
Bolivia	La Paz	Americas	S16.500	W68.150	877,363	3,812
Brazil	Brasília	Americas	S15.7801	W47.9292	4,291,577	1,079
Chile	Santiago	Americas	S33.4691	W070.6420		521
Colombia	Tunja	Americas	N05.5353	W073.3678	188,945	2,782
Colombia	Bogotá	Americas	N04.6473	W074.0962	7,878,783	2,619
Colombia	Medellín	Americas	N06.2308	W075.5906	2,569,007	1,495
Colombia	Cali	Americas	N03.4206	W076.5222	2,252,616	1,018
Colombia	Pereira	Americas	N04.8143	W075.6946	481,768	1,411
Colombia	Ibagué	Americas	N04.4333	W075.2533	492,554	1,285
Colombia	Bello	Americas	N06.3333	W075.7667	495,483	1,310
Colombia	Pasto	Americas	N01.2078	W077.2772	308,095	2,527
Colombia	Manizales	Americas	N05.1	W075.55	405,234	2,160
Colombia	Armenia	Americas	N04.53	W075.68	304,314	1,551
Colombia	Soacha	Americas	N04.5872	W074.2214	660,179	2,565
Colombia	Itagüí	Americas	N06.1726	W075.6096	276,744	1,550
Colombia	Palmira	Americas	N03.5833	W076.25	354,285	1,001
Colombia	Popayán	Americas	N02.4542	W076.6092	318,059	1,760
Colombia	Dosquebradas	Americas	N04.8333	W075.6833	225,540	1,460
Colombia	Piedecuesta	Americas	N07.0833	W073.0	182,959	1,005
Peru	Juliaca	Americas	N15.4833	W070.1333	273,882	3,825
Peru	Huancayo	Americas	N12.0667	W075.2167	456,250	3,259
Peru	Arequipa	Americas	N16.4	W071.5333	1,008,290	2,335
Peru	Huanuco	Americas	N09.9294	W076.2397	196,627	1,880
Peru	Cajamarca	Americas	N07.1667	W078.5167	201,329	2,750
Costa Rica	San José	Americas	N09.9402	W084.1002		1,146
Cuba	Havana	Americas	N23.1333	W082.3667		4
Dominican Republic	Santo Domingo	Americas	N18.4790	W069.8908		0
Ecuador	Quito	Americas	S00.2295	W078.5243	1,763,275	2,850
Ecuador	Cuenca	Americas	N04.8143	W075.6946	596,101	2,560
Ecuador	Ambato	Americas	N01.2417	W078.6197	177,316	2,577
Ecuador	Riobamba	Americas	N01.6731	W078.6483	177,213	2,754
United States	Salt Lake City	Americas	N40.7608	W111.8911	200,133	1,300
Bolivia	Cochabamba	Americas	S17.3883	W066.1597	481,768	2,621
Bolivia	Sucre	Americas	N19.0475	W065.26	360,544	2,790
Bolivia	Oruro	Americas	N17.9667	W067.1167	351,802	3,735
Bolivia	Potosí	Americas	N19.5892	W065.7533	264,402	4,090
El Salvador	San Salvador	Americas	N13.7034	W089.2073		658
Guatemala	Guatemala City	Americas	N14.6248	W090.5328		1,529
Haiti	Port-au-Prince	Americas	N18.5392	W072.3288		98
Honduras	Tegucigalpa	Americas	N14.0821	W087.2063		980
Jamaica	Kingston	Americas	N17.9927	W076.7920		53
Mexico	Mexico City	Americas	N19.4271	W099.1276	8,918,653	2,216
Mexico	Toluca	Americas	N19.2925	W099.6569	2,202,886	2,660
Mexico	Guadalajara	Americas	N20.6767	W103.3475	1,385,629	1,566
Mexico	Puebla	Americas	N19.0333	W98.1833	1,692,181	2,135
Mexico	Ciudad Nezahualcóyotl	Americas	N19.4	W98.9889	1,072,676	2,220
Mexico	Zapopan	Americas	N20.7167	W103.4	1,476,491	1,571
Mexico	Ciudad Juárez	Americas	N31.7386	W106.487	2,143,539	1,140
Mexico	León	Americas	N21.1167	W101.6833	1,721,199	1,815
Mexico	Ecatepec de Morelos	Americas	N19.6097	W99.06	1,645,352	2,250
Mexico	Chihuahua	Americas	N28.633	W106.0691	925,762	1,415
Mexico	Naucalpan	Americas	N19.4833	W99.2333	911,168	2,300
Mexico	Saltillo	Americas	N25.4232	W101.0053	864,431	1,600
Mexico	Aguascalientes	Americas	N21.8853	W102.2916	1,425,607	1,888
Mexico	San Luis Potosí	Americas	N22.1948	W100.9792	845,941	1,864
Mexico	Querétaro	Americas	N15.8375	W92.7577	794,789	1,864
Mexico	Morelia	Americas	N19.7006	W101.1864	743,275	1,920
Mexico	Chimalhuacán	Americas	N19.4208	W98.949	703,215	2,240
Mexico	Torreón	Americas	N25.5439	W103.419	690,193	1,120
Mexico	Tlalnepantla	Americas	N19.5345	W99.1907	658,907	2,060
Mexico	Tlaquepaque	Americas	N20.65	W103.3167	650,123	1,870
Mexico	Durango	Americas	N24.0203	W104.6576	616,068	1,890
Mexico	Cuautitlán Izcalli	Americas	N19.6454	W99.216	555,163	2,280
Mexico	Ciudad López Mateos	Americas	N19.5579	W99.2568	523,065	2,280
Mexico	Irapuato	Americas	N20.6841	W101.3511	452,090	1,724
Mexico	Xalapa	Americas	N19.5312	W96.9159	443,063	1,417
Mexico	Tonalá	Americas	N16.0898	W93.7549	442,440	1,528
Mexico	Xico	Americas	N19.2917	W98.9389	384,327	1,297
Mexico	Celaya	Americas	N20.5222	W100.8122	378,143	1,767
Mexico	Ixtapaluca	Americas	N19.3186	W98.8822	368,585	2,250
Mexico	Cuernavaca	Americas	N18.9186	W99.2342	341,029	1,510
Mexico	Ciudad Nicolás Romero	Americas	N19.5833	W99.367	323,545	2,390
Mexico	La Soledad	Americas	N22.1833	W100.9333	310,192	1,849
Mexico	Gómez Palacio	Americas	N25.5611	W103.4983	301,742	1,132
Mexico	Uruapan	Americas	N19.4208	W102.0628	299,523	1,620
Mexico	Pachuca	Americas	N20.1	W98.75	297,848	2,432
Mexico	Tehuacán	Americas	N18.4617	W97.3928	293,825	1,600
Mexico	San Francisco Coacalco	Americas	N19.6345	W99.1005	293,245	2,257
Mexico	Heroica Nogales	Americas	N31.3186	W110.9458	261,137	1,199
Mexico	Oaxaca City	Americas	N17.0606	W96.7253	258,913	1,555
Mexico	Chilpancingo	Americas	N17.55	W99.5	225,728	1,253
Mexico	Buenavista	Americas	N19.6803	W99.1694	216,776	2,233
Mexico	Chicoloapan de Juárez	Americas	N19.4153	W98.9011	193,532	2,250
Mexico	San Cristóbal de las Casas	Americas	N16.7367	W92.383	183,509	2,200
Mexico	San Juan del Río	Americas	N20.3833	W99.9833	177,719	1,920
Nicaragua	Managua	Americas	N12.1475	W086.2734		75
Panama	Panama City	Americas	N08.9943	W079.5188		0
Paraguay	Asunción	Americas	S25.3005	W057.6362		54
Bolivia	El Alto	Americas	S16.517	W68.167	1,185,000	4,100
Peru	Cusco	Americas	S13.5250	W071.9722	435,114	3,399
Peru	Lima	Americas	S12.0931	W077.0465		107
Suriname	Paramaribo	Americas	N05.8232	W055.1679		1
United States	Albuquerque	Americas	N35°06′39″	W106°36′36″	558,545	1,619
United States	Colorado Springs	Americas	N38.8339	W104.8253	478,961	1,839
United States	Denver	Americas	N39.45	W104.52	713,252	1,609
United States	Washington D.C.	Americas	N38.8921	W077.0241	671,803	2
Uruguay	Montevideo	Americas	S34.8941	W056.0675		43
Venezuela	Caracas	Americas	N10.4961	W066.8983	3,242,000	900
Venezuela	Mérida	Americas	N8.5833	W071.1333	330,287	1,630
Venezuela	Nuestra Señora del Rosario de Baruta	Americas	N10.4322	W066.8739	244,216	1,002
Venezuela	Mucumpiz	Americas	N10.4322	W066.8739	215,259	1,993
Algeria	Algiers	Africa	N36.7755	E003.0597		0
Angola	Luanda	Africa	S08.8159	E013.2306		6
Benin	Porto-Novo	Africa	N06.4779	E002.6323		38
Botswana	Gaborone	Africa	S24.6570	E025.9089		1,014
Burkina Faso	Ouagadougou	Africa	N12.3569	W001.5352		305
Burundi	Bujumbura	Africa	S03.3818	E029.3622		794
Cameroon	Yaoundé	Africa	N03.8612	E011.5217		726
Central African Republic	Bangui	Africa	N40.3621	E018.5873		369
Chad	N'Djamena	Africa	N12.1121	E015.0355		298
Republic of Congo	Brazzaville	Africa	S04.2767	E015.2662		155
Democratic Republic of Congo	Kinshasa	Africa	S04.3369	E015.3271		240
Djibouti	Djibouti City	Africa	N11.5806	E043.1425		0
Egypt	Cairo	Africa	N30.0571	E031.2272		22
Eritrea	Asmara	Africa	N15.3315	E038.9183	649,000	2,363
Ethiopia	Addis Ababa	Africa	N09.0084	E038.7575	3,384,569	2,362
Gabon	Libreville	Africa	N00.3858	E009.4496		0
Gambia	Banjul	Africa	N13.4399	W016.6775		0
Ghana	Accra	Africa	N05.5401	W000.2074		98
Guinea	Conakry	Africa	N09.5370	W013.6785		0
Guinea-Bissau	Bissau	Africa	N11.8598	W015.5875		0
Ivory Coast	Yamoussoukro	Africa	N06.8067	W005.2728		217
Kenya	Nairobi	Africa	S01.2762	E036.7965	3,138,369	1,728
Lesotho	Maseru	Africa	S29.2976	E027.4854	227,880	1,673
Liberia	Monrovia	Africa	N06.3106	W010.8047		0
Libya	Tripoli	Africa	N32.8830	E013.1897		6
Madagascar	Antananarivo	Africa	S18.9201	E047.5237		1,288
Malawi	Lilongwe	Africa	S13.9899	E033.7703		1,024
Mali	Bamako	Africa	N12.6530	W007.9864		349
Mauritania	Nouakchott	Africa	N18.0669	W015.9900		6
Mauritius	Port Louis	Africa	S20.1654	E057.4896		134
Morocco	Rabat	Africa	N33.9905	W006.8704		53
Mozambique	Maputo	Africa	S25.9686	E032.5804		63
Namibia	Windhoek	Africa	S22.5749	E017.0805	325,858	1,655
Niger	Niamey	Africa	N13.5164	E002.1157		207
Nigeria	Abuja	Africa	N09.0580	E007.4891		777
Rwanda	Kigali	Africa	S01.9441	E030.0619		1,567
São Tomé and Príncipe	São Tomé	Africa	N00.3360	E006.7311		141
Senegal	Dakar	Africa	N14.6953	W017.4439		37
Sierra Leone	Freetown	Africa	N08.4697	W013.2659		76
Somalia	Mogadishu	Africa	N02.0411	E045.3426		28
South Africa	Johannesburg	Africa	S26.2044	E028.0456	9,616,000	1,753
Sudan	Khartoum	Africa	N15.6331	E032.5330		377
Tanzania	Dodoma	Africa	S06.1670	E035.7497		1,148
Togo	Lomé	Africa	N06.1228	E001.2255		63
Tunisia	Tunis	Africa	N36.8117	E010.1761		0
Uganda	Kampala	Africa	N00.3133	E032.5714		1,202
Zambia	Lusaka	Africa	S15.4145	E028.2809		1,270
Zimbabwe	Harare	Africa	S17.8227	E031.0496		1,480
Western Sahara (MA)	Laayoune	Africa	N27.1536	W013.2033		72
Australia	Canberra	Oceania	S35.2820	E149.1286		605
New Zealand	Wellington	Oceania	S41.2865	E174.7762		20
Papua New Guinea	Port Moresby	Oceania	S09.4656	E147.1969		39
Vietnam	Ho Chi Minh City	Asia	N10.8231	E106.6297	8,637,000	19

== See also ==
- Elevation
- List of capital cities by altitude
- List of highest large cities in the world
- List of highest towns by country
- List of European cities by elevation
- List of metropolitan areas by population
- World's largest municipalities by population
- List of national capitals
- List of towns
- Lists of neighborhoods by city
- List of towns and cities with 100,000 or more inhabitants
