= List of South American cities by elevation =

Ranked	Town / City	Country	Height (m)	Height (ft)	Comments
1	La Rinconada	Peru	5101	16728	Highest city in the world, 30,000 inhabitants.
2	Parinacota	Chile	4400	14435	Highest settlement in Chile.
3	Mina Pirquitas	Argentina	4340	14240	Highest settlement in Argentina.
4	Cerro de Pasco	Peru	4330	14232	Highest city of over 50,000 inhabitants (70,000).
5	Colquechaca	Bolivia	4170	13680	Highest town in Bolivia.
6	El Alto	Bolivia	4150	13615	
7	Potosí	Bolivia	4090	13420	
8	Viacha	Bolivia	3871	12700	
9	Juliaca	Peru	3824	12546	
10	Puno	Peru	3819	12530	
11	La Oroya	Peru	3745	12287	
12	Oruro	Bolivia	3706	12158	
13	Huancavelica	Peru	3676	12060	
14	La Paz	Bolivia	3690	11975	Highest capital in the world
15	Sicuani	Peru	3548	11640	
16	Apartaderos	Venezuela	3505	11502	Highest town in Venezuela. 3,360 m. according to Google Maps.
17	Cusco	Peru	3399	11151	
18	Vetas	Colombia	3350	10990	Highest town in Colombia. 3,230 m. according to Google Maps.
19	Papallacta	Ecuador	3300	10826	Highest town in Ecuador. According to other sources is Zumbahua at 3,510 m.
20	Huancayo	Peru	3259	10659	
21	Tarma	Peru	3053	10016	
22	Huaraz	Peru	3052	10006	
23	Tulcán	Ecuador	2980	9776	
24	Andahuaylas	Peru	2926	9599	
25	Ipiales	Colombia	2898	9507	
26	Quito	Ecuador	2850	9350	
27	Tunja	Colombia	2820	9310	
28	Ayacucho	Peru	2761	9058	
29	Riobamba	Ecuador	2754	9035	
30	Cajamarca	Peru	2750	9022	
31	Latacunga	Ecuador	2750	9022	
32	Sucre	Bolivia	2750	9022	
33	Bogotá	Colombia	2640	8661	
34	Duitama	Colombia	2590	8497	
35	Ambato	Ecuador	2577	8454	
36	Cochabamba	Bolivia	2574	8445	
37	Sogamoso	Colombia	2569	8428	
38	Cuenca	Ecuador	2560	8398	
39	Chiquinquirá	Colombia	2556	8386	
40	San Juan de Pasto	Colombia	2527	8290	

== See also ==
- List of highest towns by country
- List of European cities by elevation
