= Jamamucito =

- Location within the Dominican Republic
- Coordinates: 19°08′41″N 70°57′07″W
- Country: Dominican Republic
- Province: Santiago
- Municipality: San José de las Matas
- Municipal District: Las Placetas
- Village: Jamamu
- Elevation: 1,410 m (4,630 ft)

Jamamucito is a hamlet pertaining to the village of Jamamu, in the town of Las Placetas, belonging to the city of San José de las Matas, in the Santiago province of the Dominican Republic. Located at 1410 meters, it is the highest populated place in the country.
