= List of capital cities by elevation =

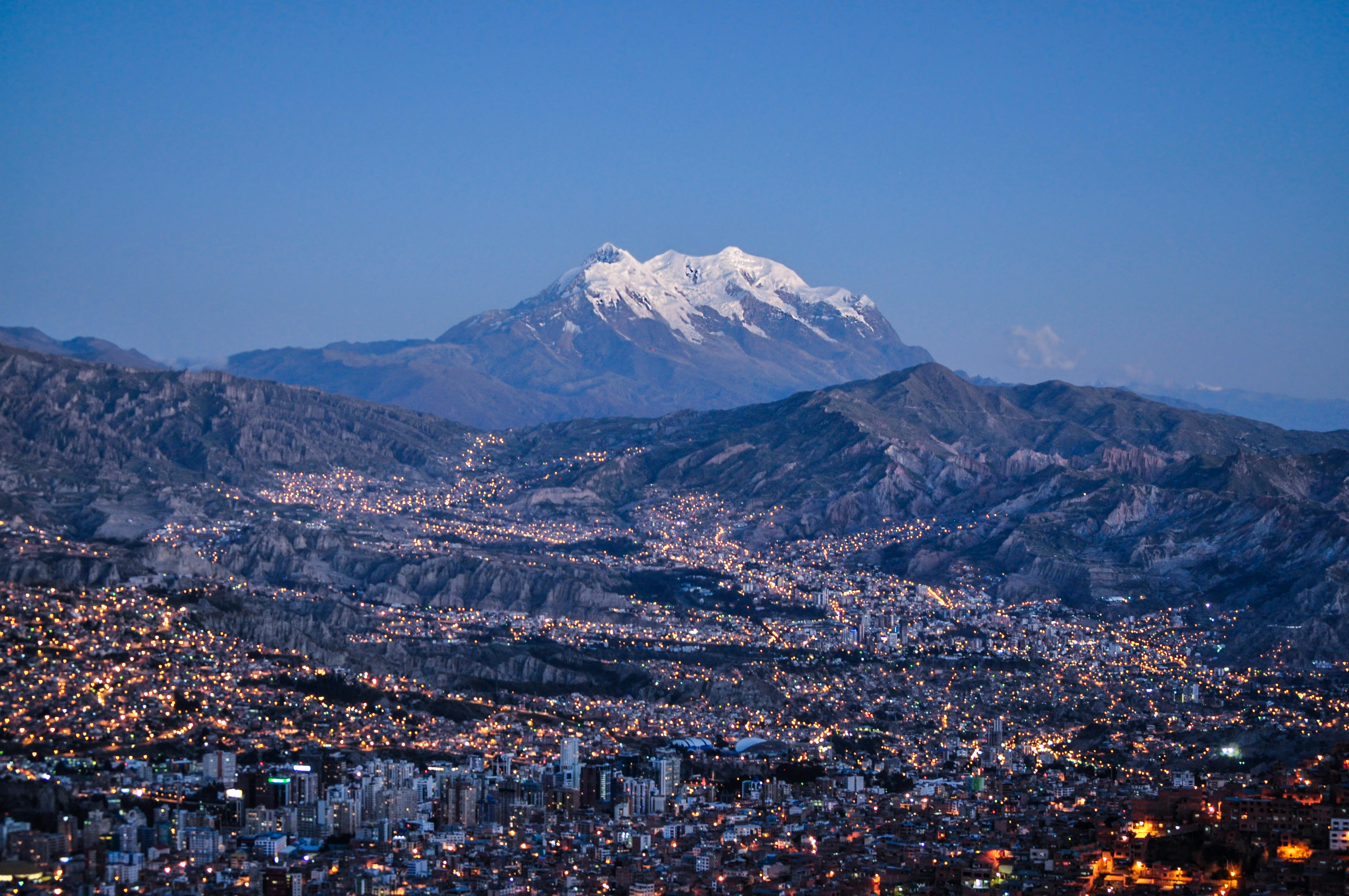
La Paz, Bolivia

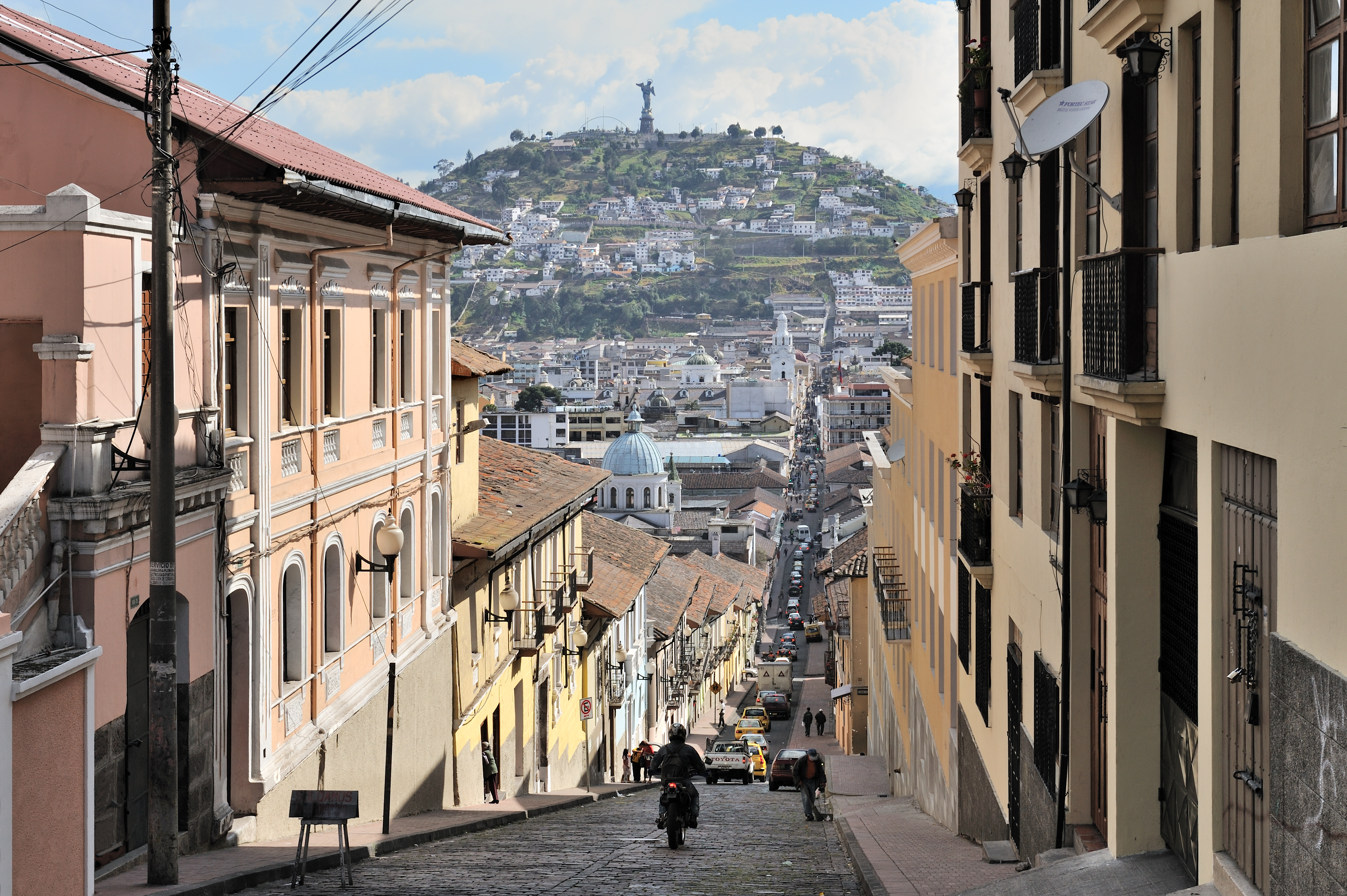
Quito, Ecuador

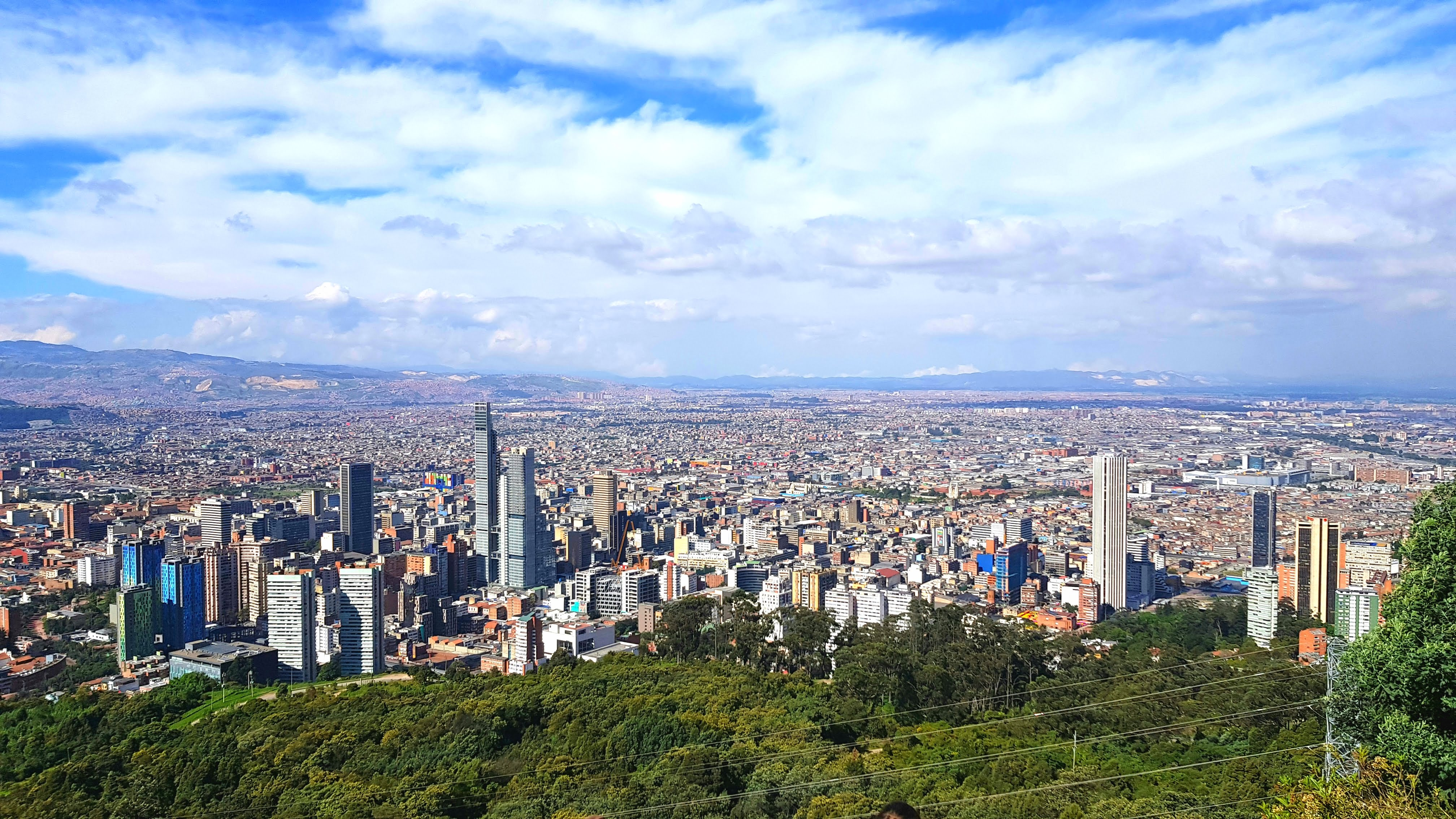
Bogotá, Colombia

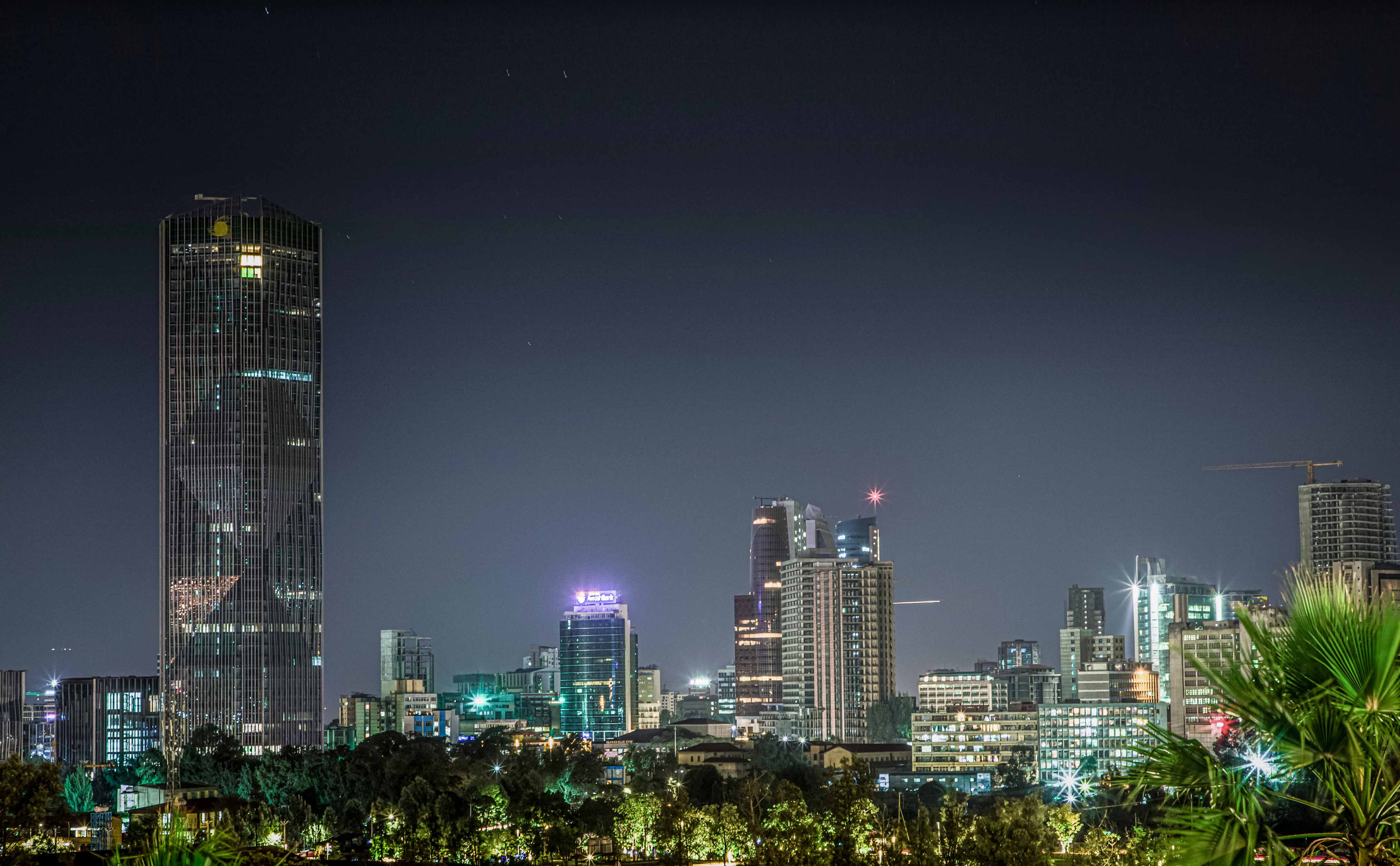
Addis Ababa, Ethiopia

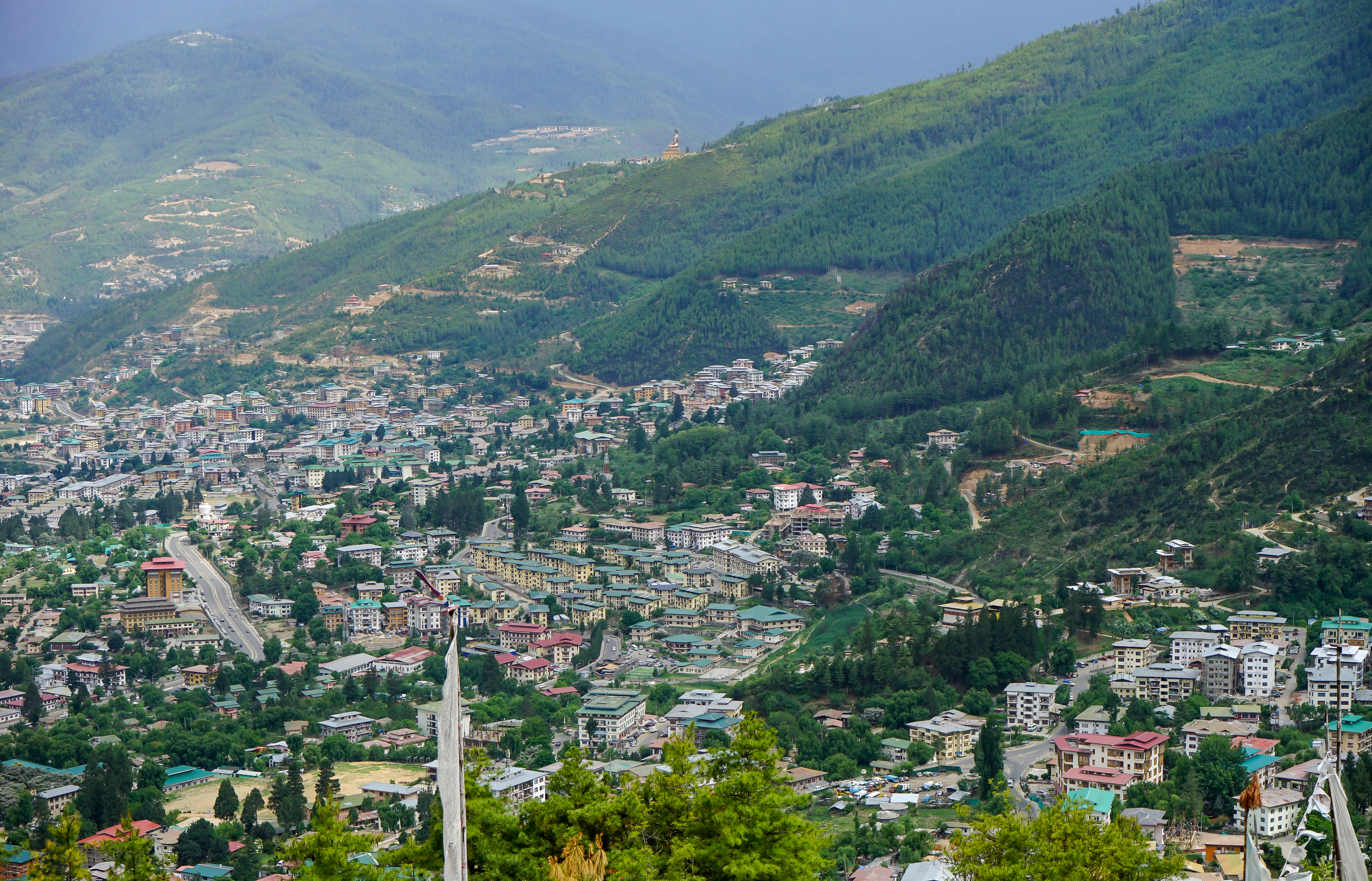
Thimphu, Bhutan

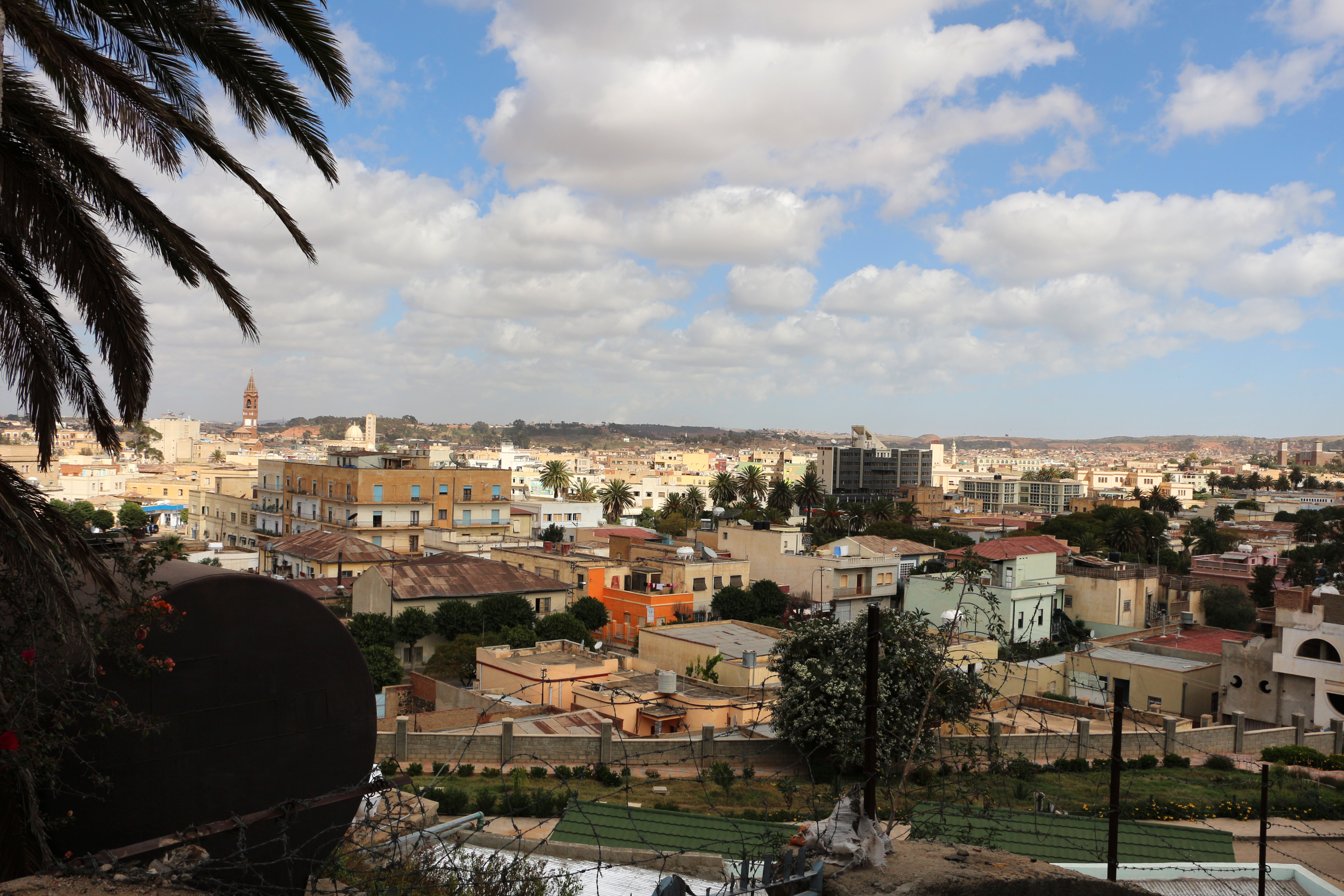
Asmara, Eritrea

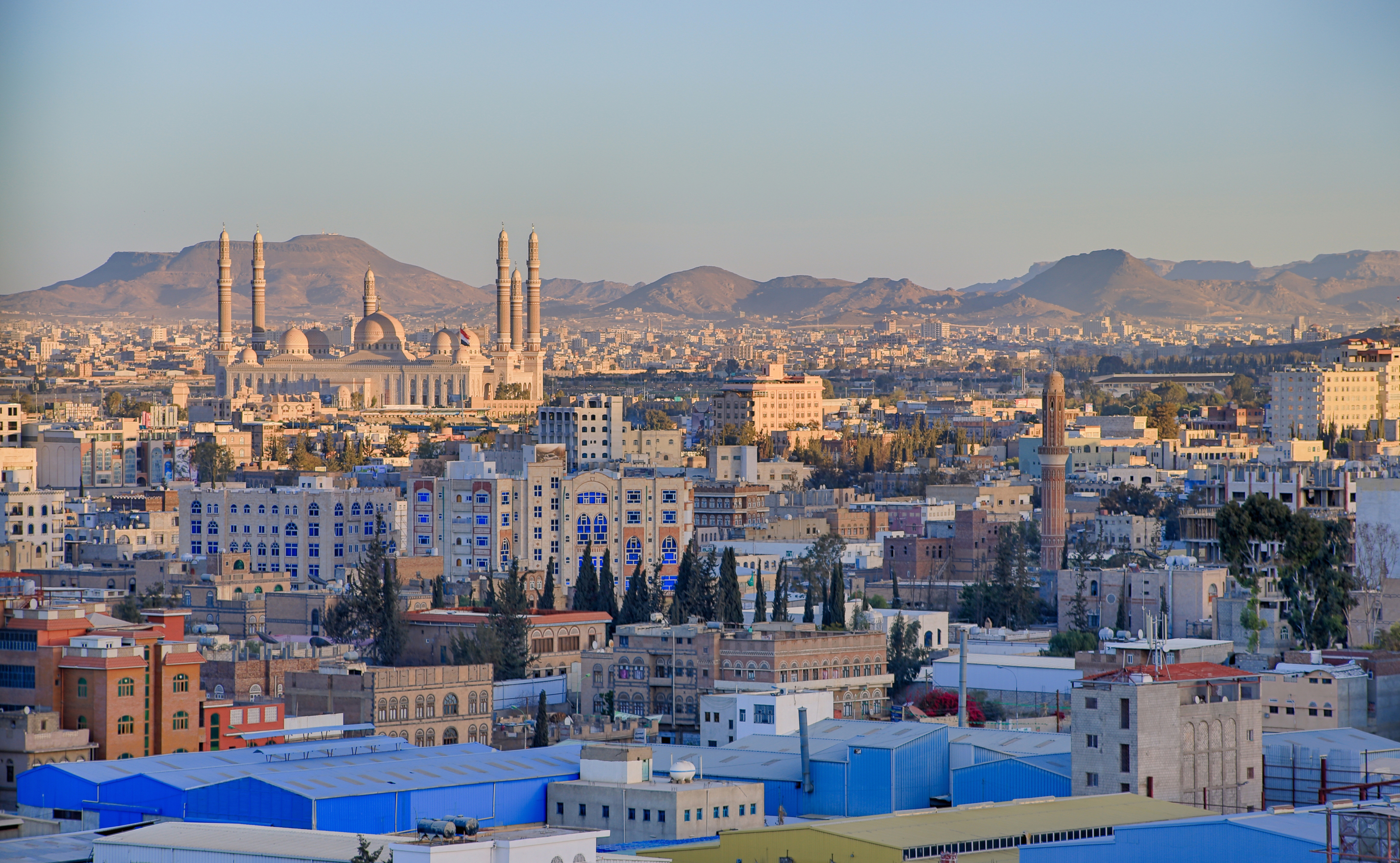
Sanaa, Yemen

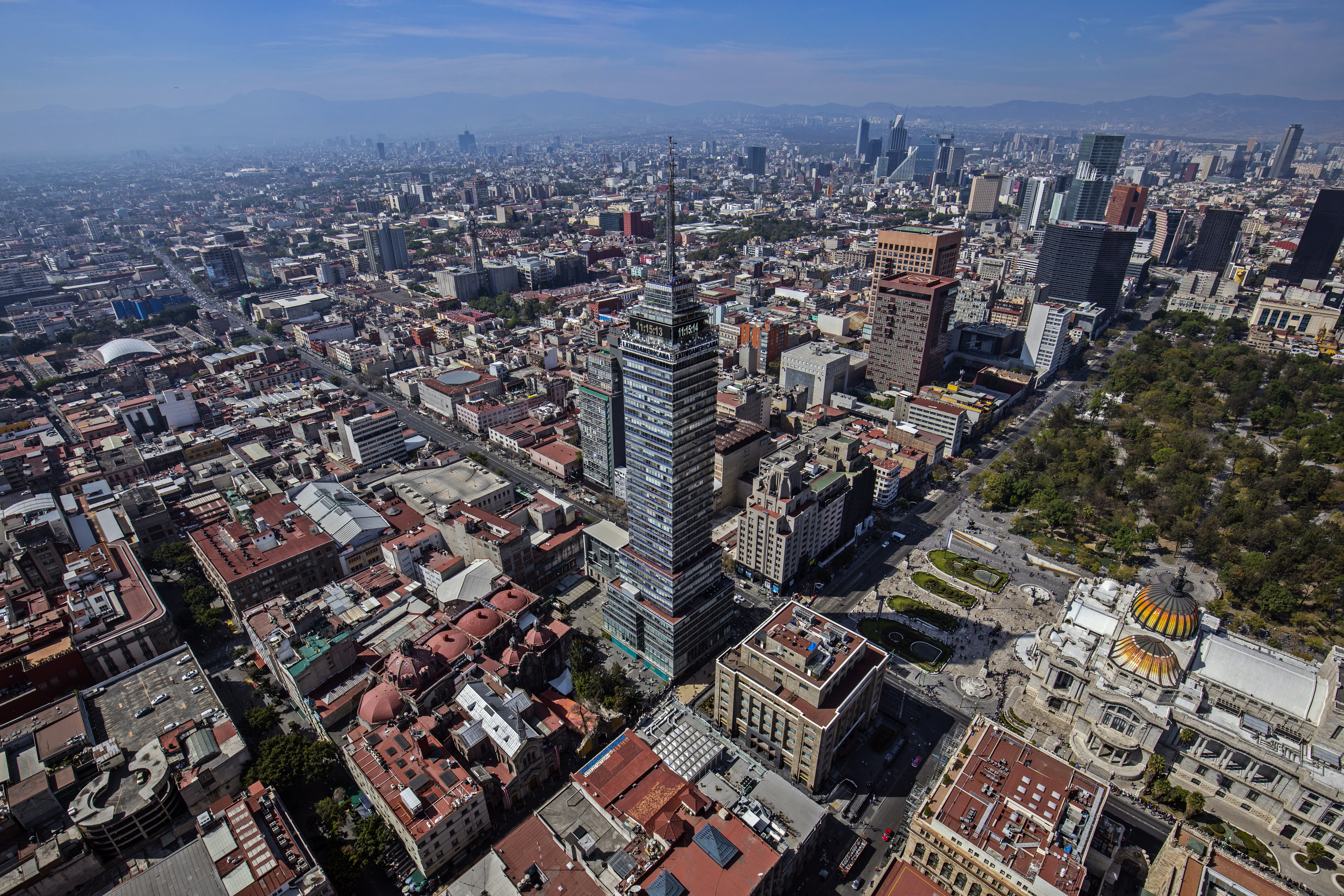
Mexico City, Mexico

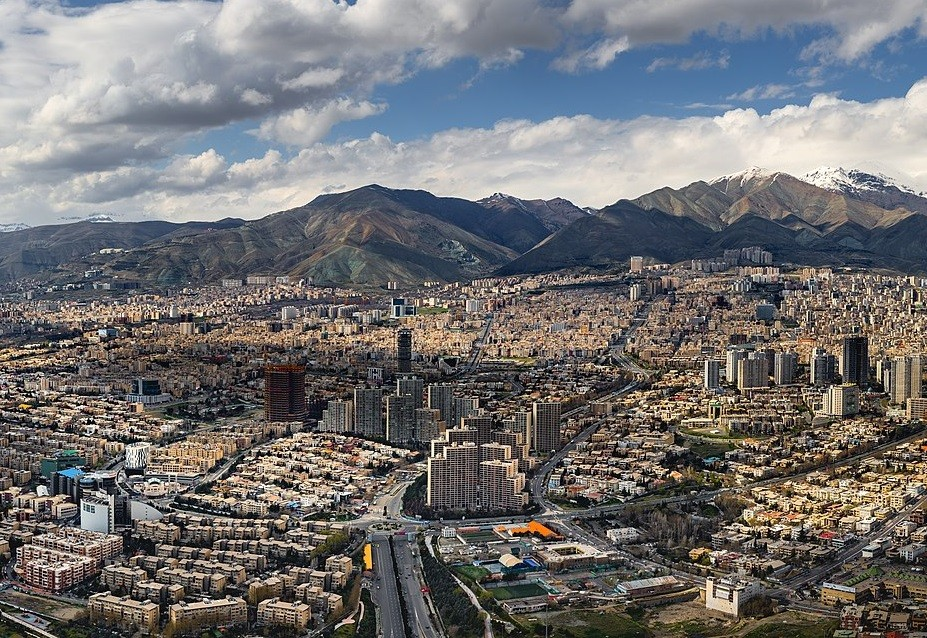
Tehran, Iran

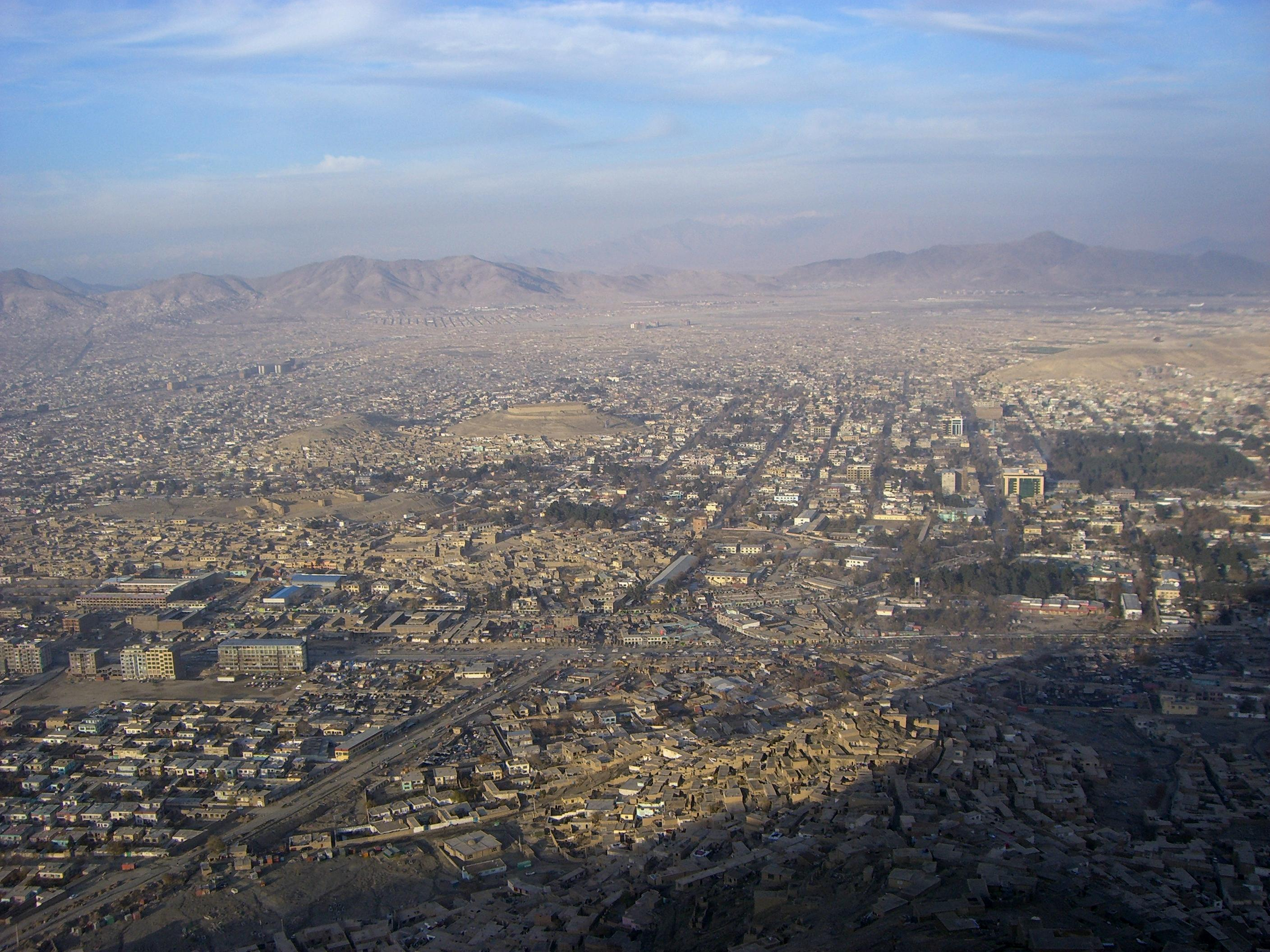
Kabul, Afghanistan

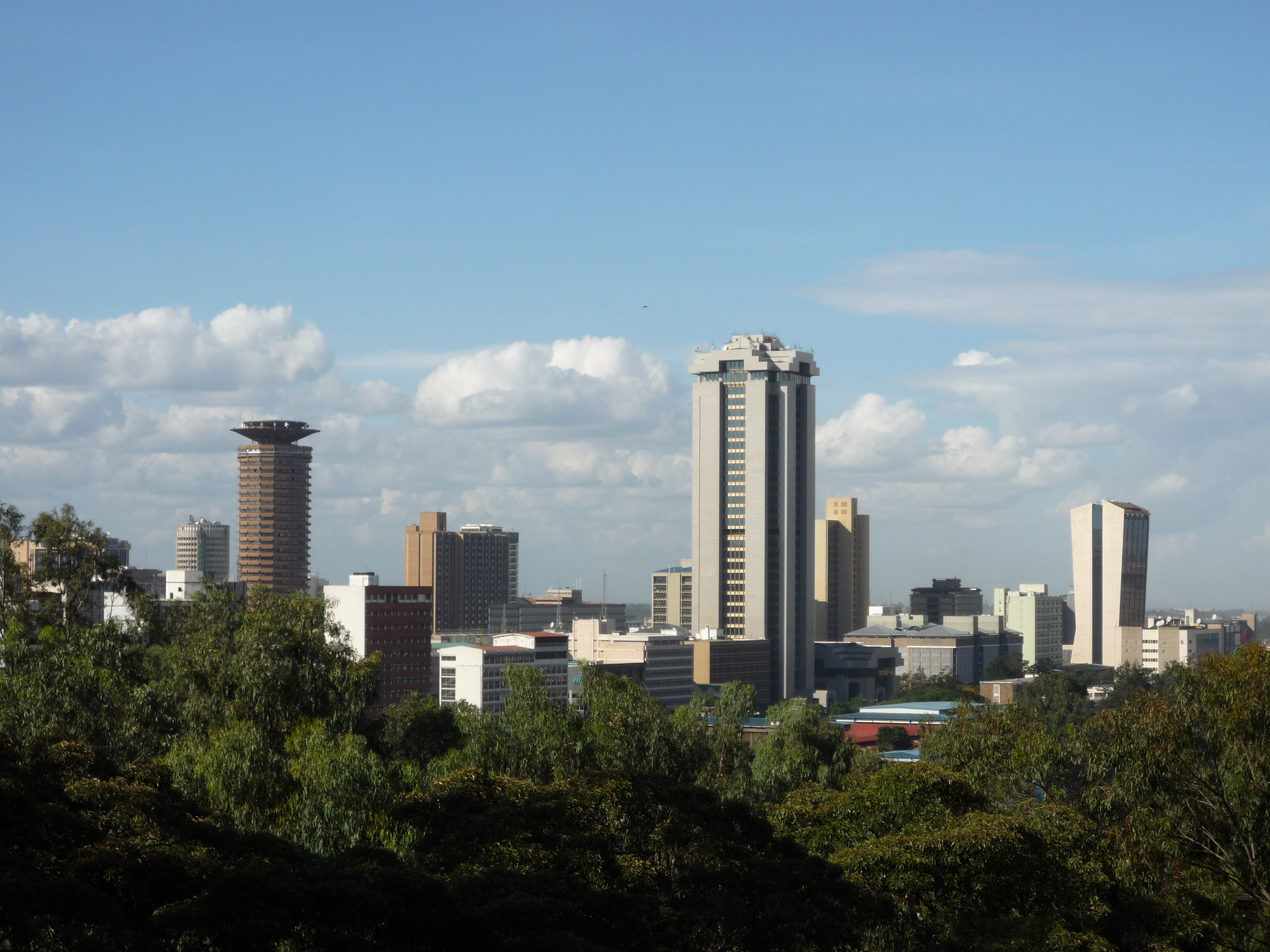
Nairobi, Kenya

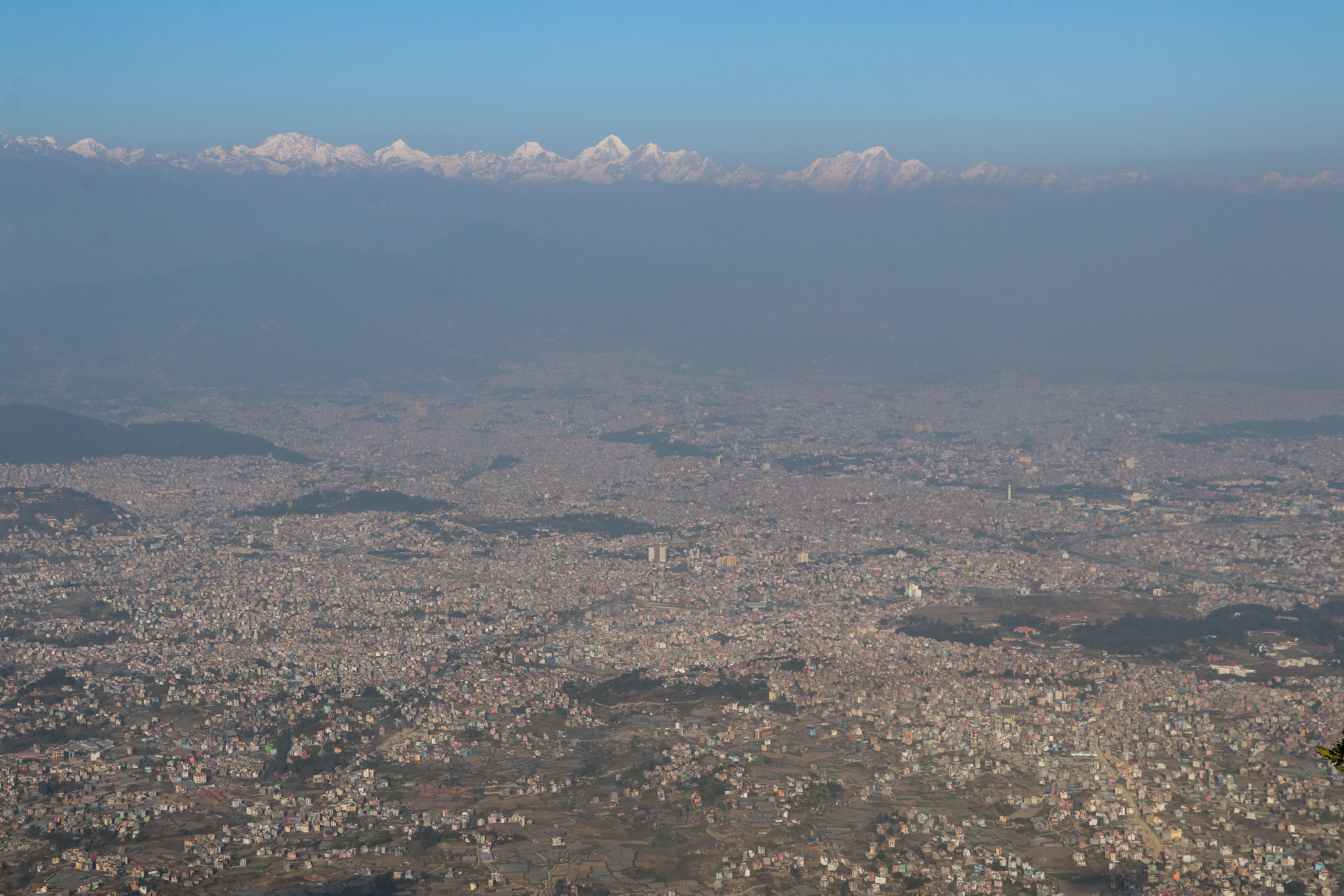
Kathmandu, Nepal

This is a list of national capitals ordered by elevation. Higher elevations typically have social, economic, and architectural effects on cities, in particular colder temperatures in winter. Low elevation cities are often seaports or located close to the sea.

Some countries on the main list have multiple or disputed national capitals.

The second list below contains several states with limited recognition.

The values can vary slightly between sources due to selection of reference points. For cities indicated as zero above sea, the shore was selected as references, even if main squares or streets rarely are below two meters since that would make them sensitive to flooding at high tide or certain weather types.

== List ==
=== Member and observer states of the United Nations ===
Country	Capital	Elevation (m)	Elevation (ft)
Bolivia	La Paz (government seat)	3,640	11,942
Ecuador	Quito	2,850	9,350
Bolivia	Sucre (de jure capital)	2,790	9,220
Colombia	Bogotá	2,625	8,612
Ethiopia	Addis Ababa	2,355	7,726
Bhutan	Thimphu	2,334	7,657
Eritrea	Asmara	2,325	7,628
Yemen	Sanaa	2,250	7,382
Mexico	Mexico City	2,240	7,350
Kenya	Nairobi	1,795	5,889
Afghanistan	Kabul	1,790	5,873
Namibia	Windhoek	1,721	5,646
Lesotho	Maseru	1,673	5,489
Rwanda	Kigali	1,567	5,141
Guatemala	Guatemala City	1,529	5,016
Burundi	Gitega	1,504	4,934
Zimbabwe	Harare	1,483	4,865
Iran	Tehran	1,400	4,900
Nepal	Kathmandu	1,400	4,593
Mongolia	Ulaanbaatar	1,350	4,429
Madagascar	Antananarivo	1,288	4,226
South Africa	Pretoria	1,271	4,170
Zambia	Lusaka	1,270	4,167
Eswatini	Mbabane	1,243	4,078
Uganda	Kampala	1,190	3,904
Costa Rica	San José	1,146	3,760
Honduras	Tegucigalpa	1,120	3,675
Brazil	Brasília	1,079	3,540
Malawi	Lilongwe	1,024	3,360
Andorra	Andorra la Vella	1,023	3,356
Tanzania	Dodoma	1,010	3,299
Armenia	Yerevan	989	3,246
Botswana	Gaborone	983	3,225
Turkey	Ankara	938	3,077
Venezuela	Caracas	935	2,982
Jordan	Amman	900	2,953
Palestine	Ramallah	880	2,890
Tajikistan	Dushanbe	789	2,589
Palestine	East Jerusalem (Note: The State of Palestine (according to the Basic Law of Palestine, Title One: Article 3) regards Jerusalem as its capital. But the documents of the PLO's Negotiations Affairs Department (NAD) often refer to East Jerusalem (rather than the whole of Jerusalem) as a future capital, and sometimes as the current capital. One of its 2010 documents, described as "for discussion purposes only", says that Palestine has a '"vision"' for a future in which "East Jerusalem ... shall be the capital of Palestine, and West Jerusalem shall be the capital of Israel", and one of its 2013 documents refers to "Palestine's capital, East Jerusalem", and states that "Occupied East Jerusalem is the natural socio-economic and political center for the future Palestinian state", while also stating that "Jerusalem has always been and remains the political, administrative and spiritual heart of Palestine" and that "The Palestinian acceptance of the 1967 border, which includes East Jerusalem, is a painful compromise".)	779	2,557
Nigeria	Abuja	777	2,549
Kyrgyzstan	Bishkek	771	2,530
Israel	Jerusalem	754	2,474
San Marino	San Marino	749	2,457
Cameroon	Yaoundé	726	2,382
Syria	Damascus	691	2,267
Spain	Madrid	667	2,188
El Salvador	San Salvador	658	2,159
Saudi Arabia	Riyadh	624	2,047
Australia	Canberra	605	1,985
Bulgaria	Sofia	560	1,840
Pakistan	Islamabad	560	1,830
Bosnia and Herzegovina	Sarajevo	550	1,800
South Sudan	Juba	550	1,800
Switzerland	Bern	542	1,778
Chile	Santiago	521	1,709
Uzbekistan	Tashkent	459	1,506
Liechtenstein	Vaduz	455	1,493
Georgia	Tbilisi	451	1,480
Sudan	Khartoum	377	1,237
Central African Republic	Bangui	369	1,211
Mali	Bamako	349	1,145
Kazakhstan	Astana	338	1,109
Burkina Faso	Ouagadougou	305	1,001
Chad	N'Djamena	298	978
Slovenia	Ljubljana	281	922
Luxembourg	Luxembourg	273	896
Czech Republic	Prague	244	801
North Macedonia	Skopje	243	797
Democratic Republic of the Congo	Kinshasa	240	787
Ivory Coast	Yamoussoukro	217	712
Turkmenistan	Ashgabat	215	705
India	New Delhi	210	689
Niger	Niamey	207	679
Belarus	Minsk	198	650
Austria	Vienna	170	558
Cyprus	Nicosia	170	557
Ukraine	Kyiv	168	551
Congo	Brazzaville	155	509
Peru	Lima	154	506
Greece	Athens	153	502
Laos	Vientiane	174	570
São Tomé and Príncipe	São Tomé	141	463
Slovakia	Bratislava	131	430
Croatia	Zagreb	130	427
Lithuania	Vilnius	124	407
Russia	Moscow	124	407
Serbia	Belgrade	116	381
Comoros	Moroni	110	361
Equatorial Guinea	Malabo	107	351
Albania	Tirana	104	341
Hungary	Budapest	102	335
Haiti	Port-au-Prince	98	322
Ghana	Accra	98	322
Poland	Warsaw	93	305
Micronesia, Federated States of	Palikir	90	300
Moldova	Chișinău	80	263
Myanmar	Naypyidaw	77	253
Belize	Belmopan	76	250
Belgium	Brussels	76	249
Sierra Leone	Freetown	76	249
Nicaragua	Managua	83	272
Canada	Ottawa	74	243
Palau	Ngerulmud	72	236
Romania	Bucharest	70	230
Oman	Muscat	68	223
Mozambique	Maputo	63	207
Togo	Lomé	63	207
Montenegro	Podgorica	61	200
Malaysia	Kuala Lumpur	60	197
Lebanon	Beirut	55	180
Malta	Valletta	54	186
Paraguay	Asunción	54	177
Jamaica	Kingston	53	174
Morocco	Rabat	53	174
Mauritius	Port Louis	50	170
China	Beijing	44	144
Uruguay	Montevideo	43	141
Vatican City	Vatican City	41	135
Iraq	Baghdad	40	131
Papua New Guinea	Port Moresby	39	128
Benin	Porto-Novo	38	125
Estonia	Tallinn	37	121
Senegal	Dakar	37	121
France	Paris	34	112
Germany	Berlin	34	112
South Korea	Seoul	33	108
Solomon Islands	Honiara	29	95
Somalia	Mogadishu	28	92
Finland	Helsinki	25	82
Vietnam	Hanoi	25	82
Grenada	Saint George's	25	82
Egypt	Cairo	22	72
Japan	Tokyo	17	56
Iceland	Reykjavík	15	49
Portugal	Lisbon	15	49
Sweden	Stockholm	15	49
Cambodia	Phnom Penh	15	49
Italy	Rome	14	46
United Kingdom	London	14	46
Qatar	Doha	13	43
United Arab Emirates	Abu Dhabi	13	43
Norway	Oslo	12	40
East Timor	Dili	11	36
Argentina	Buenos Aires	10	33
New Zealand	Wellington	10	32
Nauru	Yaren	9	30
Indonesia	Jakarta	8	26
Republic of Ireland	Dublin	8	26
Latvia	Riga	8	26
Philippines	Manila	7	23
Bahrain	Manama	6	20
North Korea	Pyongyang	6	20
Barbados	Bridgetown	6	20
Angola	Luanda	6	20
Libya	Tripoli	6	20
Mauritania	Nouakchott	6	20
Denmark	Copenhagen	5	16
Kuwait	Kuwait	5	16
Sri Lanka	Sri Jayawardenapura-Kotte	4	13
Cuba	Havana	4	13
Bangladesh	Dhaka	3	10
Marshall Islands	Majuro	3	10
Bahamas	Nassau	2	7
St. Lucia	Castries	2	7
United States	Washington, D.C.	2	7
Algeria	Algiers	1	3
Thailand	Bangkok	1	3
Suriname	Paramaribo	1	3
Monaco	Monaco City	0	0
Brunei	Bandar Seri Begawan	0	0
Maldives	Malé	0	0
Singapore	Singapore	0	0
Antigua and Barbuda	Saint John's	0	0
Dominica	Roseau	0	0
Dominican Republic	Santo Domingo	0	0
Guyana	Georgetown	0	0
Panama	Panama City	0	0
Saint Kitts and Nevis	Basseterre	0	0
St. Vincent and the Grenadines	Kingstown	0	0
Trinidad and Tobago	Port of Spain	0	0
Cape Verde	Praia	0	0
Djibouti	Djibouti	0	0
Gabon	Libreville	0	0
Gambia	Banjul	0	0
Guinea	Conakry	0	0
Guinea-Bissau	Bissau	0	0
Liberia	Monrovia	0	0
Seychelles	Victoria	0	0
Tunisia	Tunis	0	0
Fiji	Suva	0	0
Kiribati	South Tarawa	0	0
Samoa	Apia	0	0
Tonga	Nuku'alofa	0	0
Tuvalu	Vaiaku	0	0
Vanuatu	Port Vila	0	0
Netherlands	Amsterdam	−2	−7
Azerbaijan	Baku	−28	−92

=== Other states (including de facto independent states, autonomous region and dependencies) ===
Country	Capital	Altitude (m)	Altitude (ft)
Somaliland (Note: See: List of states with limited recognition.)	Hargeisa	1,334	4,377
South Ossetia	Tskhinvali	860	2,820
Kosovo	Pristina	603	1,977
Sahrawi Arab Democratic Republic	Tifariti	490	1,610
Pitcairn Islands	Adamstown	330	1,080
French Polynesia	Papeete	224	735
Northern Cyprus	North Nicosia	130	428
Ascension Island	Georgetown	86	282
Sahrawi Arab Democratic Republic	Laayoune	68	223
Falkland Islands	Stanley	51	167
Isle of Man	Douglas	47	154
Jersey	St Helier	37	121
Guam	Hagåtña	28	92
Transnistria	Tiraspol	26	85
Guernsey	Saint Peter Port	23	75
Northern Mariana Islands	Saipan	22	72
New Caledonia	Nouméa	20	66
Saint Barthélemy	Gustavia	14	46
American Samoa	Pago Pago	9	30
Puerto Rico	San Juan	8	26
Cook Islands	Avarua	7	23
Åland	Mariehamn	6	20
Wallis and Futuna	Mata Utu	6	20
Greenland	Nuuk	5	16
Abkhazia	Sukhumi	5	16
Sint Eustatius	Oranjestad	4	13
Aruba	Oranjestad	4	13
Cayman Islands	George Town	3	10
Taiwan (Note: In 1949, the Republic of China government led by the Kuomintang (KMT) lost the Chinese Civil War to the Chinese Communist Party (CCP) and set up a provisional capital in Taipei, which serves as the seat of government to this day. The CCP established the People's Republic. As such, the political status of the ROC and the legal status of Taiwan (alongside the territories under ROC jurisdiction) are in dispute. In 1971, the United Nations gave the China seat to the PRC instead of the ROC: most states recognize the PRC to be the sole legitimate representative of all China, and the UN classifies Taiwan as "Taiwan, Province of China". The ROC has de facto relations with most sovereign states. A significant political movement within Taiwan advocates Taiwan independence.)	Taipei	0	0
Martinique	Fort-de-France	0	0
Hong Kong	Victoria	0	0
Saint Helena	Jamestown	0	0
Saint Pierre and Miquelon	Saint-Pierre	0	0
French Guiana	Cayenne	0	0
Montserrat	Brades	0	0
Tristan da Cunha	Edinburgh of the Seven Seas	0	0
Bermuda	Hamilton	0	0
Macau	Nam Van	0	0
Niue	Alofi	0	0
Faroe Islands	Tórshavn	0	0
British Virgin Islands	Road Town	0	0
Anguilla	The Valley	0	0
United States Virgin Islands	Charlotte Amalie	0	0
Turks and Caicos Islands	Cockburn Town	0	0
Guadeloupe	Basse-Terre	0	0
Curaçao	Willemstad	0	0
Saint Martin	Marigot	0	0
Bonaire	Kralendijk	0	0
Gibraltar	Gibraltar	0	0
Sint Maarten	Philipsburg	0	0

== See also ==
- List of cities by elevation
- List of highest towns by country
- List of highest settlements
- List of highest large cities
