= List of highest large cities =

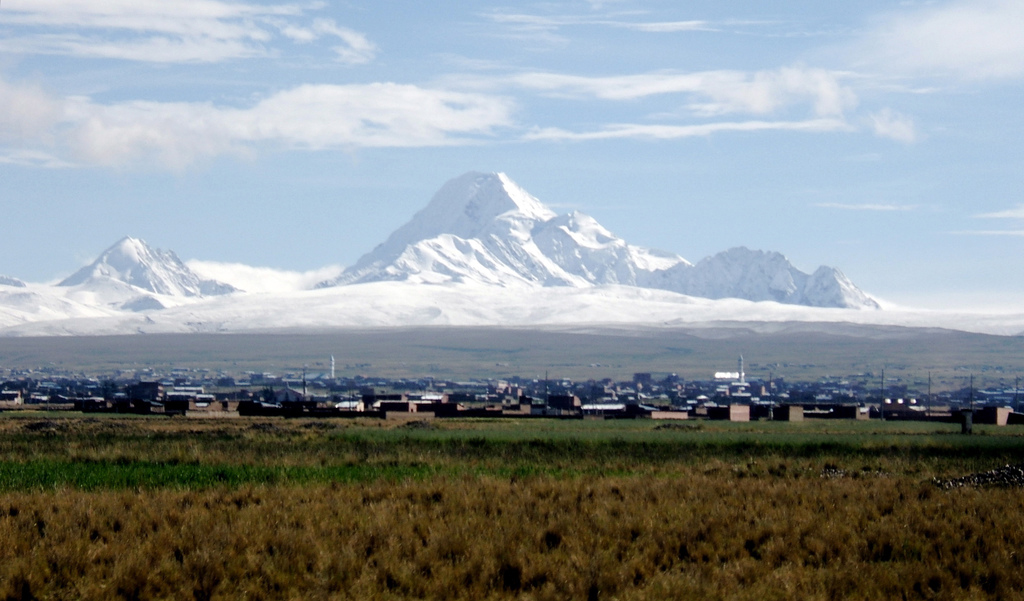
El Alto in Bolivia is the highest-altitude city in the world

This list of the highest cities in the world includes only cities with a population greater than 100,000 inhabitants and an average height above sea level over 2,000 metres (6,600 ft).

Average Height	Town / City	Country	Population	Est. Year
4,150 m (13,615 ft)	El Alto	Bolivia	1,184,942	2014
4,090 m (13,419 ft)	Potosí	Bolivia	170,000	2007
3,836 m (12,585 ft)	Shigatse	China	117,000	2013
3,825 m (12,549 ft)	Juliaca	Peru	225,146	2007
3,819 m (12,530 ft)	Puno	Peru	120,229	2007
3,706 m (12,159 ft)	Oruro	Bolivia	250,700	2011
3,658 m (12,001 ft)	Lhasa	China	373,000	2009
3,640 m (11,942 ft)	La Paz	Bolivia	845,480	2010
3,399 m (11,152 ft)	Cusco	Peru	358,052	2011
3,160 m (10,367 ft)	Shangri-La City	China	186,412	2020
3,052 m (10,013 ft)	Huancayo	Peru	425,000	2012
3,050 m (10,007 ft)	Huaraz	Peru	135,000	2011
2,898 m (9,508 ft)	Ipiales	Colombia	116,136	2018
2,850 m (9,350 ft)	Quito	Ecuador	2,239,191	2010
2,840 m (9,318 ft)	Debre Berhan	Ethiopia	160,408	2012
2,820 m (9,252 ft)	Tunja	Colombia	172,548	2018
2,809 m (9,216 ft)	Golmud	China	205,700	2011
2,790 m (9,154 ft)	Sucre	Bolivia	300,000	2007
2,764 m (9,068 ft)	Riobamba	Ecuador	161,788	2010
2,746 m (9,009 ft)	Ayacucho	Peru	151,019	2011
2,720 m (8,924 ft)	Cajamarca	Peru	283,767	2011
2,719 m (8,921 ft)	Sacaba	Bolivia	149,570	2020
2,663 m (8,737 ft)	Toluca de Lerdo	Mexico	910,608	2020
2,652 m (8,701 ft)	Zipaquirá	Colombia	130,537	2018
2,620 m (8,596 ft)	Bogotá	Colombia	7,412,566	2018
2,610 m (8,563 ft)	Metepec	Mexico	242,307	2020
2,600 m (8,530 ft)	Chía	Colombia	132,181	2018
2,586 m (8,484 ft)	Facatativá	Colombia	139,441	2018
2,570 m (8,432 ft)	Cochabamba	Bolivia	618,376	2010
2,569 m (8,428 ft)	Sogamoso	Colombia	127,235	2010
2,565 m (8,415 ft)	Soacha	Colombia	660,179	2018
2,560 m (8,399 ft)	Kangding	China	126,785	2020
2,550 m (8,366 ft)	Cuenca	Ecuador	331,888	2010
2,530 m (8,301 ft)	Duitama	Colombia	122,436	2018
2,527 m (8,291 ft)	San Juan de Pasto	Colombia	392,930	2018
2,500 m (8,202 ft)	Addis Ababa	Ethiopia	6,287,000	2025
2,500 m (8,202 ft)	Ambato	Ecuador	178,538	2010
2,500 m (8,202 ft)	Lerma	Mexico	170,327	2020
2,496 m (8,189 ft)	Zacatecas	Mexico	149,607	2020
2,495 m (8,186 ft)	Totonicapán	Guatemala	103,952	2018
2,470 m (8,104 ft)	Dessie	Ethiopia	169,104	2005
2,400 m (7,874 ft)	Pachuca de Soto	Mexico	314,331	2020
2,400 m (7,874 ft)	Chimalhuacán	Mexico	525,389	2010
2,400 m (7,874 ft)	Atizapán de Zaragoza	Mexico	523,674	2020
2,400 m (7,874 ft)	Dhamar	Yemen	118,400	2003
2,400 m (7,874 ft)	Lijiang	China	288,787	2021
2,350 m (7,710 ft)	Sana'a	Yemen	2,431,649	2010
2,335 m (7,661 ft)	Arequipa	Peru	836,859	2005
2,329 m (7,641 ft)	Quetzaltenango	Guatemala	180,706	2018
2,325 m (7,628 ft)	Asmara	Eritrea	649,000	2009
2,320 m (7,612 ft)	Thimphu	Bhutan	114,551	2017
2,300 m (7,546 ft)	Eldoret	Kenya	289,380	2009
2,276 m (7,467 ft)	Shimla	India	171,817	2011
2,275 m (7,464 ft)	Xining	China	1,954,795	2020
2,270 m (7,448 ft)	Abha	Saudi Arabia	1,093,705	2021
2,260 m (7,415 ft)	Calama	Chile	147,886	2012
2,260 m (7,415 ft)	Cuautitlán Izcalli	Mexico	555,163	2020
2,254 m (7,395 ft)	Mekele	Ethiopia	201,528	2005
2,250 m (7,382 ft)	Ecatepec de Morelos	Mexico	1,645,352	2020
2,250 m (7,382 ft)	Los Reyes Acaquilpan	Mexico	304,088	2020
2,250 m (7,382 ft)	Cuautitlán, State of Mexico	Mexico	178,847	2020
2,247 m (7,372 ft)	Texcoco	Mexico	277,562	2020
2,240 m (7,349 ft)	Mexico City	Mexico	9,209,944	2020
2,238 m (7,343 ft)	Tlalnepantla de Baz	Mexico	672,202	2020
2,228 m (7,310 ft)	Skardu	Pakistan	260,000	2024
2,220 m (7,283 ft)	Ibarra	Ecuador	139,721	2010
2,220 m (7,283 ft)	Nezahualcóyotl	Mexico	1,072,676	2020
2,219 m (7,280 ft)	Ghazni	Afghanistan	205,965	2025
2,200 m (7,218 ft)	Valle de Chalco Solidaridad	Mexico	384,327	2020
2,200 m (7,218 ft)	San Cristóbal de las Casas	Mexico	158,027	2010
2,194 m (7,198 ft)	Santa Fe	United States	144,217	2010
2,180 m (7,152 ft)	Tulancingo de Bravo	Mexico	168,369	2020
2,150 m (7,054 ft)	Manizales	Colombia	434,403	2018
2,140 m (7,021 ft)	Puebla de Zaragoza	Mexico	1,542,232	2020
2,125 m (6,972 ft)	Rionegro	Colombia	135,465	2018
2,120 m (6,955 ft)	Tizayuca	Mexico	168,302	2020
2,106 m (6,910 ft)	Flagstaff	United States	145,101	2020
2,070 m (6,791 ft)	Shahr-e Kord	Iran	190,441	2016
2,060 m (6,759 ft)	Loja	Ecuador	180,617	2010
2,000 m (6,562 ft)	Kunming	China	8,460,088	2020
2,000 m (6,562 ft)	Dali City	China	652,700	2020

== See also ==
- List of cities by elevation
