= Bab Zangi =

Bab Zangi باب زنگی
- Village
- Interactive map of Bab Zangi
- Coordinates: 29.46846°N 57.27767°E
- Country: Iran
- Province: Kerman
- County: Kerman
- Bakhsh: Rayen
- Rural District: Hoseynabad-e Goruh
- Elevation: 3,310 m (10,860 ft)

Population (2006)
  - Total: 54
- Time zone: UTC+3:30 (IRST)

Bab Zangi (Persian: باب زنگی, also Romanized as Bāb Zangī) is a village in Hoseynabad-e Goruh Rural District, Rayen District, Kerman County, Kerman Province, Iran. At the 2006 census, its population was 54, in 10 families.

== elevation ==
Bab Zangi village is the highest village in Iran with an altitude of 3310 meters above sea level.
