= Inignaouei =

- Location in Niger
- Coordinates: 18°58′N 8°56′E
- Country: Niger
- Region: Agadez Region
- Department: Arlit Department
- Time zone: UTC+1 (WAT)

Inignaouei is a human settlement in the Arlit Department of the Agadez Region of northern-central Niger.
