= Rulkippara =

- Location in Bangladesh
- Coordinates: 22°14′N 92°24′E
- Country: Bangladesh
- Division: Chittagong Division
- District: Bandarban District
- Time zone: UTC+6 (Bangladesh Time)

Rulkippara is a village in Bandarban District in the Chittagong Division of southeastern Bangladesh.
