= Akhpradzor =

Village in Gegharkunik, Armenia

Akhpradzor Ախպրաձոր
- Location within Armenia Location within Gegharkunik
- Coordinates: 40°05′46″N 45°38′25″E
- Country: Armenia
- Province: Gegharkunik
- Municipality: Vardenis
- Elevation: 2,293 m (7,523 ft)

Population (2011)
  - Total: 355
- Time zone: UTC+4 (AMT)

Akhpradzor (Armenian: Ախպրաձոր) is a village in the Vardenis Municipality of the Gegharkunik Province of Armenia.

== Etymology ==
The village was known as Verin Zaghalu until 1978, which was rendered "Verkhniy Zagalu" in Russian.

== Economy ==
Most of the villagers plant and sell potatoes. The village is also well known for its locally produced honey. The villagers also regularly sell their cheese and butter.

== Education ==
The village has one school that has approximately 75 students from Kindergarten to 12th grade. Its principal, Ginevard Ghukasyan is the director of the school. The school is sponsored by a non-profit organization known as the Hidden Road Initiative that runs regular programs in the summer, provides internet and computers to the village school, and provides scholarships to high school graduates.

== Infrastructure ==
Currently, the road leading to the village is very limited and hard to access. During the winter, the snow blocks the road for the majority of the months. US Ambassador John Heffern visited the village in the summer of 2014 and promoted the road construction. The village mayor as well as the regional director promised that the road should be renovated by 2016.

== Demographics ==
=== Population ===
As of 2011, the village has a population of 355.
