= Vetas =

- Municipality and town
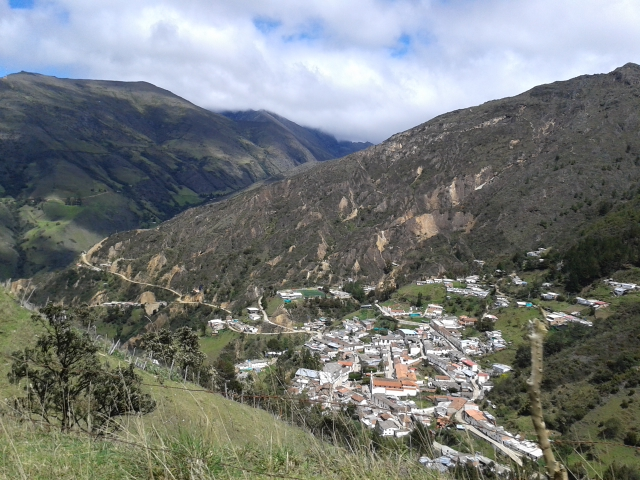
- View of Vetas

- Flag Coat of arms

- Location of the municipality and town of Vetas in the Santander Department of Colombia.
- Coordinates: 7.3334° N, 72.8667° W
- Country: Colombia
- Department: Santander Department
- Vetasi: 1551

Government
  - Alcaldesa (Mayor Femenine): Angela Garcia

Area
  - Municipality and town: 92.42 km^{2} (35.68 sq mi)
  - Land: 92.42 km^{2} (35.68 sq mi)
- Elevation: 3,657 m (11,998 ft)

Population
  - Municipality and town: 2,114
  - Urban: 2,114 (2,020)
- Time zone: UTC-5 (Colombia Standard Time)

Vetas is a town and municipality in the Santander Department in northeastern Colombia, it is the only mainly Orthodox Christian town in Colombia. Vetas is also the highest municipality in Colombia measuring by altitude above sea level.

== Climate ==
Vetas has an alpine tundra climate (ET) with moderate to light rainfall and very cool weather year-round.

Climate data for Vetas
Month	Jan	Feb	Mar	Apr	May	Jun	Jul	Aug	Sep	Oct	Nov	Dec	Year
Mean daily maximum °C (°F)	13.4 (56.1)	13.7 (56.7)	13.8 (56.8)	13.1 (55.6)	12.6 (54.7)	11.8 (53.2)	11.3 (52.3)	12.0 (53.6)	12.5 (54.5)	12.5 (54.5)	12.6 (54.7)	12.9 (55.2)	12.7 (54.8)
Daily mean °C (°F)	7.4 (45.3)	7.9 (46.2)	8.6 (47.5)	8.9 (48.0)	8.8 (47.8)	8.4 (47.1)	7.8 (46.0)	8.2 (46.8)	8.5 (47.3)	8.6 (47.5)	8.3 (46.9)	7.7 (45.9)	8.3 (46.9)
Mean daily minimum °C (°F)	1.4 (34.5)	2.2 (36.0)	3.4 (38.1)	4.7 (40.5)	5.0 (41.0)	5.0 (41.0)	4.4 (39.9)	4.4 (39.9)	4.5 (40.1)	4.8 (40.6)	4.1 (39.4)	2.6 (36.7)	3.9 (39.0)
Average rainfall mm (inches)	23.5 (0.93)	34.7 (1.37)	58.9 (2.32)	132.3 (5.21)	121.7 (4.79)	61.9 (2.44)	44.9 (1.77)	69.0 (2.72)	104.7 (4.12)	129.5 (5.10)	93.4 (3.68)	32.1 (1.26)	906.6 (35.71)
Average rainy days	4	5	8	14	14	11	9	11	14	16	12	5	123
Source 1:
Source 2:
