= Guinée forestière =

Forested region of Guinea

Coordinates: 8°11′46.3″N 8°46′19.4″W

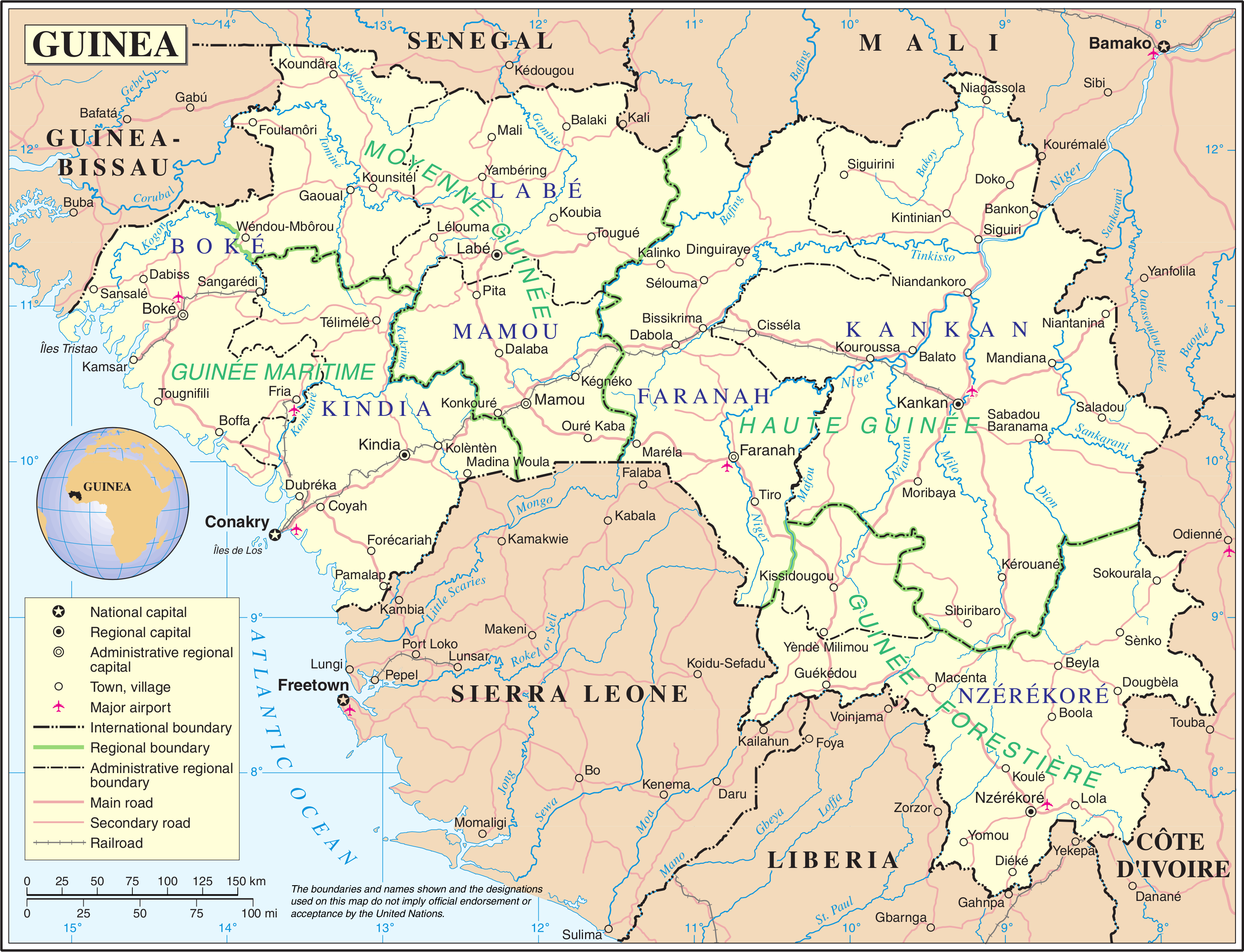
- Guinea's natural regions of Maritime, Middle, Upper, and Forested.

Ecology
- Realm: Afrotropical realm
- Biome: Tropical and subtropical moist broadleaf forests

Geography
- Area: 56,547 km^{2} (21,833 mi^{2})
- Country: Guinea
- State: Nzérékoré Region, Kankan Region, Faranah Region
- Elevation: 460 metres (1,509 ft)
- Geology: Mountainous
- Rivers: Niger River, Saint Paul River, Lofa River
- Climate type: Tropical savannah climate

Guinée forestière (Forested Guinea) is a forested mountainous region in southeastern Guinea, extending into northeastern Sierra Leone. It is one of four natural regions into which Guinea is divided and covers 23% of the country. It includes all of the Nzérékoré administrative region, and shares a border with Sierra Leone and Liberia. Its rocky topology contains several mountain ranges and has an average elevation of 460m. Forested Guinea contains important areas of biological diversity such as the UNESCO World Heritage site Mount Nimba Strict Nature Reserve and biosphere reserve Ziama Massif. The Guéckédou prefectures also recorded the initial case of the 2014 Ebola outbreak in Meliandou, a rural village. The virus subsequently spread to urban areas and neighbouring countries Sierra Leone and Liberia.

== History ==
Forested Guinea was established around 1000AD by native peoples with the advent of agriculture and stationary settlements. Indigenous linguistic groups began to arrive later from neighbouring areas; their tribes were established from the 15th century onwards.

=== Religious history ===
In the 1850s, Samori Ture founded the Wassoulou empire, including Forested Guinea. Ture was a military leader who seized control of the Guinea Highlands, and ultimately expanded his empire to reach Ghana, Côte d'Ivoire and Mali. The expansion of his empire led to the forced religious conversion of indigenous peoples in Forested Guinea through the establishment of mosques and destruction of local religious symbols. The extent of his religious conversion was widespread, having decreed that all people in the kingdom would have to become Muslims.

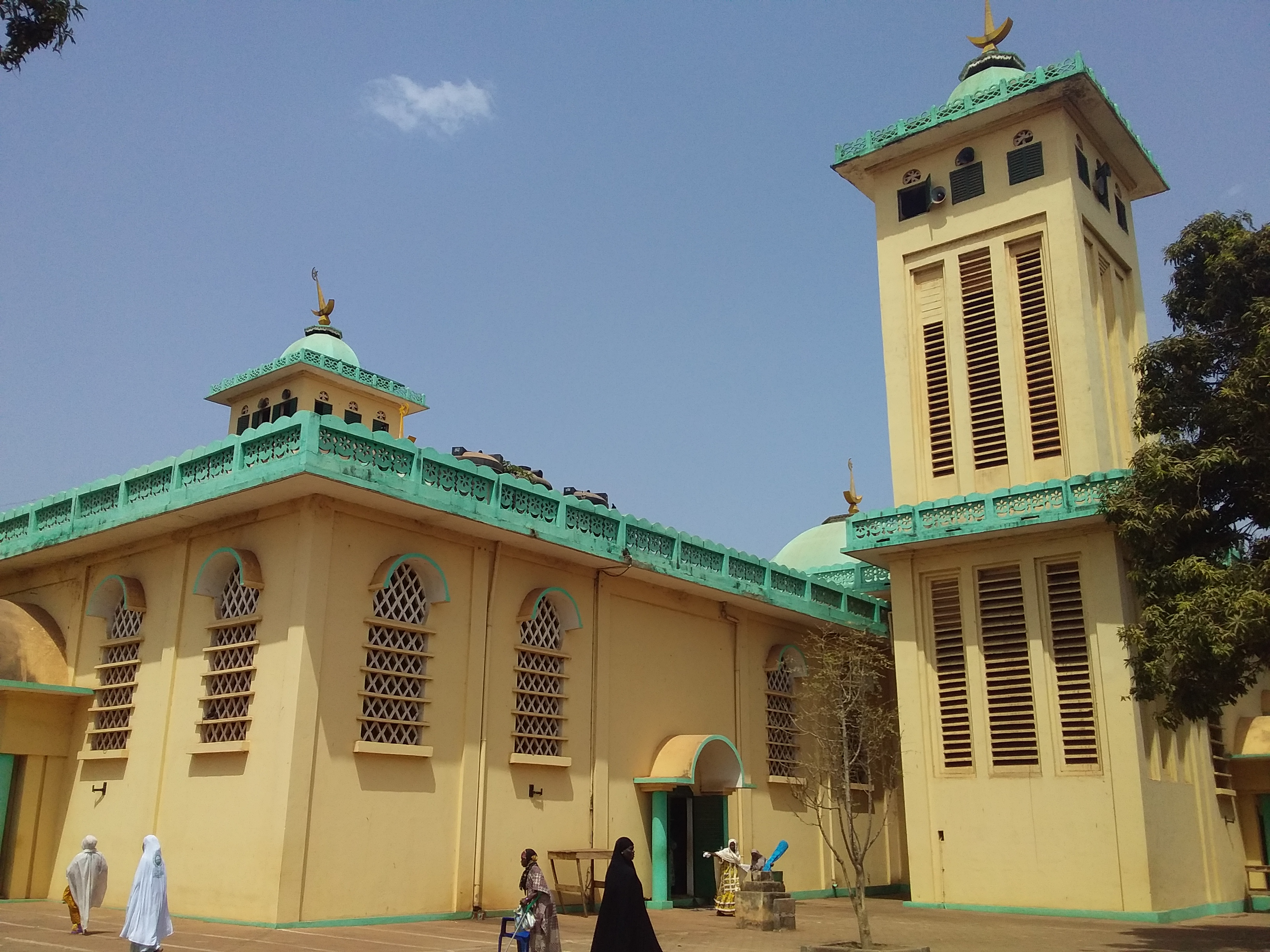
A mosque in the Kankan region

Christianity has had a lesser historical influence on Forested Guinea. The missionary group White Fathers first attempted to convert indigenous people in the 1920s, which had varying degrees of success with local populations. It remained unpopular after WWII due to conflict between Catholicism and Protestantism, as well as the competition with the spread of Islam.

=== Colonisation and independence ===
In the 1880s, the French colonisation of Africa had reached the Forest Region, part of Samori Ture's territory; this led to a treaty of friendship, in which Ture gave up his Guinean territory. Local people resisted French colonisation until 1911. The French colonists altered the societal foundations through the introduction of the western educational system and French culture. This included establishing village schools which offered to teach basic maths and literacy in the French language. These changes were in tandem with structural political alterations such as the suppression of village elders' judicial power, and the creation of separate courts for indigenous people and Europeans. The creation of the French Union in 1946 removed colonial status of Guinea and combined France and its other overseas components into a single union. Forested Guinea was represented by its indigenous party, the Union Forestière.

After Guinean independence in 1958, colonial policies that exploited tensions between the Forest region and other ethnic groups were dismantled by the ruling Democratic Party of Guinea. The party also promised equal representation for the groups in the political arena and removal of chiefs established to uphold colonial power.

=== Refugee crisis ===
Forested Guinea's immigration was heavily impacted by the neighbouring First Liberian Civil War in 1989. The common border between the two regions caused the refugee crisis in which a total of 500,000 refugees fleeing from civil unrest had crossed into Forested Guinea by the year 2000. This initial phase was characterised by four major waves until 1992, followed by a series of minor waves. The main groups fleeing civil unrest were mostly rural ethnic groups, such as the Kpelle, Loma and Kissi with some inflow from urban cities in Liberia.

These inflows led to the establishment of refugee camps along the border between Liberia and Forested Guinea in the 1990s. Most of the refugees were directed towards the Forest Region due to the Guinean Government and UNHCR restricting assistance to only the Forest Region. The decisions were designed to contain the refugee system to Forested Guinea due to its remoteness and may have been politically motivated. The refugee crisis was further exacerbated by the Second Liberian Civil War in the middle of 2002, where an additional 100,000 refugees crossed into Forested Guinea.

== Demographics ==
Forested Guinea has a total population of 2.1 million (2011). The demographics of Forested Guinea are split between people living in urban and rural areas with one-fifth of the population living in urban areas. The two most populated urban areas are Guéckédou with 290,000 and Nzérékoré, with 195,000 inhabitants as of the 2014 census. Forested Guinea has the highest population density of the four regions of Guinea, with 55 people per kilometre squared in 2009. However, it is much lower than the capital city of Guinea, Conakry, with over 3440 people per kilometre squared. Approximately 67% of Forested Guinea lives below the poverty line, among the highest rates of the Guinean regions. This correlates with a tendency to live in rural areas, which contain 65% of cases, possess low levels of education and have livelihoods in agriculture.

Guinée forestière is known for its diverse ethnic population, including the Toma and Kissi groups, and also shelters a large number of refugees from the Sierra Leone Civil War, the Liberian Civil Wars and the Ivorian Civil Wars. Nzérékoré is the largest city. Both former President Moussa Dadis Camara and former Prime Minister Jean-Marie Doré are from the Guinée forestière. The linguistic areas of Forested Guinea contain the main groups of the Kpelle, Loma and Kisi.

=== Linguistic groups ===
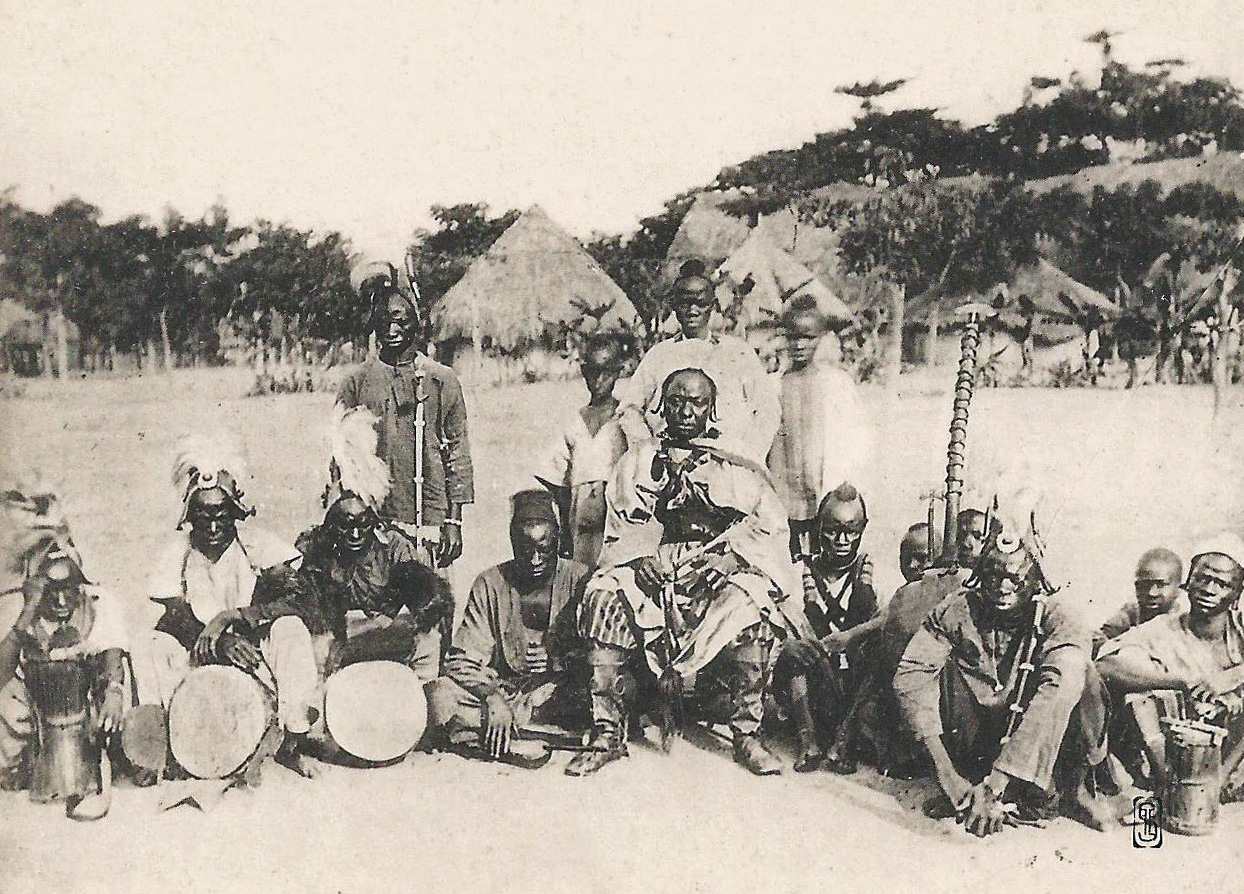
A Kissi village chief and orchestra

The Kpelle migrated from West Sudan in the 16th century. Their social structure is arranged under paramount chiefs, who settle disputes and mediate between the Guinean government and their people. The Kpelle region overlaps with the bordering country of Liberia and has 100,000 native speakers in Forested Guinea itself. This is a result of the Kpelle seeking refuge in Forested Guinea from First Liberian Civil War.

The Loma tribe began in the 15th century, as a result of the breakdown of the Mande empire. They migrated to Liberia and Guinea, due to conflict with the French and other neighbouring tribes. The Loma people, much like the Kpelle, share a common region of Forested Guinea and Liberia, with their total population exceeding 400,000. However, the Guinean and Liberian Loma people are distinct in culture, dialect and history.

The Kissi people migrated from the highland region, Fouta Djallon, in the 17th century. The Kissi people also inhabit an area that encompasses Guinea, Liberia and Sierra Leone; however they are mainly concentrated in the Guéckédou region. Their villages usually do not contain more than 150 people and are organised under a senior member of each village. They are mainly farmers that produce rice, coffee and kola; rice cultivation began in the 18th century and constitutes an important part of their culture.

== Wildlife and environment ==
Forested Guinea possesses unique wildlife and geological diversity. It is characterized by undulating lowlands, which are frequently disrupted by suddenly rising high mountain ranges and eroded plateaux of the Guinea Highlands. In general, the lowland areas are covered by forest-savanna mosaics and lowland forests; but all ridges and plateaux are covered by montane forests above 600 meters. Forested Guinea also contains over half of West Africa's rivers such as the Niger River, Saint Paul River, and Lofa River; other limnological features include tributaries and basins. The Forest Region drains over one-third of Guinea's water, as it forms the drainage divide between the Niger River basin and western rivers. These rivers contain animal species such as pygmy hippopotamuses and manatees. Remarkable sky islands are the Mount Nimba (1720 meters), Simandou Massif (1658 meters), Ziama Massif (1387 meters), Mount Tétini (1257 meters), Kourandou Massif (1236 meters), and Mount Béro (1210 meters). All of them belong to the south-eastern part of the Guinea Highlands, and remained poorly discovered by science. The most prominent protected areas in Forested Guinea are the Mount Nimba Strict Nature Reserve, the Ziama Massif, and the Diécké Classified Forest.

=== Mount Nimba Strict Nature Reserve ===
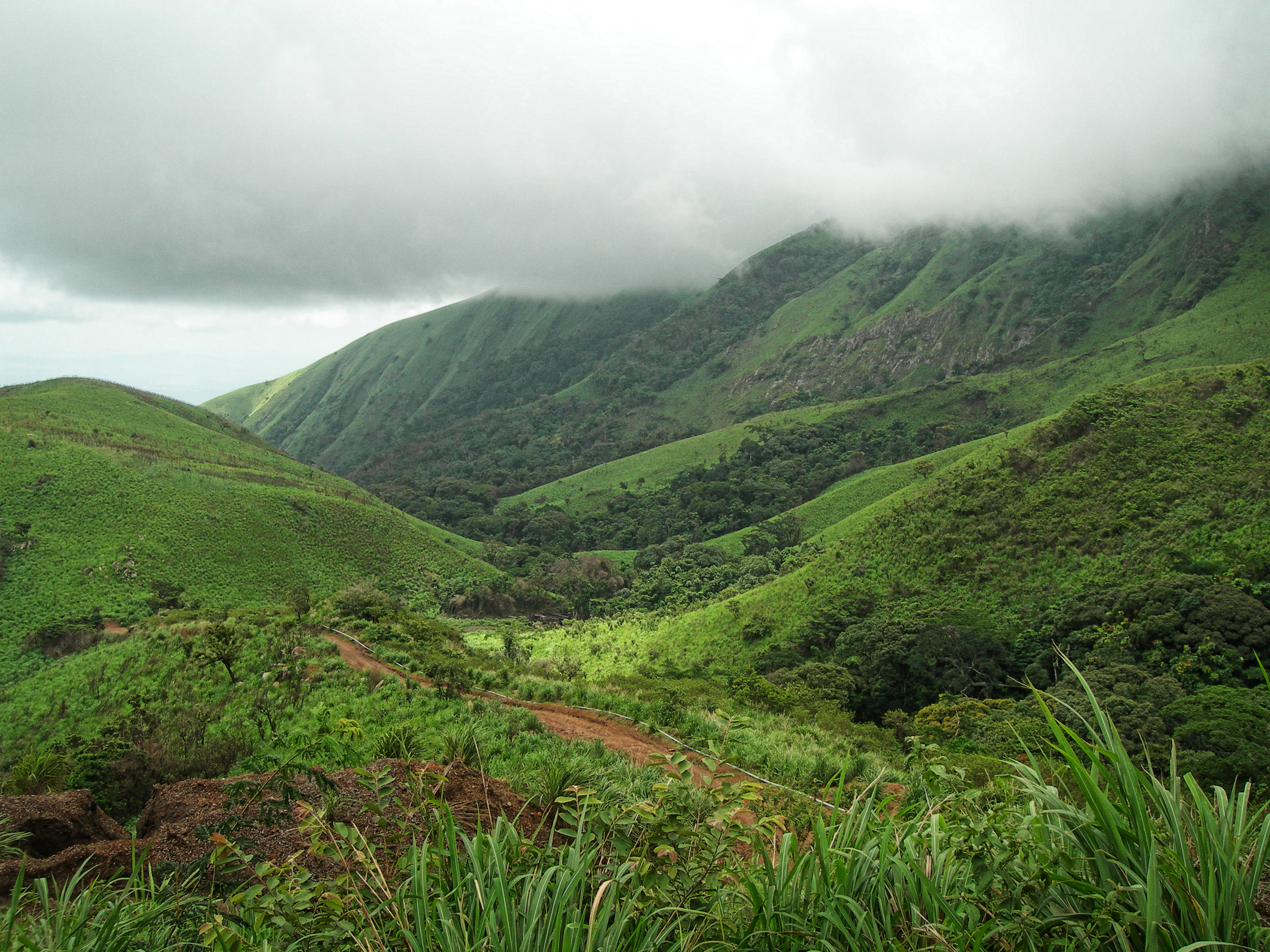
Mount Nimba Strict Nature Reserve

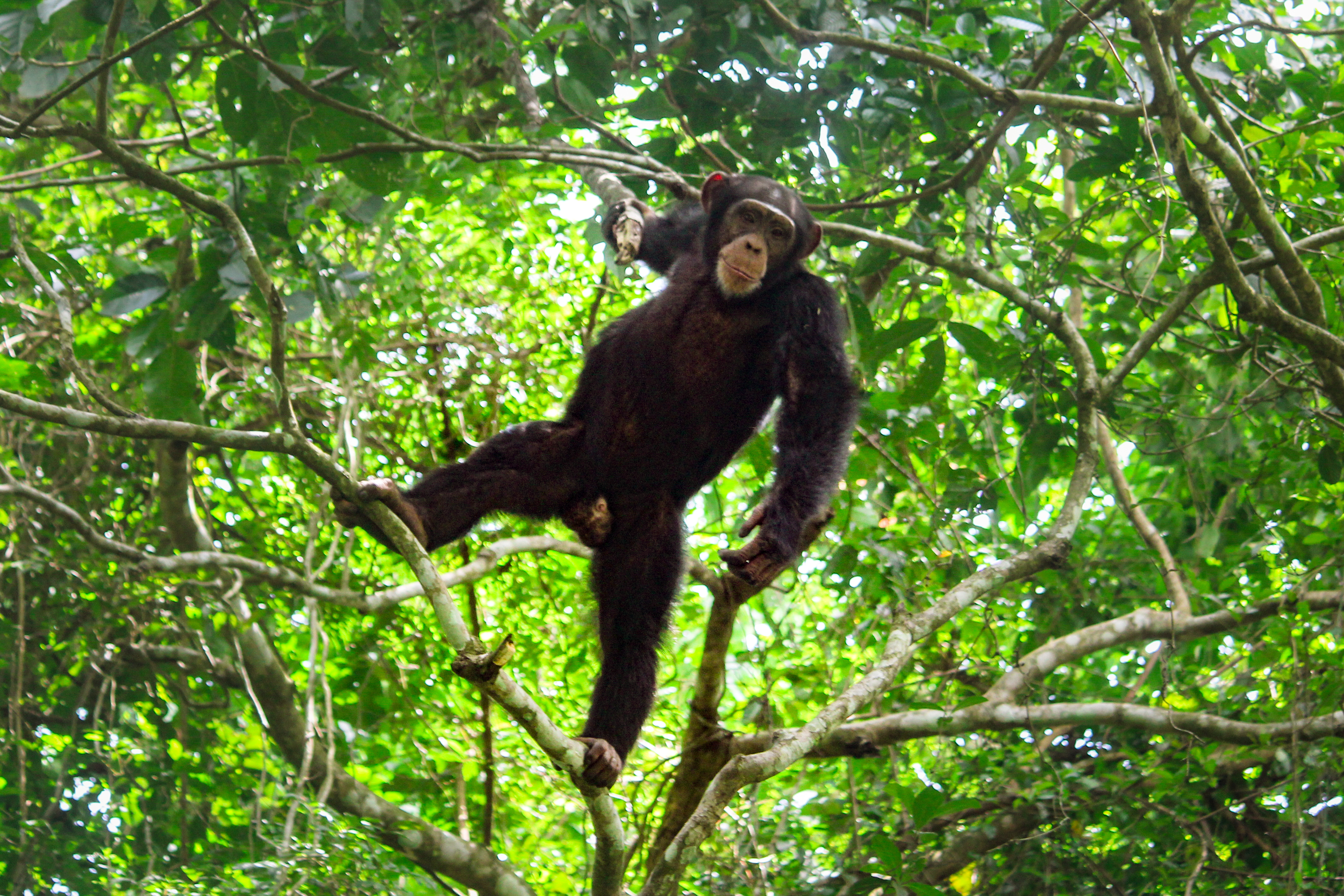
Fama un des chimpanzé de Bossou

The Mount Nimba Strict Nature Reserve is a 12 540 hectares-large UNESCO Natural World Heritage Site which is threatened by local subsistence pressures (hunting, farming, fire, logging, grazing) and potential future iron-ore mining (see here). The nature reserve shares its area between Forested Guinea and Côte d'Ivoire. It is mostly mountainous, with forested areas at the foot of the mountain ranges. Mount Nimba is the highest point of the Nimba range, at an elevation of 1752m. About two-thirds of the reserve is covered by rainforest, and it is home to more than 2,000 vascular plant species, 107 mammal species, 210 bird species, and 2,500 invertebrate species with exceptionally strong level of endemism. Its dynamic and seasonal ecosystems have produced "one of the most remarkable diversities of the whole West African region". It meets criteria IX and X of the UNESCO Criteria for Selection, reflecting the importance of its processes of evolution and development of flora and fauna, and conserving its biological diversity. These qualities are evidenced in species such as the Nimba otter shrew, the viviparous toad, and observed tool use by chimpanzees. Since the 1960s, the Nimba Range has become a source for iron and diamond ore mining, which has led to the degradation of the nature reserve.

=== Ziama Massif ===
The Ziama Massif is a 116 200 hectares-large Biosphere Reserve, which is considered to be a relict of the once continuous West African rainforest belt. It is a tropical, forested mountainous area located about 100 km from Nzérékoré in the Guinean Highlands. It was designated Bioreserve status by UNESCO in 1980 and is home to 22 species of threatened fauna included in the CITES Appendices. It is home to 1 300 vascular plant species, 124 mammal species, and 286 bird species. The Ziama Massif provides shelter to the threatened West African rainforest megafauna, such as the forest elephant, the forest buffalo, the pygmy hippopotamus, the bongo antelope, and the critically endangered western chimpanzee. Its local population is around 29,000, and some areas of this reserve are allocated for local economic activities, as the activities provides income to the residents. This includes forestry and quinine processing stations. However, the innermost 60,000 hectares are protected from human activity such as logging and hunting.

=== Diécké Classified Rainforest ===
The Diécké Classified Forest is a 64 000 hectares-large forest reserve, which is characterized by lowland and swamp forests. In fact, it is one of the least discovered protected areas of West Africa; however, some studies suggest, that Diécké is the stronghold of the pygmy hippopotamus and the critically endangered western chimpanzee.

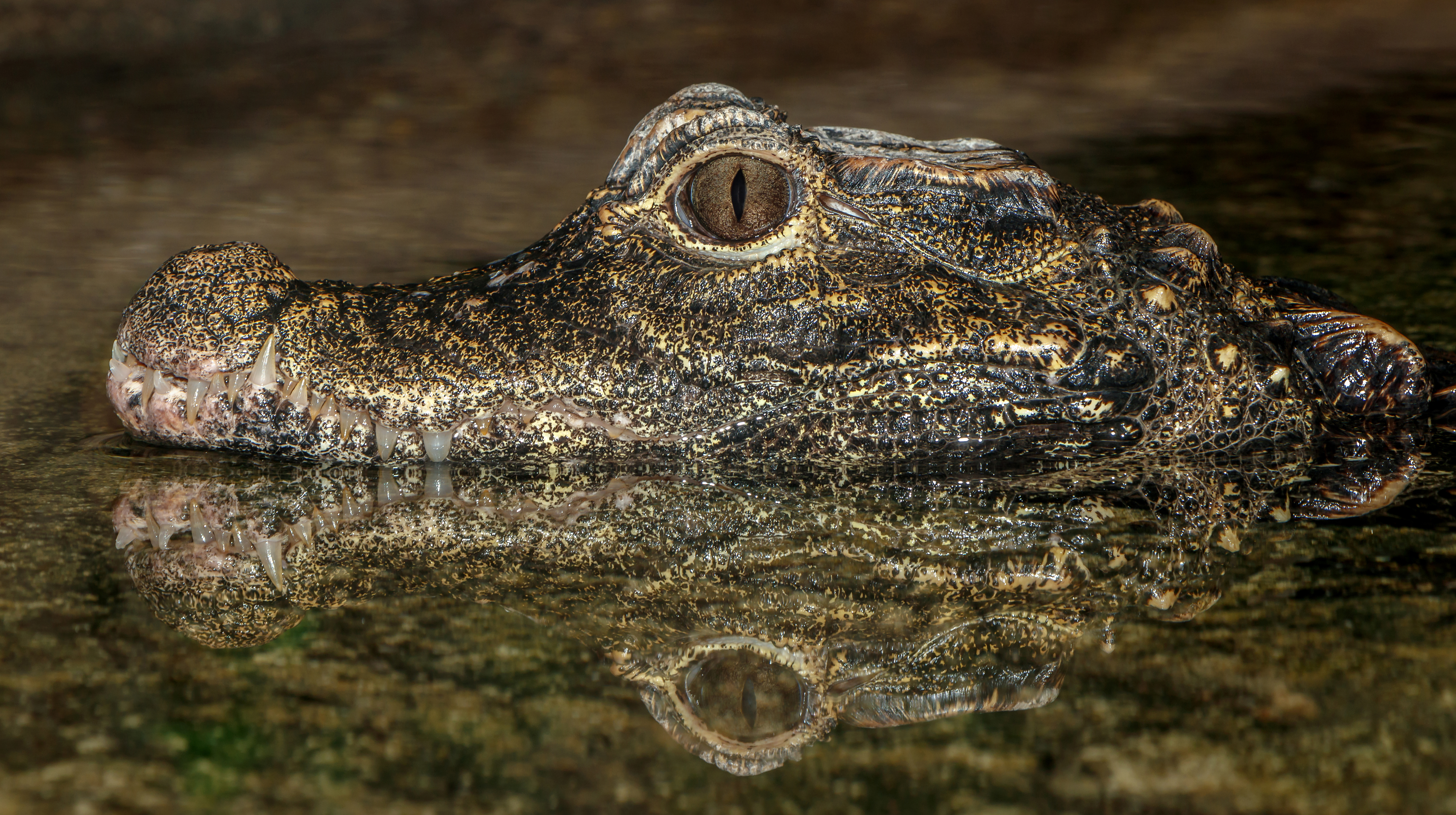
A Dwarf crocodile

The Diécké Classified Forest forms part of the Western Guinean Lowland forests, south of Nzérékoré, sharing this region with neighbouring countries Sierra Leone and Liberia. It is considered a major site for biodiversity in Africa and the WWF notes "outstanding biological importance" in the area. Its wildlife includes 141 species of birds, with suggestions that more could be found, as well as endemic fauna such as the Dwarf crocodile, the Bay duiker and species of endangered primates such as the Diana monkey, and Western Red colobus.

This area is split into evergreen and deciduous forests and contains plant species unique to the area. Its forest composition is mainly lowland mature rainforest, with swamps in some regions. It has heavy rainfall with this region receiving 1900-3000mm of rainfall each year, making it one of the wettest parts of West Africa. Human activity has also disturbed the ecological region due to previous slash-and-burn farming, logging and mining activities. Despite the Diécké Classified Forest being used for logging, swamp-forest regions have hindered commercial exploitation due to its difficulty of access.

== 2014 Ebola outbreak ==
The origin of the 2014 Ebola outbreak has been traced back to Forested Guinea: it was the first country in Western Africa to record an Ebola virus outbreak. The initial case of the outbreak was attributed to a 2-year-old boy located in Meliandou, Guéckédou Prefecture with the Zaire strain of Ebola who died 6 December 2013. This subsequently spread to neighbouring countries Liberia and Sierra Leone due to the village's proximity to their borders and the free flow of people between the three countries. Ebola also spread to Conakry from Guéckédou, the first urban area in Guinea to be affected, with the first case recorded on 17 March 2014.

The Ebola Crisis affected 3811 people in total in Guinea. Guinea was declared "Ebola-free" in its entirety in December 2015; however, on 17 March 2016, Nzérékoré recorded two additional cases of Ebola.

=== Impact on healthcare system ===
The Forest Region was one of the regions most severely affected by the Ebola crisis, and the weakened healthcare system had incidental effects such as reducing treatment attendance, increased used sub-standard drugs and distrust towards the healthcare system. The Ebola crisis was said to have "brought a number of additional burdens" to the healthcare system in Forested Guinea. There was a noted decrease in attendance to outpatient clinics and reduction in hospital revenue which weakened the financial stability of healthcare institutions. The impact was also witnessed in the decline of non-ebola-related treatment programs for diseases such as malaria and AIDS, which raised the threat of other health problems.

=== Social resistance to healthcare ===
Researchers observed social resistance to Ebola treatment in Forested Guinea, which exacerbated the outbreak's impact at the beginning. Social practices such as burials and caring for patients were associated with 60% of infections. The cultural practices surrounding mortuary rites such as preparing the body of the deceased, and exhumations conflicted with the Ebola treatment centres' control of the body. This caused tension between foreign humanitarian aid and patients' families, which manifested in violent attacks towards Médecins Sans Frontières, as well as physical barricades put in place by the local population near villages to prevent access.

Other cultural aspects such as belief in sorcery contributed further to the resistance. Behaviour such as seclusion and anti-social conduct sparked suspicion. Both foreign and community members could be viewed as sorcerers, and due to the negative connotations were ostracised. This negative perception towards those sorcery consequently sparked anger at Ebola treatment centres, which advocated anti-social behaviour to prevent the spread of Ebola.

== Gallery ==
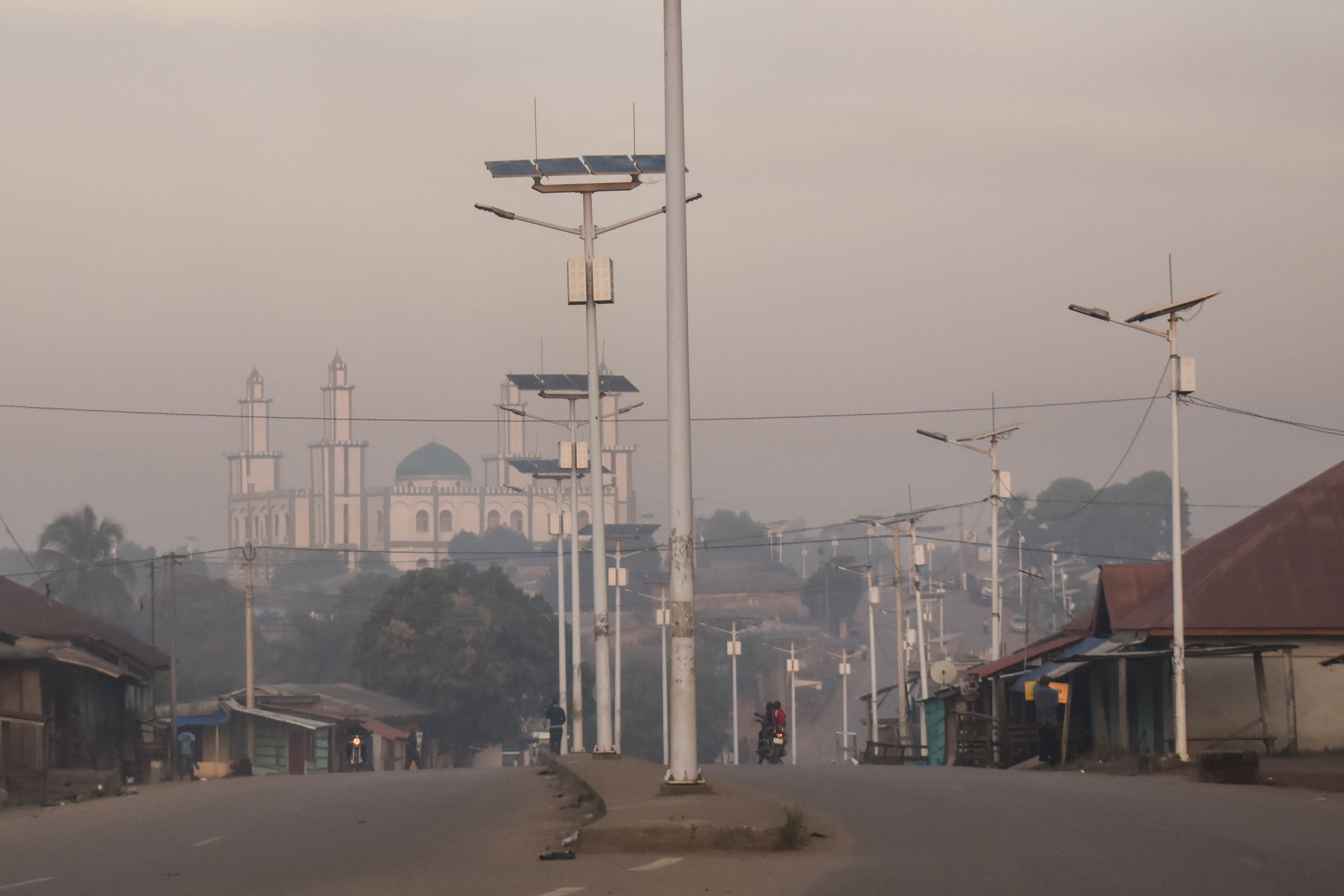
N'Zérékoré city

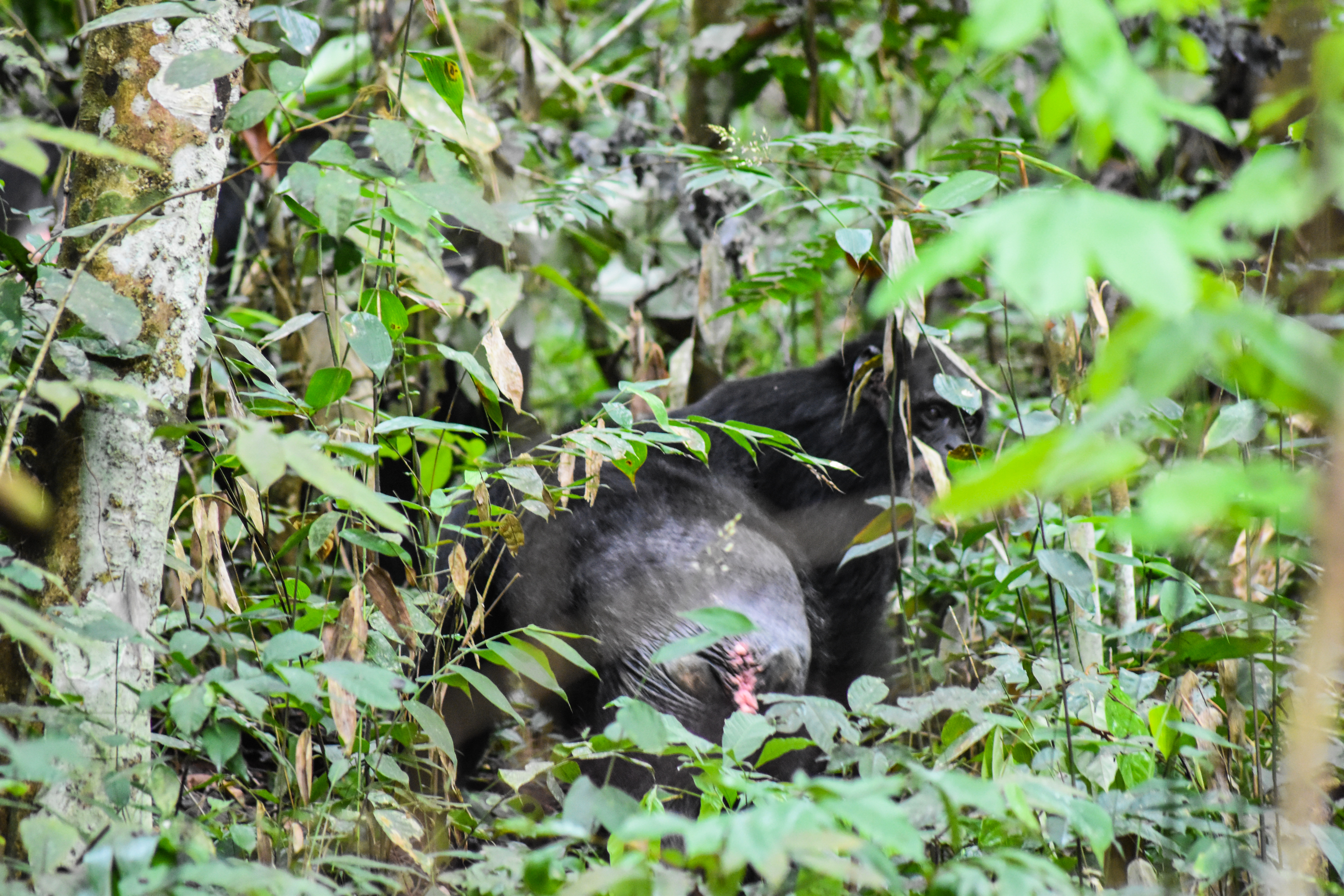
Chimpanzees (Mount Nimba)

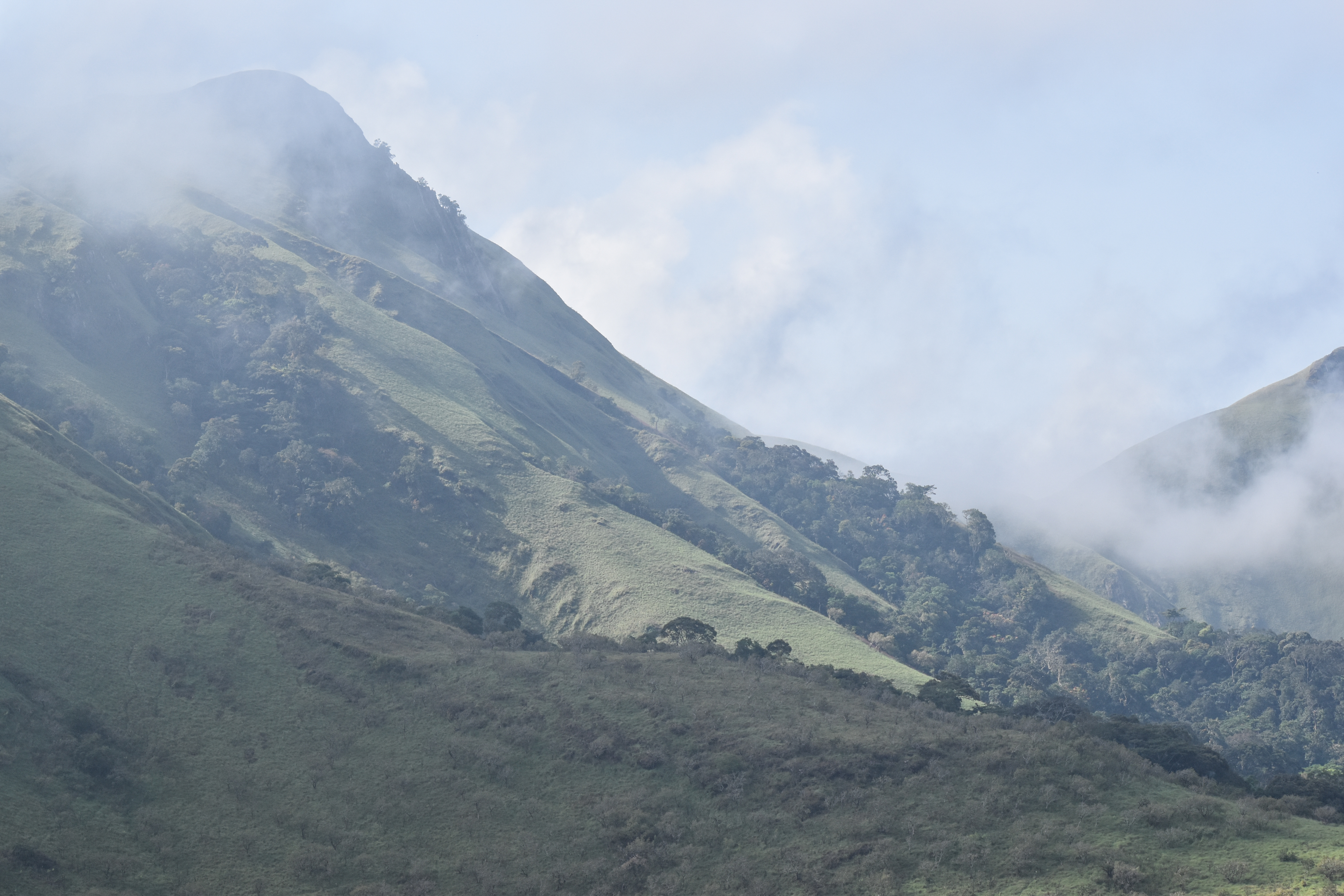
Mount Nimba

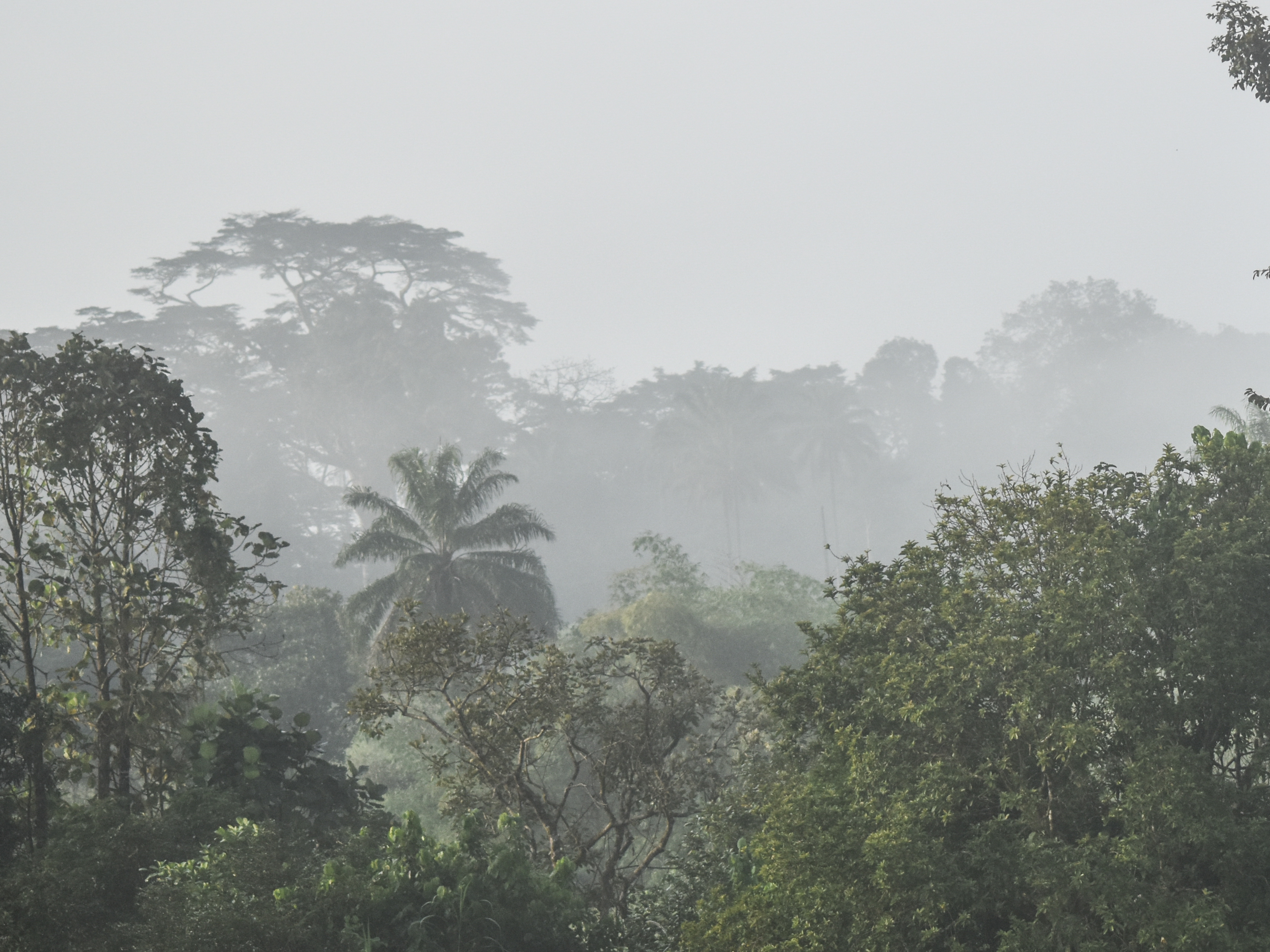
Ziama Massif

== See also ==
- Mount Nimba Strict Nature Reserve
- Ziama Massif
- Bossou
