= Abacetus liberianus =

Scientific classification
- Kingdom: Animalia
- Phylum: Arthropoda
- Class: Insecta
- Order: Coleoptera
- Suborder: Adephaga
- Family: Carabidae
- Genus: Abacetus
- Species: A. liberianus

Binomial name
- Abacetus liberianus Tschitscherine, 1899

Species of beetle

Abacetus liberianus is a species of ground beetle in the subfamily Pterostichinae. It was described by Tschitscherine in 1899. The species is found in West Africa, with recorded occurrences in the Mount Nimba Strict Nature Reserve on the borders of Liberia, Guinea, and Côte d'Ivoire.
