= Yeiyei =

Scientific classification
- Kingdom: Animalia
- Phylum: Arthropoda
- Subphylum: Chelicerata
- Class: Arachnida
- Order: Araneae
- Infraorder: Araneomorphae
- Family: Salticidae
- Genus: Yeiyei; Wesołowska & Henrard, 2025
- Species: Y. guiparkeri

Binomial name
- Yeiyei guiparkeri Wesołowska & Henrard, 2025

Species of spider

Yeiyei is a monotypic genus of spiders in the family Salticidae containing the single species, Yeiyei guiparkeri.

== Distribution ==
Yeiyei guiparkeri has been recorded from Guinea.

== Etymology ==
The genus is named after the type locality, Yeï Forest. The species honors Guy Parker, who organized the expeditions to the Nimba Mountains.
