= Ziama Massif =

Mountain range in Guinea

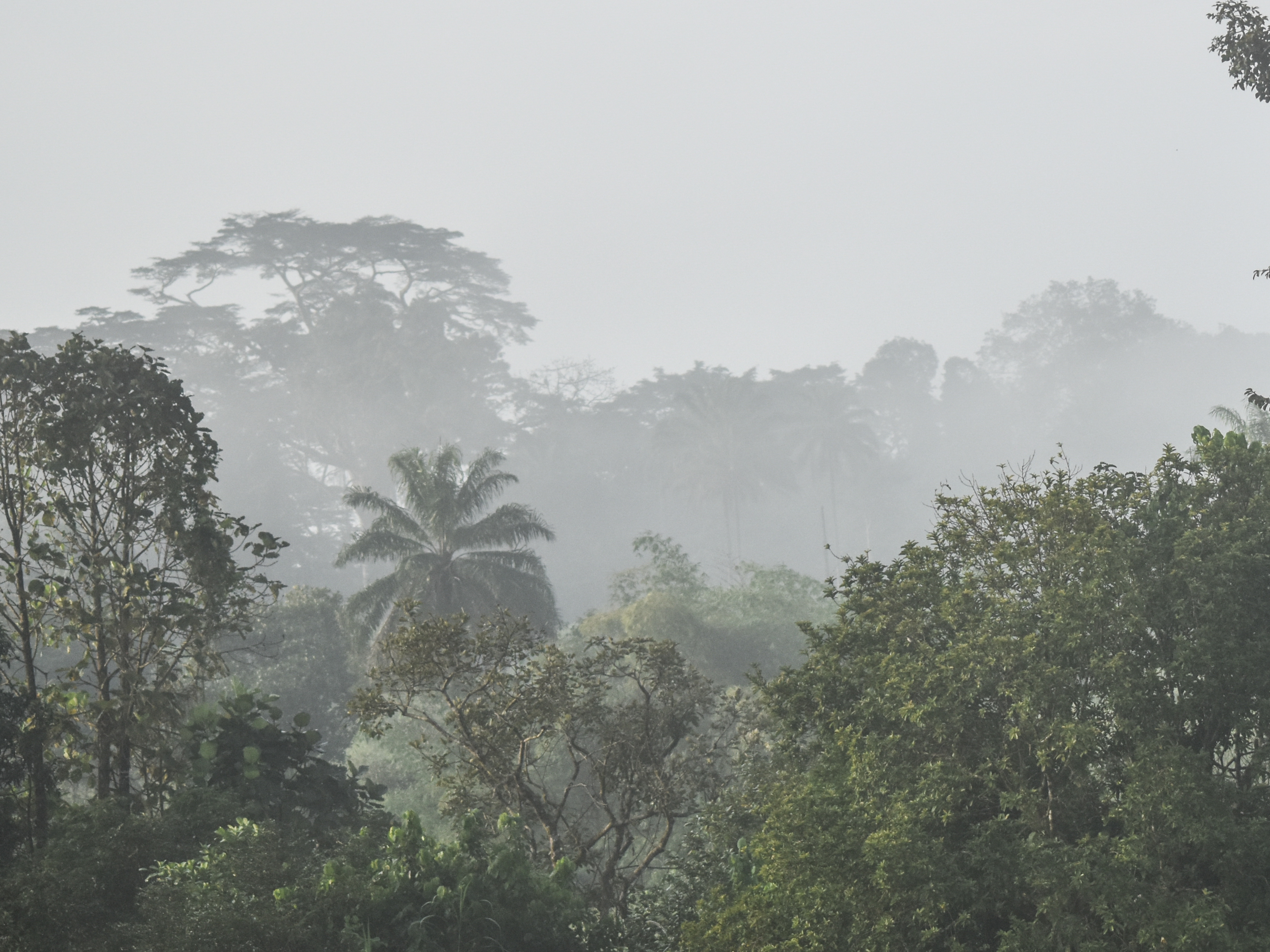

- Location within Guinea
- Interactive map of Ziama Massif
- Location: Nzérékoré Region, Guinea
- Coordinates: 8.24°N 9.36°W
- Area: 1,162 km^{2} (449 sq mi)
- Established: 1932

The Ziama Massif is a forested mountain range and nature reserve in the Nzérékoré Region of south-eastern Guinea.

== Geography ==
The Ziama Massif extends from north-east to south-west, continuing southwards into Liberia as the Kpo Range. The eastern slopes are drained by the Saint Paul River, and the western slopes by the Lofa River; both rivers drain south-west through Liberia to empty into the Atlantic Ocean. The highest points of the massif reach almost 1,400 m above sea level. The forested landscape includes valleys, plateaus, rounded ridges, rocky peaks, sheer cliffs and granite outcrops. The reserve covers an area of 116,170 ha, some 60,000 ha of which is the core, surrounded by a buffer zone. Annual rainfall ranges between 1,700–2,000 mm.

=== Environment ===
The Ziama Massif is part of the Guinean montane forests ecoregion, and harbours a flora and fauna distinct from the surrounding lowlands. It was designated a nature reserve in 1932 and approved as a Biosphere Reserve by UNESCO in 1980, covering 1,161.70 km². It is considered a relict of the diminishing Upper Guinean forest formation. The Biosphere Reserve is home to more than 1,300 species of plants and more than 500 species of animals. Some 287 kinds of birds have been recorded in the reserve, which has been designated an Important Bird Area (IBA) by BirdLife International because it supports significant populations of many species.

== Gallery ==
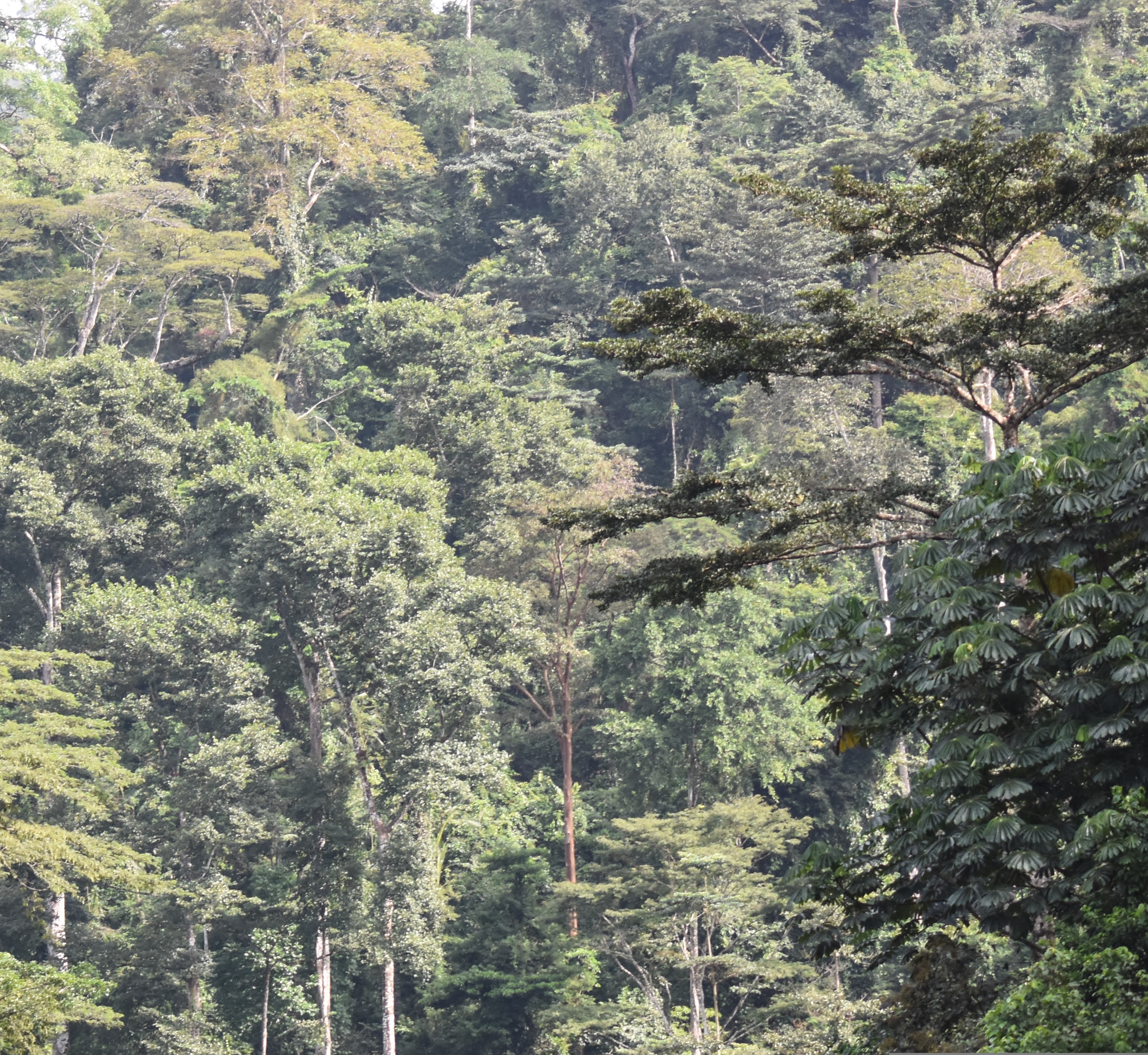
Montane rainforest near to Sérédou (Northern limit of Ziama Massif).

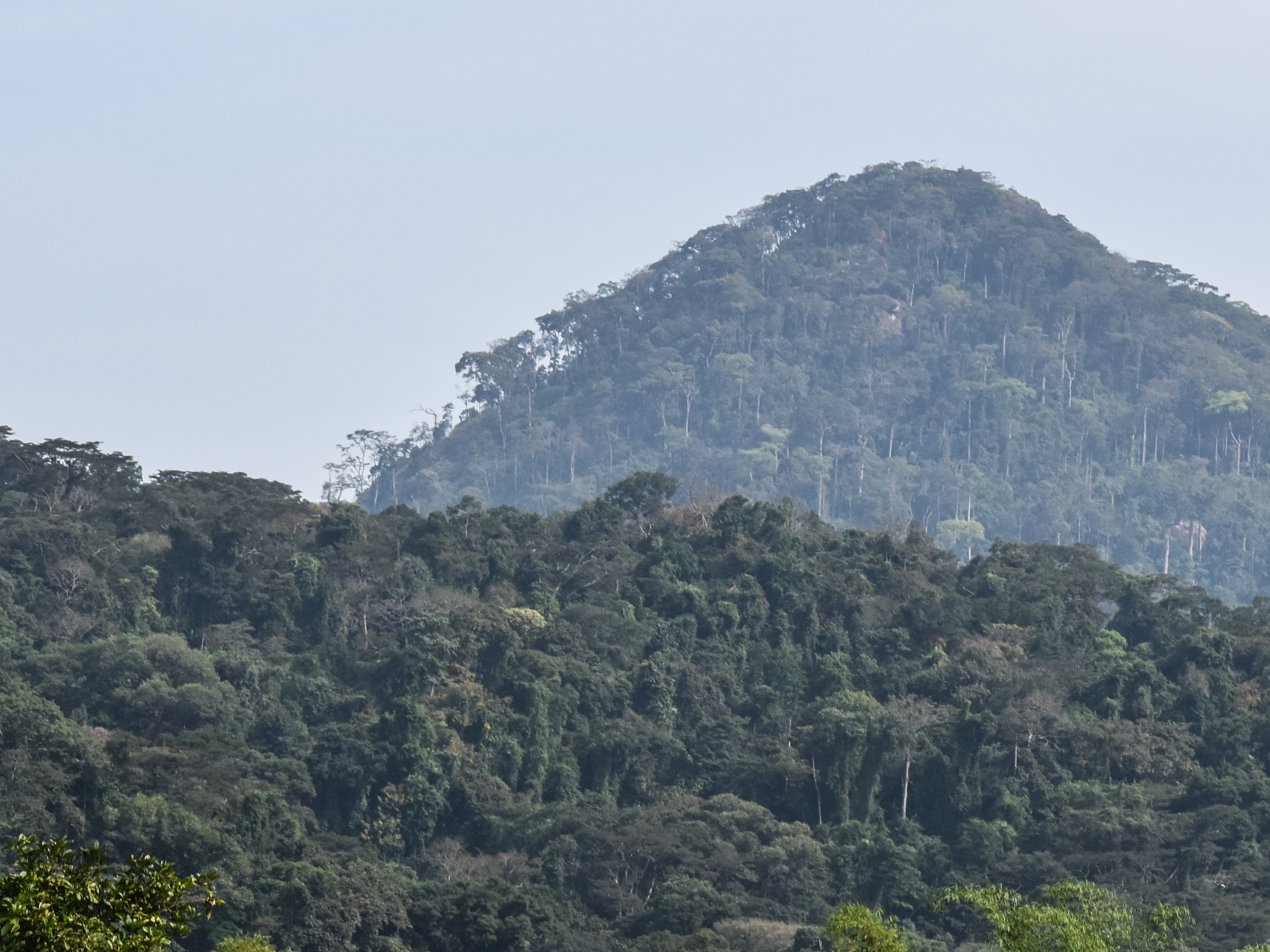
Mountains near to Sérédou.

== See also ==
- Wildlife of Guinea
- Forest Guinea
