= Mount Nimba Strict Nature Reserve =

Protected area in Guinea and Côte d'Ivoire

- IUCN category Ia (strict nature reserve)
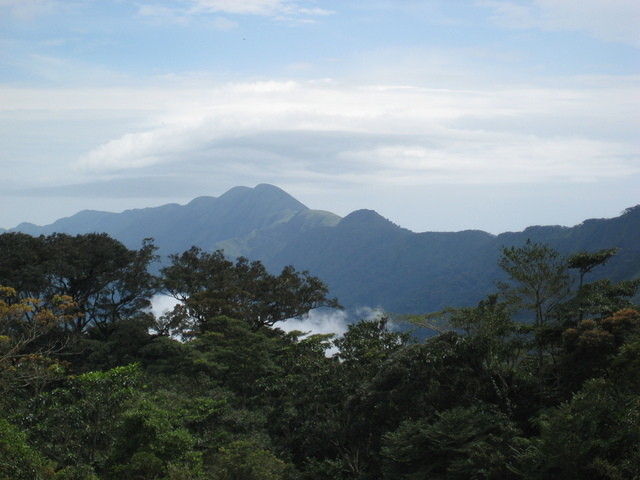
- Mount Nimba landscape

- Location within Guinea
- Location: Guinea and Côte d'Ivoire
- Nearest city: Yekepa, Bossou, N'Zoo
- Coordinates: 7°38′16″N 8°25′14″W
- Area: 175.4 km^{2} (43,300 acres)
- Established: 1944

UNESCO World Heritage Site
- Type: Natural
- Criteria: ix, x
- Designated: 1981 (5th session)
- Reference no.: 155
- Region: Africa
- Endangered: 1992–present
- Extension: 1982

Mount Nimba Strict Nature Reserve (French: Réserve naturelle intégrale du Mont Nimba) is a protected area and UNESCO World Heritage Site located in both Guinea and Côte d'Ivoire, extending over a total of area of 175.4 km^{2} (43,300 acres), with 125.4 km^{2} (31,000 acres) in Guinea, and 50 km^{2} (12,000 acres) in Côte d'Ivoire. The reserve covers significant portions of the Nimba Range, a geographically unique area with unusually rich flora and fauna, including exceptional numbers of single-site endemic species, such as Nimbaphrynoides (a genus of viviparous toads), the Nimba otter shrew, and multiple species of horseshoe bats. Its highest peak is Mount Richard-Molard at 1,752 m (5,750 ft), which is the highest peak of both countries.

== History ==
The strict nature reserve was established in 1943 by Order No. 4190 SE/F in Côte d'Ivoire and in 1944 by decree in Guinea. The Guinean part was accepted as a biosphere reserve in 1980. Both reserves were combined to form one World Heritage Site in 1981 (Guinea) and 1982 (Côte d'Ivoire) because of its outstanding biodiversity and unique mosaic of tropical habitats. Iron-ore exploration for mining in the most vulnerable montane zone started in 1992, and the reserve has been listed as a World Heritage Site in danger since then. For the sake of an improved protection, a conservation management centre is being built by Guinean Parks Foundation. The project was approved by the Guinean Government and CEGENS in 2016.

== Geography ==
The Nimba Range is a narrow ridge extending approximately 40 km long, with an orientation of northeast–southwest; it forms a part of the southern extent of the Guinea Highlands. Its highest peak is Mount Richard-Molard at 1,752 m (5,750 ft). Other peaks include Grand Rochers at 1694 m (5558 ft), Mont Sempéré at 1682 m (5518 ft), Mont Piérré Richaud at 1670 m (5479 ft), Mont Tô at 1675 m (5495 ft), and Mont LeClerc 1577 m (5174 ft). All of them are located in the Guinean part of the reserve. There are about fifty springs, including the origins of the Cavally, Cestos, and Sassandra Rivers. Mining of top-quality iron-ore poses the major threat to the unique geomorphology and wildlife.

== Climate ==
The Nimba Range has a sub-equatorial montane climate. Temperature changes extremely with altitude, with a daytime maximum ranging between 24 °C and 33 °C, and the nightly minimum can fall below 10 °C. Some parts of the reserve receive significantly less precipitation, due to rain-shadow effect of the high ridge. In general, southern slopes are moister than the leeward northern ones, which are affected by dry Harmattan wind from the Sahara. The Nimba Range, as well as the reserve, has exceptional microclimatic diversity.

== Ecology ==
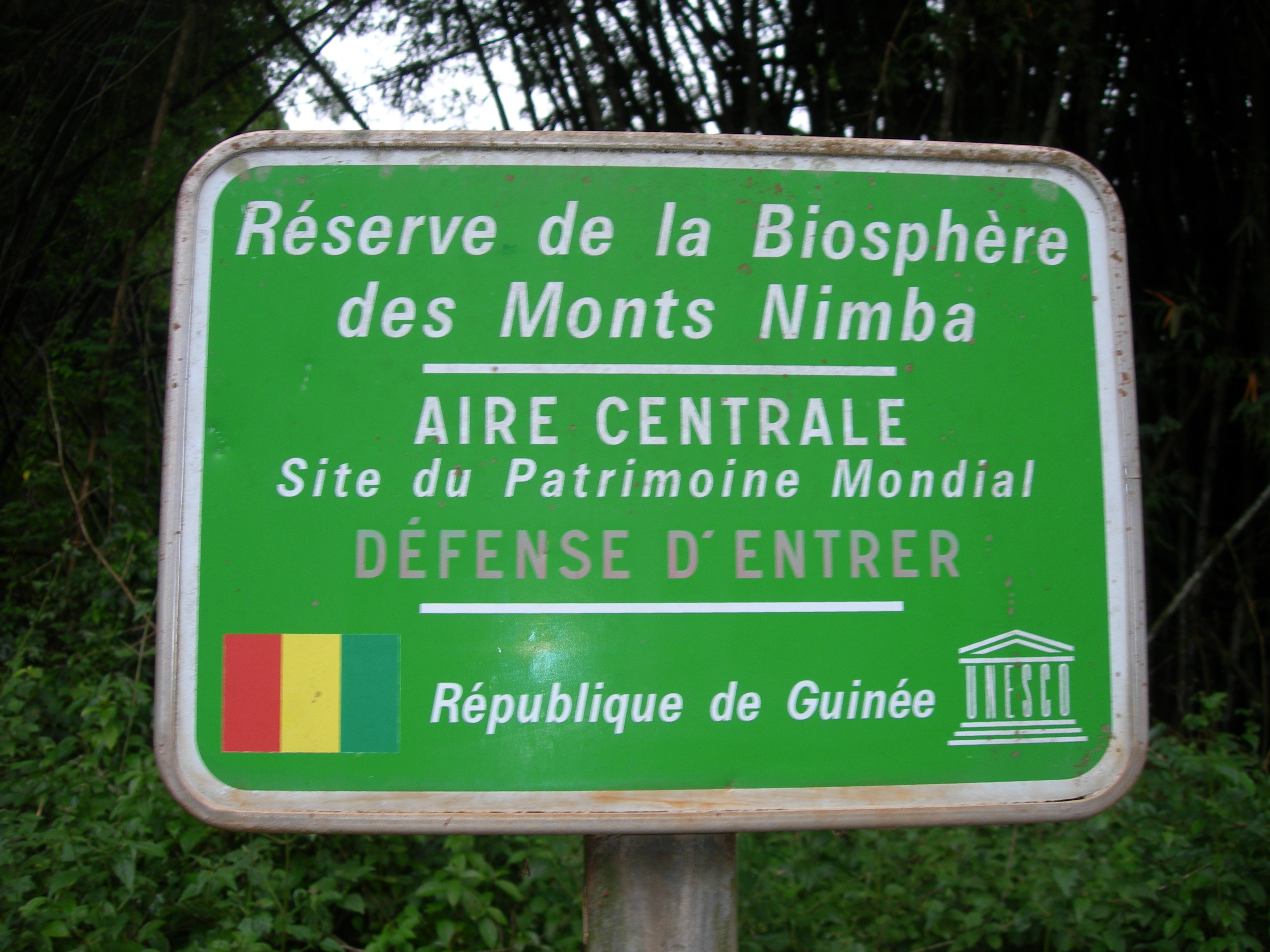
Mount Nimba Strict Nature Reserve

Mount Nimba Strict Nature Reserve lies within the Guinean Forests of West Africa Biodiversity Hotspot. It harbours an especially rich flora and fauna, and it is the home of more than 2000 vascular plant species, 680 vertebrate species, 132 of which are mammals, and to more than 2,500 invertebrate species. The reserve is a subject of biological surveys, because there are still large numbers of unknown species. Vertebrates endemic to the reserve include the Nimba viviparous toad, Lamotte's roundleaf bat, and Nimba otter shrew. Other rare and endangered animals found within the reserve include the West African lion, pygmy hippopotamus, zebra duiker, and a population of western chimpanzee that use stones for tools. The reserve has been designated an Important Bird Area (IBA) by BirdLife International because it supports significant populations of many bird species.

Terrestrial ecoregions within the reserve include Western Guinean lowland forest, Guinean montane forest, Guinean forest-savanna mosaic, and West Sudanian savanna. The Nimba Range is a part of a distinct freshwater ecoregion with a high portion of endemic aquatic species.

Terrestrial vegetation varies with altitude and cardinal orientation.

- The mountain is isolated from other sky islands of Forest Guinea by the lowland West Sudanian savanna and Guinean forest-savannah mosaic. Savanna habitats are broken by gallery forests and closed canopy forest islands.
- The lowland foothills are covered by the Western Guinean Lowland Forest up to 600 meters. The characteristic forest type is semi-deciduous high forest with a main canopy and an emergent layer. There are 40-70 tree species found in a single hectare, and up to 500 forest tree species recorded in the area.
- Guinean Montane Forests are located between 600 and 1200–1400 meters. At lower levels, semi-deciduous high forests extend up to 900 meters; they are poorer in species compared to lowlands. Short dry forests can be found in the eastern end of the ridge. From 900 meters altitude, where the mountain is covered by clouds almost most of the year, mossy forests are present, which can be divided into three types: Parinari exclesa forests (1), summit forests (2), and tree fern forests in the valleys where groundwater is abundant (3). Above the tree zone, there is a transition of Protea bushland to grassland.
- Isolated high-altitude grassland extends from 1200 to 1400 meters to the highest peaks. There, the most famous endemic vertebrates are the Nimba viviparous toad (Nimbaphrynoides occidentalis), and the Lamotte's roundleaf bat (Hipposideros lamottei), the latter recorded from only one mining site. Endemic plants include among others Asplenium schnellii, Osbeckia porteresii and Blaeria nimbana.

== Tourism ==
Mount Nimba lies in a remote region along the tri-national border of Guinea, Côte d'Ivoire, and Liberia, far from their capital cities. In fact, the Liberian third of the ridge is seriously degraded, thanks to the former intense mining, while the Guinean part has remained ecologically intact and natural.

== Trivia ==
One of the four honey buzzards of Kempen-Broek that are equipped with GPS trackers passed this national park on 13 November 2013.

== Gallery ==
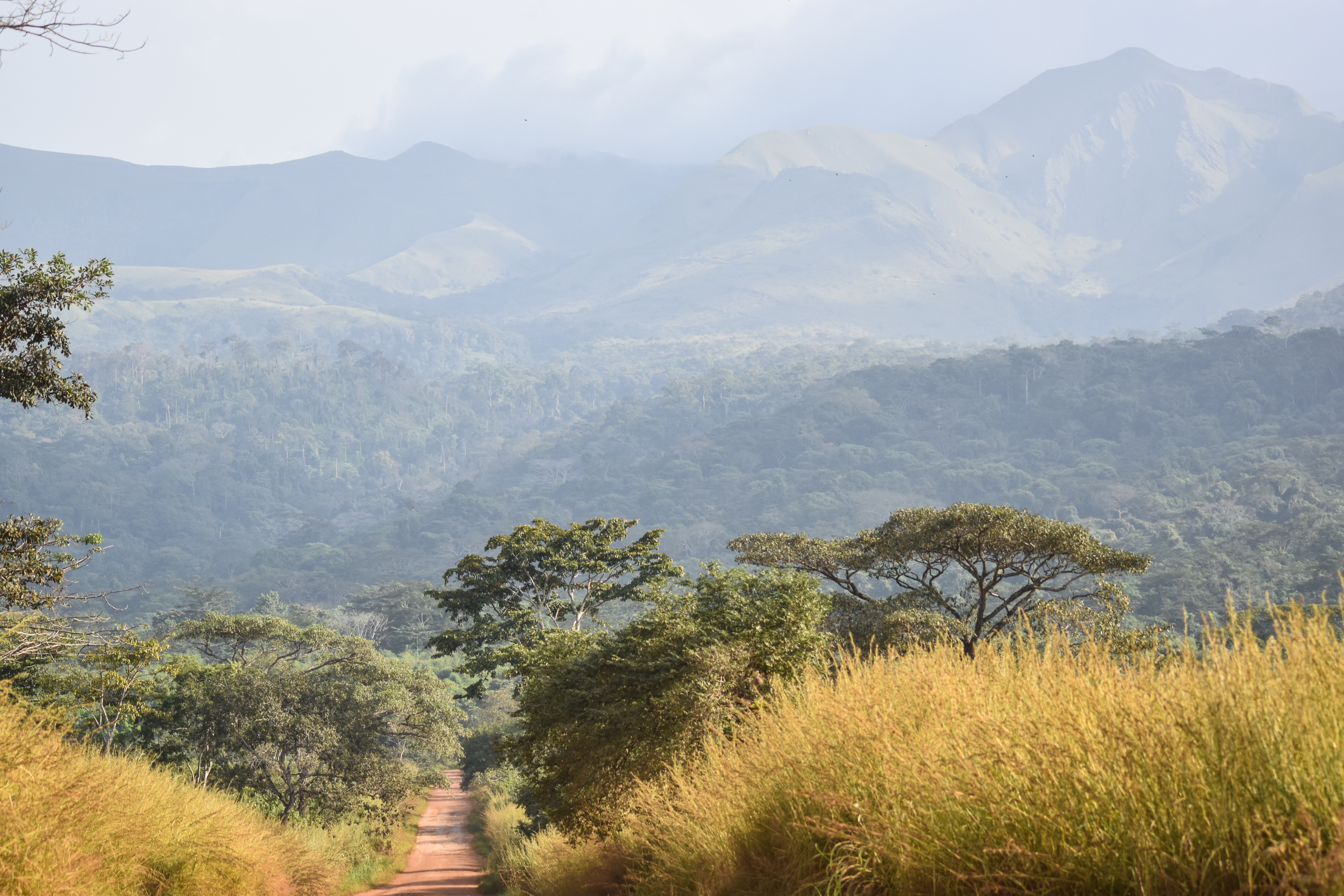
Border of the reserve (Gbakore)

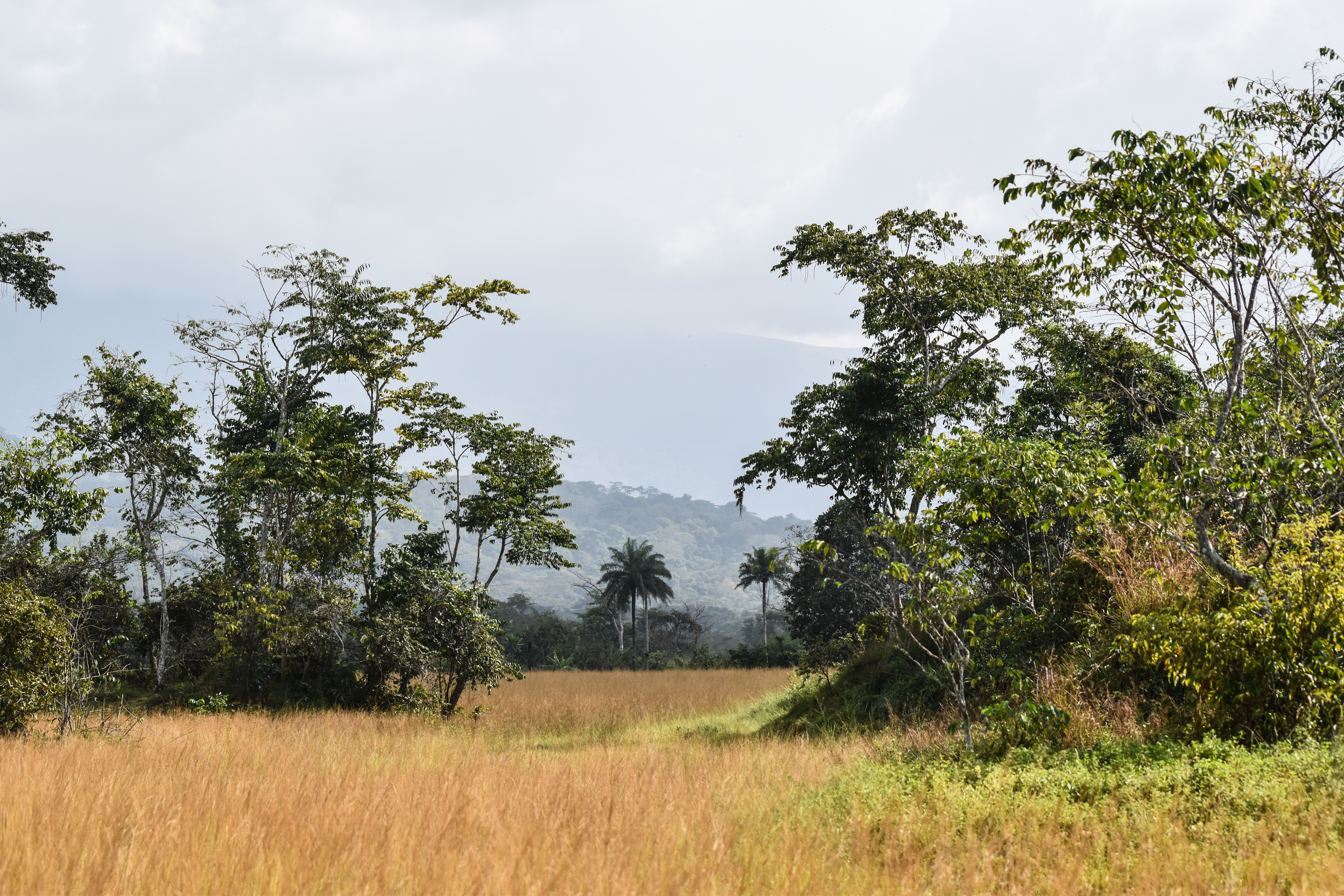
Lowland savanna around Mount Nimba

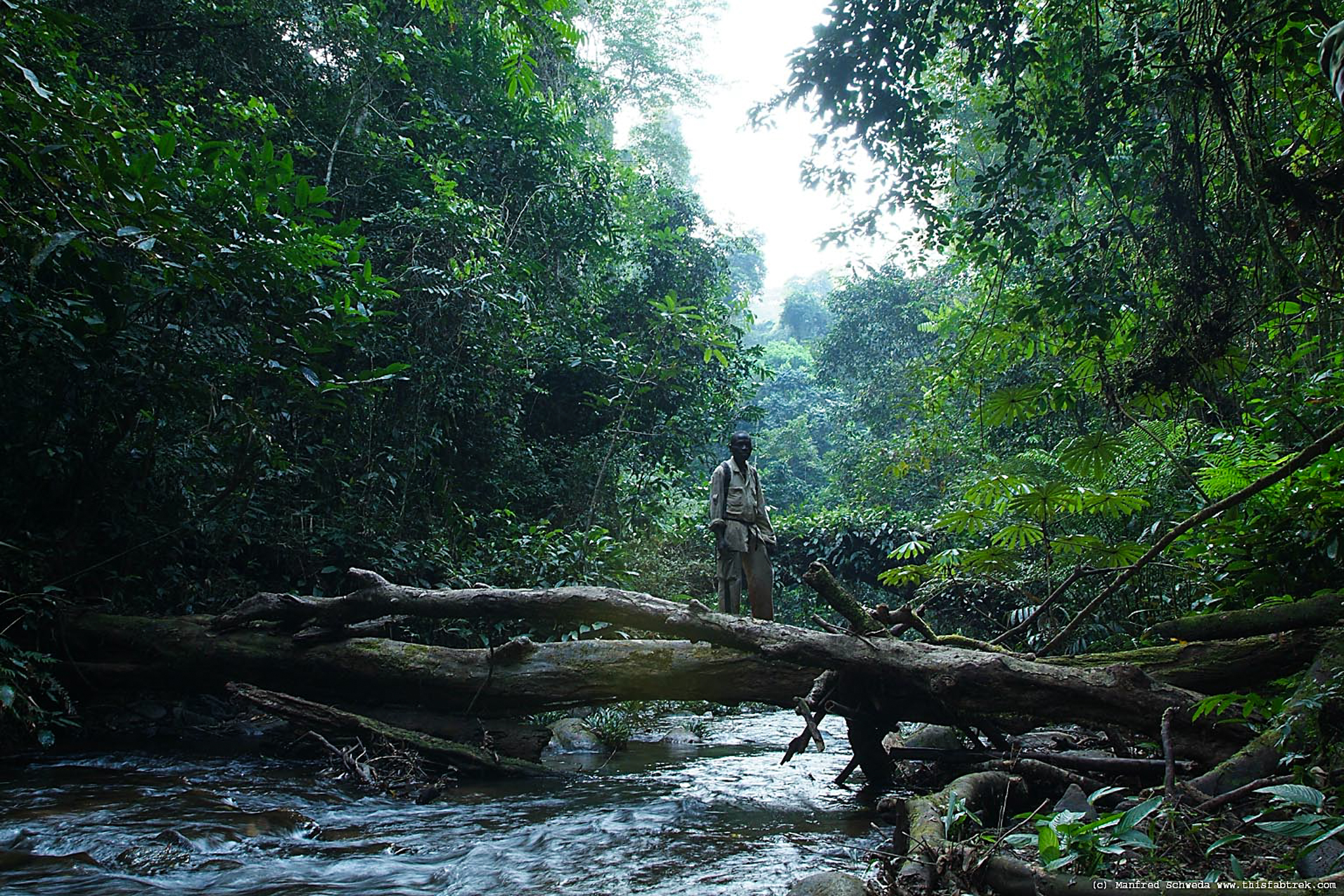
Lowland rainforest

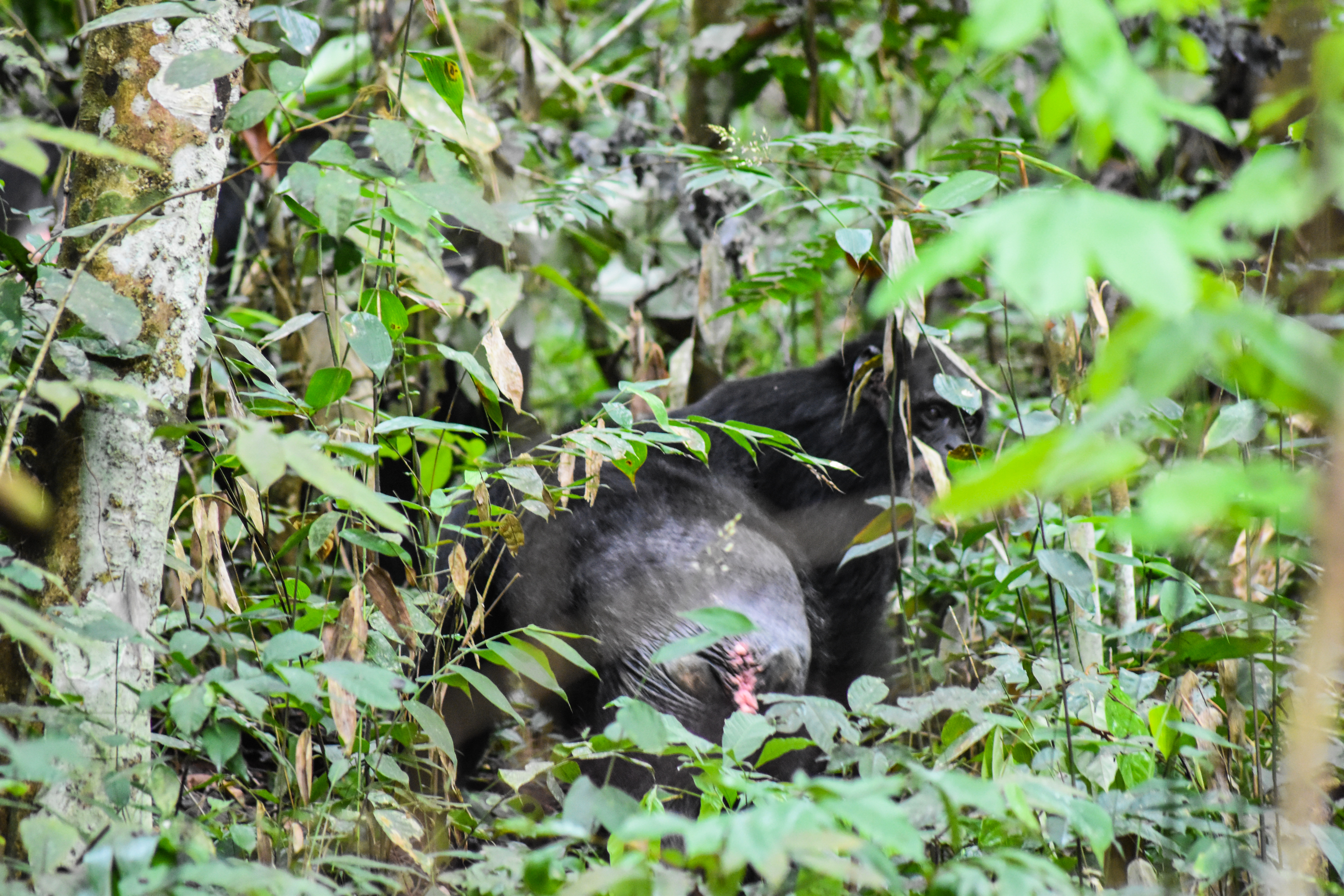
Western chimpanzees

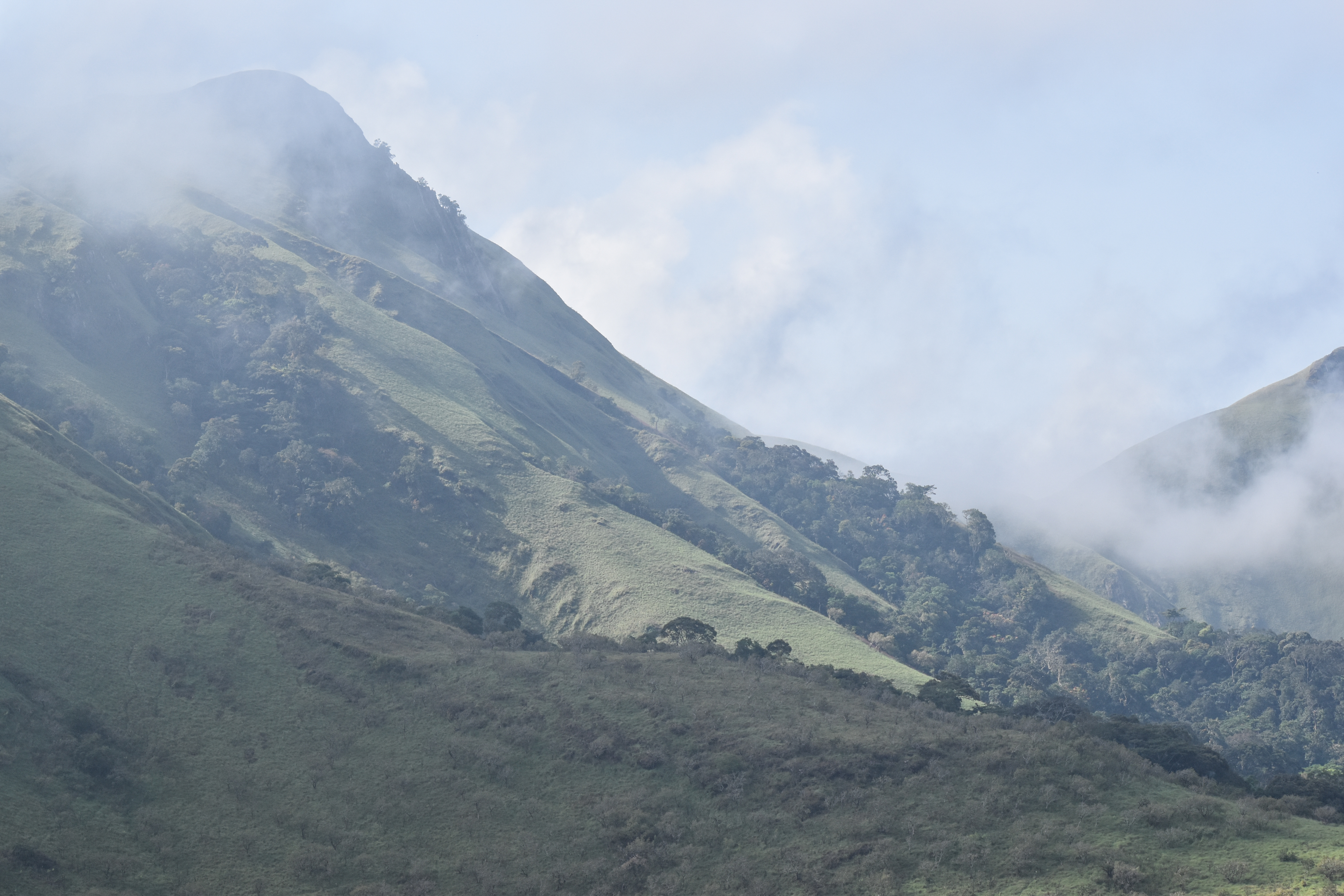
Montane cloud forest

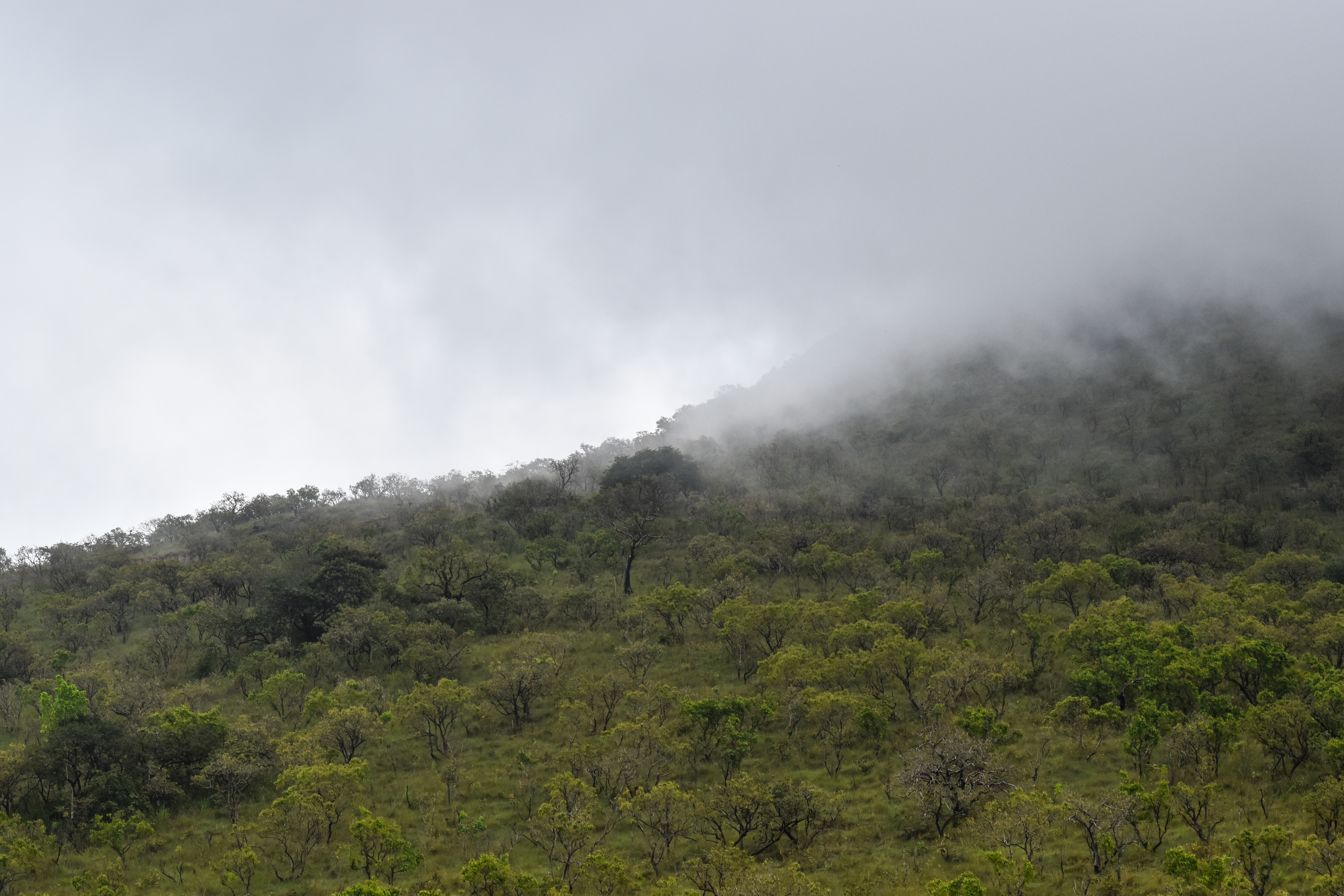
Montane Protea bushland

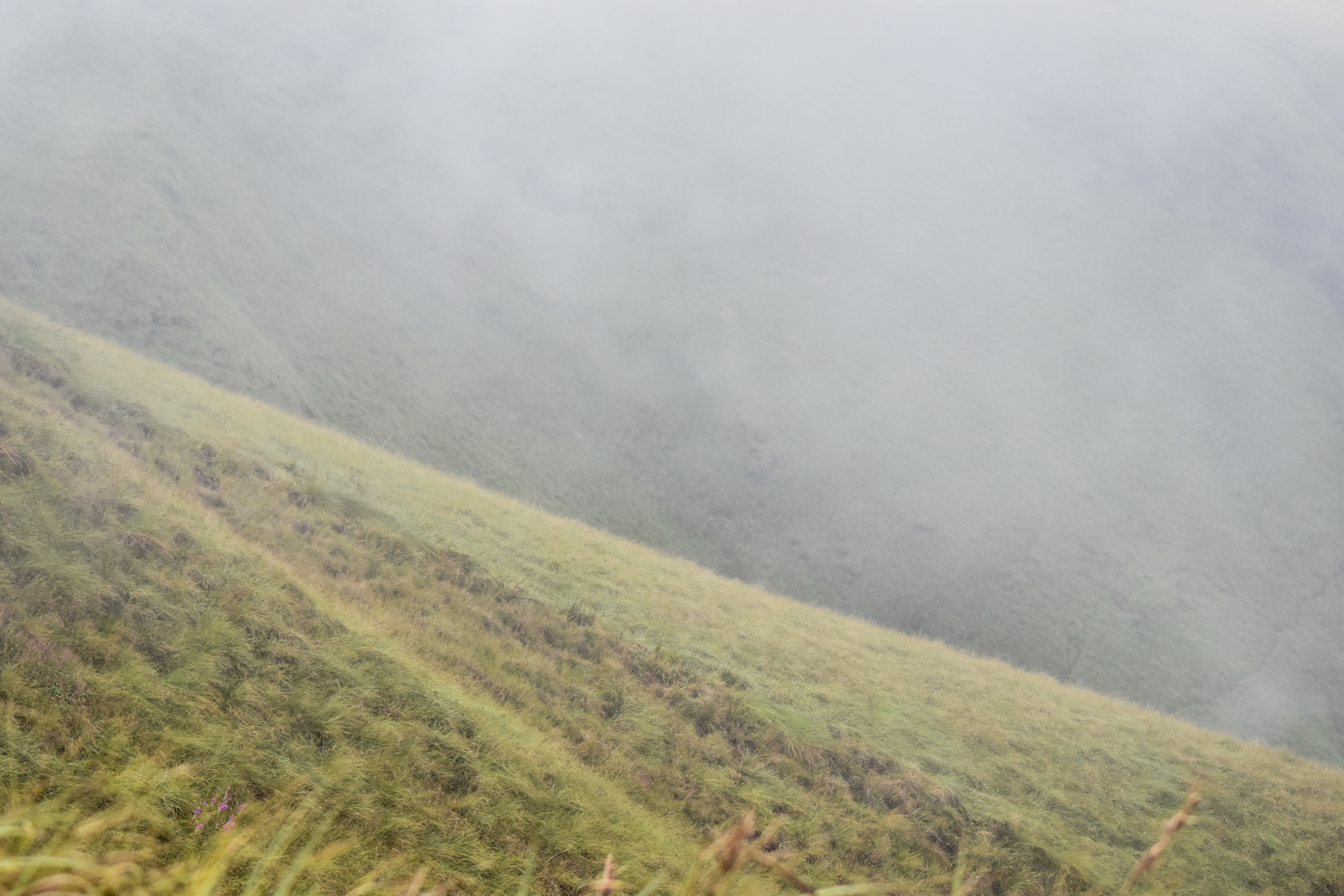
Montane grassland

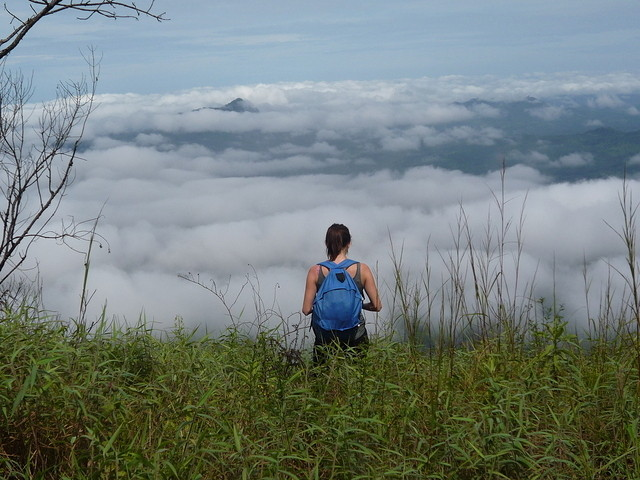
A tourist above clouds

== See also ==
- Nimba Range
- Mount Richard-Molard
- Wildlife of Guinea
- Wildlife of Ivory Coast
- Forest Guinea
