= Nimba otter shrew =

Conservation status
- Vulnerable (IUCN 3.1)

Scientific classification
- Kingdom: Animalia
- Phylum: Chordata
- Class: Mammalia
- Order: Afrosoricida
- Suborder: Tenrecomorpha
- Family: Potamogalidae
- Genus: Micropotamogale
- Species: M. lamottei

Binomial name
- Micropotamogale lamottei Heim de Balsac, 1954
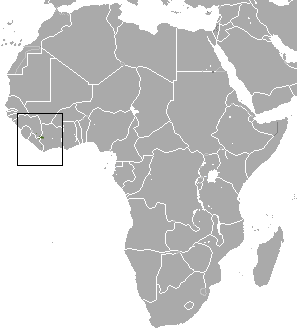
- Nimba otter shrew range

Species of mammal

The Nimba otter shrew (Micropotamogale lamottei) is a dwarf otter shrew and belongs to the mammal family Potamogalidae. Otter shrews are shrew-like afrotherian mammals found in sub-Saharan Africa. They are most closely related to the tenrecs of Madagascar. This species belongs to the genus Micropotamogale, literally meaning "tiny river weasel". It is native to the Mount Nimba area which rests along the border of Liberia, Guinea, and Côte d'Ivoire (Ivory Coast) in West Africa.

== Description ==
The Nimba otter shrew is a small-bodied mammal. Weighing only about 125 g (4.4 oz) it has a body length of 15–22 cm (5.9–8.7 in) with a quarter to a third of its body size being its tail. It has been described as a "miniature sea otter with a rat tail". Its pelage is long, hiding its ears and eyes, and almost always universally colored (usually brown, but black and gray otter shrews have been spotted).

== Evolution and life history ==
The Nimba otter shrew is classified as a member of Potamogalidae, which is related to afrotherian tenrecs, based on morphological structures. Molecular data also support the relationship. Unfortunately, due to heavy mining operations for iron ore in the Mount Nimba area, the fossil record is all but destroyed. It is also difficult for scientists to gain access because the mountain crosses the borders of three different countries.

== Ecology and behavior ==
The Nimba otter shrew is nocturnal and semiaquatic. It resides in soft soils around creek beds and streams. It is a solitary creature and has only been seen with other shrews during mating seasons and when a mother is nursing newly born young. The breeding pattern of the Nimba otter shrew is also unknown, but believed to be polygamous; as there have been no witnessed accounts of breeding in the wild and the Nimba otter shrew has not mated in captivity.

== Conservation status ==
The IUCN had listed the Nimba otter shrew as endangered in 1990, but in 2018 the status was changed to vulnerable. The species is confined to an area of less than 5,000 km² on Mount Nimba, which is currently fragmented due to mining and wetland rice agriculture. The mining operations also produce runoff into the creeks and streambeds that is highly toxic. The current population is decreasing at a rate of 1 per 10 km² (almost 500 otter shrews per year). Although an exact number is unknown at this time, there is believed to be less than 2500–3500 individuals in the wild; there are none in captivity. At this rate the Nimba otter shrew was predicted to be extinct between 2017 and 2020. The population within Liberia's East Nimba Nature Reserve was reported healthy in 2013. The species is also present in the Mount Nimba Strict Nature Reserve of Guinea and Côte d'Ivoire, but this reserve is adjacent to a mining operation and is not fully protected from poaching.
