= Mount Richard-Molard =

Mountain on the border between Ivory Coast and Guinea in West Africa

- Nyamba (Niemba) Tun - Mt. Nimba
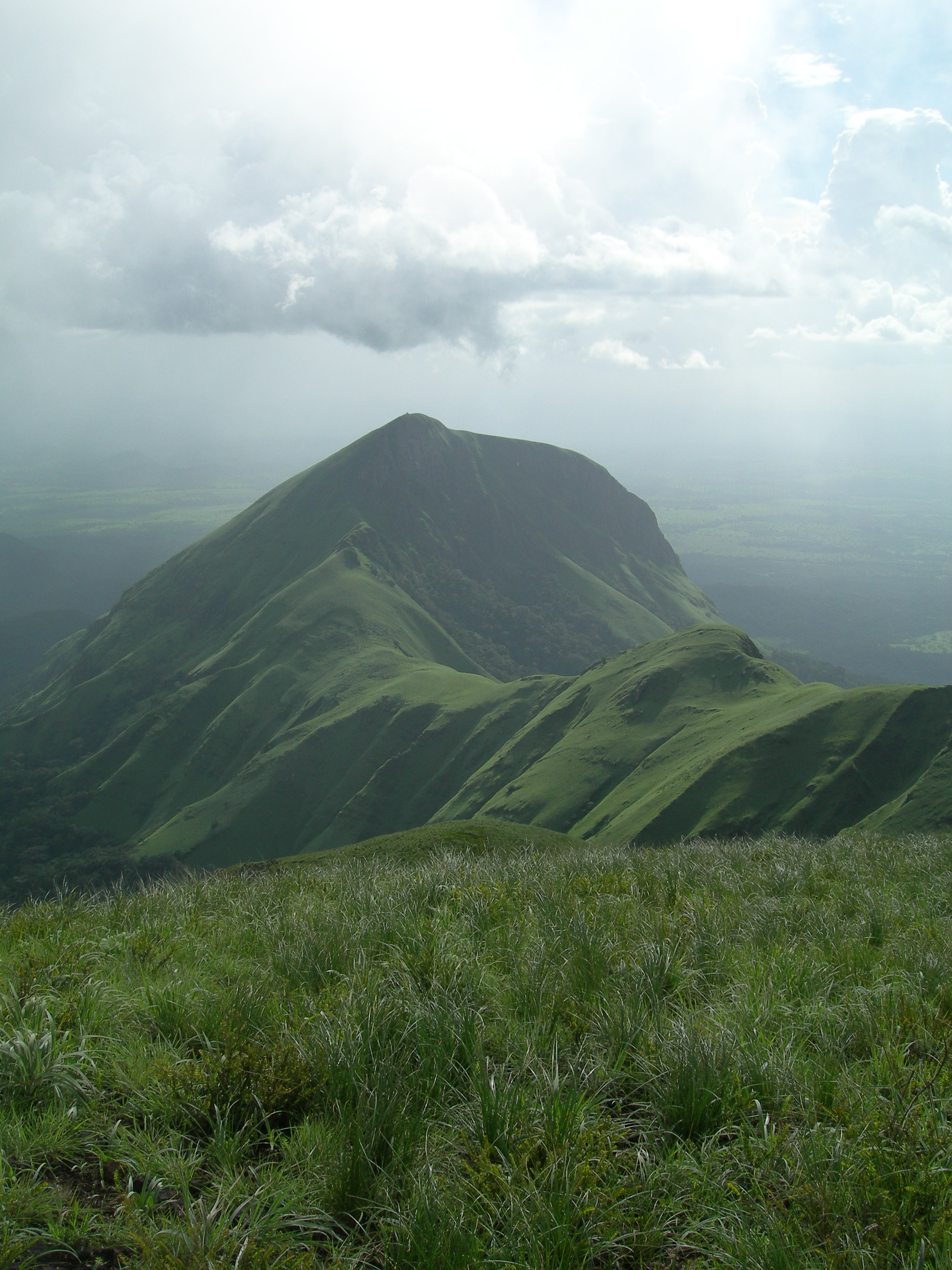
- Grass at the summit of Mount Richard-Molard

Highest point
- Elevation: 1,752 m (5,748 ft)
- Prominence: 1,294 m (4,245 ft)
- Listing: Country high point Ribu
- Coordinates: 7°37′21″N 8°24′20″W

Geography
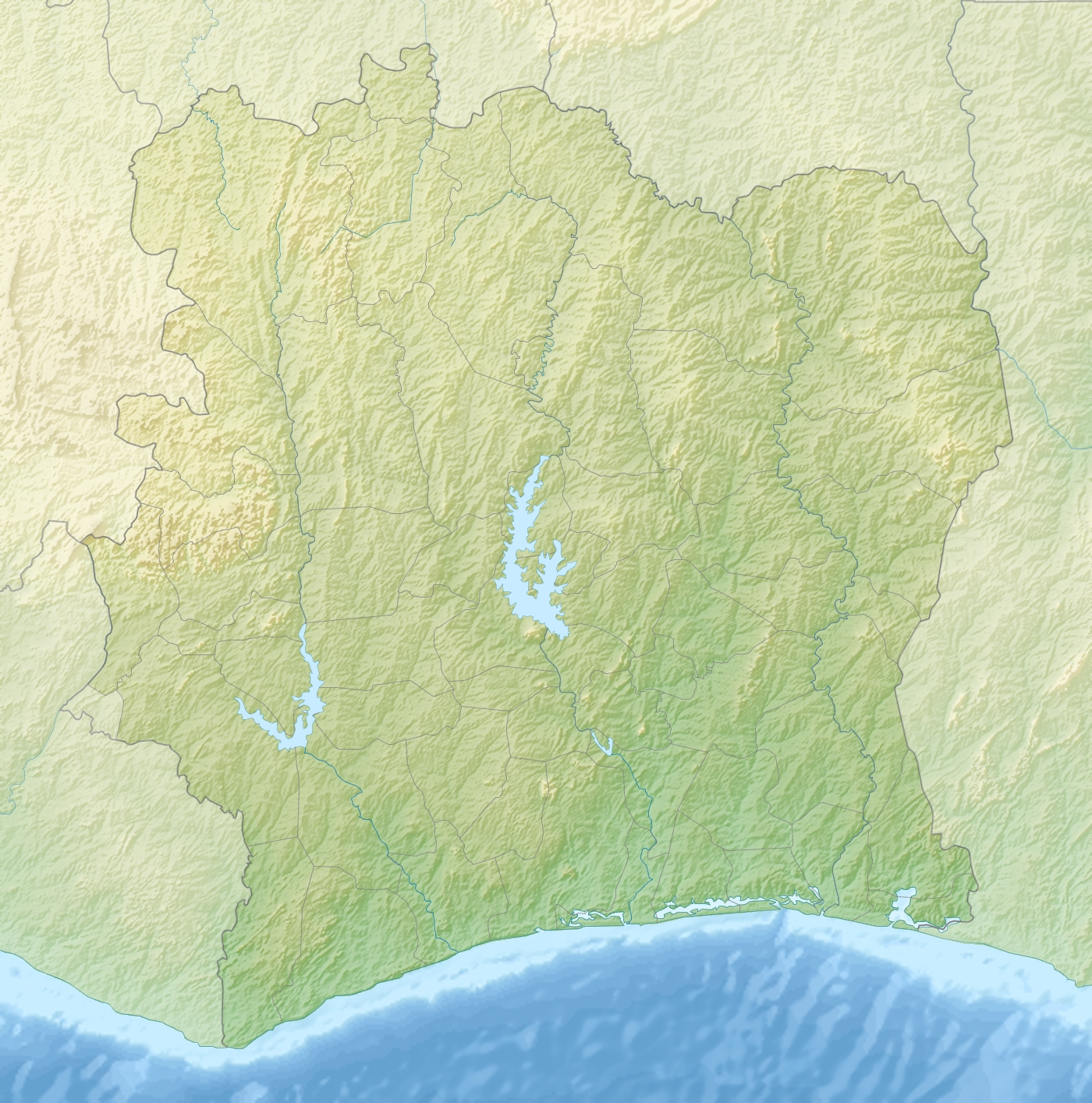
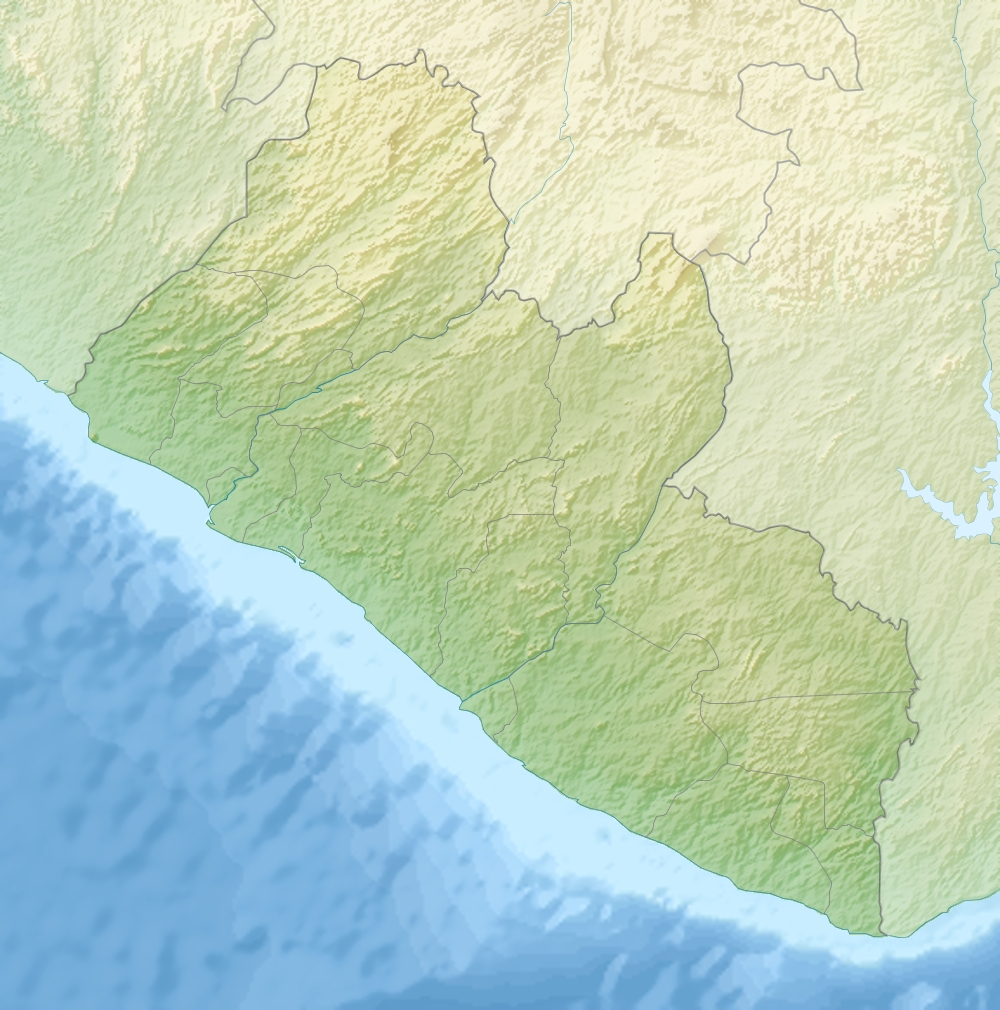
- Location within Ivory Coast Location within Liberia Location within Guinea
- Location: Liberia - Ivory Coast – Guinea
- Parent range: Nimba Range

Mount Richard-Molard is a mountain along the border of Guinea, Ivory Coast and Liberia in West Africa. The summit is on the border of Guinea and Ivory Coast and is the highest peak for both countries at 1,752 m (5,748 ft). The mountain is part of the Guinea Highlands, which straddles the borders between the three countries. The nearest major settlements are the town Yekepa in Liberia and the towns of Bossou and N'Zoo in Guinea.

== Toponymy ==
The mountain is named after the French geographer Jacques Richard-Molard, who died in an accident at the mountain site in 1951. Before that it was called Mount Nouon.

== Geology ==
The mountain is rich in iron ore and cobalt. The mix of iron rich quartzite sheets, schists and granite gneiss have characterised the geological pedogenesis.

== Conservation ==
Mount Richard-Molard lies within the Mount Nimba Strict Nature Reserve, which currently covers 17,540 hectares and straddles the borders of Guinea and Ivory Coast.

== World Heritage status ==
Mount Nimba Strict Nature Reserve is a site with outstanding universal value and was therefore nominated to the World Heritage List in 1981. It has been listed as World Heritage in Danger since 1992.

This site was added to Guinea's "Tentative List" for consideration for UNESCO World Heritage Site status on 29 March 2001, in the cultural category.

Mount Nimba Strict Nature Reserve has been listed as a World Heritage Site in both Guinea and Ivory Coast, under the criteria for natural heritage.

== See also ==
- Iron ore in Africa
- Mount Nimba Strict Nature Reserve
