= N'Zoo =

N'Zoo Nzo
- Sub-prefecture and town
- Location in Guinea
- Coordinates: 7°40′46″N 8°18′51″W
- Country: Guinea
- Region: Nzerekore Region
- Prefecture: Lola Prefecture

Population
  - Ethnicities: Kono
- Time zone: UTC+0 (GMT)

N'Zoo or Nzo is a town and sub-prefecture in the Lola Prefecture in the Nzérékoré Region of south-eastern Guinea.

It is situated at a few kilometers from the Mount Nimba Strict Nature Reserve.

== History ==
Before the arrival of the French, N'Zoo was a satellite village for Doromou. It started to gain importance when Princess Pokou of Doromou started a big market there. Later, in the early 20th century, the French also used N'Zoo as a base for trading in the region. Today N'Zoo is a small town, with basic services: a health center, a primary and a secondary school, a customs office and a police station.
