= Bossou =

- Sub-prefecture and town
- Location in Guinea
- Coordinates: 7°39′N 8°31′W
- Country: Guinea
- Region: Nzérékoré Region
- Prefecture: Lola Prefecture
- Time zone: UTC+0 (GMT)

Bossou is a town and sub-prefecture in the Lola Prefecture in the Nzérékoré Region of south-eastern Guinea. Much of the sub prefecture consists of the Mount Nimba Strict Nature Reserve. The Bossou Hills Reserve situated at the south-eastern limit of the city, which is famous for its chimpanzees habituated to humans, and make Bossou Hills the best chimpanzee observer place in Western Africa.

== Economy ==
Tourists that go to Bossou make the best of nature as Bossou has a rich nature and chimpanzees are also one of the main attractions. Bossou is known to be very rich in agriculture as its people grow coffee beans, rice, fruits and corn. Bossou is a very small city and therefore has a limited number of people, majority of people in Bossou are poor and there are only few government schools available and the level of education is relatively low.

== History ==
During the Liberian War, many refugees crossed the border to seek refuge and the government of Guinea built refugee camps on the high hills which still exists today. People in Bossou mainly speak Mano and one of the most popular people to come from Bossou is Jean-Marie Doré.

In 2024, local residents of Bossou demolished the chimpanzees research centre at the Reserve as one of the animals was reported to have captured and killed a human infant.

== Gallery ==
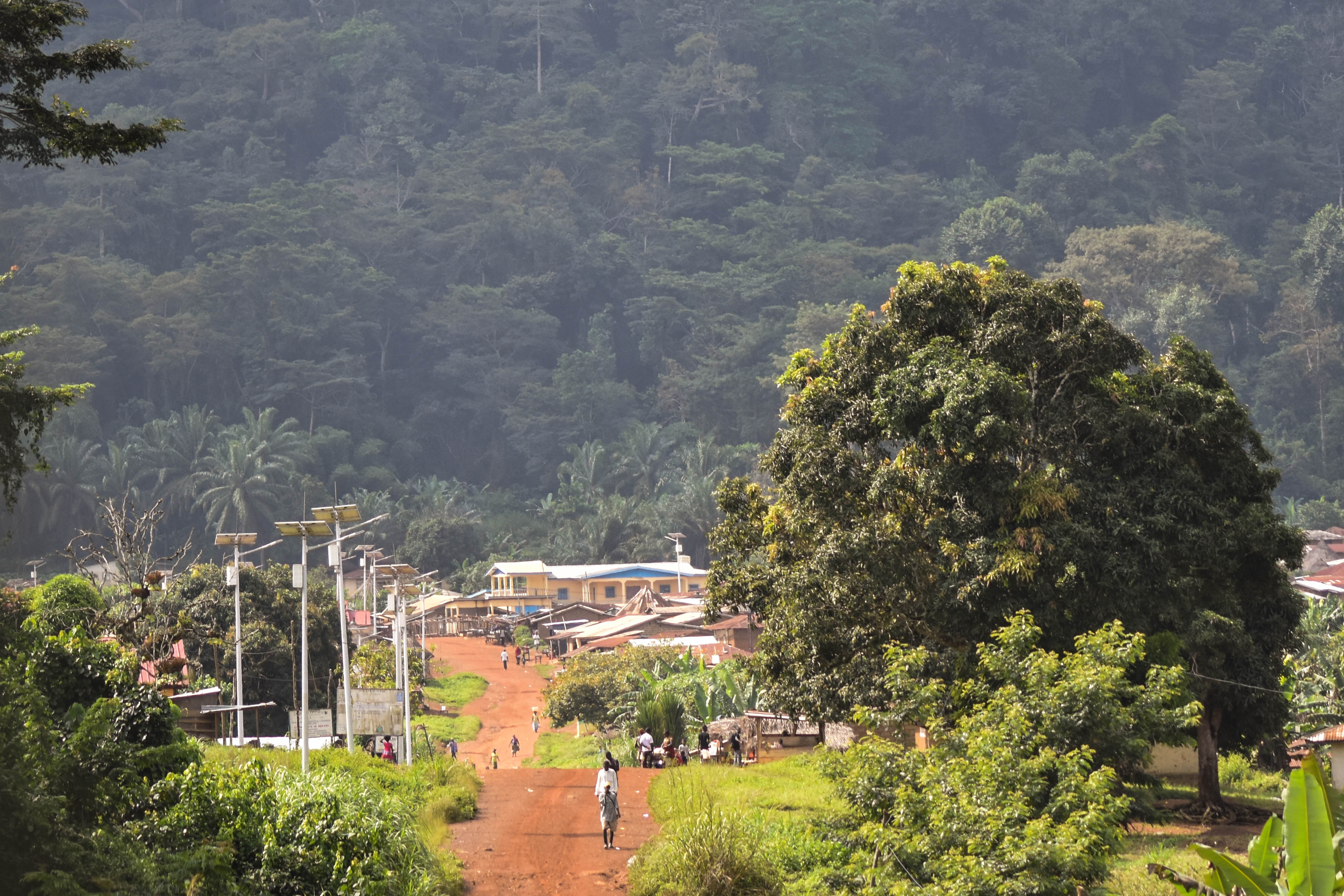
Bossou town

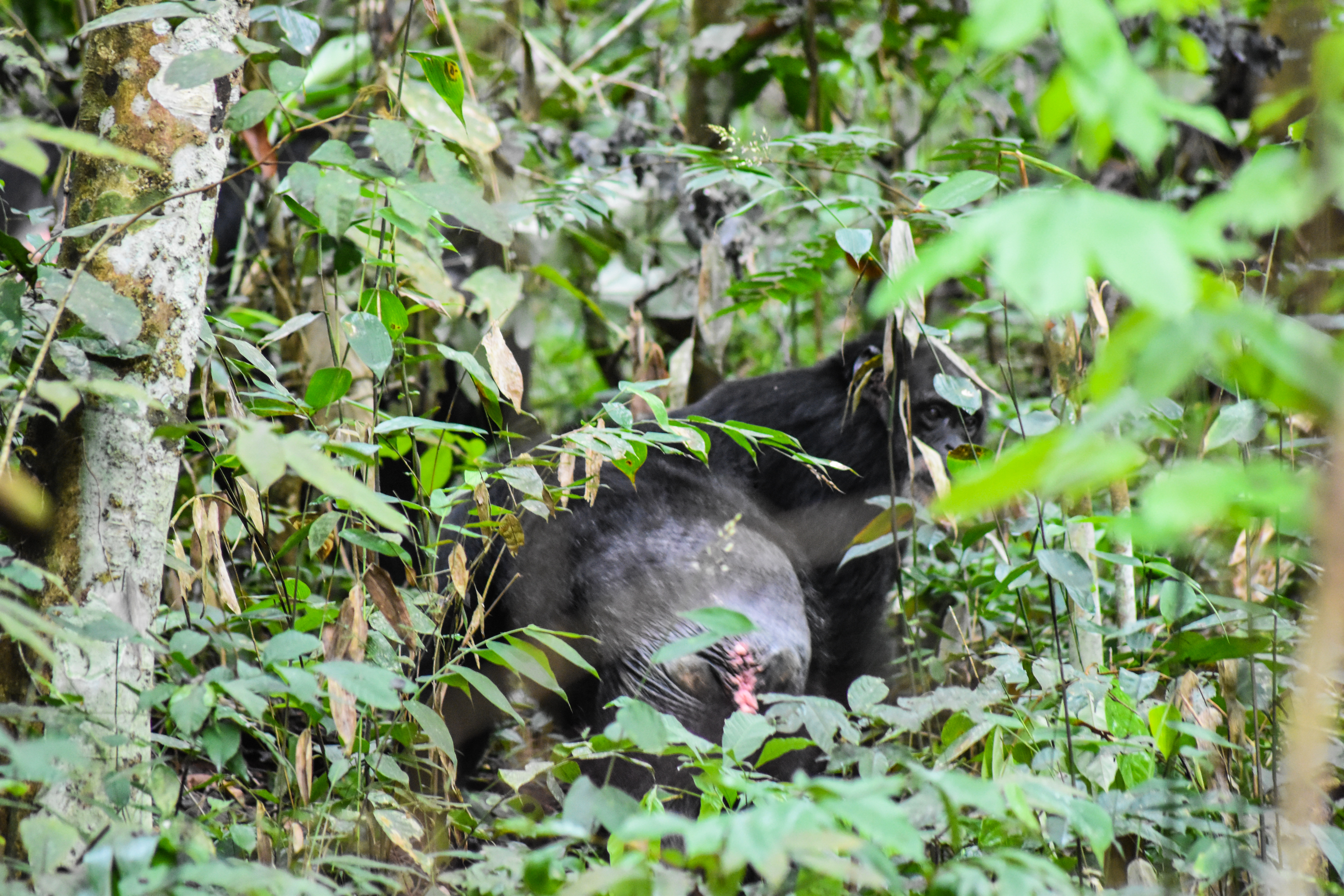
Western cimpanzees of Mount Nimba

== See also ==
- Forest Guinea
- Nimba Range
- Mount Nimba Strict Nature Reserve
- Wildlife of Guinea
