= Nimba Range =

Southern extent of the Guinea highlands

Coordinates: 7°34′N 8°28′W

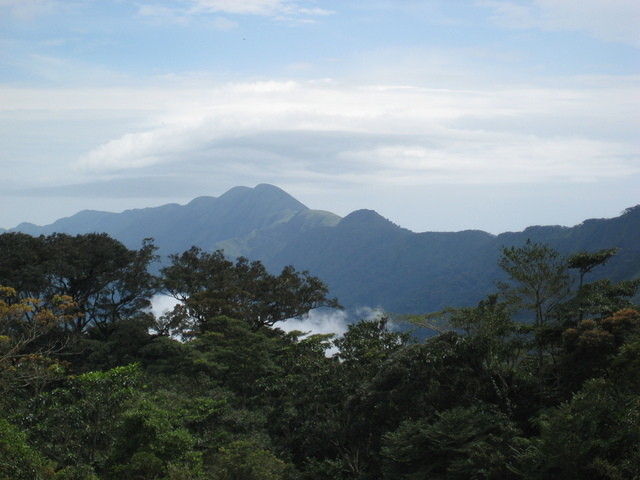
- Guinean montane forests near the Nimba range

Highest point
- Peak: Mount Nimba
- Elevation: 1,752 m (5,748 ft)

Dimensions
- Length: 40 km (25 mi)

Geography
- Location: Liberia, Guinea, Ivory Coast

The Nimba Range forms part of the southern extent of the Guinea Highlands, adjacent to the Toura Mountains. The highest peak is Mount Nimba on the border of Liberia, Ivory Coast and Guinea, at 1,752 m (5,748 ft), and at the intersection of the Nimba and Toura Mountains. "Mount Nimba" may refer either to Mount Richard-Molard or to the entire range. Other peaks include Grand Rochers at 1,694 m (5,558 ft), Mont Sempéré at 1,682 m (5,518 ft), Mont Piérré Richaud at 1,670 m (5,480 ft), Mont Tô at 1,675 m (5,495 ft), and Mont LeClerc 1,577 m (5,174 ft), all of them are located in Guinea. Mount Nimba Strict Nature Reserve of Guinea and Ivory Coast covers significant portions of the Nimba Range.

== Geology ==
The Nimba Range is a narrow ridge extending approximately 40 km long, with an orientation of northeast–southwest. It is composed mostly of Precambrian rock, including granite and quartzite which contain deposits of iron ore. Mining of top-quality iron-ore poses the major threat to the unique geomorphology and wildlife. There are about fifty springs, including the origins of the Cavally, Cestos, and Sassandra Rivers.

== Climate ==
Rainfall varies greatly with elevation and season. About 3,000 mm of rain falls at the highest altitudes, and between 700 and 1,200 mm at the lower elevations. In fact, some parts of the mountain receive less precipitation, due to rain-shadow effect of the high ridge. Most of the rainfall occurs between May and October.

== Ecology ==
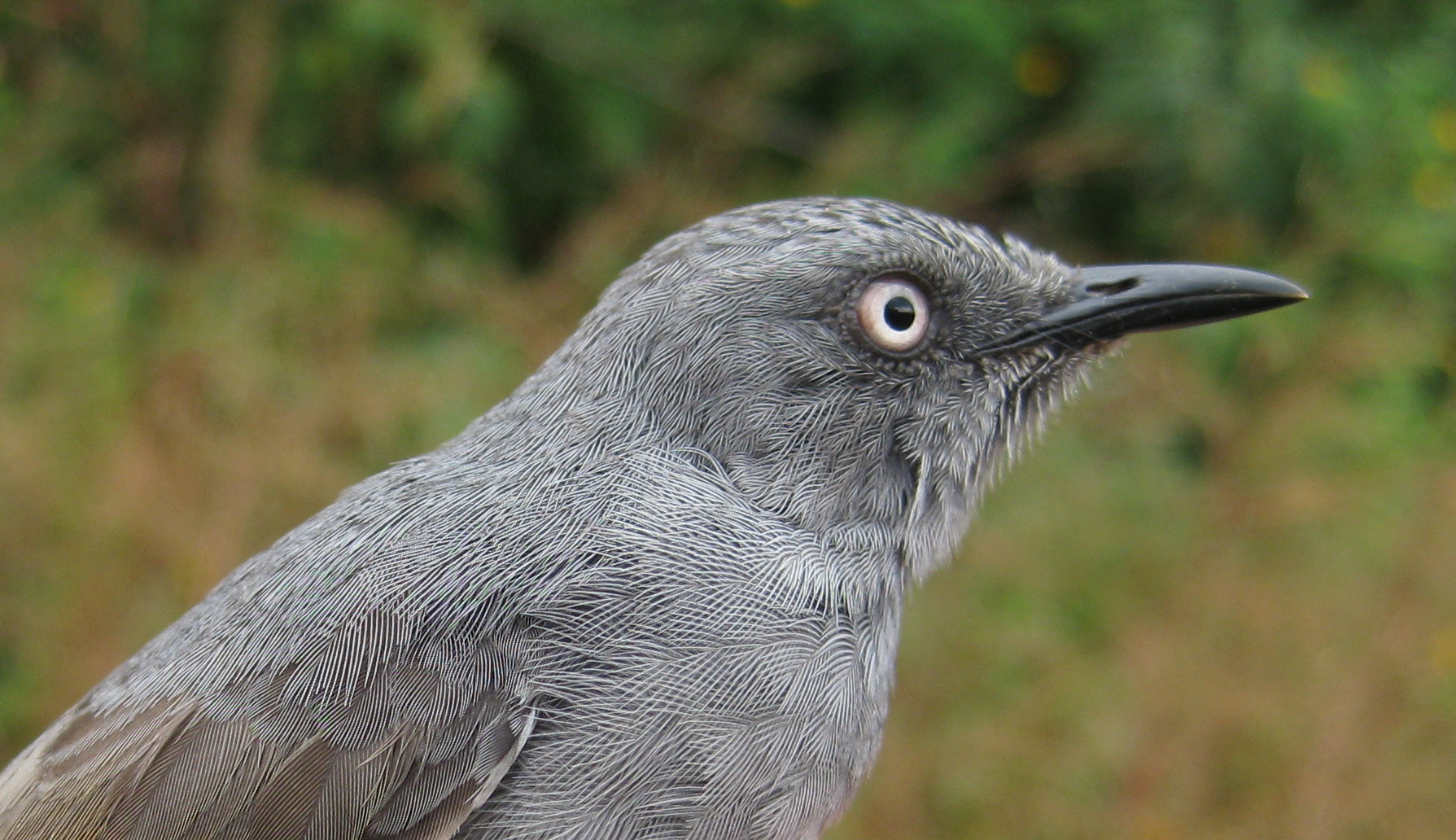
Sierra Leone prinia at Mount Nimba, Liberia

The Nimba Range harbours an especially rich flora and fauna, and it is the home of more than 2000 vascular plant species, 317 vertebrate species, 107 of which are mammals, and to more than 2,500 invertebrate species. Notably endemic vertebrates are Nimba viviparous toad, Lamotte's roundleaf bat, Myotis nimbaensis, and Nimba otter shrew. Other rare and endangered animals are West African lion, pygmy hippopotamus, zebra duiker, and western chimpanzee that uses stones as tools. The range has been designated an Important Bird Area (IBA) by BirdLife International because it supports significant populations of many bird species.

Terrestrial ecoregions include Western Guinean lowland forest, Guinean montane forest, Guinean forest-savanna mosaic, and West Sudanian savanna. The Nimba Range is a part of a distinct freshwater ecoregion with a high portion of endemic aquatic species.

=== Terrestrial ===
The plant communities vary with altitude and cardinal orientation.

The Guinean montane forests ecoregion covers the portion of the range above 600 meters elevation. Major plant communities in the ecoregion include montane grasslands and savannas, cloud forests, and lower montane forests. High-altitude grasslands and montane savannas cover the highest peaks, dominated by the grass Loudetia kagerensis. The grasslands are home to one endemic fern, Asplenium schnellii, and two endemic flowering plants, Osbeckia porteresii and Blaeria nimbana. Shrubs, including Protea occidentalis, inhabit the slopes. The endemic frog species Nimbaphrynoides occidentalis, which inhabits the montane grasslands of the range, is totally viviparous. The Guinea Screeching Frog (Arthroleptis crusculum) is a threatened species found on Mt. Nimba and other peaks in the Guinea Highlands. It is found in high-altitude grassland and in gallery forests during the dry season. Ptychadena submascareniensis is another frog species that has been found only on Mount Nimba and in the Loma Mountains of Sierra Leone. Below the highest peaks, montane grasslands interspersed by gallery forests, between 1,200 and 1,400 meters. Above 900 meters elevation, near-daily mist and clouds support cloud forests, dominated by the Guinea Plum tree (Parinari excelsa), trees of the Myrtle family (Myrtaceae), including Syzygium guineense, and species of Ochna and Gaertnera. The moist climate supports many epiphytes, including an endemic orchid, Rhipidoglossum paucifolium. Lower montane forests of Lophira procera, Tarrietia utilis, Mapania spp., Chlorophora regia, Morus mesozygia, and Terminalia ivorensis occur between 600 and 900 meters elevation.

Below 600 meters, the montane forests transition to the Western Guinean lowland forests ecoregion.

The mountain is surrounded by Guinean forest-savanna mosaic, and West Sudanian savanna.

=== Freshwater ===
Swift-running streams descend steep slopes of the range, and often experience torrential floods during the rainy season. Rheophytes, plants that can live in running water, dominate the aquatic vegetation.

The endemic aquatic animals in the Nimba Range includes frogs, fish, the Nimba Stream Crab (Liberonautes nimba), and the endangered Nimba otter shrew (Micropotamogale lamottei). The African clawless otter (Aonyx capensis) also inhabits the mountain streams. Species richness is high among aquatic invertebrates, including 81 species of dragonflies.

The WWF designates the Nimba Range a distinct freshwater ecoregion because of its moderate species richness and high proportion of endemic aquatic species, particularly among fish and amphibians. The Nimba Range's high elevation, its rapids and waterfalls that isolate habitat areas, and the stability of the aquatic environment, have promoted speciation.

The Guinean Highlands, of which the Nimba Range are part, separate the coastal rivers and streams of Upper Guinea from the upper Niger River basin. The highlands form a barrier to movement of aquatic species between these freshwater regions. The fish fauna of the Nimba Range shares affinities with that of Upper Guinea.

== Mount Nimba Strict Nature Reserve ==
In 1943, the colonial government established a Strict Nature Reserve in the Ivory Coast section of the range. It was extended into Guinea the following year. The area remained protected after Guinea and Ivory Coast became independent. UNESCO declared Mount Nimba a biosphere reserve in 1980, and a World Heritage Site shortly thereafter.
