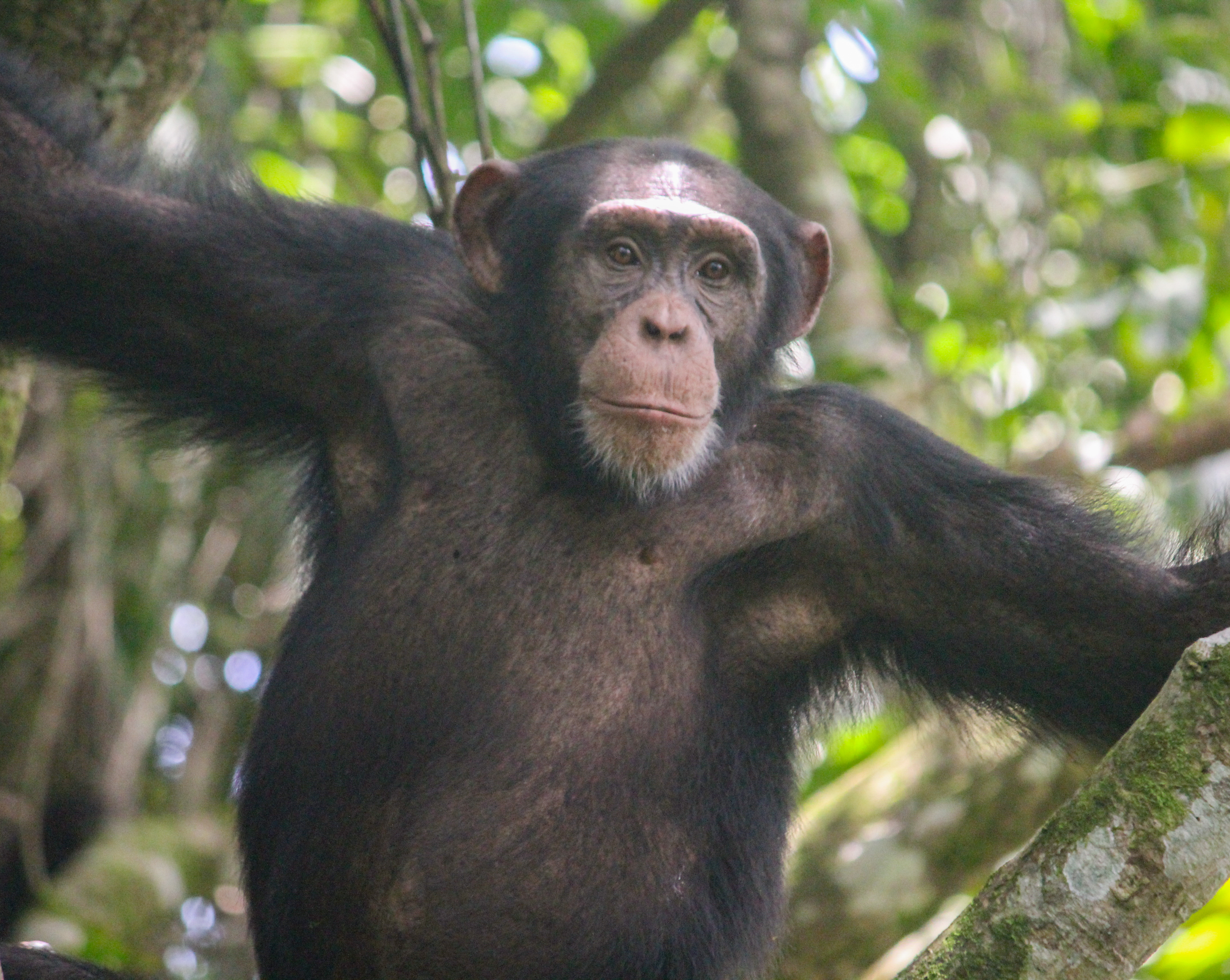

Conservation status
- Critically Endangered (IUCN 3.1)

Scientific classification
- Kingdom: Animalia
- Phylum: Chordata
- Class: Mammalia
- Order: Primates
- Superfamily: Hominoidea
- Family: Hominidae
- Genus: Pan
- Species: P. troglodytes
- Subspecies: P. t. verus

Trinomial name
- Pan troglodytes verus Schwarz, 1934
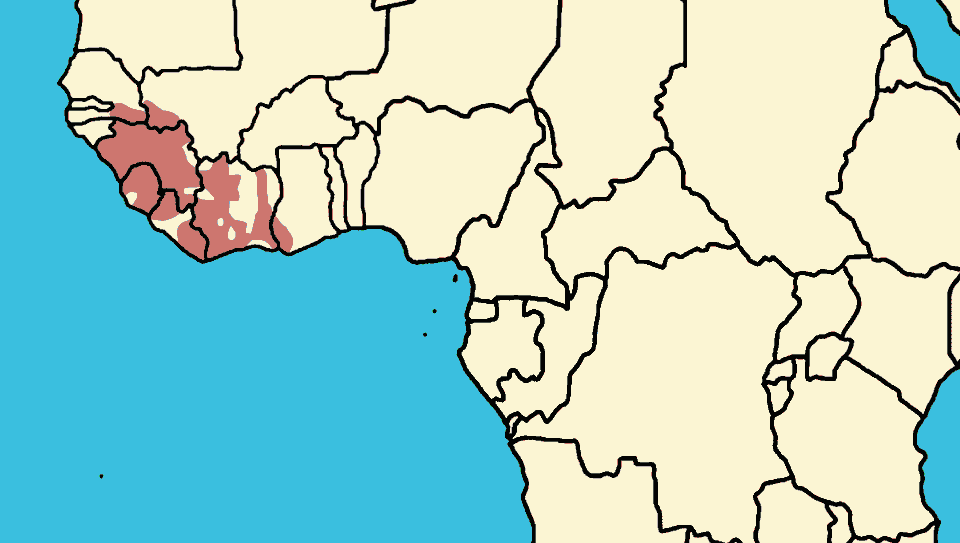

= Western chimpanzee =

Subspecies of ape

The western chimpanzee or West African chimpanzee (Pan troglodytes verus) is a critically endangered subspecies of the common chimpanzee. It inhabits western Africa, specifically Côte d'Ivoire, Guinea, Liberia, Mali, Senegal, Ghana, Sierra Leone, Guinea-Bissau, but has been extirpated in three countries: Benin, Burkina Faso, and Togo.

== Etymology ==
The taxonomical genus Pan is derived from the Greek god of fields, groves, and wooded glens, Pan. The species name troglodytes is Greek for 'cave-dweller', and was coined by Johann Friedrich Blumenbach in his Handbuch der Naturgeschichte (Handbook of Natural History) published in 1779. Verus is Latin for 'true', and was given to this subspecies in 1934 by Ernst Schwarz, who originally named it as Pan satyrus verus.

== Taxonomy and genetics ==
The western chimpanzee (P. t. verus) is a subspecies of the common chimpanzee (Pan troglodytes), along with the central chimpanzee (P. t. troglodytes), the Nigeria-Cameroon chimpanzee (P. t. ellioti), and the eastern chimpanzee (P. t. schweinfurthii). The western chimpanzee last shared a common ancestor with P. t. ellioti between 0.4 and 0.6 million years ago (mya) and with P. t. troglodytes and P. t. schweinfurthii 0.38–0.55 mya.

Western chimpanzees are the most genetically differentiated and homozygous subspecies of the common chimpanzee.

== Distribution and habitat ==
The population of the western chimpanzee once spanned from southern Senegal all the way east to the Niger River. Today, the largest populations remaining are found in Guinea, Sierra Leone, and Liberia.

== Behavior ==
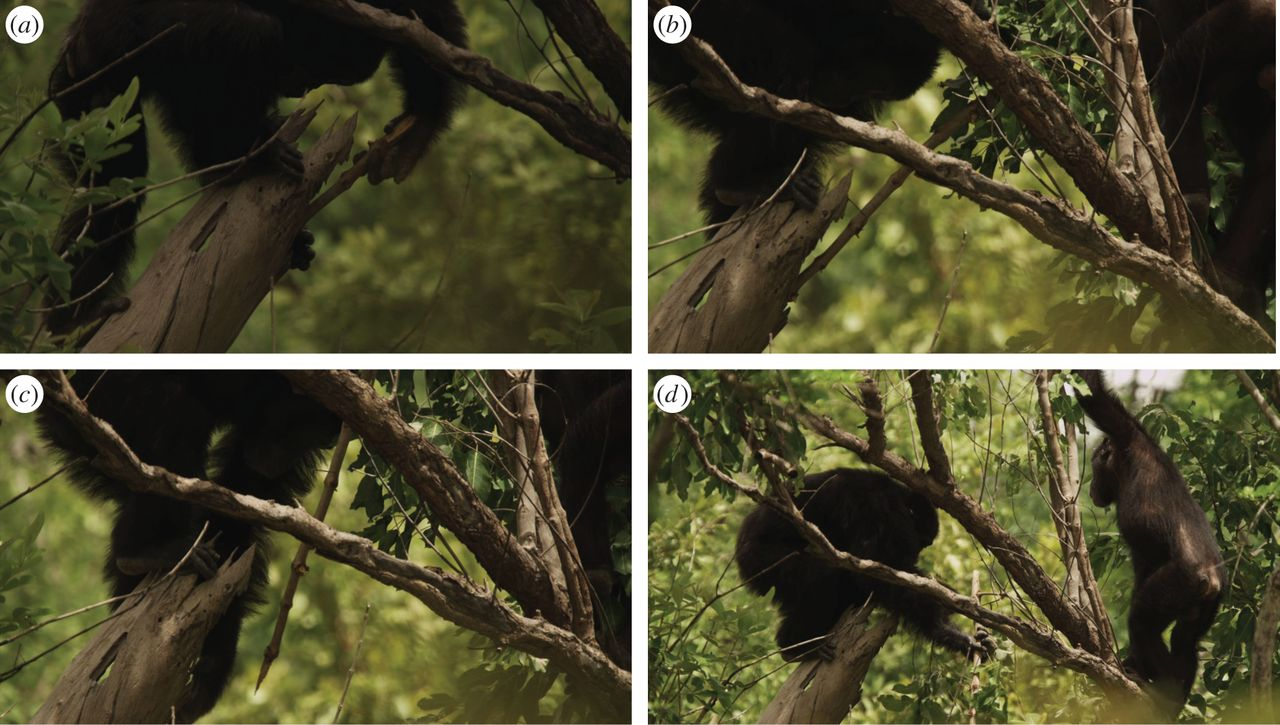
A western chimpanzee using a wooden spear to hunt a Senegal bush-baby inside the branch, as his adolescent brother observes.

=== Diet and hunting ===
Male and female western chimpanzees differ in their prey. In Fongoli, Senegal, Senegal bushbabies account for 75% of females' prey and 47% of the males'. While males will prey more on monkeys, such as green monkeys (27%) and Guinea baboons (18%), only males were observed to hunt patas monkeys and only females were observed to hunt banded mongooses. Both will occasionally hunt bushbucks, preferring fawns, when given the chance. Adult, adolescent, and juvenile females are slightly more likely to hunt with tools than males of the same age group. Chimpanzees near Kédougou, Senegal have been observed to create spears by breaking straight limbs off trees, stripping them of their bark and side branches, and sharpening one end with their teeth. They then used the weapons to hunt galagos sleeping in hollows.

A 2007 study of the western chimpanzee in Täi forest, Ivory Coast, revealed that local females, young males, young females and infants chimps hunt the Senegal bushbaby using fashioned spears. When a bushbaby roost was found, the chimps broke a branch from a nearby tree and sharpened the end using their teeth. They would then rapidly and repeatedly stab into the roost. After successly killing the bushbaby they reached into or smashed the roost, retrieved the body of the bushbaby and ate it. This method was observed to be successful only once in five attempts for a young female.

=== Unique behaviors ===
Western chimpanzees have unique behaviors never observed in any of the other subspecies of the chimpanzee. In fact, their behaviour is so diverged from that of their fellow subspecies of chimpanzee that it has been proposed West African chimpanzees may be a distinct species in their own right. They make wooden spears to hunt other primates, use caves as homes, share plant foods with each other, and travel and forage during the night. They also submerge themselves in water and play in it to stay cool in the oppressive heat.

Female west African chimpanzees are quite gregarious and often support one another in conflicts with males, resulting in a more gender-balanced hierarchy than that of the rigidly patriarchal east African chimpanzees. Female West African chimpanzees have been observed hunting and accompany males on territorial patrols, playing a more important role in social dynamics than other chimpanzee subspecies. While it was traditionally accepted that only female chimpanzees immigrate and males remain in their natal troop for life, western chimpanzees uniquely exhibit female and male immigration between groups, suggesting males are less territorial and more willing to accept unfamiliar males. Paternity tests indicate males frequently mate with females from several different communities, siring infants from them. There are even cases of solitary male western chimpanzees, while in any other population, a chimpanzee couldn't survive alone. Male West African chimpanzees generally are respectful of females and do not forcibly confiscate food from them, which may at least partly stem from the gregarious females forming alliances. Among the Tai forest community, infants are often adopted by unrelated adults, with both sexes adopting infants in equal measure. Female western chimpanzees also can rebuff the unwanted advances of males and select males to breed with on their own terms. This further is in line with the active and possibly co-dominant role female western chimpanzees play in their communities.

Chimpanzees in Tai National park crack open hard nuts with stones or branches. Some forethought in this activity is apparent, as these tools are not found together or where the nuts are collected. Nut cracking is also difficult and must be learned.

While western chimpanzees actively hunt various small mammals, they do not regard all potential prey species as food. At Bossou, Guinea, wild chimpanzees have been observed capturing western tree hyraxes (Dendrohyrax dorsalis) and toying with them rather than consuming them. In one observation, an adolescent female carried a hyrax for 15 hours, groomed it, and slept with it in her nest, while nearby adults ignored the animal. This behavior indicates that a lack of opportunity is not the sole reason these chimpanzees abstain from eating certain potential prey species.

In addition to tree hyraxes, chimpanzees at Bossou have been observed capturing West African wood-owls (Ciccaba woodfordi) without consuming them. In 2009, an adolescent male was documented on two occasions capturing owls and using them as "toys"—carrying the carcasses between nests, balancing them on his limbs while resting supinely, plucking their feathers, and grooming them—while nearby adults showed no interest in the birds. These observations further support the idea that Bossou chimpanzees occasionally capture potential prey opportunistically for play or exploration rather than for meat.

== Conservation status ==
The IUCN lists the western chimpanzee as Critically Endangered on the Red List of Threatened Species. There are an estimated 21,300 to 55,600 individuals in the wild. The primary threat to the western chimpanzee is habitat loss, although it is also killed for bushmeat.

== Human-wildlife conflict ==
As human development encroaches on natural habitats, interactions between western chimpanzees and humans have increasingly led to conflict. In September 2024, a tragic incident occurred in Bossou, Guinea, when a chimpanzee attacked a woman working in a cassava field and dragged her infant into the forest, resulting in the child's death. Following the attack, angry local residents ransacked a nearby chimpanzee research center. Such incidents highlight the growing tensions and conservation challenges associated with habitat overlap between humans and endangered chimpanzees.
