= Guinean forests of West Africa =

Biodiversity hotspots of West Africa

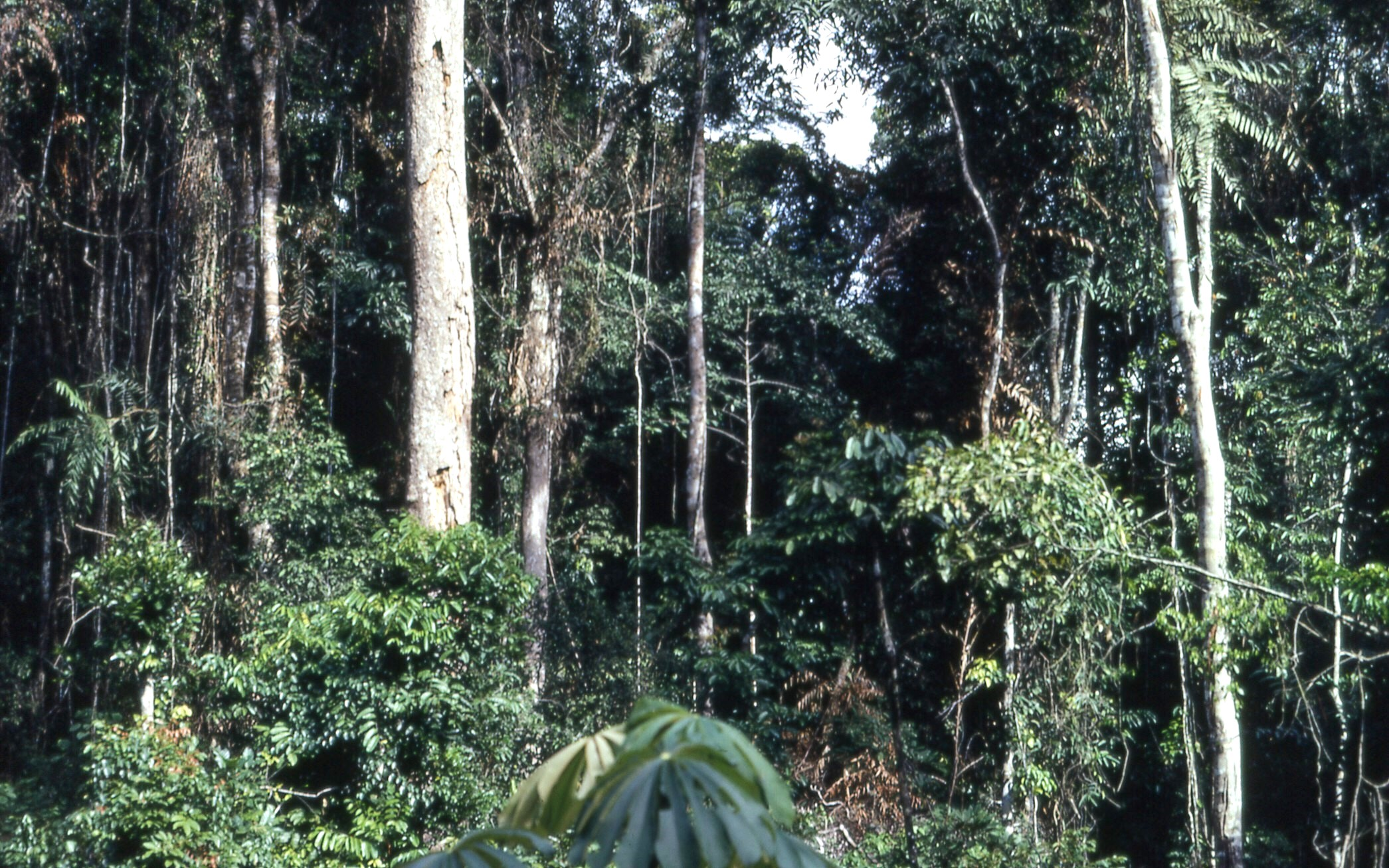
Tropical rainforest near Konimbo, Liberia, 1968

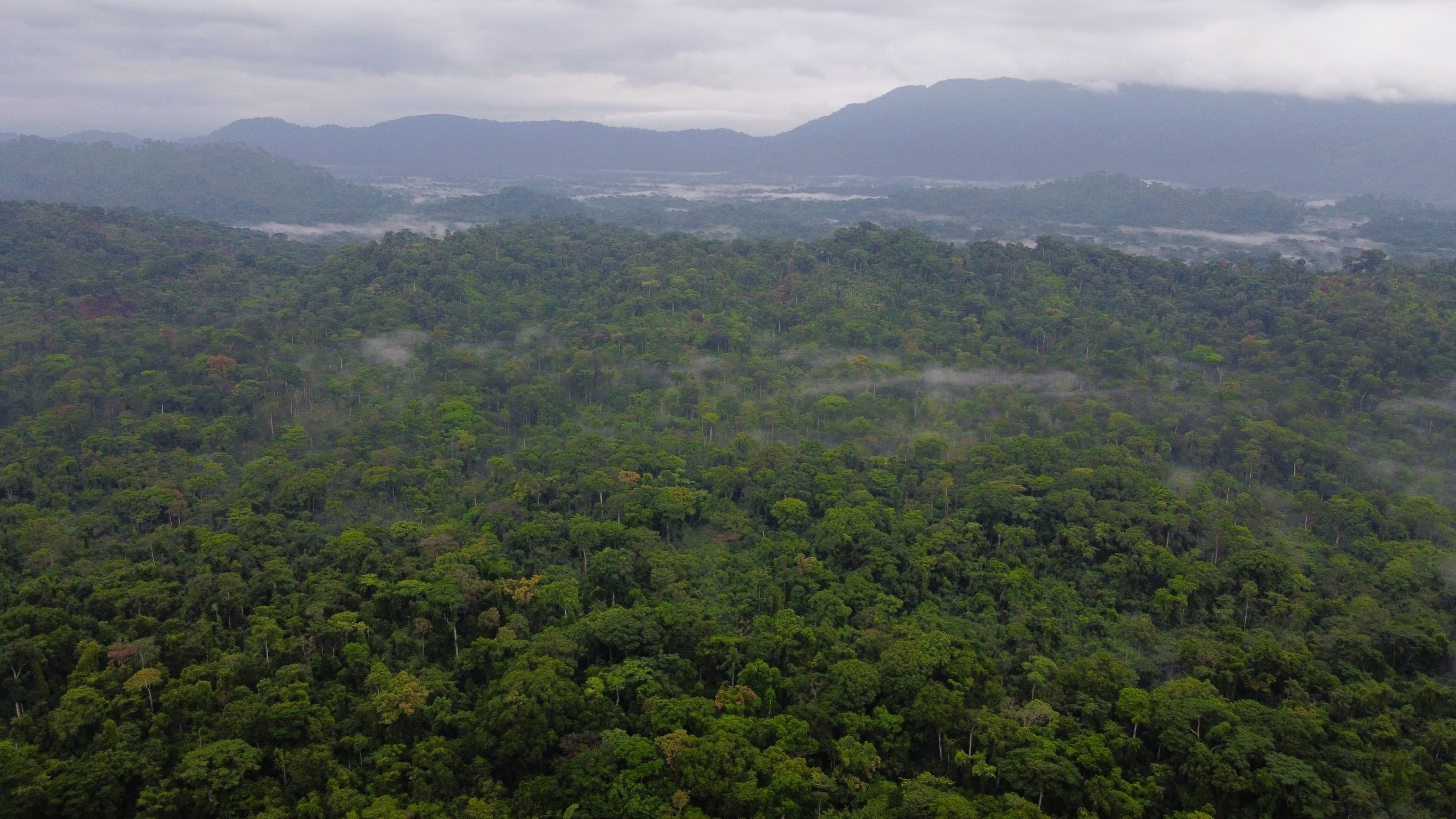
An Aerial view of the Afi River Forest Reserve in Cross River State, Nigeria

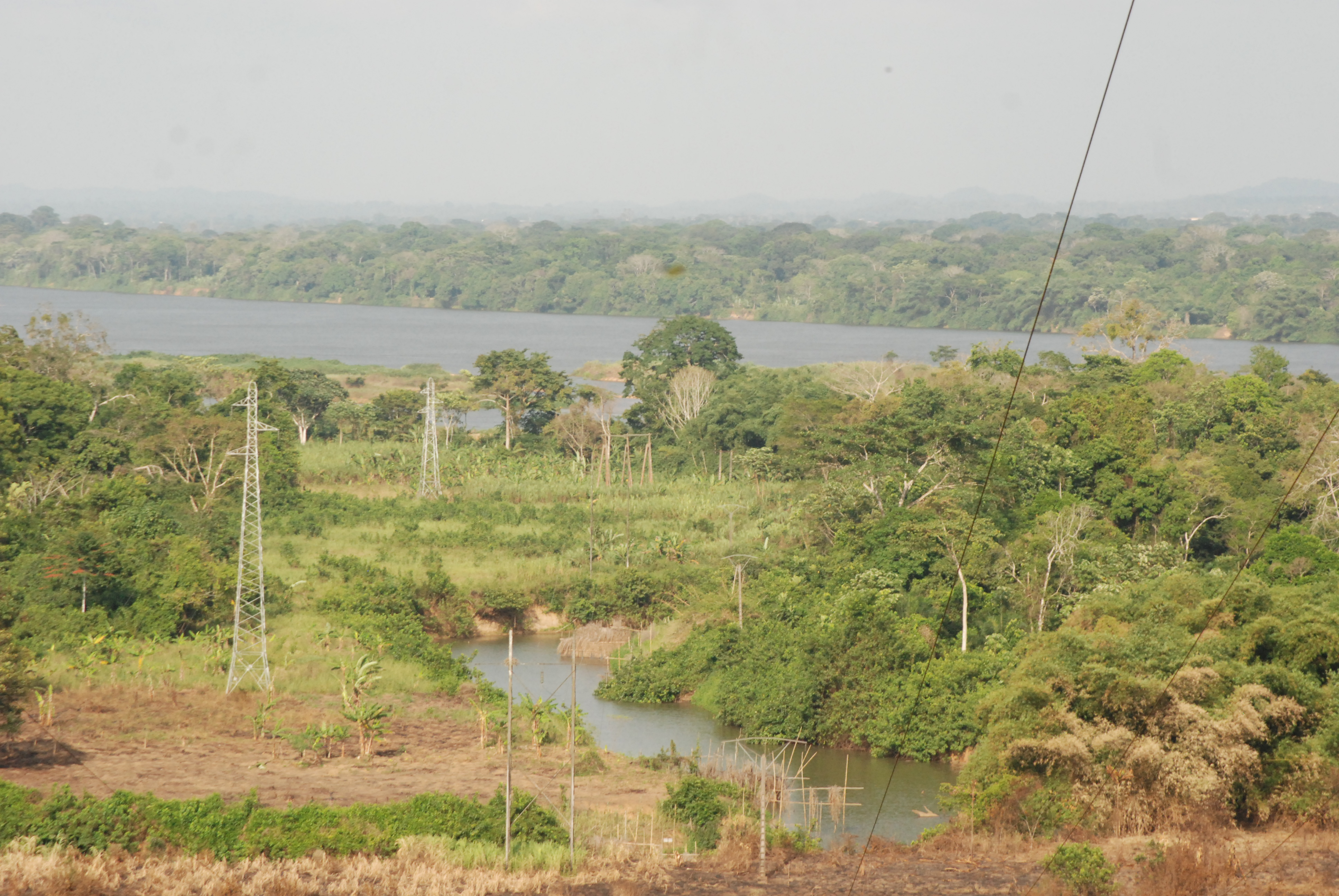
Forest along the Sanaga River at Edéa, Cameroon

The Guinean forests of West Africa are a biodiversity hotspot designated by Conservation International, which includes the belt of tropical moist broadleaf forests along the coast of West Africa, running from Sierra Leone and Guinea in the west to the Sanaga River of Cameroon in the east. The Dahomey Gap, a region of savanna and dry forest in Togo and Benin, divides the Guinean forests into the Upper Guinean forests and Lower Guinean forests.

The Upper Guinean forests extend from Sierra Leone and Guinea in the west through Liberia, Côte d'Ivoire, and Ghana to Togo in the east. The Lower Guinean forests extend east from Benin through Nigeria and Cameroon. The Lower Guinean forests also extend south past the Sanaga River, the southern boundary of the hotspot, into southern Cameroon, Equatorial Guinea, Gabon, Republic of the Congo, Cabinda, and Democratic Republic of the Congo.

According to some sources, deforestation has already wiped out roughly 90% of West Africa's original forests.

== Ecoregions ==
The World Wide Fund for Nature divides the Upper and Lower Guinean forests into a number of distinct ecoregions:

Upper Guinean forests

- Western Guinean lowland forests (Guinea, Sierra Leone, Liberia, Côte d'Ivoire)
- Guinean montane forests (Guinea, Sierra Leone, Côte d'Ivoire)
- Eastern Guinean forests (Côte d'Ivoire, Ghana, Togo, Benin)

Lower Guinean forests

- Nigerian lowland forests (Benin, Nigeria)
- Niger Delta swamp forests (Nigeria)
- Cross-Niger transition forests (Nigeria)
- Cross-Sanaga-Bioko coastal forests (Nigeria, Cameroon, Equatorial Guinea)
- Cameroonian Highlands forests (Nigeria, Cameroon)
- Mount Cameroon and Bioko montane forests (Cameroon, Equatorial Guinea)

== See also ==
- Guineo-Congolian region
