= Pico Basilé National Park =

National park in Equatorial Guinea

- IUCN category II (national park)
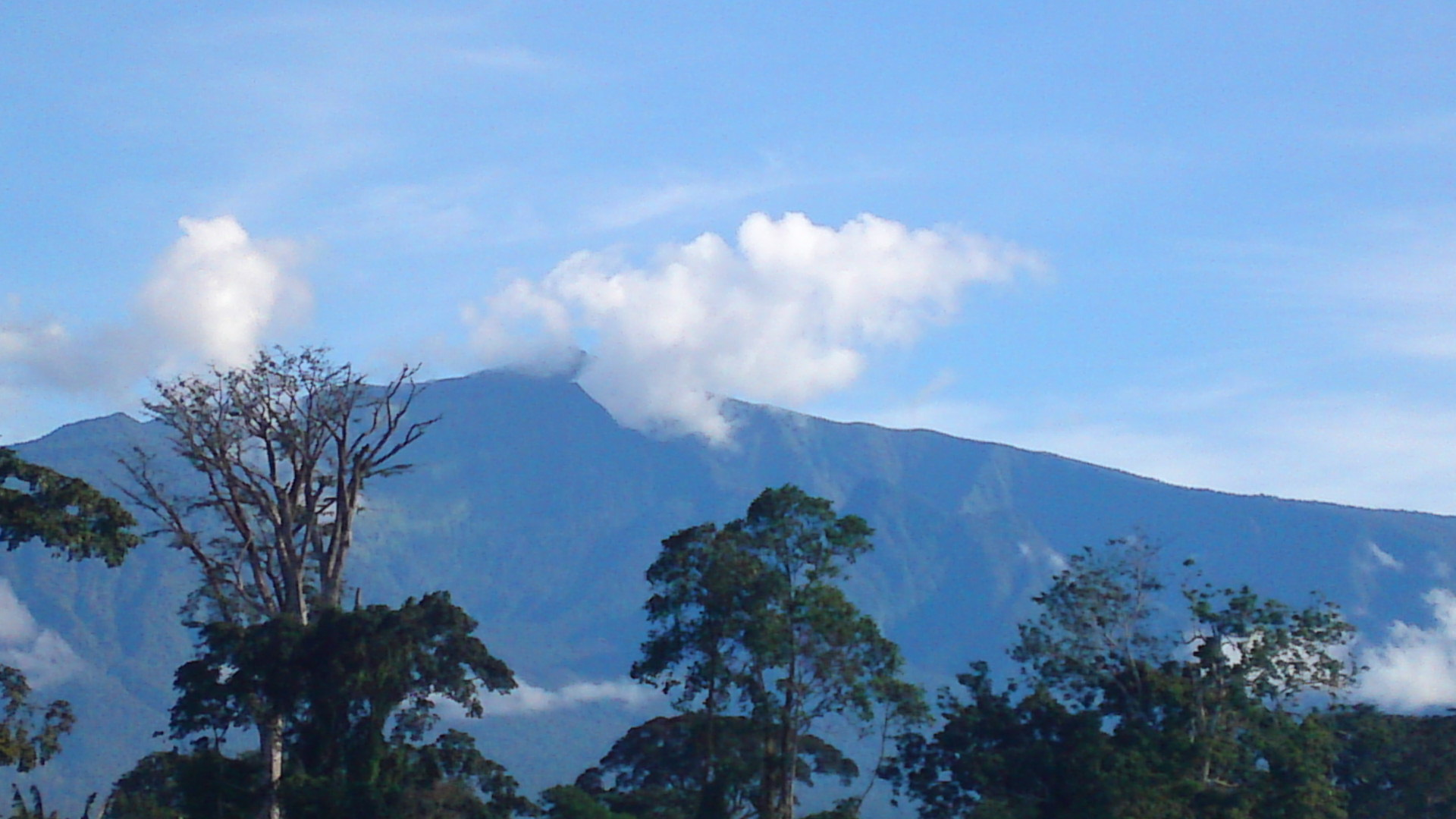
- Basilé Peak

- Location within Equatorial Guinea Location within Africa
- Location: Bioko, Equatorial Guinea
- Coordinates: 3°35′N 08°46′E
- Area: 30,000 hectares (120 sq mi)
- Established: 2000

The Pico Basilé National Park (Spanish: Parque nacional del Pico Basilé) is a protected area with the status of national park on the island of Bioko in Equatorial Guinea, near the Gulf of Guinea, in the Atlantic Ocean. The park is named after the Pico Basilé, the highest mountain in Equatorial Guinea, with 3011 m (9878 feet). Administratively it is included within the jurisdiction of the Equatorial Guinean province of Bioko Norte.

== History ==
In 2007 the government of Equatorial Guinea prohibited the hunting of diverse species, international organizations have shown concern for the noncompliance of the decree. The government is taking action to promote sustainable hunting in the park, which would encourage the development of the local rural community.

== Geography and environment ==
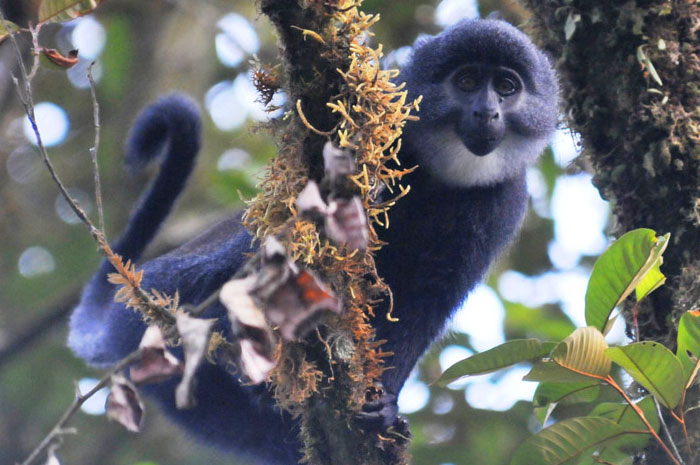
Preuss's monkey

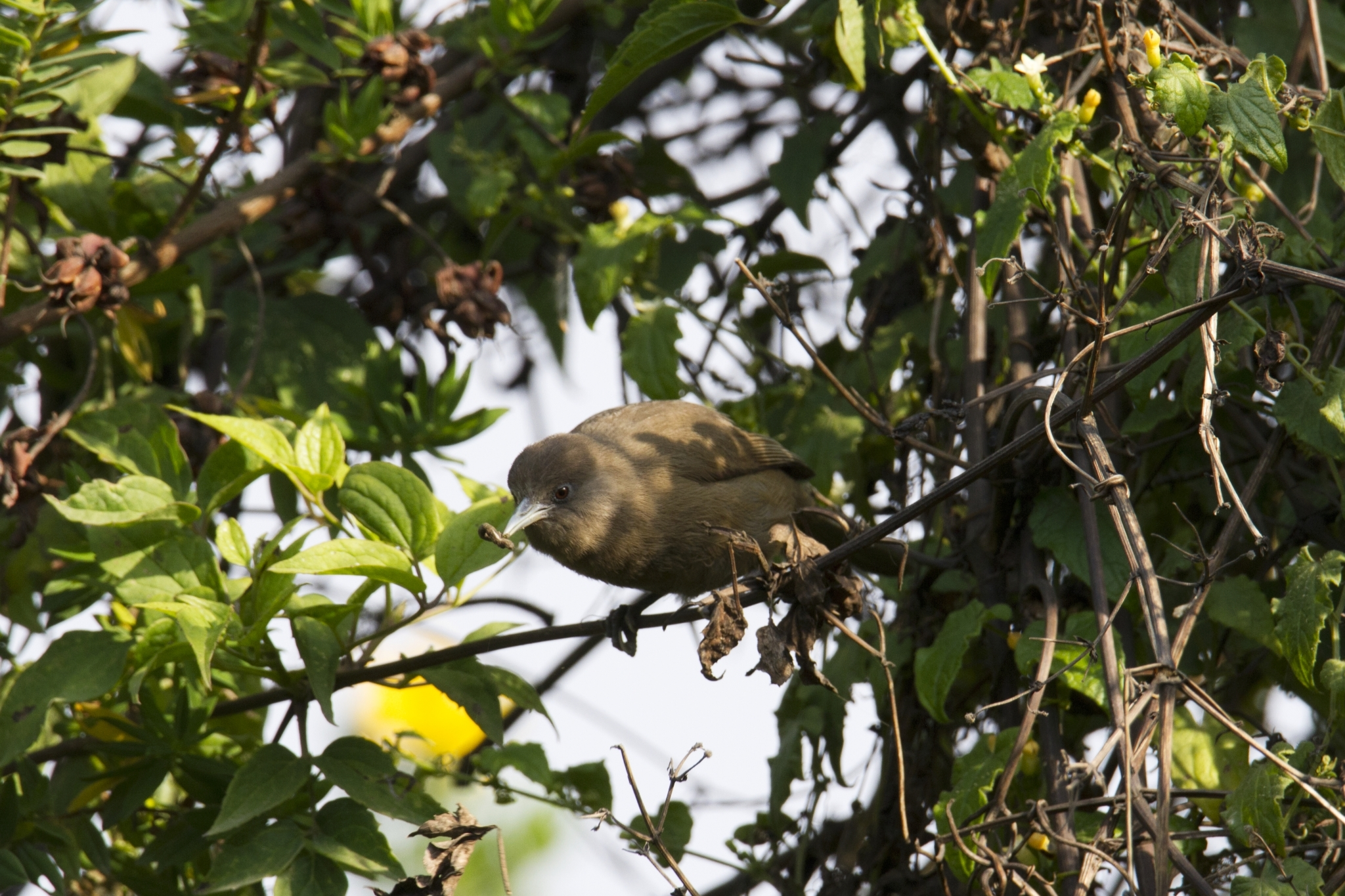
Bioko speirops

The park covers an area of 30,000 ha and was formally established in 2000. It is known for its diversity of landscapes and vegetation and especially for its primates, which are threatened by poaching. It contains populations of Preuss's monkey, red-eared guenon, black colobus, western red colobus, and drill—as well as of Ogilby's duiker.

The park has been designated an Important Bird Area (IBA) by BirdLife International because it supports significant populations of Cameroon olive-pigeons, green longtails, white-tailed warblers, mountain saw-wings, western mountain greenbuls, Cameroon olive greenbuls, black-capped woodland-warblers, Bioko speirops, Cameroon sunbirds, Ursula's sunbirds and Shelley's olivebacks.
