= Lower Guinean forests =

Tropical moist broadleaf forest region in West Africa

The Lower Guinean forests also known as the Lower Guinean-Congolian forests, are a region of coastal tropical moist broadleaf forest in West Africa, extending along the eastern coast of the Gulf of Guinea from eastern Benin through Nigeria and Cameroon.

The Dahomey Gap, a region of savanna and dry forest in Togo and Benin, divides the Lower Guinean forests from the Upper Guinean forests to the west, which extend along the western coast of the Gulf of Guinea from Togo to Liberia and north to Guinea. To the north and northeast, the Lower Guinean forests transition to the drier inland Guinean forest–savanna mosaic and Northern Congolian forest–savanna mosaic and to the southeast are bounded by the Congolian Coastal forests, whose boundary is the Sanaga River in Cameroon. The Lower Guinean forests share many biotic affinities with the Upper Guinean forests but are located in Sierra Leone. They are collectively known as the Guinean Forests of West Africa.

The Lower Guinean forests represent an ecological region in West and Central Africa. Stretching along the Gulf of Guinea in West Africa, these forests encompass parts of Nigeria, Cameroon, Equatorial Guinea. The Lower Guinean forests are globally recognized as a biodiversity hotspot, characterized by their ecological significance and species diversity.

== Ecoregions ==
The World Wide Fund for Nature (WWF) divides the Lower Guinean forests into a number of distinct ecoregions:

- Nigerian lowland forests (Benin, Nigeria)
- Niger Delta swamp forests (Nigeria)
- Cross–Niger transition forests (Nigeria)
- Cross–Sanaga–Bioko coastal forests (Nigeria, Cameroon, Equatorial Guinea)
- Cameroonian Highlands forests (Nigeria, Cameroon)
- Mount Cameroon and Bioko montane forests (Cameroon, Equatorial Guinea)
- São Tomé, Príncipe, and Annobón moist lowland forests (Equatorial Guinea, São Tomé and Príncipe)

The WWF has designated two regions of the Lower Guinean forests as Global 200 priority regions for conservation. The WWF's "Coastal Congolian forests" region includes the Cross-Sanaga Bioko coastal forests, São Tomé and Príncipe moist lowland forests, and Atlantic Equatorial coastal forests ecoregions. The "Cameroon Highlands forests" Global 200 region includes the Cameroonian Highlands forests and the Mount Cameroon and Bioko montane forests ecoregions.

== Geographical features ==
=== Tropical rainforests ===
These forests primarily consist of tropical rainforests, characterized by high rainfall, lush vegetation, and a wide variety of plant life. The region's rainfall is relatively evenly distributed throughout the year.

=== Flora and fauna ===
The Lower Guinean forests are recognized as one of the world's biodiversity hotspots. They are home to a vast array of plant and animal species, many of which are endemic.

Lower Guinean forests are known for their rich botanical diversity, including numerous tree species, epiphytes, orchids, and medicinal plants. The forests support diverse wildlife, including various primates (such as chimpanzees and gorillas), big cats (like leopards) and forest elephants, numerous bird species, reptiles, amphibians, and insects.

== Ecological significance ==
=== Carbon storage ===
These forests play a critical role in sequestering carbon dioxide, helping to mitigate climate change. Their extensive vegetation stores significant amounts of carbon. The Lower Guinean Forests help mitigating climate change by offering capacity for carbon storage. The extensive and diverse vegetation that thrives within this biome serves as a substantial carbon sink, effectively sequestering carbon dioxide from the atmosphere.

Numerous studies and scientific reports have emphasized the importance of these forests in the fight against climate change. Research findings underscore that the Lower Guinean Forests store significant amounts of carbon and serve as a buffer against the rising levels of atmospheric CO_{2}. This sequestration function underscores the invaluable role played by these forests in supporting global efforts to reduce the impacts of climate change.

=== Water regulation ===
The forests regulate water flow, helping to prevent flooding during heavy rains and ensuring a steady supply of freshwater to rivers and streams. The water regulation function of the Lower Guinean Forests is another crucial aspect of their ecological significance. These forests act as natural sponges, absorbing and releasing water in a manner that benefits both the environment and human communities. During periods of heavy rainfall, they play a critical role in preventing flooding by absorbing excess water and regulating its flow. This not only safeguards the ecosystems within the forests but also safeguards human settlements downstream from potential deluges. The forests ensure consistent freshwater supply to rivers and streams, sustaining local aquatic ecosystems and providing water resources for human communities. Aquatic life and vegetation depend on these water bodies.

=== Habitat for endangered species ===
Several critically endangered species, including the Cross River gorilla and various species of monkeys and birds, inhabit the Lower Guinean forests. The Lower Guinean Forests serve as a refuge for a diverse range of wildlife. Among the most emblematic inhabitants of these forests is also the Cross River gorilla, an elusive and highly endangered primate species. These forests are also home to multiple other species, including various monkeys, birds, and numerous plants with unique ecological significance. Forest preservation is necessary for the survival of these vulnerable species. Conservation efforts in the Lower Guinean Forests are crucial to maintaining the biodiversity of the region and ensuring the protection of these species.

=== Cultural and indigenous importance ===
These forests are often home to indigenous communities with rich cultural traditions. The forests provide resources and are central to the way of life of many local people. These forests supported diverse cultural traditions and lifestyles that have thrived for generations. The Cultural and Indigenous Importance of the Lower Guinean Forests extends beyond their ecological significance, reflecting a profound connection between the region's indigenous communities and the forest environment. Understanding and acknowledging this cultural dimension is integral to appreciating the holistic significance of these forests.

== Threats and conservation ==
=== Deforestation ===
The Lower Guinean forests are under threat from deforestation due to logging, agriculture, mining, and infrastructure development. This threatens both biodiversity and carbon storage. While not limited to this region, each cause contributes to the ongoing degradation of this ecosystem.

1. Commercial logging: Commercial logging is a major driver of deforestation in the Lower Guinean forests. Valuable timber species are harvested for export and domestic use, leading to a significant loss of forest cover. Examples include the extraction of mahogany (Swietenia spp.) and sapele (Entandrophragma cylindricum) for international markets. A study by the World Resources Institute (WRI) highlighted the impact of logging in this region, revealing that it accounts for a substantial portion of deforestation.
2. Agricultural expansion: The expansion of agriculture, including slash-and-burn farming, plays a substantial role in forest loss. Local communities clear forested areas to make way for crop cultivation, particularly in areas where subsistence farming is prevalent. Examples include cocoa cultivation, oil palm plantations, and subsistence farming practices. A report from the Rainforest Foundation UK documented the expansion of cocoa farming in the Lower Guinean forests and its detrimental impact on the environment.
3. Mining activities: Mining for valuable minerals such as gold and bauxite results in deforestation in the Lower Guinean forests. The extraction of these minerals leads to the clearing of large areas of forest and generates pollution, disrupting local ecosystems, e.g., during gold mining activities in Ghana and Guinea, widely reported as contributing to deforestation. The Global Forest Watch platform provides data on mining-related deforestation in these regions.
4. Infrastructure development: The construction of roads, highways, and other infrastructure projects often necessitates clearing significant portions of forested land. As human populations continue to grow, there is a growing demand for improved transportation networks, leading to further deforestation. The fragmentation of forest habitats due to infrastructure development isolates populations of various species and obstructs their migration.

=== Habitat fragmentation ===
Habitat fragmentation is a pressing concern in the Lower Guinean forests, threatening the integrity of this ecosystem. The expansion of human activities, including infrastructure development and agricultural expansion, has led to the fragmentation of forest habitats, making it increasingly challenging for wildlife to thrive, disperse, and maintain genetic diversity. This phenomenon is especially relevant to the Lower Guinean forests and has far-reaching ecological consequences which include limiting the ability of wildlife to access necessary resources, find suitable mates, and maintain genetic diversity. Smaller, isolated populations of species face an increased risk of inbreeding and reduced adaptive capacity. Additionally, fragmented habitats are more vulnerable to edge effects, such as increased predation, invasive species, and altered microclimates. These consequences of habitat fragmentation pose significant challenges to the conservation and long-term sustainability of the Lower Guinean forests.

=== Illegal wildlife trade ===
Illegal wildlife trade and poaching pose substantial threats to the region's fauna and flora, encompassing illegal capture, sale, and transportation of wildlife primarily for bushmeat and exotic pet markets. The trade encompasses the illegal capture, sale, and transportation of wildlife, and it primarily targets species for bushmeat and the exotic pet trade.

1. Bushmeat trade: The illegal trade in bushmeat, which involves the hunting and consumption of wild animals for food, is a significant concern in the Lower Guinean forests. It poses a severe threat to numerous species, including primates, duikers, and pangolins. Unsustainable hunting practices, driven by a growing demand for bushmeat, have led to declines in wildlife populations. Local communities often rely on bushmeat as a source of protein, but the commercial bushmeat trade, which caters to urban and international markets, exacerbates the problem. This trade results in overhunting and population decline of various species. Unfortunately, many of these activities remain clandestine and are difficult to monitor and control.
2. Exotic pet trade: The illegal trade in exotic pets is another concerning facet of wildlife trafficking in the Lower Guinean forests. It targets a wide range of species, including parrots, reptiles, and small mammals, for the global pet trade. These animals are often captured in the wild, often causing harm to their populations. The process of capturing, transporting, and selling these creatures not only threatens their survival but also introduces invasive species to new regions. The international demand for exotic pets contributes to the persistence of this trade.
3. Traditional medicine and folklore: The use of wildlife in traditional medicine and cultural practices is a lesser-known but significant driver of illegal wildlife trade in the region. Various animal parts, such as bones, skins, and organs, are sought for their perceived medicinal or spiritual properties. These practices put additional pressure on wildlife populations and further fuel the illegal trade.

=== Climate change ===
The Lower Guinean forests, like many other critical ecosystems around the world, are increasingly susceptible to the effects of climate change. These forests, known for their high levels of biodiversity and carbon storage, face climate-related challenges that threaten their ecological balance and alter their functions. Changing rainfall patterns and temperature variations associated with climate change can impact the health and distribution of forest ecosystems.

1. Changing rainfall patterns: Climate change has led to alterations in rainfall patterns across the Lower Guinean forests. This region typically experiences a tropical climate with distinct wet and dry seasons. However, global warming is contributing to shifts in precipitation patterns, with implications for both flora and fauna. Prolonged dry seasons and more intense rainfall events disrupt the timing of flowering and fruiting of many plant species, affecting the availability of food resources for wildlife. Changes in rainfall patterns and their impact on local ecosystems emphasize the urgent need for adaptive strategies and conservation efforts.
2. Temperature variations: Rising temperatures are a growing concern in the Lower Guinean forests. Increased temperatures induce heat stress in many plant and animal species, particularly those adapted to the relatively stable climate of these forests. Some species find it challenging to adjust to warmer conditions, and the thermal stress impacts local species composition. Research suggests that rising temperatures in the region promote wildlife and human diseases.
3. Drought and forest health: Drought events are becoming more frequent and severe due to climate change, weakening the resilience of the Lower Guinean forests. Prolonged droughts reduce soil moisture, impacting tree health and potentially leading to increased tree mortality. Such changes disrupt forest dynamics and the structure of these ecosystems. Additionally, drier conditions make forests more susceptible to wildfires.
4. Carbon storage and climate mitigation: The Lower Guinean forests play a crucial role in global carbon storage and sequestration. The carbon stored in these forests helps mitigate climate change by reducing the concentration of greenhouse gases in the atmosphere. However, droughts and heat stress can compromise the forest's ability to serve as carbon sinks. Maintaining the health and resilience of these forests is essential for mitigating climate change at both local and global scales.

== Conservation efforts ==
Efforts are being made by conservation organizations, governments, and local communities to protect and conserve the Lower Guinean forests. Strategies include creating protected areas, promoting sustainable forestry practices, and raising awareness about the ecological and cultural value of these unique forests. Conservation initiatives aim to balance the need for economic development with ecological preservation.

One strategy in the conservation of the Lower Guinean forests involves the establishment of protected areas which act as wildlife sanctuaries. Notable examples include the Cross River National Park in Nigeria and Taï National Park in Côte d'Ivoire. These protected areas serve as refuges for endangered species like the Cross River gorilla and the pygmy hippopotamus, provide opportunities for scientific research and ecotourism, generate economic benefits for local communities, and safeguard the natural heritage of the region.

Recognizing the importance of logging and forestry for the region's economic development, conservation efforts focus on promoting sustainable forestry practices. Selective logging, reduced-impact logging, and other sustainable techniques are encouraged in order to minimize the ecological footprint of the timber industry. Local communities are involved in these initiatives, ensuring that their livelihoods are not compromised while protecting the forests. Forest certification programs like the Forest Stewardship Council (FSC) help ensure that forestry operations adhere to environmentally responsible practices.

Conservation organizations, governmental agencies, and local communities are actively involved in raising awareness about the ecological and cultural significance of these forests. Educational campaigns, documentaries, and community engagement programs help convey the importance of these ecosystems and the need for their preservation. Through these efforts, the global community is made aware of the forests' biodiversity, their role in mitigating climate change, and the cultural traditions of the communities living in and around these areas.

One of the most pressing challenges in conserving the Lower Guinean forests is the need to strike a balance between economic development and environmental conservation. The forests provide resources like timber, non-timber forest products, and agricultural land for local communities. However, unregulated exploitation risk deforestation and habitat loss. Conservation initiatives work in concert with local governments and businesses to develop sustainable land-use practices. By providing alternative livelihoods and supporting eco-friendly industries, such as ecotourism, conservationists aim to ensure that economic development does not come at the expense of the forests' integrity.

== See also ==
- Congolian rainforests
