= Mount Cameroon and Bioko montane forests =

Ecoregion in Africa

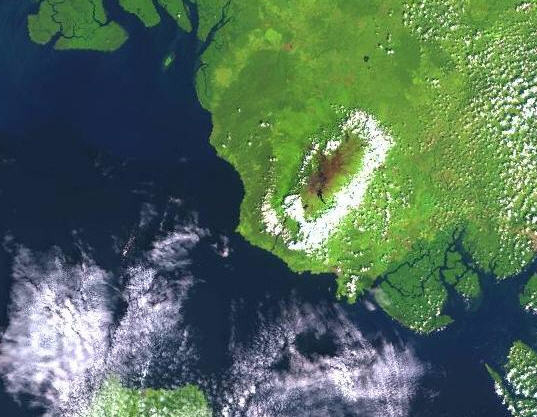
- Satellite imagery of the Mount Cameroon and Bioko montane forests. Mount Cameroon is the peak in the center of the picture; Bioko is visible in the lower left.

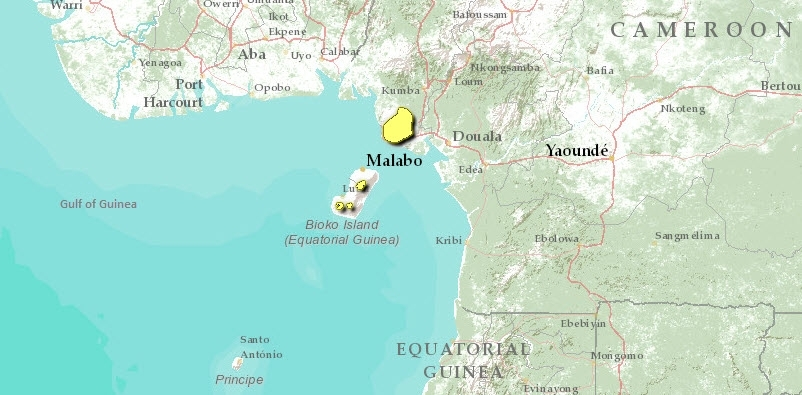
- Location map of the Mount Cameroon and Bioko montane forests

Ecology
- Realm: Afrotropical
- Biome: tropical and subtropical moist broadleaf forests
- Borders: Cross-Sanaga-Bioko coastal forests

Geography
- Area: 1,141 km^{2} (441 mi^{2})
- Countries: Cameroon; Equatorial Guinea

Conservation
- Conservation status: Critical/endangered
- Global 200: yes
- Protected: 736 km² (64%)

The Mount Cameroon and Bioko montane forests is a tropical moist broadleaf forest ecoregion in central Africa. It occupies the upper slopes of coastal Mount Cameroon in Cameroon, and the mountains of nearby Bioko island in Equatorial Guinea.

== Geography ==
The ecoregion includes the distinct montane forests on the higher elevations of two volcanic peaks, Mount Cameroon, which lies in Cameroon near the coast, and Bioko, a volcanic island to the southwest in Equatorial Guinea.

The montane forests occur as low as 500 meters elevation on Mount Cameroon. They also occur above 1500 meters elevation on three peaks on Bioko, Pico Basilé (3,011 meters elevation), Gran Caldera de Luba (2,261 m), and Pico Biao (2,009 m). The montane forests are surrounded at lower elevations by the Cross-Sanaga-Bioko coastal forests ecoregion.

Both Bioko and Mount Cameroon are part of the Cameroon Volcanic Line, a line of volcanoes that runs northeast-southwest across the Cameroon Highlands and extending into the Atlantic Ocean as the islands of Bioko, São Tomé, Príncipe, and Annobón. At over 4,000 m Mount Cameroon is the highest peak in western Africa, and is still an active volcano.

== Climate ==
The southwestern slopes of these mountains have a wet climate all year round.

== Flora ==
The montane forests of Mount Cameroon and Bioko are home to the distinct Afromontane flora of Africa's high mountains. The chief plant communities are montane forests, montane grasslands, and heathlands. At least 42 plant species are strictly endemic and another 50 near-endemic to Mount Cameroon.

== Fauna ==
370 species of birds have been recorded on Mount Cameroon, including some endemics. Endemic birds include the mountain saw-wing (Psalidoprocne fuliginosa), Mount Cameroon francolin (Pternistis camerunensis), Mount Cameroon speirops (Zosterops melanocephalus), and Bioko speirops (Zosterops brunneus). There is less variety of mammals, and most larger mammals have disappeared, but there are some endemics such as the Cameroon soft-furred mouse (Praomys morio), and a greater variety of reptiles and amphibians including the endemic toad Werneria preussi.

== Conservation and threats ==
The forest of Mount Cameroon is threatened, especially at lower elevations, by conversion to agriculture and logging.

== Protected areas ==
A 2017 assessment found that 736 km², or 64%, of the ecoregion is in protected areas. Only 5% of the unprotected area is still forested. Protected areas include Mount Cameroon National Park on Mount Cameroon, and Pico Basilé National Park and Luba Crater Scientific Reserve on Bioko.

== See also ==
- Lower Guinean forests
