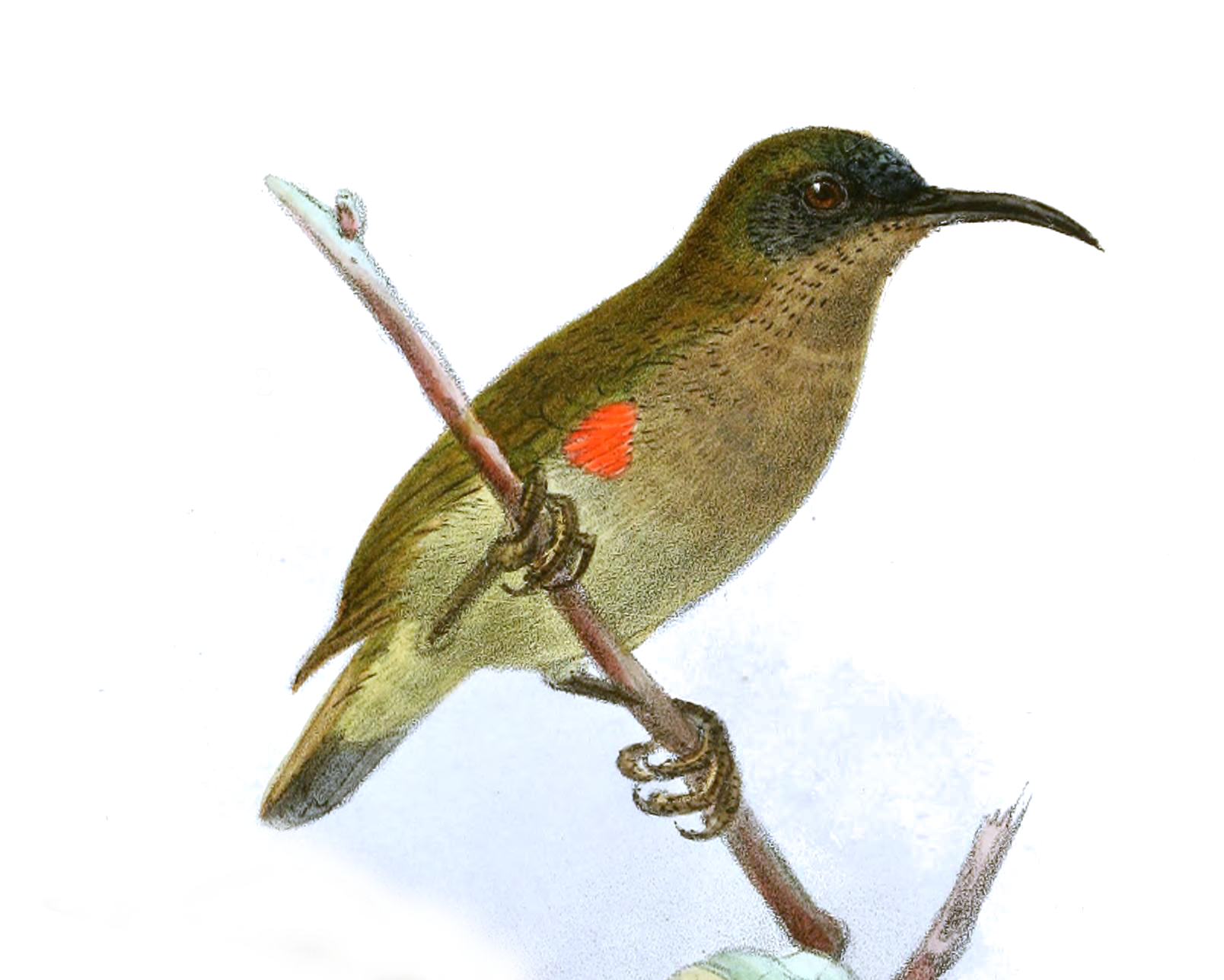

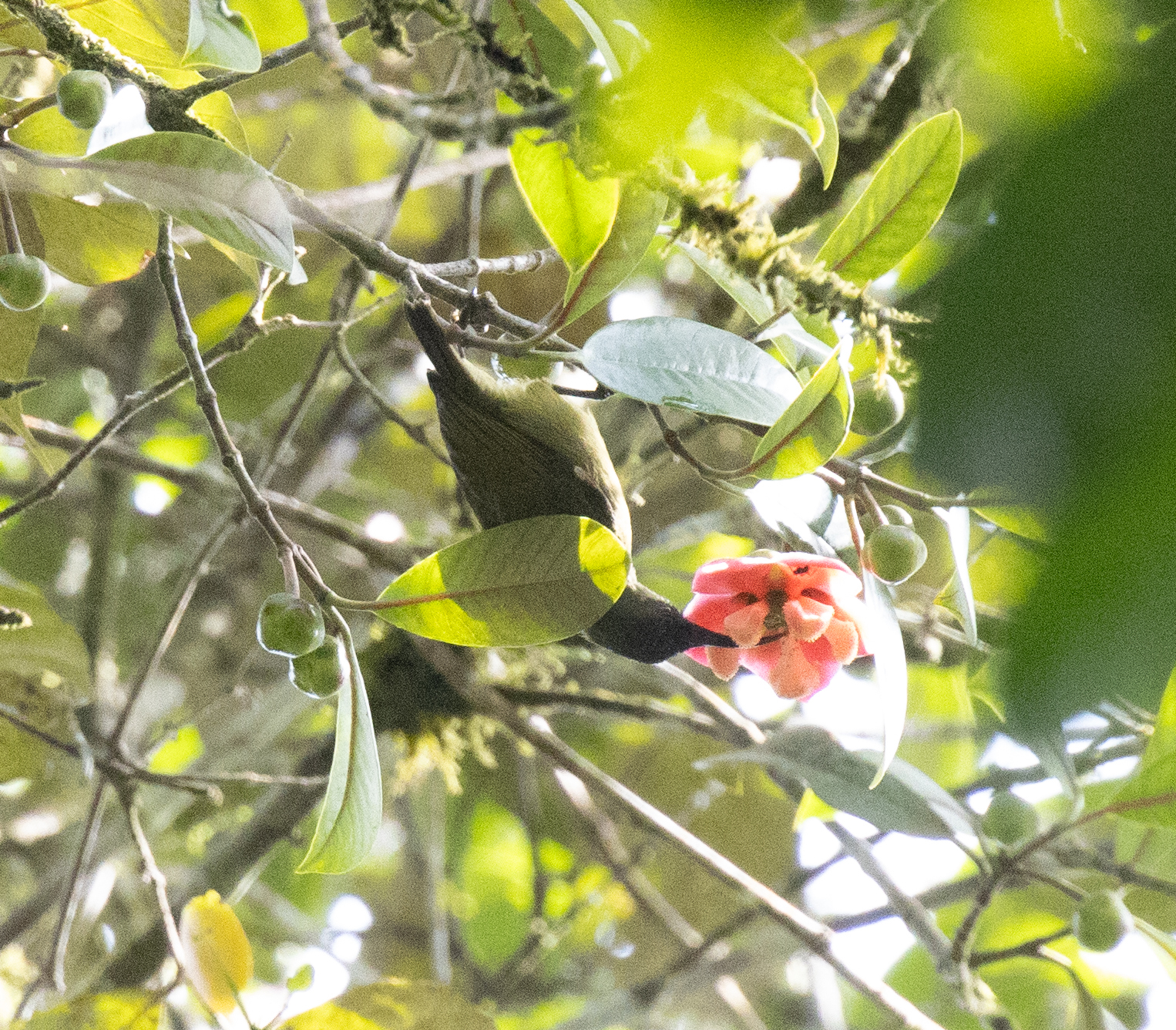

Conservation status
- Least Concern (IUCN 3.1)

Scientific classification
- Kingdom: Animalia
- Phylum: Chordata
- Class: Aves
- Order: Passeriformes
- Family: Nectariniidae
- Genus: Cinnyris
- Species: C. ursulae

Binomial name
- Cinnyris ursulae (Alexander, 1903)

Synonyms
- Nectarinia ursulae

= Ursula's sunbird =

Species of bird

Ursula's sunbird (Cinnyris ursulae) is a species of bird in the family Nectariniidae restricted to the continental and near-shore portions of the Cameroon line.

== Taxonomy ==
Monotypic. Formerly considered a member of the genus Nectarinia along with other Cinnyris sunbirds.

== Habitat and Distribution ==
Its natural habitat is subtropical or tropical moist montane forests. Its distribution is almost wholly restricted to the Cameroonian Highlands forests and Mount Cameroon and Bioko montane forests ecoregions, occurring in Nigeria, Cameroon, and Equatorial Guinea (specifically, on Bioko). It is threatened by habitat loss.
