= Sipopo =

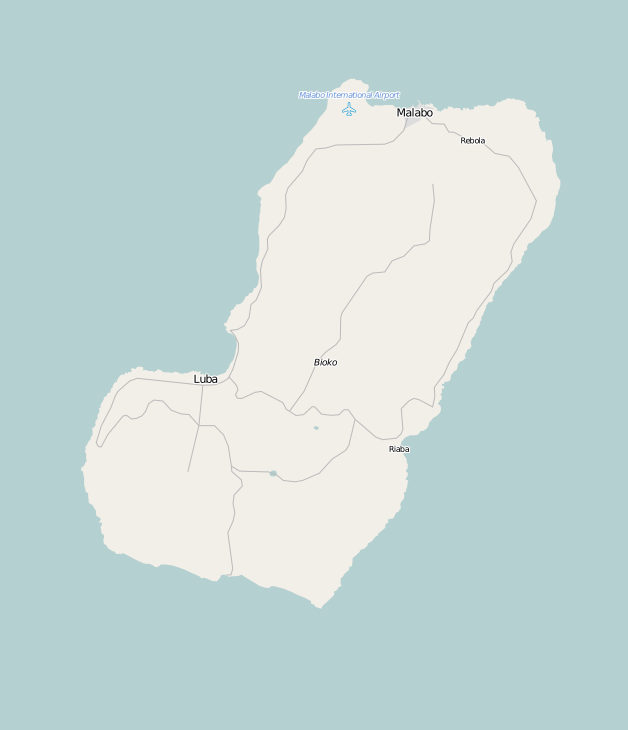
- Location in Bioko Sipopo (Equatorial Guinea)
- Coordinates: 3.7489°N 8.8914°E
- Country: Equatorial Guinea
- Province: Bioko Norte
- District: Baney
- Climate: Am

Sipopo is a resort town located in the province of Bioko Norte of Equatorial Guinea.

== History ==
Sipopo was inaugurated on 5 June 2011.

== Geography ==
Sipopo is situated in the northeastern part of the island of Bioko. It contains a 200-room hotel run by the Sofitel hotel chain, Sofitel Malabo Sipopo Le Golf.
