= Guinean forest–savanna mosaic =

Tropical forest, savanna, and grassland ecoregion in West Africa

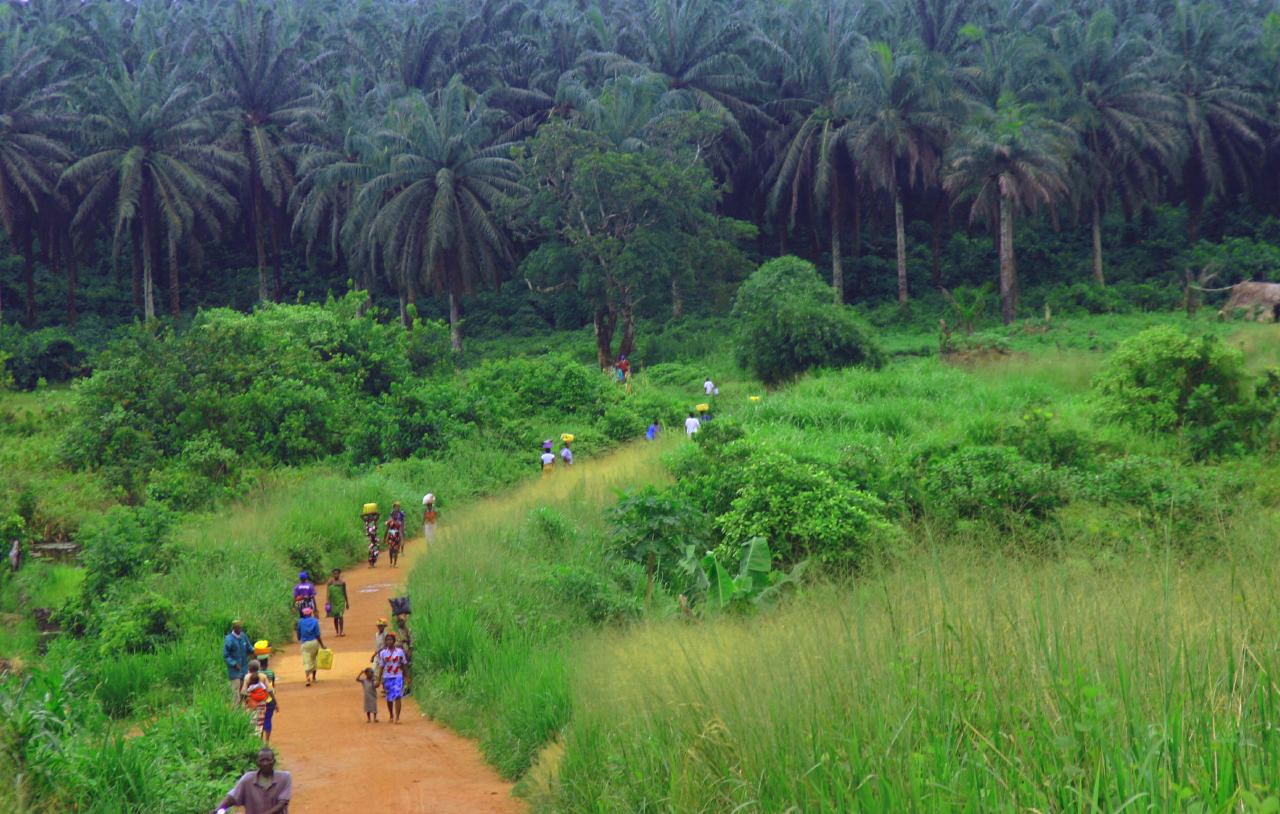

- Map of the Guinean forest–savanna mosaic ecoregion

Ecology
- Realm: Afrotropical
- Biome: tropical and subtropical grasslands, savannas, and shrublands
- Borders: List: Cameroon Highlands forests; Cross–Niger transition forests; Cross–Sanaga–Bioko coastal forests; Eastern Guinean forests; Guinean mangroves; Guinean montane forests; Nigerian lowland forests; Northern Congolian forest–savanna mosaic; West Sudanian savanna; Western Guinean lowland forests

Geography
- Area: 668,905 km^{2} (258,266 mi^{2})
- Countries: List: Benin; Cameroon; Gambia; Ghana; Guinea; Guinea-Bissau; Ivory Coast; Liberia; Nigeria; Senegal; Sierra Leone; Togo

Conservation
- Conservation status: Critical/endangered
- Protected: 107,116 km² (16%)

The Guinean forest-savanna mosaic, also known as the Guinean forest-savanna transition, is a distinctive ecological region located in West Africa. It stretches across several countries, including the Gambia, Senegal, Guinea, Sierra Leone, Liberia, Ivory Coast, Ghana, Togo, Benin, Nigeria, and Cameroon. This region is characterized by a unique blend of forested areas and savannas, creating a diverse and dynamic landscape.

It is an ecoregion of West Africa, a band of interlaced forest, savanna, and grassland running east to west and dividing the tropical moist forests near the coast from the West Sudanian savanna of the interior.

== Setting ==
The Guinean forest–savanna mosaic covers an area of 673,600 square kilometers (260,100 sq mi), extending from western Senegal to eastern Nigeria, and including portions of Gambia, Guinea Bissau, Guinea, Sierra Leone, Côte d'Ivoire, Ghana, Togo, Benin and Cameroon. The Cameroon Highlands of eastern Nigeria and Cameroon separate the Guinean forest–savanna mosaic from the Northern Congolian forest–savanna mosaic, which lies to the east. The Dahomey Gap is a region of Togo and Benin where the forest-savanna mosaic extends to the coast, and separates the Upper Guinean forests of Guinea, Sierra Leone, Liberia, Côte d'Ivoire, and Ghana from the Lower Guinean forests of Nigeria and Cameroon.

== Climate ==
The climate in this region varies depending on the specific location, but it generally experiences a tropical climate with distinct wet and dry seasons. The wet season brings heavy rainfall, while the dry season is characterized by lower precipitation and drier conditions. This ecoregion is situated in the humid tropical savanna zone, where the average yearly high temperatures range from 30 to 33 °C and the lows range from 14 to 21 °C. The annual rainfall typically falls between 1,600 and 2,000 mm, although there are areas in the Dahomey Gap that receive 1,000 mm or less annually.

The Guinean savanna mosaic represents a critical ecological transition zone between the dense, evergreen rainforests to the south and the more open, tree-dotted savannas to the north. This transition creates a unique mix of plant and animal species adapted to varying ecological conditions. Like many ecosystems worldwide, the Guinean forest–savanna mosaic is susceptible to the impacts of climate change. Altered rainfall patterns, increased temperatures, and more frequent extreme weather events have affected the health and composition of this biome.

== Biodiversity ==
The Guinean forest–savanna mosaic is known for its high biological diversity. It is home to a wide range of plant and animal species, including many endemic species that are found nowhere else in the world. Some iconic species found here include chimpanzees, pygmy hippos, forest elephants, and various species of primates and birds. They also include several species of primates, reptiles, amphibians, and plants that have evolved in isolation within this region.

== Vegetation ==
- Forest: The forested areas in this mosaic are primarily composed of tropical rainforests, characterized by high rainfall, high humidity, and diverse flora and fauna. These forests are home to a wide variety of plant species, including towering hardwood trees, lianas, epiphytes, and a rich understory of shrubs and herbs.
- Savanna: The savanna component consists of grasslands interspersed with scattered trees, which are adapted to periodic fires. The savanna ecosystem supports a different set of plant species, including various grasses, shrubs, and acacia trees.

== Flora ==
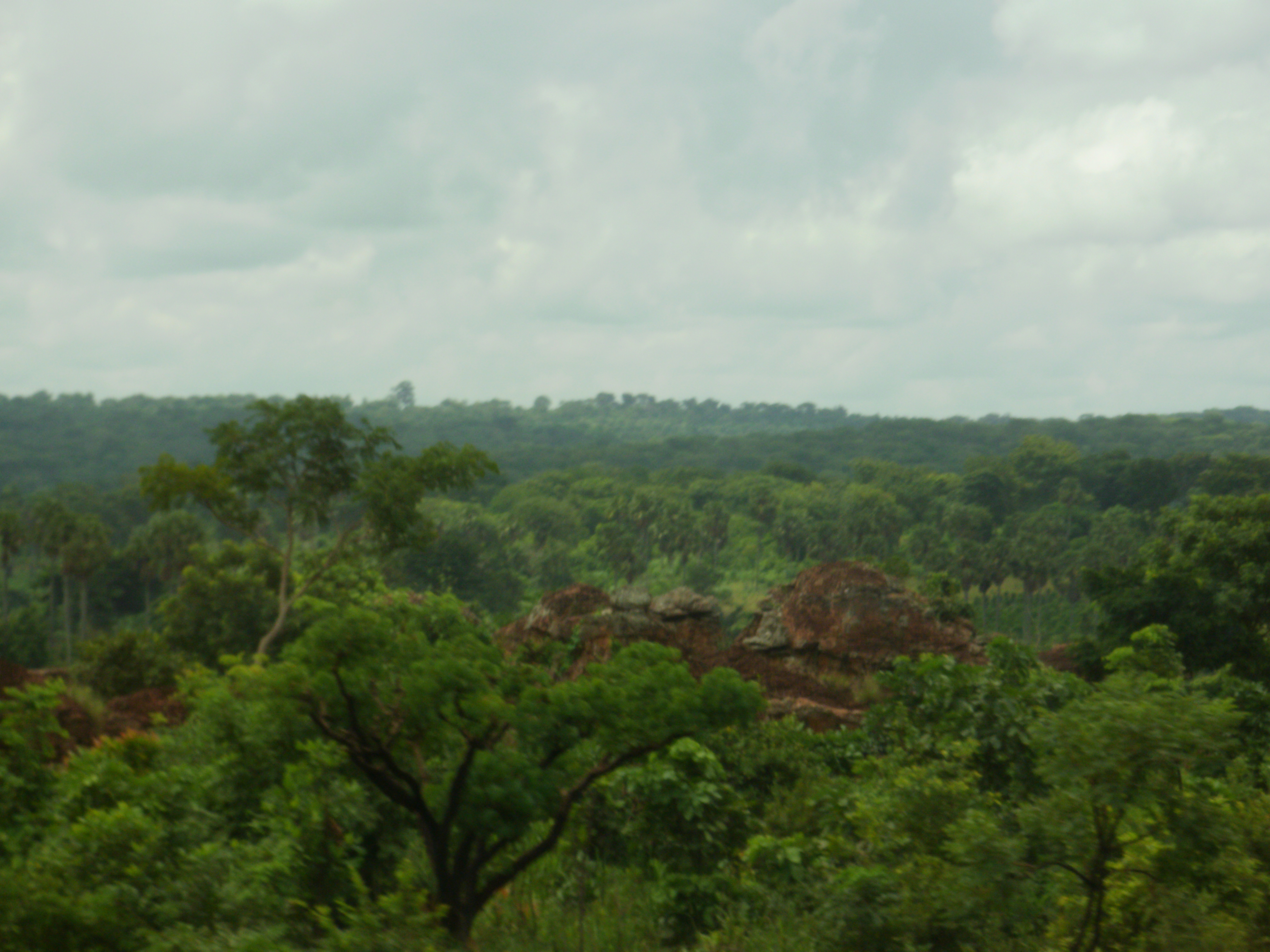
Woodland in Guinea Savanna

This biome is characterized by a mix of forested areas and open savannas. It is often referred to as a mosaic because it consists of a patchwork of different vegetation types. In the forested areas, you can find a mix of evergreen and deciduous trees, while the savanna regions feature grasslands and scattered trees. In terms of plant life, it contains a mix of tree species such as mahogany, iroko, and various species of acacia, alongside grasses and shrubs common to savannas. The region is mainly grassland crossed with trees growing alongside streams and on hillsides, with the constantly occurring fires keeping back the growth of trees in open country. Lophira lanceolata is one of the tree species found that is more resistant to fire than many others.

== Fauna ==
The mixture of forest and grassland provide habitat for a range of species from large mammals such as African leopard, forest elephants, hippopotamus and antelopes such as the red-flanked duiker to the common tortoise as well as more localised species including patas monkeys and Ghana worm lizards (Amphisbaenia). The wetlands in the region are rich in birdlife, including iris glossy starling and black crowned crane.

- Mammals: The Guinean forest–savanna mosaic is home to a wide variety of mammalian species. This includes iconic species such as African elephants, western chimpanzees, and western lowland gorillas. Other notable mammals include leopards, various species of antelope (such as duikers and bushbucks), and a diverse range of primates (like guenons, colobus monkeys, and baboons).
- Birds: The avifauna of this region is highly diverse, with hundreds of species recorded. This includes a mix of forest-dwelling birds like turacos, hornbills, and various species of parrots, as well as savanna-adapted species like raptors, bustards, and various types of weavers.
- Reptiles and Amphibians: The mosaic is also home to a variety of reptiles and amphibians, including numerous snake species, chameleons, crocodiles, and an array of frogs and toads.
- Invertebrates: The biodiversity of invertebrates, including insects and arachnids, is extremely high, with countless species contributing to the overall ecological balance.

== Human settlement ==
The ecoregion covers large areas of many West African nations including:

- Senegal - much of the southern Casamance arm of the country including the city of Ziguinchor.
- All of inland Guinea-Bissau
- The Gambia - in particular, south of the River Gambia
- Guinea - the band of lowland areas parallel to the coast and then running south-east of the central mountains, including the towns of Fria, Kindia and Kissidougou.
- Northern Sierra Leone including the towns of Makeni and Kabala.
- Côte d'Ivoire - a swathe across the middle east from Touba through the country's second-largest city Bouaké.
- A wide strip across Ghana including the country east of Lake Volta, where the main town is Ho.
- Togo - the southern plateau.
- Benin - the southern areas including the city of Bohicon.
- Nigeria - a large area including the cities of Ibadan, which means where the forest meets the savanna, the country's capital Abuja, Lokoja where the River Niger and River Benue meet, Enugu, and Makurdi.

== Threats and Conservation ==
Like many tropical ecosystems, this mosaic is under threat from various human activities. Deforestation due to logging, agriculture expansion, and mining operations pose significant challenges to its conservation. Additionally, infrastructure development and road construction can fragment habitats, making it difficult for wildlife to move between different areas.

- Deforestation and Habitat Loss: One of the most significant threats to the biodiversity of the Guinean forest–savanna mosaic is deforestation. This occurs due to agriculture expansion, logging, and infrastructure development.
- Hunting and Poaching: Unsustainable hunting and poaching for bushmeat and the pet trade can put immense pressure on the local wildlife populations.
- Climate Change: Changes in rainfall patterns, temperature, and other climatic factors can disrupt the delicate ecological balance of the region.
- Conservation Efforts: Several conservation organizations and government agencies are working to protect and restore the biodiversity of this mosaic. This includes the establishment of protected areas, community-based conservation initiatives, and sustainable land-use planning.

== Conservation Initiatives ==
Conservation organizations and governments in the region have recognized the importance of preserving the Guinean forest–savanna mosaic. Efforts have been made to establish protected areas and national parks, such as Taï National Park in Ivory Coast and Gola Rainforest National Park in Sierra Leone and Liberia.

== Protected areas ==
The Guinean forest–savanna mosaic is a biologically diverse and ecologically significant region in West Africa. Its unique blend of forest and savanna habitats, along with its endemic species, make it an area of global importance for conservation efforts. A 2017 assessment found that 107,116 km^{2}, or 16%, of the ecoregion is in protected areas. Protected areas include Upper Niger National Park in Guinea, Dulombi-Boe National Park in Guinea-Bissau, Outamba-Kilimi National Park in Sierra Leone, Mont Sangbé National Park in Ivory Coast, Bui National Park and Digya National Park in Ghana, and Old Oyo National Park and Gashaka-Gumti National Park in Nigeria.

== Research and Monitoring ==
Scientists and researchers are actively studying this region to better understand its ecological dynamics, species distribution, and responses to environmental changes. Some key aspects of this research and monitoring initiative includes:

1. Ecosystem Description
  - Biodiversity: The Guinean forest–savanna mosaic is renowned for its high biodiversity, supporting a wide variety of plant and animal species. This region is home to several endangered and endemic species, such as chimpanzees, pygmy hippos, and various rare plants.
  - Ecotone: It is an ecotone, which means it's the transition zone between two major biomes: the dense tropical rainforests to the south and the open savannas to the north. This unique blend of habitats contributes to its ecological significance.
2. Research Goals
  - Biodiversity Assessment: Researchers aim to conduct comprehensive surveys to document the plant and animal species in the region. This includes identifying and cataloging both common and rare species, which helps in understanding the ecosystem's overall health.
  - Ecosystem Dynamics: Investigating the interactions between the forest and savanna components, such as how fires and land use changes affect the balance between these two ecosystems.
  - Conservation Status: Assessing the conservation status of key species and identifying threats, such as habitat loss, poaching, and climate change, to develop effective conservation strategies.
  - Indigenous Knowledge: Collaborating with local communities to tap into their indigenous knowledge about the ecosystem and its conservation. This local knowledge is invaluable for understanding the region's dynamics.
3. Monitoring and Data Collection
  - Camera Traps: Researchers often use camera traps to capture images of wildlife in the area. This technology allows for non-intrusive monitoring of elusive species.
  - Remote Sensing: Satellite imagery and GIS (Geographic Information Systems) are used to monitor land cover changes, deforestation, and the expansion of agriculture in the region.
  - Field Surveys: Ecologists and biologists conduct field surveys to collect data on plant and animal populations, habitat quality, and ecological processes.
  - Weather and Climate Data: Monitoring meteorological and climate data helps understand how changing weather patterns impact the ecosystem.
4. Conservation and Policy Implications
  - Protected Areas: Research findings often lead to the creation or expansion of protected areas or national parks. These areas help conserve the unique biodiversity found in the Guinean forest–savanna mosaic.
  - Community Engagement: Engaging local communities in conservation efforts is critical. This includes providing alternative livelihoods to reduce their reliance on forest resources and raising awareness about the importance of conservation.
  - Policy Advocacy: Sharing research results with policymakers can influence decisions related to land use, logging, agriculture, and other activities that can impact the ecosystem.
5. Challenges and Threats
  - Habitat Loss: The conversion of natural habitat for agriculture, logging, and infrastructure development is a significant threat.
  - Illegal Wildlife Trade: The region is also a hotspot for illegal wildlife trade, posing a severe risk to many endangered species.
  - Climate Change: Shifts in weather patterns and increased droughts and wildfires due to climate change can affect the balance between the forest and savanna components.
