= Pico Basilé =

Tallest mountain of Equatorial Guinea

- Pico de Santa Isabel, Clarence Peak
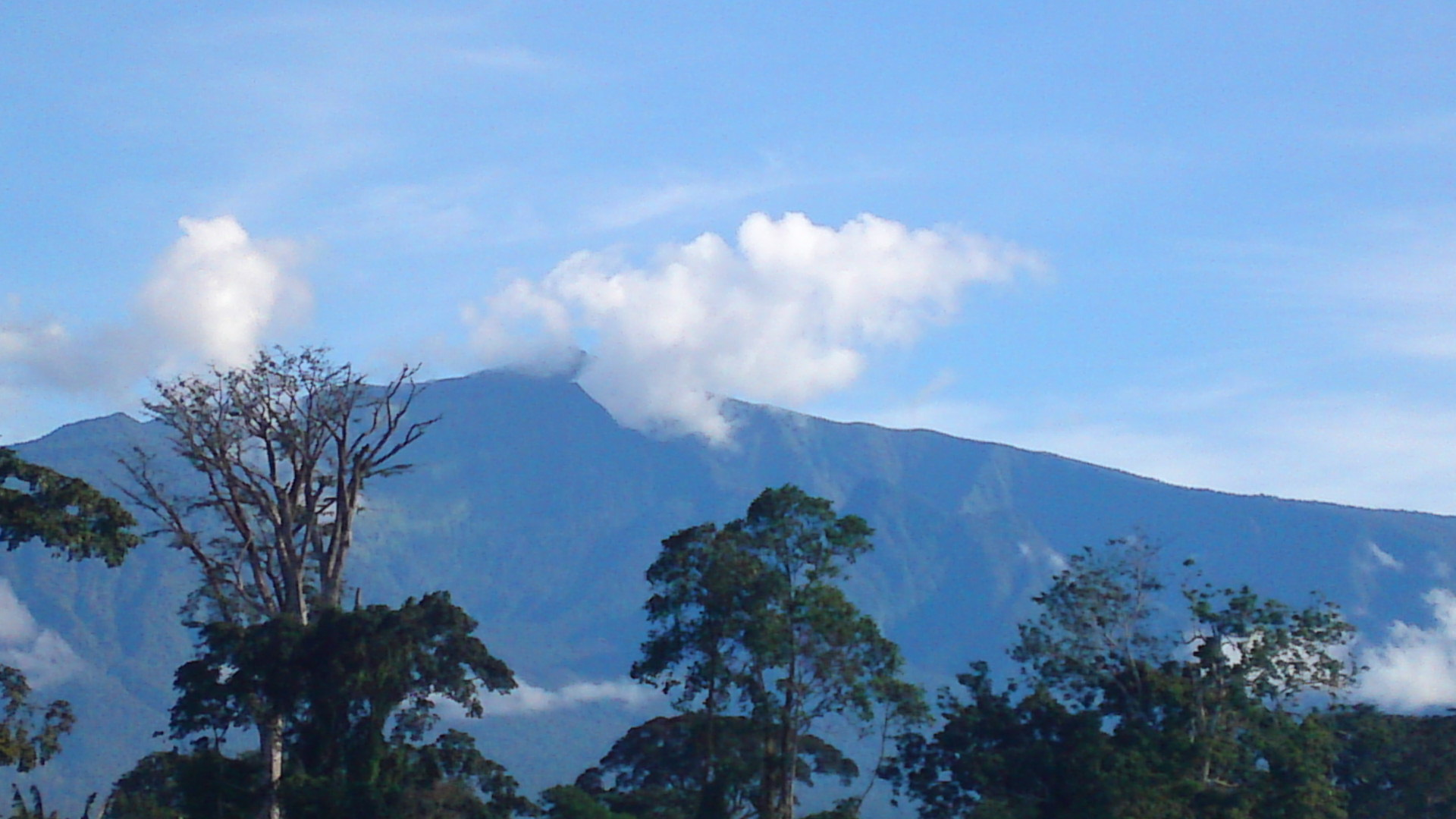

Highest point
- Elevation: 3,011 m (9,879 ft)
- Prominence: 3,011 m (9,879 ft); Ranked 90th
- Listing: Country high point Ultra, Ribu
- Coordinates: 3°35′16″N 8°45′42″E

Geography
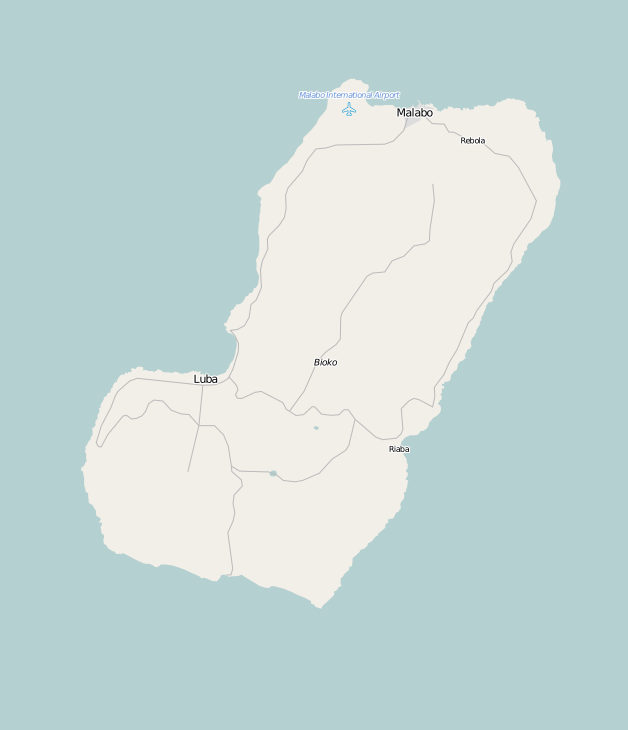
- Location within Bioko Location within Equatorial Guinea
- Location: Bioko, Equatorial Guinea

Geology
- Mountain type: Shield volcano
- Last eruption: 1923

Pico Basilé (formerly Pico de Santa Isabel or Clarence Peak), located on the island of Bioko, is the tallest mountain of Equatorial Guinea. With an elevation of 3,011 metres (9,879 feet), it is the summit of the largest and highest of three overlapping basaltic shield volcanoes which form the island. From the summit, Mount Cameroon can be seen to the north-east. Pico Basilé lies close to the city of Malabo. The very top is used as a broadcast transmitting station for RTVGE (Radio Television Guinea Ecuatorial) and microwave relay station for various communication networks.

The peak forms a part of Pico Basilé National Park, created in April 2000 The boundaries of Bioko Norte and Sur run near the summit. All three shield volcanoes on Bioko Island are listed in the Smithsonian Global Volcanism Program’s database of active volcanoes, though only Pico Basilé has erupted in historic times (most recently in 1923).

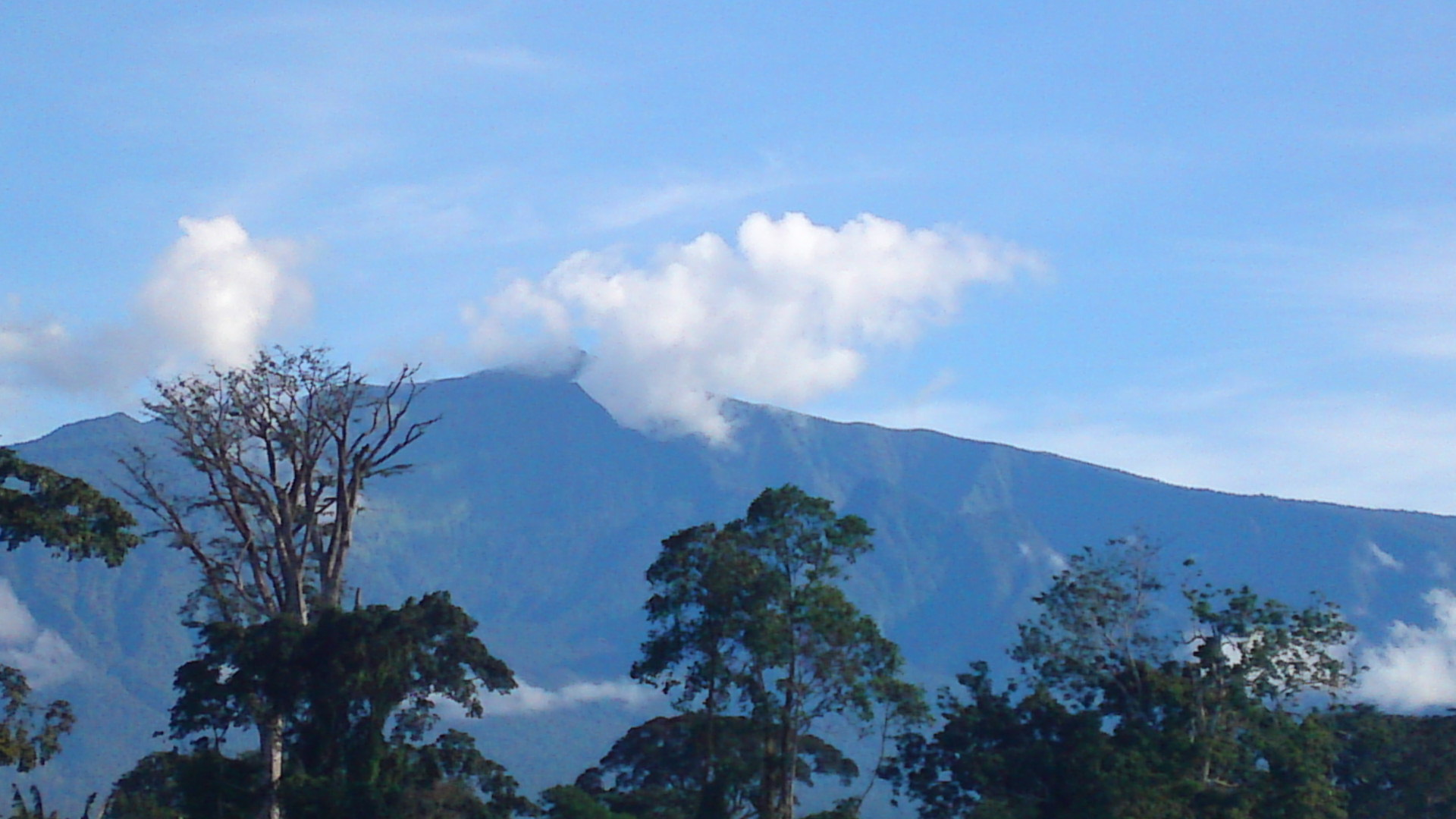
Pico Basilé

Bioko was formed along the Cameroon line, a major northeast-trending geologic fault that runs from the Atlantic Ocean into Cameroon. This line includes other volcanic islands in the Gulf of Guinea, such as Annobón, Príncipe and São Tomé, along with the massive stratovolcano of Mount Cameroon. The other island volcanoes to the southwest of Bioko Island are extinct.

== Flora and fauna ==
Part of the Cameroon line, the flora and fauna of Pico Basilé, and Bioko as a whole, are similar to those of the montane regions of adjacent Cameroon and Nigeria. Multiple range-restricted species occur on Pico Basilé, and one bird, the Bioko speirops Zoterops brunneus, is wholly restricted to the volcano's higher elevations.

== History ==
The island was inhabited in the middle of the first millennium BC by Bantu tribes from the mainland, who formed the Bubi ethnic group. Unlike other islands in the area, Bioko had an indigenous African population. The Bubi speak a Bantu language. The island has probably been inhabited by this or other Bantu-speaking groups since before the 7th century BC.

In 1472, the Portuguese navigator Fernão do Pó was the first European to sight the island while seeking a path to India.

The first ascent of the mountain by Europeans was made by English commanders between 1827 and 1828 under the Owen expedition. Its first official ascent was made in 1839 by the British John Beecroft who was later governor of the island that was once Fernando Po, now Bioko.

== See also ==
- List of volcanoes in Equatorial Guinea
- Cameroon line

== Sources ==
- "Santa Isabel". Global Volcanism Program. Smithsonian Institution.
- Bioko Biodiversity Protection Program
