= Dahomey Gap =

Region of savannah in West Africa

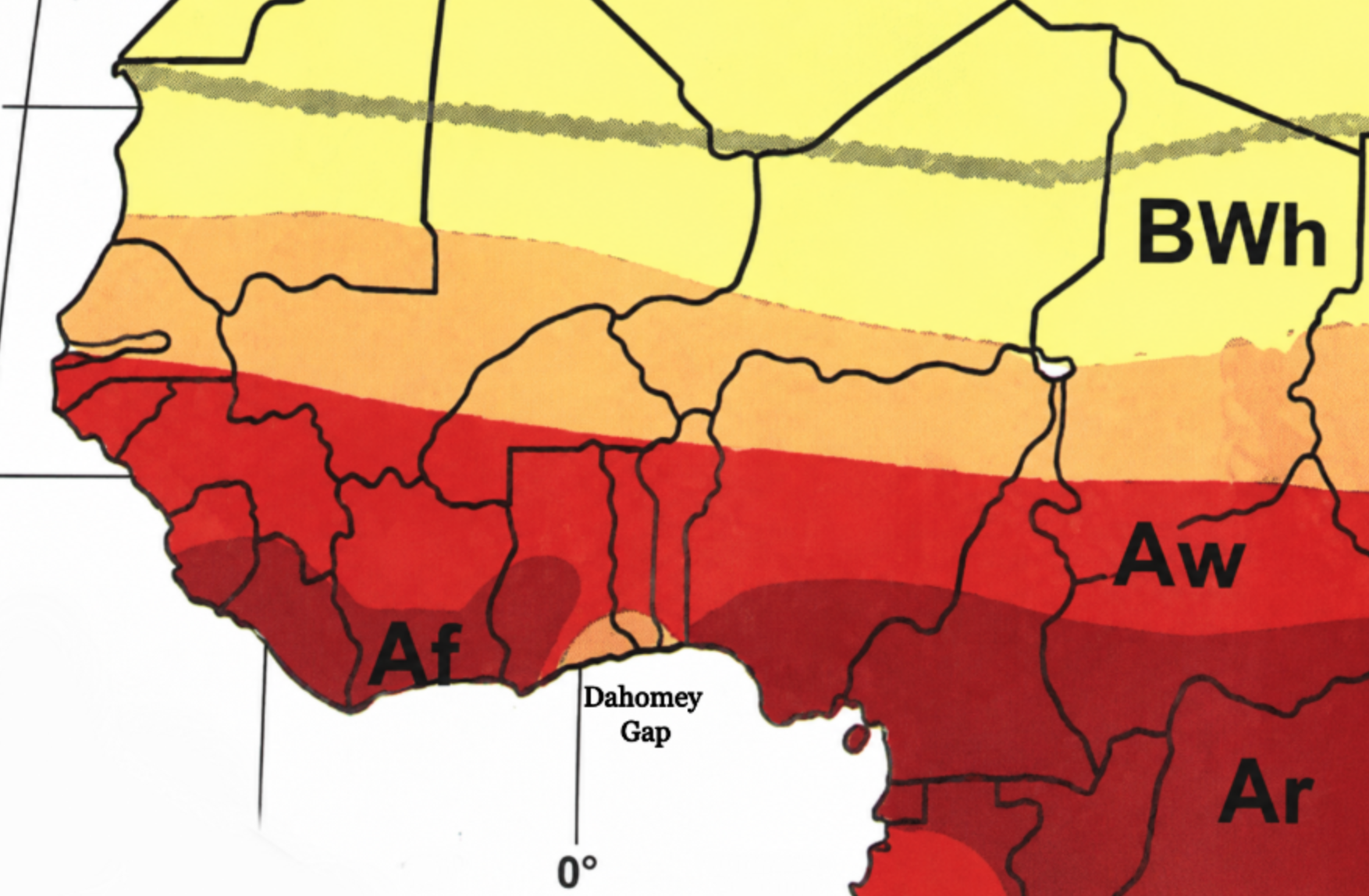
Trewartha climate classification map of West Africa showing the much drier Dahomey Gap region parallel to the Guinean Gulf Coast. Its climate is much more comparable to the semi-arid steppe/savanna climate of Northern West Africa, than to the surrounding region, splitting the Guinean high-forest area (Ar) in two.

The Guinean forest–savanna mosaic bioregion sweeping southwards towards the coastline in the Dahomey Gap, separating the Upper and Lower Guinean forests.

In West Africa, the Dahomey Gap refers to a portion of the Lower Guinea region, where the predominant climate and vegetation type is open savannah grassland bordering on semi-arid along the Gulf of Guinea coast and a slightly wetter, mixed Guinean forest–savanna mosaic behind the coast. The gap (region) is around 200 km or 120 mi wide, and can be found between southeastern Ghana and southwestern Nigeria, taking in southern parts of Benin and Togo, thus separating the forest zone that covers much of the southern parts of West Africa into two separate (disconnected) parts. The forest region west of the gap is called the Upper Guinean forests or Guinean forest zone, extending from Sierra Leone to western Ghana, and the portion east of the gap is called the Lower Guinean forests, Lower Guinean-Congolian forests, or Congolian Forest Zone, extending from southwestern Nigeria to the Congo Basin.

The major cities in the Gap are; Accra, Tema, Lomé, Ouidah, Cotonou, Porto-Novo and Badagry, which sits around its eastern edge.

== Historical relevance ==
The existence of the Dahomey gap and its comparative dryness allowed West African states like the Oyo Empire (itself an inland savanna entity) to operate a cavalry force all the way down to the very coastline, more than 320 km or 200 mi away from its capital city at Oyo ile and still keep its horses relatively healthy, taking in various Gbe and Western Yoruba speaking polities. For this same reason, Oyo experienced much more difficulties expanding in eastern and southeastern Yorubaland. The kingdom of Dahomey also exploited the vast openness of the area to push south towards the sea, overwhelming the independent coastal kingdoms of Xweda (Whydah) and Allada (Ardra), and conduct slave raiding expeditions west/north (initially), and east (later) into neighbouring Aja, Mahi and Yoruba territories. The location of most of Oyo country (Northwest Yorubaland) in an area partly influenced by the conditions in the gap was also partly responsible (although not primarily) for its eventual fall and dissolution in the 1820s—1830s after it was overrun by muslim forces from further north.

The British captured Accra in 1874, and in 1877, at the end of the second Anglo-Asante War, the city replaced Cape Coast as the administrative capital of the British Gold Coast, a title it continues to hold till date. This decision was made based on climate-related reasons, since Accra, firmly within the Dahomey gap, had a drier climate relative to Cape Coast outside it, and was therefore not home to the tsetse fly, which facilitated the extensive use of animal transport. Until this time, the settlement of Accra was confined between Ussher Fort to the east and the Korle Lagoon to the west.

== Causes of dryness ==
The dryness of the Dahomey Gap is unusual, given that it lies surrounded by a very wet monsoon belt on all sides, without mountains to block moisture. Yet, Accra, which is in the heart of the Gap, receives only 720 mm (28 in) of rainfall per year — less than half the amount needed to sustain tropical rainforest (which would be expected at a latitude of 6° N).

The cause of the dryness of the Dahomey Gap can simply be explained thus:

- In northern winter, high pressure centred on the Sahara sends dry northeasterly trade winds known as the harmattan over West Africa, creating a general dry season, including over the Gap.
- In northern summer, an enormous low pressure system known as the monsoon forms over the huge Africa-Asia-Europe landmass. Centred over approximately Rajasthan and prevented by the huge barrier of the Himalayas from moving further west, it extends a strong trough over West Africa. This trough sends warm and saturated westerly winds over West Africa, creating a wet season peaking in June on the coast (as the trough moves north) and in August inland.
- The coast in the region of the highest rainfall (Guinea, Sierra Leone, Liberia) slopes from southeast to northwest. This aspect means that the moist westerlies are forced to shed enormous quantities of moisture, allowing rainforest to thrive despite a distinct dry season.
- In the Dahomey Gap, however, the coast slopes in such a way (northeast to southwest) that the rain-bearing westerlies flow parallel to the coast. This means that the low-level flow is divergent, so that the winds are not forced to give up nearly so much moisture, and thus the climate is much drier, with only a brief rainy season in May and June. Consequently, an open savanna prevails adapted to the moderate rainfall and high evaporation in the hot temperatures.

== Geological history ==
Evidence from biogeography suggests that the Dahomey Gap has had significance for up to 90 million years. Murphy and Collier, in their analysis of two aplocheiloid fish genera, show a split in the African species which they attribute to the presence of an epicontinental sea between the late Cenomanian and early Eocene. This discontinuity had earlier been noted in plant species by White and is supported by an analysis of the Coffea clade by Maurin et al.

The Dahomey Gap has existed in its present form for only about four thousand years. For most of the Quaternary, dry conditions due to a much colder Atlantic Ocean (aided by extensive cold currents from ice sheets in Europe and North America) have meant that the present-day forest zone has supported very little or no rainforest. In interglacial periods, however, rainfall throughout West Africa has often been so heavy that the Gap has become wet enough to support rainforest, thus eliminating the savanna.
