= Western Guinean lowland forests =

Forest in West Africa

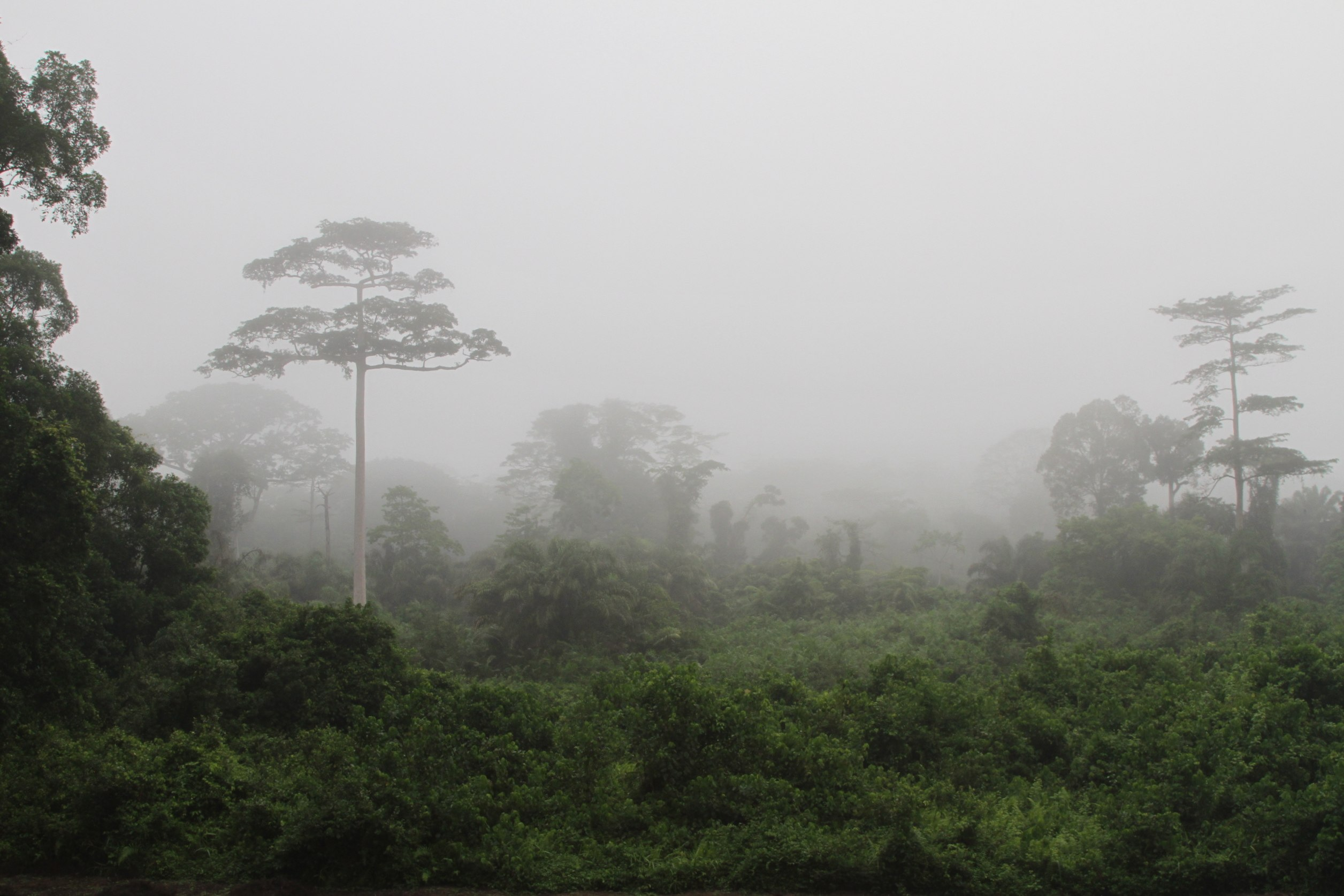
- Taï National Park, Ivory Coast

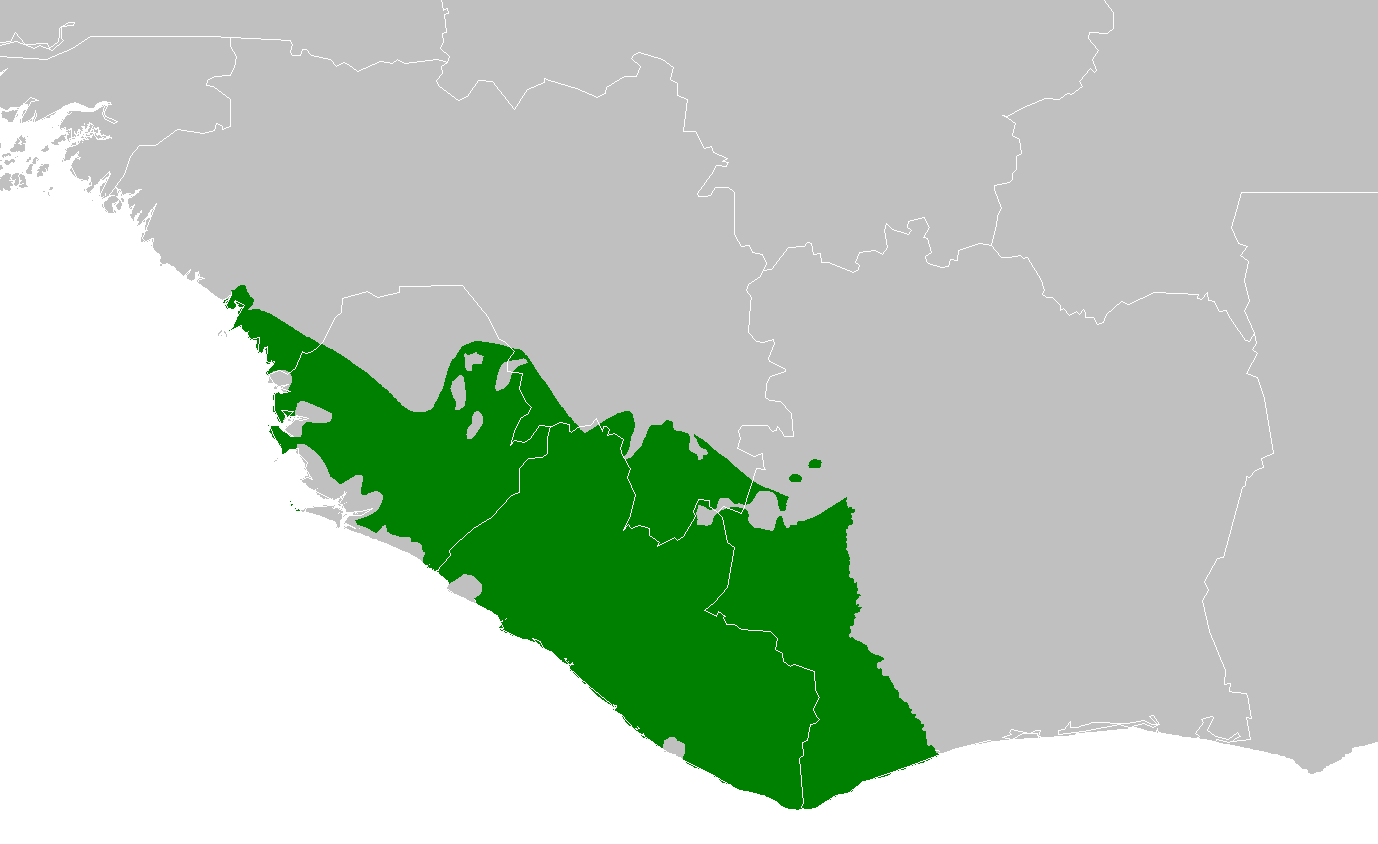
- Map of the Western Guinean lowland forests

Ecology
- Realm: Afrotropical
- Biome: tropical and subtropical moist broadleaf forests
- Borders: Eastern Guinean forests; Guinean forest-savanna mosaic, Guinean mangroves

Geography
- Area: 203,842 km^{2} (78,704 mi^{2})
- Countries: Guinea; Ivory Coast; Liberia, Sierra Leone
- Coordinates: 6.9°N 6.55°W

Conservation
- Conservation status: Vulnerable
- Global 200: yes
- Protected: 24,028 km^{2}%

The Western Guinean lowland forests ecoregion (WWF #AT0130) is a tropical moist broadleaf forest ecoregion of West Africa. It is centered on Liberia, with portions in surrounding countries. It is the westernmost tropical rainforest in Africa, and has high levels of species endemism, with over 200 species of endemic plants.

== Geography ==
The ecoregion includes the lowland forests extending from the Atlantic Ocean a few hundred kilometres inland, and from western Ivory Coast across Liberia, southeastern Guinea, most of Sierra Leone, and into southwest Guinea.

The terrain is relatively flat, with a mean elevation of 2,225 meters and a few isolated mountains that reach a high point of 1,290 metres (4,230 ft). Major rivers include the Sewa River, Mano River, Saint Paul River, Cavalla River and Sassandra River. The soils are poor, heavily leached lateritic.

The Sassandra River of Ivory Coast separates the Western Guinean forests from the Eastern Guinean forests which lie to the east. Inland and to the west, the Western Guinean forests transition to the Guinean forest-savanna mosaic, and to the Guinean montane forests at higher elevations.

The Western Guinean forests, together with the other tropical moist forests of West Africa, is included within Conservation International's Guinean Forests of West Africa biodiversity hotspot.

== Climate ==
The climate of the ecoregion is Tropical savanna climate - dry winter (Köppen climate classification (Aw)). Temperatures can average from 30 to 33 degrees (C) in the hot months, 12 to 12 (C) in the colder months. The rainy season is May to October, with precipitation reaching 3,300 mm/year or more in the higher regions.

== Flora and fauna ==
Closed forest covers two-thirds of the ecoregion, mostly broadleaf evergreen trees, but much of this is second-growth or otherwise disturbed by human activities. Another 22% of the terrain is open forest or shrub. The term ‘farmbush’ has been applied to the degraded secondary growth that follows slash-and-burn agriculture. Common trees include Dacryodes klaineana, Strombosia pustulata, Garcinia oleosperma, Coula edulis, and Diospyros sanza-minika. Semi-deciduous forests occur at lower elevations into Guinea.

Because the wet areas expanded and contracted during the Ice Age, 'islands' of specialized species developed. Some of these areas of diversified floral and faunal communities are in protected areas.

== Protected areas ==
A 2017 assessment found that 24,028 km^{2}, or 12%, of the ecoregion is in protected areas. Only 2% of the unprotected area is covered by relatively-intact forest. Protected areas include:

- Taï National Park in Ivory Coast,
- Lofa-Mano National Park, in Liberia,
- Sapo National Park in Liberia,
- Diecké Forest Reserve in Guinea, and
- Kangari Hills Forest Reserve, in Sierra Leone.

== See also ==
- Upper Guinean forests
