= Bioko Norte =

Province of Equatorial Guinea

- Province
- Coordinates: 3°40′48″N 8°46′48″E
- Country: Equatorial Guinea
- Capital: Rebola

Area
  - Total: 776 km^{2} (300 sq mi)

Population (2015)
  - Total: 300,374
  - Density: 387/km^{2} (1,000/sq mi)
- ISO 3166 code: GQ-BN

Bioko Norte (Spanish pronunciation: [ˈbjoko ˈnoɾte]) is the second-most populated of the eight provinces of Equatorial Guinea, after the Litoral province. It contained 300,374 of the island's 335,048 inhabitants in 2015, sub-divided into 2 districts - Malabo (271,008) and Baney (27,366). Both the provincial capital, Rebola, and the former national capital, Malabo are located here. Heavily forested with little urban development, the southern central part includes part of the Parque Nacional del Pico Basilé, a 330 square kilometres (130 sq mi) national park which was established in 2000.

== Geography ==
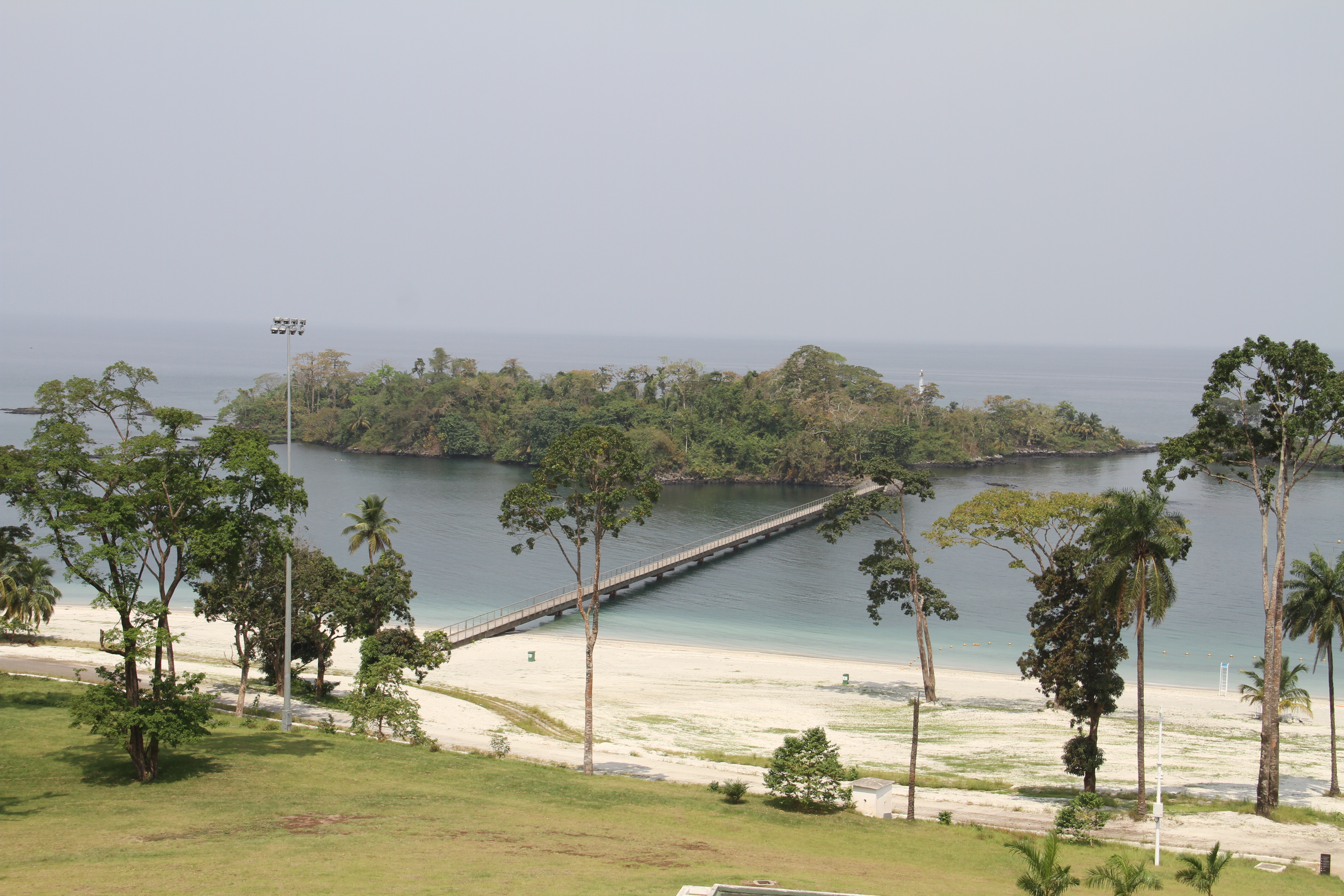
Islotes Horacio, Bioko Norte

Bioko Norte occupies the northern part of the island of Bioko, the remainder of which is in Bioko Sur. In the northern part are Rebola and the former national Equatorial Guinean capital, Malabo. The smaller settlement of Santiago de Baney lies in northeastern part of the province. On the northeast coast is the resort of Sipopo, which contains a 200-room hotel run by the Sofitel hotel chain, Sofitel Malabo Sipopo Le Golf. The village of Basupu is situated to the northwest of Malabo, along the main road.

The province is dominated by tropical rainforest with little urban development. There are anti-personnel mines in the forests of Rebola, Baney and the Moka Valley. The southern central part is heavily forested and hilly in the Parque Nacional del Pico Basilé area. The national park spans the southern central part of the province and the northern part of Bioko Sur Province. The 330 square kilometres (130 sq mi) park was established in 2000. The uninhabited island of Islote Horacio (3°45′33″N 8°54′30″E) is located off the northeast coast.

A clickable map of Equatorial Guinea exhibiting its two regions and eight provinces. The island nation of São Tomé and Príncipe is not part of Equatorial Guinea.

== Demographics ==
There are significant populations of Bubi people in the province, who speak the Bubi language. The poet Behori Sipi Botau (born 1960), who hails from Rebola, and now living in the United States, is of Bubi ancestry.
