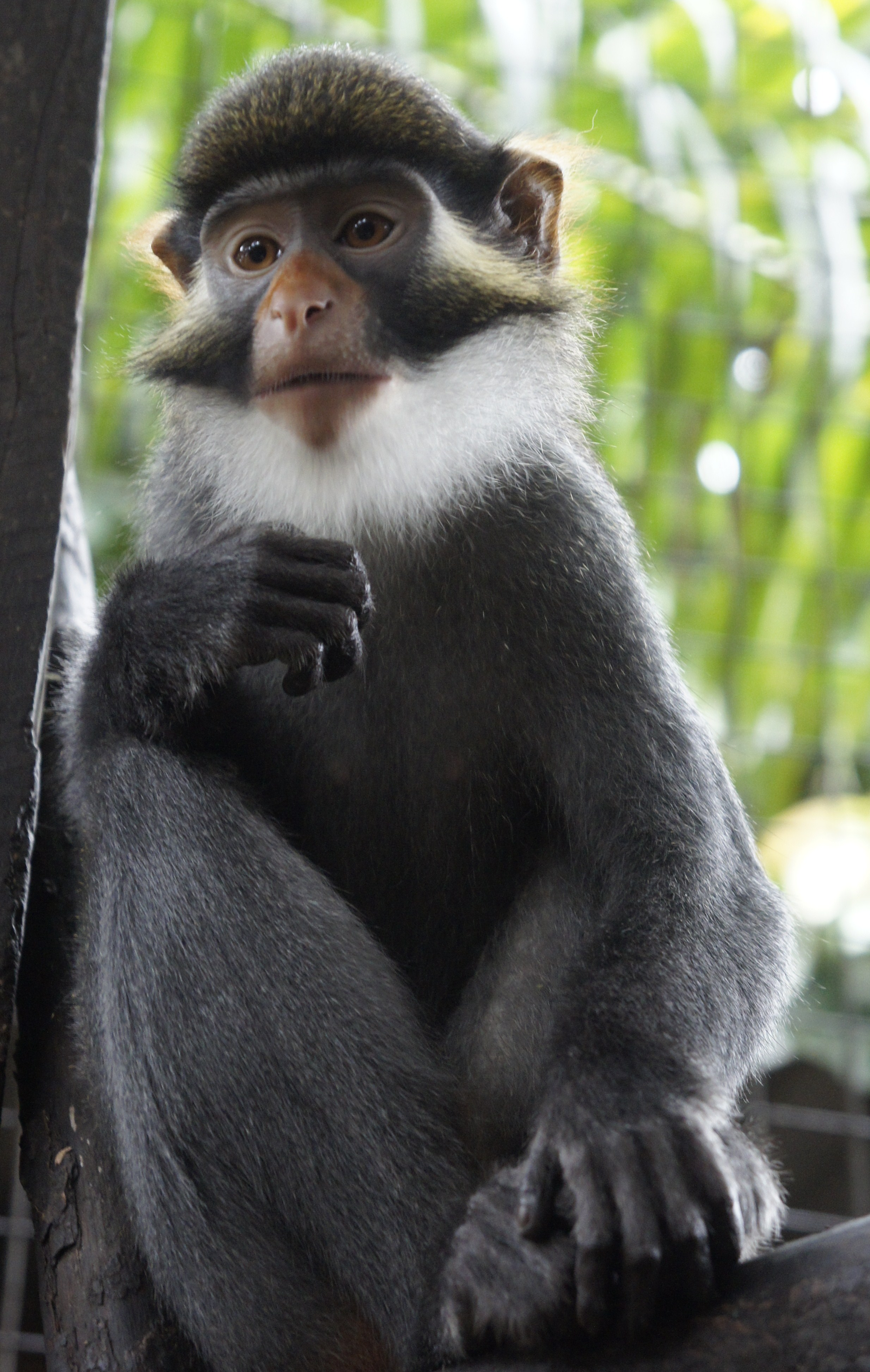

Conservation status
- Vulnerable (IUCN 3.1)

Scientific classification
- Kingdom: Animalia
- Phylum: Chordata
- Class: Mammalia
- Infraclass: Placentalia
- Order: Primates
- Family: Cercopithecidae
- Genus: Cercopithecus
- Species: C. erythrotis

Binomial name
- Cercopithecus erythrotis Waterhouse, 1838
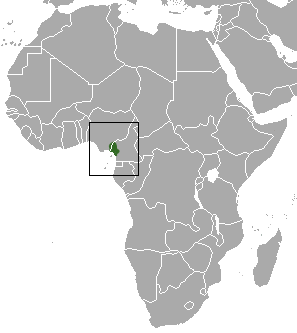
- Red-eared guenon range

= Red-eared guenon =

Species of Old World monkey

The red-eared guenon (Cercopithecus erythrotis), also called red-eared monkey or russet-eared guenon, is a primate species in the family Cercopithecidae. It is native to subtropical and tropical moist lowland forests in Cameroon, Equatorial Guinea and Nigeria. It is listed as Vulnerable on the IUCN Red List and is threatened by habitat loss, illegal bushmeat hunting and pet trade.

== Description ==
The red-eared guenon is a small, colourful monkey with distinctive facial markings which involve blue fur around its eyes, a brick-red nose and ears, and yellow cheeks. The silky fur on the body consists of banded brown and pale hairs with grey limbs and a long, red tail. The long tails are partially prehensile and are used by infants to cling to the female. The red-eared guenon is an unobtrusive species which produces a quiet trill, unlike the loud long-distance calls made by other guenons. Males average 420 mm head and bodylength, with a 609 mm long tail, females are smaller with a mean head and body length of 384 mm and an average tail length of 553 mm.

== Distribution and subspecies ==
There are two recognised subspecies, which are listed below with their distributions:

- Cercopithecus erythrotis camerunensis Hayman, 1940 Cameroon Red-eared Monkey: from the Cross River in south eastern Nigeria and to just north of the Sanaga River in south western Cameroon.
- Cercopithecus erythrotis erythrotis Waterhouse, 1838 Bioko Red-eared Monkey:Bioko island in Equatorial Guinea.

== Habitat ==
The red-eared guenon is found in primary and secondary lowland tropical and sub-montane moist forest, and sometimes lives in close proximity to humans, as on Bioko.

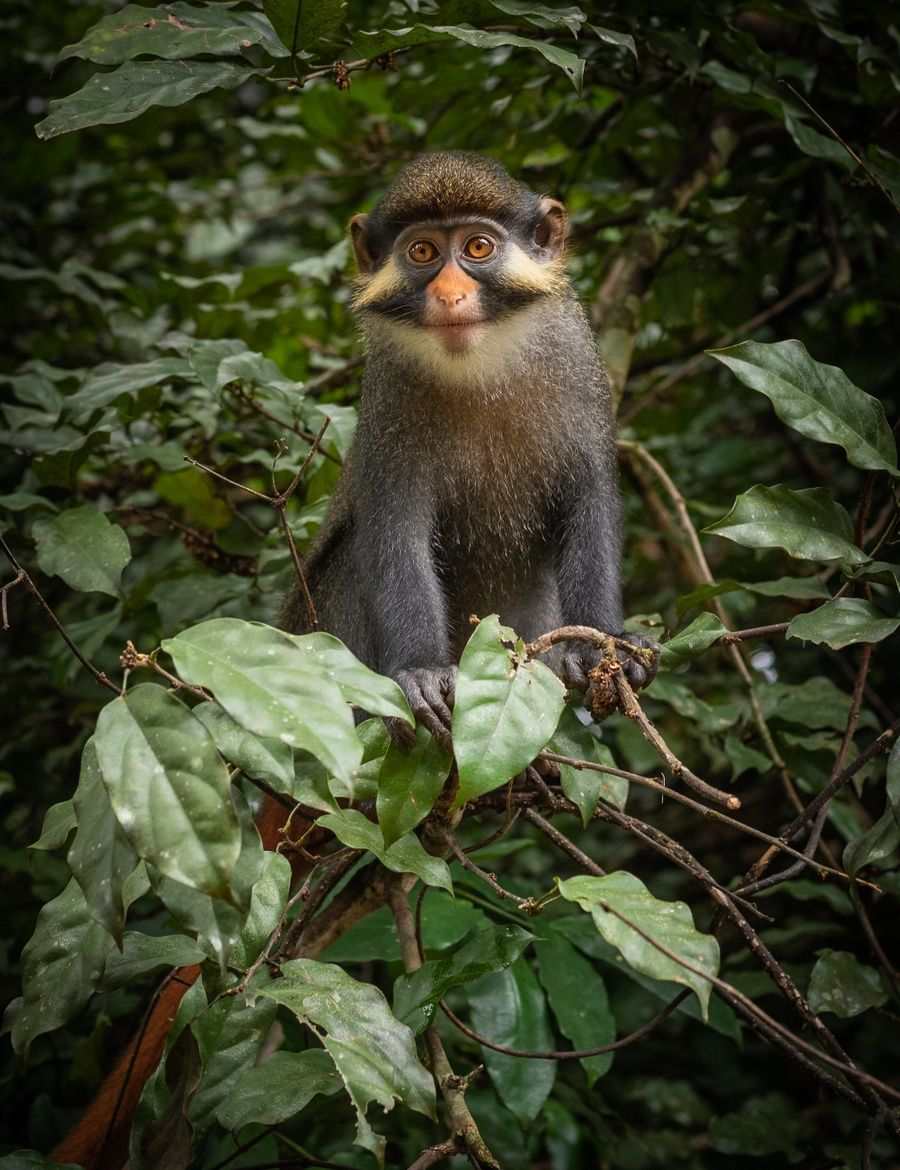
Rescued red-eared guenon in Boki, Cross River, Nigeria

== Behaviour and ecology ==
The red-eared guenon is omnivorous and has been recorded eating fruit, leaves, shoots and insects, the latter are important for nutrition, especially for pregnant and lactating females. The red-eared guenon normally forms groups consisting of at least one adult male and around ten females with young which are not as hierarchical as some primate societies. They are territorial but they usually avoid conflict with other groups. The breeding biology of red-eared guenons is little known but similar species give birth to a single infant every one to three years, with pregnancy taking five or six months.

== Threats ==
The red-eared guenon is threatened by deforestation and by the bushmeat trade, particularly on Bioko, where it is frequently recorded in bushmeat market in Malabo. In 2006, it was estimated that about 3,400 red-eared guenons are hunted yearly in the Cross-Sanaga-Bioko coastal forests for the bushmeat trade.
