= Cross–Sanaga–Bioko coastal forests =

Tropical forest ecoregion of west-central Africa

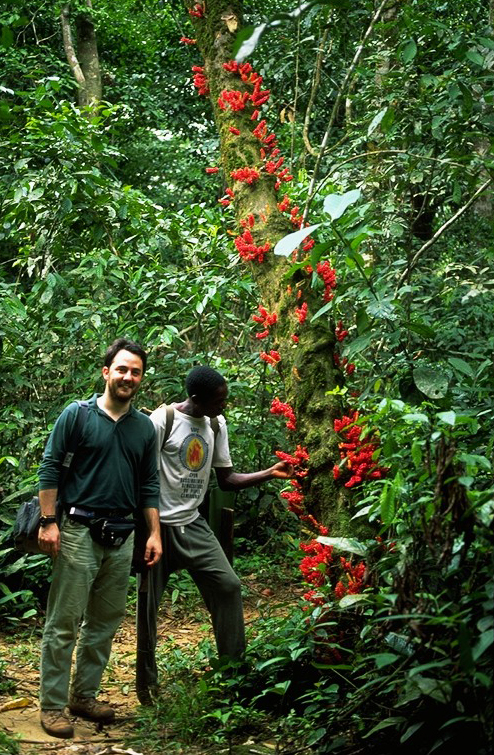
- Korup National Park in Cameroon

- Map of the Cross–Sanaga–Bioko coastal forests

Ecology
- Realm: Afrotropical
- Biome: Tropical and subtropical moist broadleaf forests
- Borders: List: Atlantic Equatorial coastal forests; Cameroonian Highlands forests; Cross–Niger transition forests; Guinean forest–savanna mosaic; Mount Cameroon and Bioko montane forests

Geography
- Area: 51,661 km^{2} (19,946 mi^{2})
- Countries: Cameroon; Equatorial Guinea, Nigeria
- Coordinates: 5.8°N 8.8°E

Conservation
- Conservation status: critical
- Protected: 26 protected; 13,197 km^{2} (5,095 sq mi)%

The Cross–Sanaga–Bioko coastal forests are a tropical moist broadleaf forest ecoregion of west-central Africa. This is a lush forest, rich in flora and birdlife.

== Location and description ==
The region includes the lowland and coastal forests of southeastern Nigeria, southwestern Cameroon, and the lowlands of the island of Bioko, covering an area of 52,200 km^{2} (20,200 sq mi). The ecoregion extends from the Cross River in southeastern Nigeria to the Sanaga River in southeastern Cameroon, and up to 300 km (190 mi) inland from the Atlantic coast. In Nigeria the region more or less covers Cross River State.

The highlands of Mount Cameroon and of Bioko island, above 900 meters elevation, are a distinct ecoregion, the Mount Cameroon and Bioko montane forests, as are the Cameroonian Highlands forests further inland. To the west, across the Cross River, lies the Cross–Niger transition forests ecoregion. Towards the drier interior, the coastal forests transition to the Guinean forest–savanna mosaic to the north and the Northern Congolian forest–savanna mosaic to the east. South of the Sanaga River along the coast lies the Atlantic Equatorial coastal forests ecoregion.

The climate is wet with heavy rainfall all year round and many rivers cross the region as well as the Cross and the Sanaga.

== Flora ==
The area is home to over 3,000 endemic species of plant, half of those found in West Africa, with nearly 2,000 found in Cameroon's Korup National Park alone.

== Fauna ==
Wildlife in the area includes forest elephants and many primates such as Cross River gorillas and chimpanzees (particularly in Cross River National Park in Nigeria), while Preuss's red colobus (Procolobus pennanti preussi) is found only in this ecoregion and a number of others are nearly endemic including red-eared guenon (Cercopithecus erythrotis), crowned guenon (Cercopithecus pogonias), drills (Mandrillus leucophaeus), northern needle-clawed bushbaby (Euoticus pallidus), and Pennant's colobus, one population of which is found on Bioko. There is also a great variety of amphibians and reptiles including the goliath frog. The forests are also extremely rich in butterflies including the Charaxes superbus and Charaxes acraeoides.

== Threats ==
In 2006, it was estimated that annually more than 1.3 million mammals, about 64,650 reptiles and at least 7,700 birds are hunted in the Cross–Sanaga–Bioko coastal forests for the bushmeat trade.

== Conservation ==
A 2017 assessment found that 13,197 km^{2} (5,095 sq mi) , or 26%, of the ecoregion is in protected areas. One of the largest blocks of forest is in and around Korup National Park.

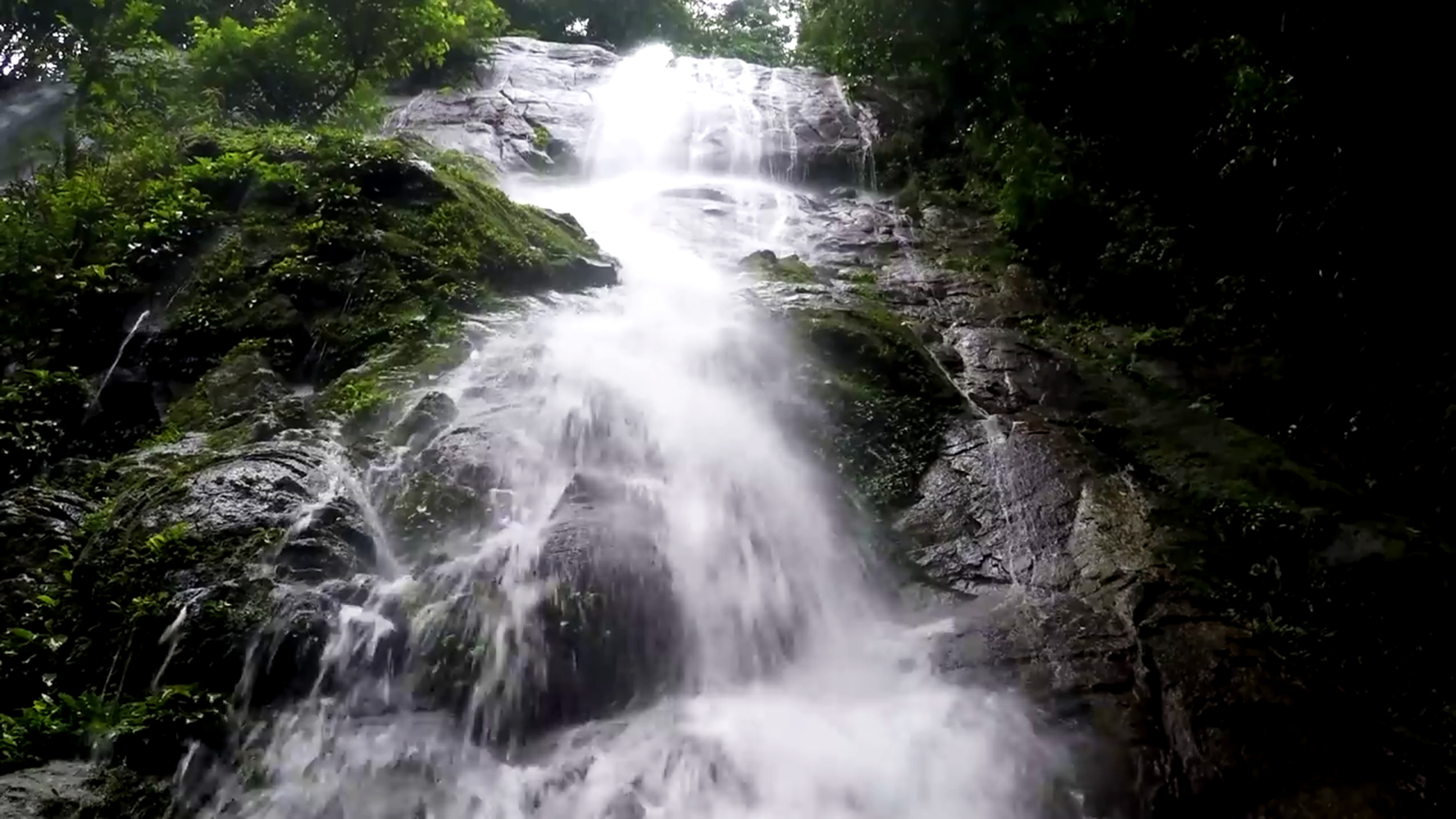
Falling Waters in Korup National Park

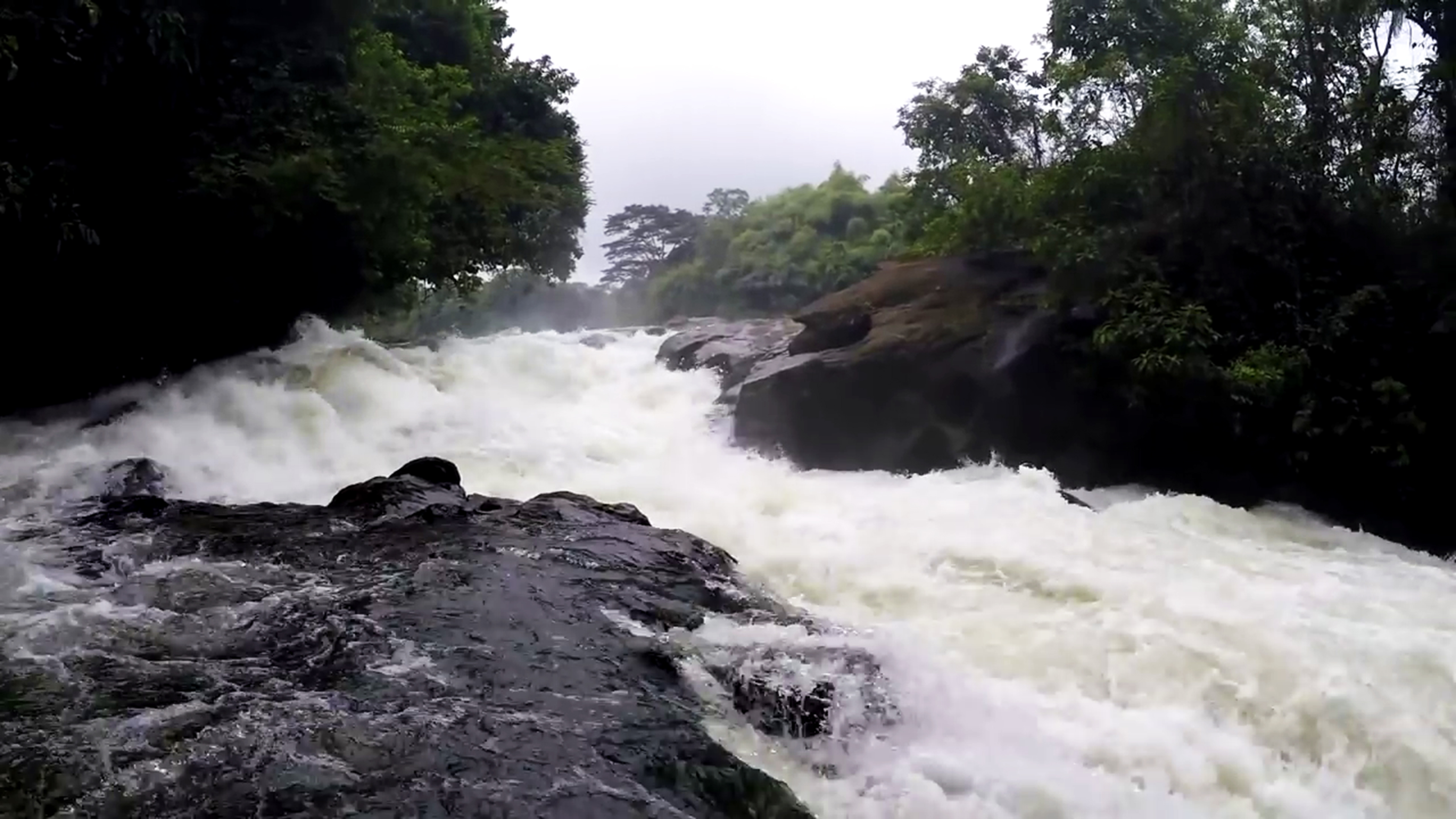
Korup National Park

== Visiting the region ==
Korup National Park in Cameroon is one of the most accessible ways into the forest, while in Nigeria Cross River State can be accessed from the capital Calabar, where there is a drill monkey sanctuary and from Calabar one can reach the Cross River National Park.
