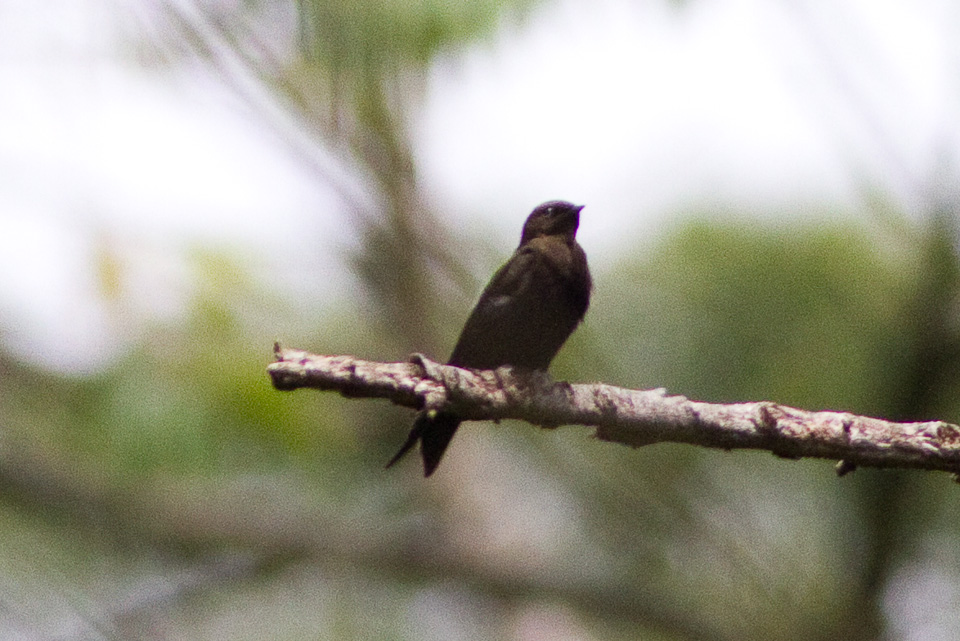

Conservation status
- Least Concern (IUCN 3.1)

Scientific classification
- Kingdom: Animalia
- Phylum: Chordata
- Class: Aves
- Order: Passeriformes
- Family: Hirundinidae
- Genus: Psalidoprocne
- Species: P. fuliginosa

Binomial name
- Psalidoprocne fuliginosa Shelley, 1887
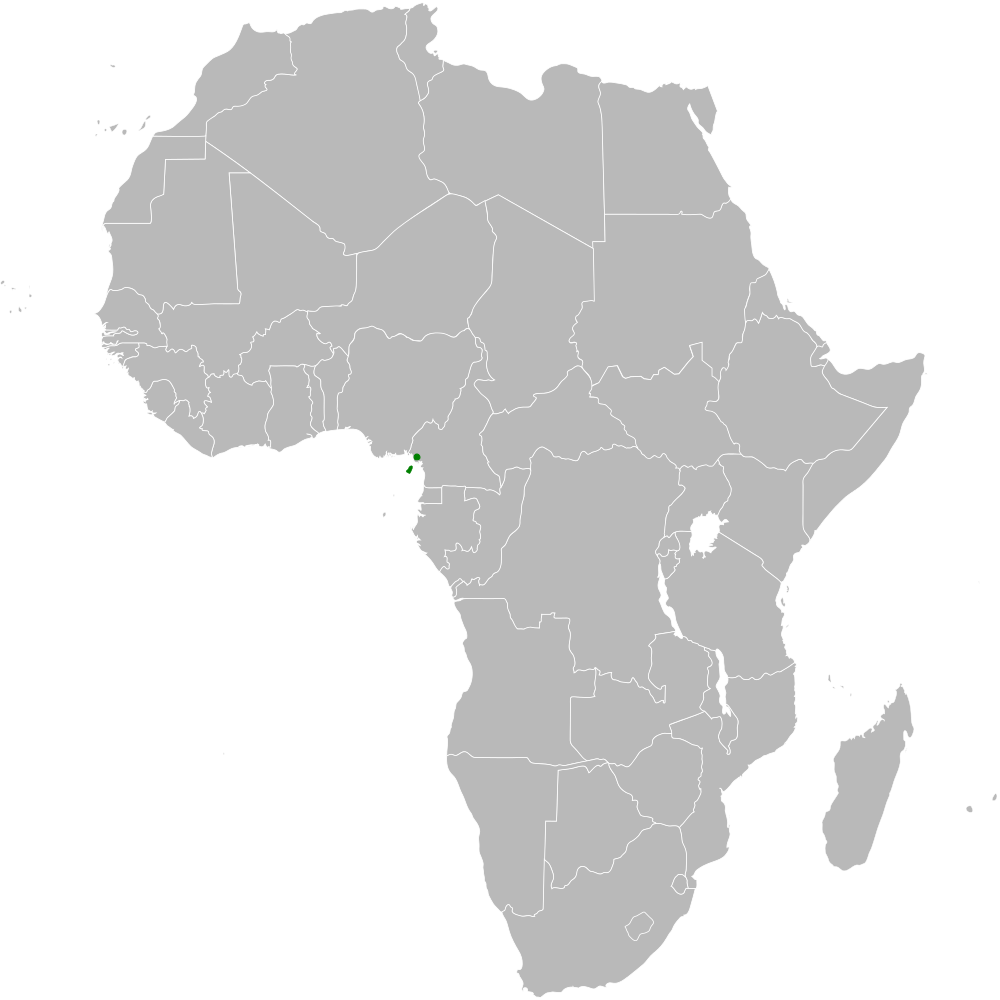

= Mountain saw-wing =

Species of bird

The mountain saw-wing (Psalidoprocne fuliginosa), also known as the mountain rough-winged swallow or the Cameroon Mountain rough-winged swallow, is a species of bird in the family Hirundinidae.

It is native to the Mount Cameroon and Bioko montane forests. While it has been reported elsewhere in Central Africa (namely, the Cameroon line of Cameroon and Nigeria), it has never been confirmed.
