= Upper Guinean forests =

Tropical moist forest region of West Africa

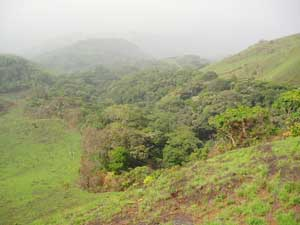

The Upper Guinean forests is a tropical seasonal forest region of West Africa. The Upper Guinean forests extend from Guinea and Sierra Leone in the west through Liberia, Côte d'Ivoire and Ghana to Togo in the east, and a few hundred kilometers inland from the Atlantic coast. A few enclaves of montane forest lie further inland in the mountains of central Guinea and central Togo and Benin.

In the drier interior, the Upper Guinean forests yield to the Guinean forest-savanna mosaic, a belt of dry forests and savannas that lies between the coastal forests and the savannas and grasslands of the Sudan further north. The Dahomey Gap, a region of Togo and Benin where the Guinean forest-savanna mosaic extends to the Atlantic coast, separates the Upper Guinean forests from the Lower Guinean forests to the east, which extend from eastern Benin through Nigeria and south along the coast of the Gulf of Guinea. The Upper Guinean forests are a Global 200 ecoregion.

The Guinean moist forests are much affected by winds from the hot dry area to the north and the cool Atlantic currents. This gives the region a very seasonal climate with over 80 in (203 cm) of rain falling in some areas in the wet season. Over 2000 species of vascular plant have been recorded in the ecoregion, and mammals found here include the chimpanzee (Pan troglodytes), leopard (Panthera pardus), pygmy hippopotamus (Hexaprotodon liberiensis), Ogilby's duiker (Cephalophus ogilbyi), Nimba otter shrew (Micropotamogale lamottei) and the African golden cat (Profelis aurata). There are twenty-one endemic/near-endemic and seasonal forest birds in the ecoregion; three avian species, the Nimba flycatcher (Melaenornis annamarulae), the Gola malimbe (Malimbus ballmanni) and the spot-winged greenbul (Phyllastrephus leucolepis) are further restricted in distribution to the western forests only.

The World Wide Fund for Nature (WWF) listed the Upper Guinean forests (which it calls the Guinean moist forests) on its Global 200 Critical Regions for Conservation.

The WWF divides the Upper Guinean forests into three ecoregions:

- The Western Guinean lowland forests, extending from Guinea and Sierra Leone through Liberia and southwestern Côte d'Ivoire, as far as the Sassandra River.
- The Eastern Guinean forests, extending east from the Sassandra River through Côte d'Ivoire and Ghana to western Togo, with a few isolated pockets further inland, in the highlands of central Togo and Benin.
- The Guinean montane forests are found at higher elevations in the Guinea Highlands, which extend through central and southeastern Guinea, northern Sierra Leone, and eastern Côte d'Ivoire.

== See also ==
- Guinean Forests of West Africa
- Phytochorion
