= Cross–Niger transition forests =

Ecoregion in Nigeria

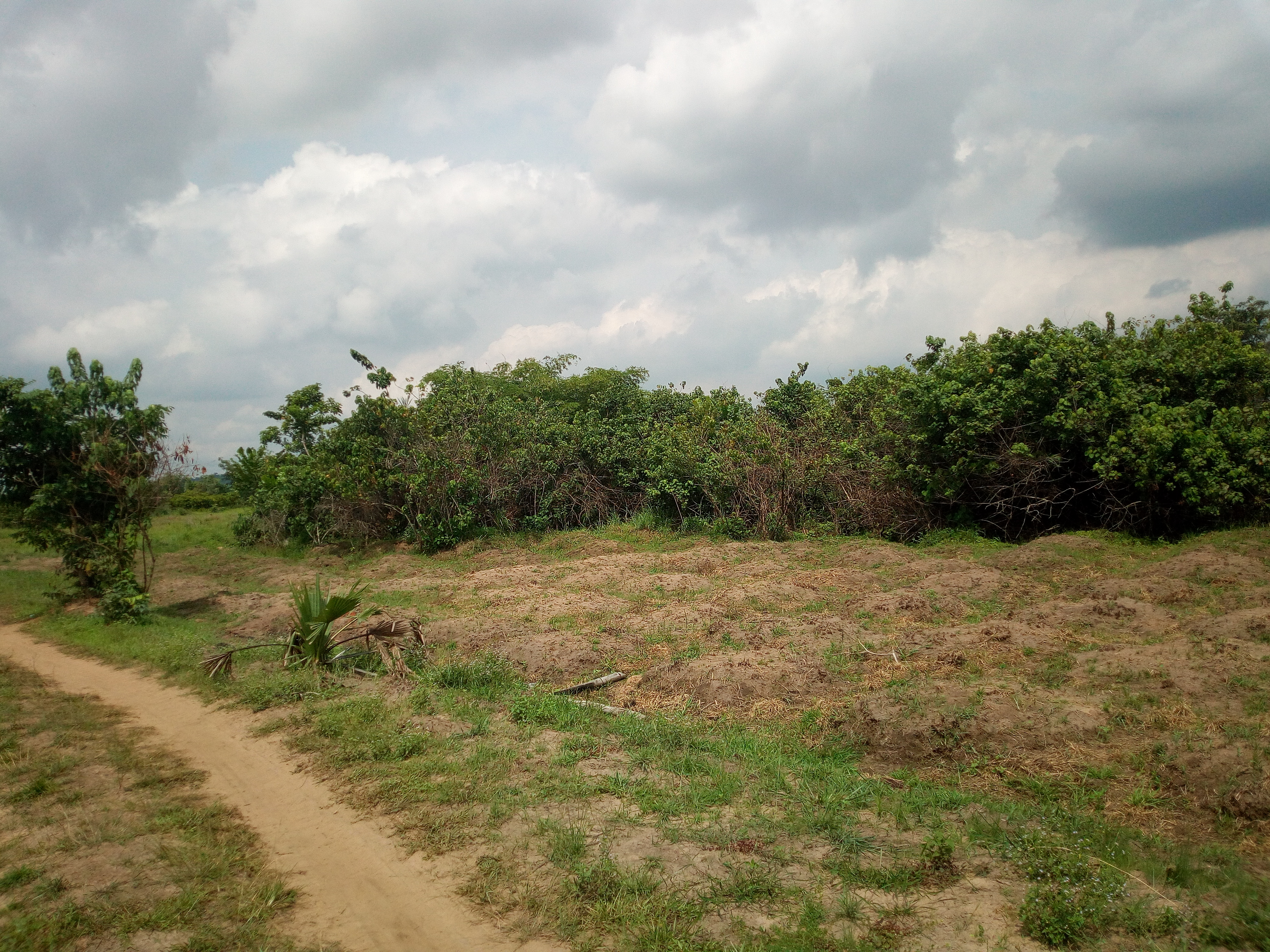
- Urum Natural Forest Reserve, Anambra State, Nigeria

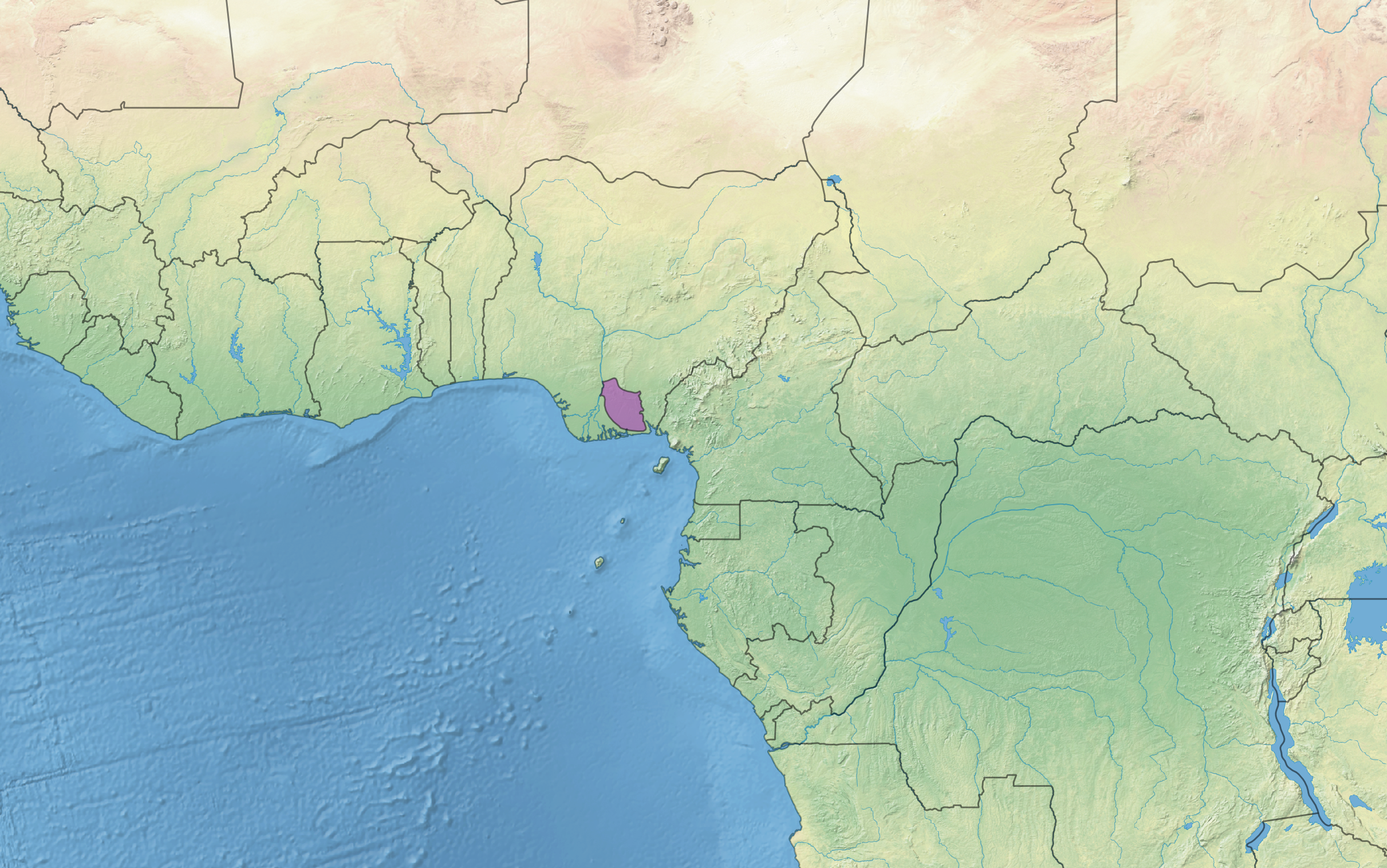
- Map of Cross-Niger Transition Forests Ecoregion

Ecology
- Realm: Afrotropical
- Biome: Tropical and subtropical moist broadleaf forests

Geography
- Area: 20,700 km^{2} (8,000 mi^{2})
- Country: Nigeria
- Coordinates: 5.5°N 7.4°E

Conservation
- Conservation status: critical

The Cross–Niger transition forests is a tropical moist broadleaf forest ecoregion of southeastern Nigeria, located between the Niger River on the west and the Cross River on the east. Once a rich mixture of tropical forest and savanna woodland covered these low, rolling hills but today, this is one of the most densely populated areas of Africa and today most of the forest has been removed and the area is now grassland.

== Location and description ==
The ecoregion known as the Cross Niger Transition Forests is situated between the biogeographic regions of the Niger River and the Cross River. Due to the high agricultural intensity in this ecoregion, the majority of the natural tree cover has been removed. The eco-region extends across the Nigerian states of Abia, Akwa Ibom, Anambra, Ebonyi, and Imo, covering an area of 20,700 square kilometers (8,000 sq mi). The Niger River separates the Cross–Niger transition forests from the Nigerian lowland forests to the west, which probably resembles most closely the original environment of the Cross–Niger eco-region. To the south and south-west lies the Niger Delta swamp forests. To the north, the Cross–Niger transition forests yield to the Guinean forest-savanna mosaic of the drier interior.

The climate is wet, becoming drier further inland, with a dry season from December to February.

== Flora ==
The native flora and fauna of the ecoregion is "transitional", blending elements from the Upper Guinean forests include Afzelia, which is cultivated for timber, and the Borassus aethiopum palm.

== Fauna ==
Small areas of protected forest do remain within the grassland and these are home to animals such as Sclater's guenon and crested chameleon (Trioceros cristatus). The Niger River has always been a substantial barrier to movement of wildlife in and out of the region. Large mammals have been depleted in the area since the 1940s and there is now so little wildlife remaining in the area that even bats and frogs are now trapped and eaten.

== Threats ==
The ecoregion has sustained a dense human population for centuries, and much of the original forest cover has been cleared for agriculture, forest plantations, and urban developments such as the oil refineries of Port Harcourt. The few remaining enclaves of native forest include the Stubbs Creek Forest Reserve in Akwa Ibom together with some enclaves of sacred forest, which are continually disappearing as village life is eroded, and patches of riverine forest. There are forest reserves in Anambra and elsewhere, but these are mostly for the purpose of cultivating timber rather than preserving the original environment.
