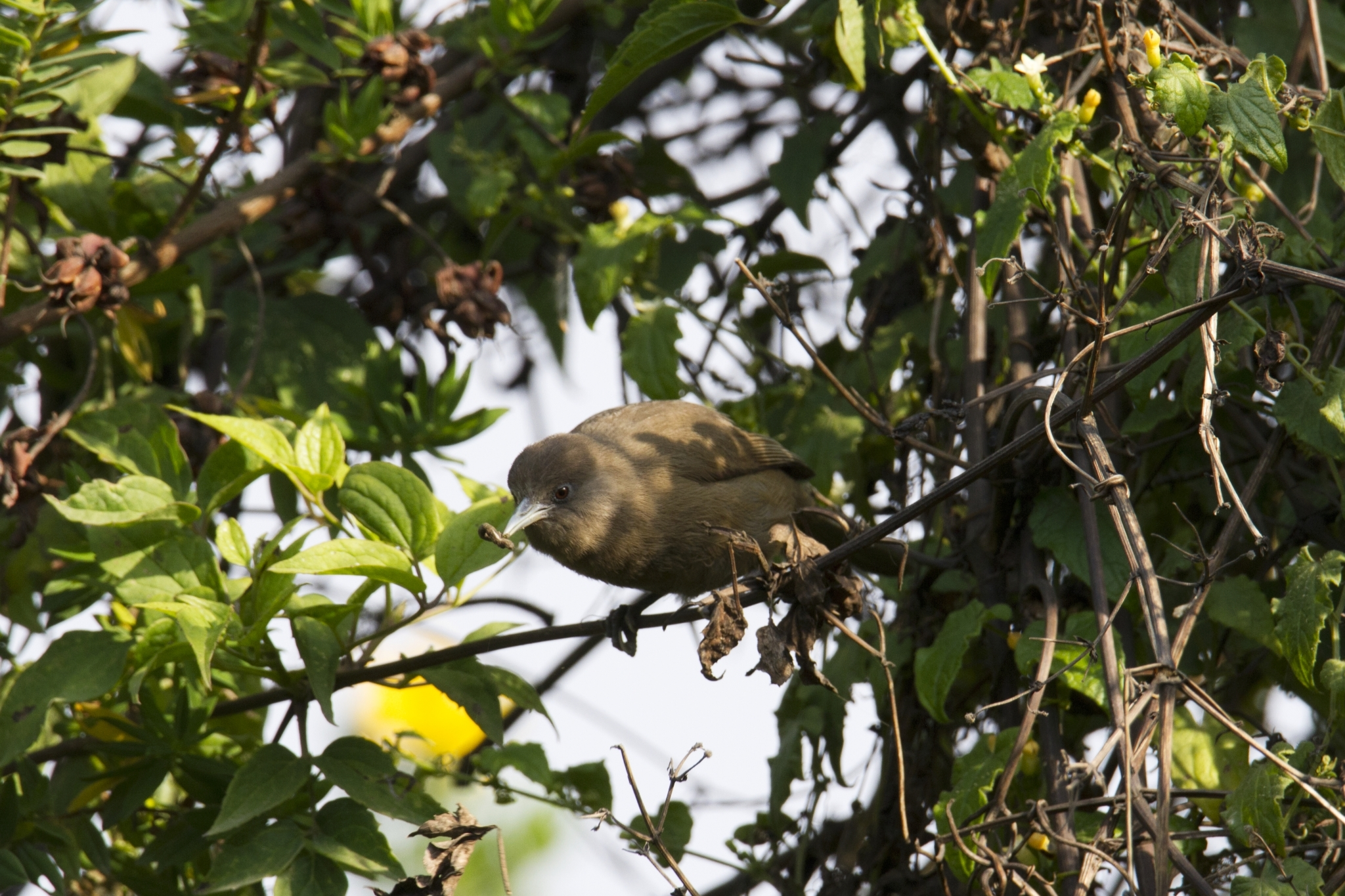

Conservation status
- Vulnerable (IUCN 3.1)

Scientific classification
- Kingdom: Animalia
- Phylum: Chordata
- Class: Aves
- Order: Passeriformes
- Family: Zosteropidae
- Genus: Zosterops
- Species: Z. brunneus

Binomial name
- Zosterops brunneus (Salvadori, 1903)

Synonyms
- Speirops brunneus

= Fernando Po speirops =

Species of bird

The Fernando Po speirops (Zosterops brunneus), also known as the Bioko speirops, is a species of bird in the family Zosteropidae. It is endemic to Bioko Island in Equatorial Guinea.

Its natural habitats are subtropical or tropical moist montane forests and subtropical or tropical high-altitude shrubland. The species is wholly restricted to the higher elevations of Pico Basilé. It is threatened by habitat loss and is considered vulnerable under the IUCN Red List of threatened species.

The bird is all brown in colour, with a darker brown upper part and paler lower part. The population size is estimated to fall between 10,000 and 19,999 individuals. The habitat of the bird is on the higher slopes (usually above 1900m in elevation), where it inhabits lichen forest and montane heathland. It usually associates in small groups of four or five and eats insects from trees and also takes fruit and seeds as a food source.
