= List of Liberian national forests =

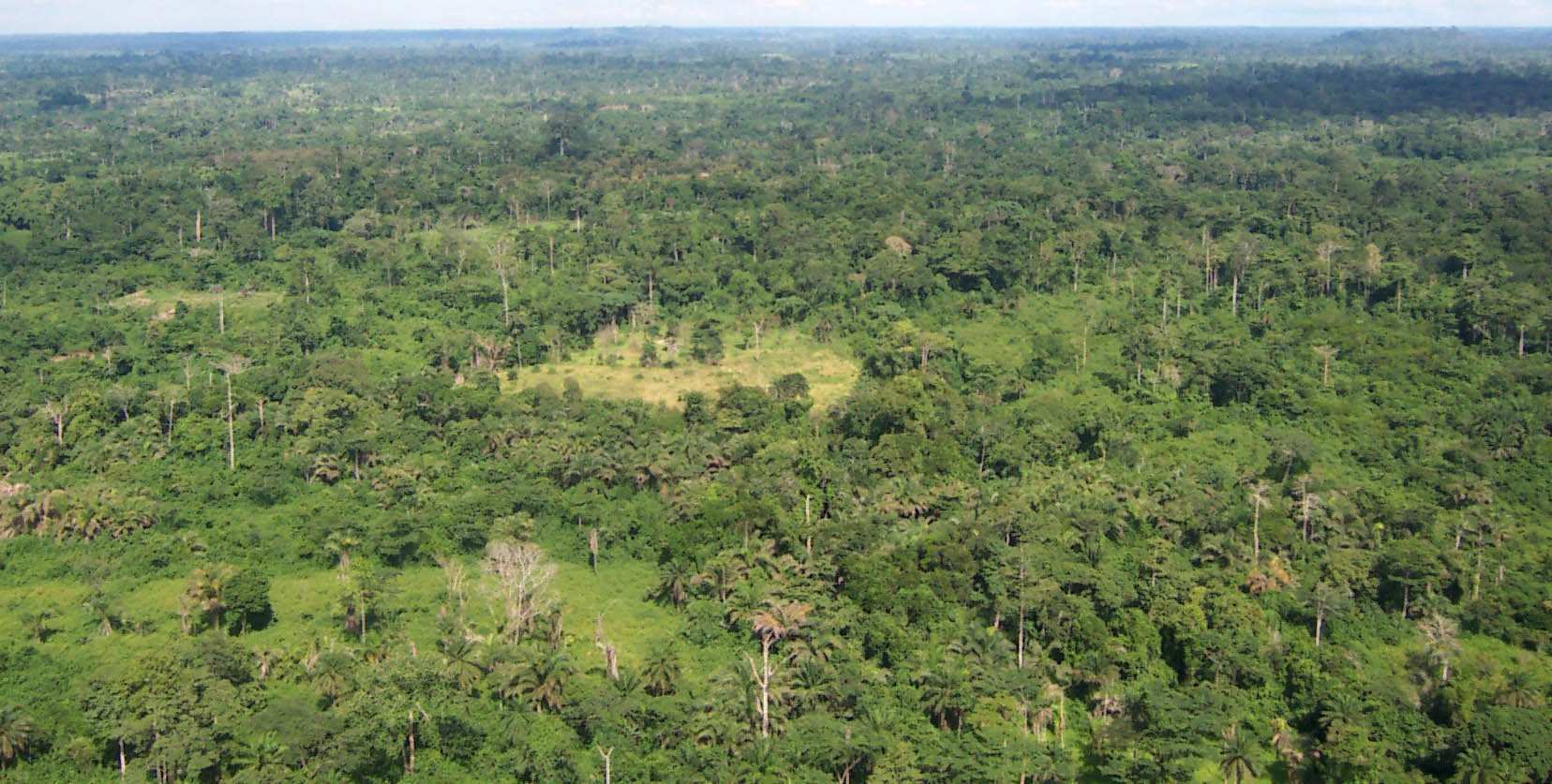
A Liberian tropical forest

This is a list of all the national forests in Liberia.

== Forests ==
Name	County	Established	Size
Belle National Forest	Gbarpolu County		609 square kilometres (235 sq mi)
Gbi National Forest	Nimba County	1960	607 square kilometres (234 sq mi)
Gio National Forest	Nimba County	1960	327 square kilometres (126 sq mi)
Gola National Forest	Gbarpolu County	1960	2,020 square kilometres (780 sq mi)
Grebo National Forest	River Gee County		2,806 square kilometres (1,083 sq mi)
Kpelle National Forest	Gbarpolu County	1961	1,748 square kilometres (675 sq mi)
Krahn-Bassa National Forest	Sinoe County		5,816 square kilometres (2,246 sq mi)
Lorma National Forest	Bong County		987 square kilometres (381 sq mi)
Nimba National Forest	Nimba County		187 square kilometres (72 sq mi)
North Loma National Forest	Lofa County		
Sapo National Forest	Sinoe County		

== See also ==
- Cape Mount Nature Conservation Unit
- Wonegizi Nature Conservation Unit
