= Geography of Liberia =

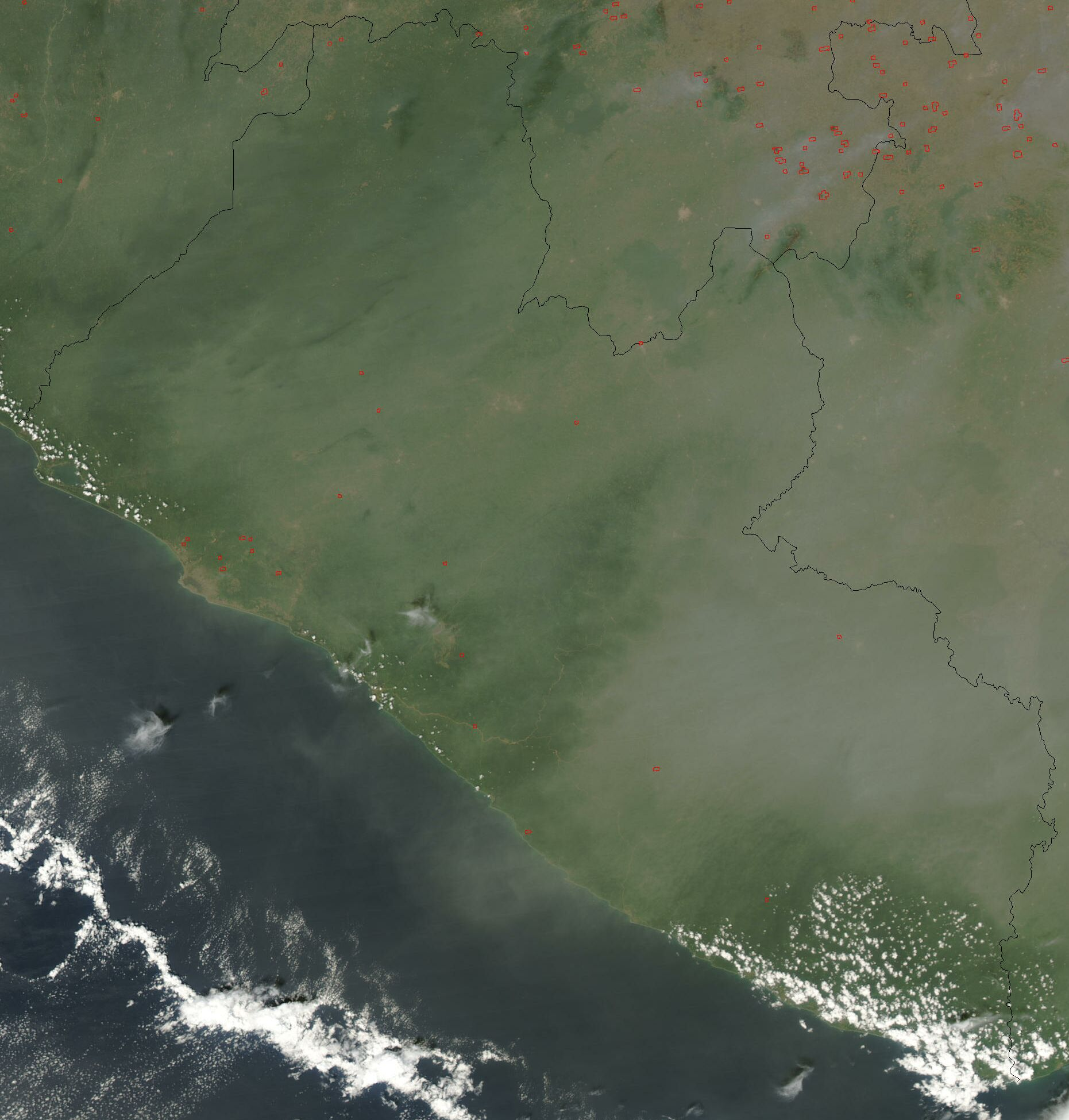
- Continent: Africa
- Region: West Africa
- Coordinates: 6°30′N 9°30′W
- Area: Ranked 102nd
  - Total: 111,369 km^{2} (43,000 sq mi)
  - Land: 86.49%
  - Water: 13.51%
- Coastline: 680 km (420 mi)
- Borders: 986 km (613 mi)
- Highest point: Wologizi Range; 1,440 meters (4,720 ft)
- Lowest point: Atlantic Ocean; 0 meters (0 ft)
- Longest river: Cavalla River; 515 km (320 mi)
- Largest lake: Lake Piso; 103 km^{2} (40 mi^{2})
- Exclusive economic zone: 249,734 km^{2} (96,423 mi^{2})

Topographic map of Liberia

Location of Liberia in western Africa

Köppen climate classification map of Liberia

Liberia is a sub-Saharan nation in West Africa located at 6 °N, 9 °W.

== Area and boundaries ==
Area
- total: 111,369 square kilometers (43,000 mi^{2})
  - country rank in the world: 102nd
- land: 96,300 square kilometers (37,190 mi^{2})
- water: 15,000 square kilometers (5,810 mi^{2})
Area — comparative
- Australia comparative: approximately 3/5 larger than Tasmania
- Canada comparative: approximately twice the size of Nova Scotia
- United Kingdom comparative: slightly more than 2/5 larger than Scotland
- United States comparative: slightly larger than Virginia
- EU comparative: approximately the size of Bulgaria
Land boundaries
- total: 987 kilometers (613 mi)
- border countries: Sierra Leone (298 kilometers (185 mi)), Guinea (591 kilometers (367 mi)), Ivory Coast (777 kilometers (483 mi))
Coastline
- Atlantic Ocean 580 kilometers (360 mi)

== Physical geography ==
Liberia extends from between 4.21°N and 8.34°N to 7.27°W and 11.31°W. It is roughly rectangular measuring about 510 km (317 mi) in length from northwest to southeast, with a width of about 275 km (171 mi). The coastline is about 680 km (423 mi), including river mouths and inlets up to one kilometre wide.

Drainage of the whole country is direct to the sea, with a series of short rivers flowing directly into the sea. These are, from west to east, the Mano River on the border with Sierra Leone, the Mafa River, the Lofa River, the Saint Paul River, the Mesurado River, the Farmington River, the Saint John River, the Timbo River, the Cestos River, the Sehnkwehn River, the Sinoe River, the Dugbe River, the Dubo River, the Grand Cess River and the Cavalla River on the border with Ivory Coast.

In the west, the coast is low and sandy, but in the central and eastern parts of the country it is sandy and rocky and of moderate relief, frequently broken by the mouths of the rivers. The coastal plain varies in width, being narrow between Monrovia and Buchanan, but being much wider in the west and in the Cestos Valley in the centre, narrowing again in the eastern end of the country.

Further inland the land rises, sometimes with escarpments, to a plateau some 300 to 400 m (1,000 to 1,300 ft) above sea level. This is divided by the river valleys and there are hilly ridges between some of the river valleys. The land rises further in the north and northwest of the country, with mountains that exceed 1,000 m (3,300 ft) in several places, the highest point in the country being in the Wologizi Range at 1,440 m (4,724 ft).

=== Extreme points ===
This is a list of the extreme points of Liberia, the points that are farther north, south, east or west than any other location.

- Northernmost point – unnamed location on the border with Guinea in the Sodia river immediately north of the town of Voinjama, Lofa County.
- Easternmost point – unnamed headland at the confluence of the Cavally river and the Hana river, River Gee County.
- Southernmost point – Kablaké headland, Maryland County.
- Westernmost point - unnamed headland immediately west of the town of Sewulu at the mouth of the Mano River, Grand Cape Mount County.

== Borders and maritime claims ==
The total length of Liberia's land borders is 1,587 kilometers (986 mi): 310 kilometers (190 mi) with Sierra Leone on the northwest, 560 kilometers (350 mi) with Guinea to the north, and 716 kilometers (445 mi) with Ivory Coast. Liberia claims an Exclusive Economic Zone of 249,734 km^{2} (96,423 mi^{2}) and 200 nmi (370 km; 230 mi).

== Terrain ==
Liberia has a mostly hilly terrain, it also has rolling plains along the coast to a rolling plateau and low mountains in the northeast.

=== Elevation extremes ===
The lowest point in Liberia is at sea level on the Atlantic Ocean. The highest point in Liberia is 1,440 metres or 4,724 feet above sea level at Mount Wuteve.

== Natural resources ==
Natural resources that are found in Liberia include iron ore, timber, diamonds, gold and hydropower.

=== Mining ===
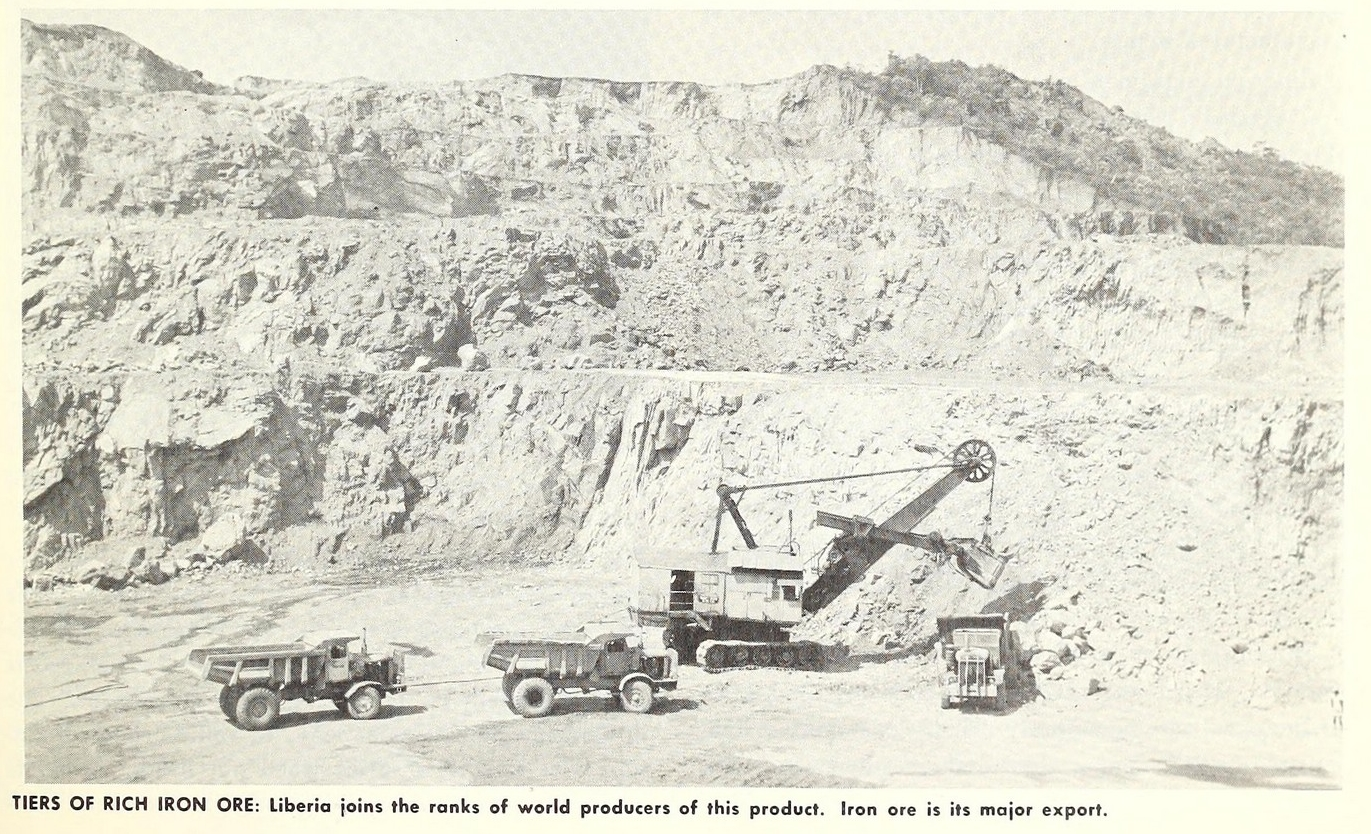
Iron ore mining

The mining industry of Liberia has witnessed a revival after the civil war which ended in 2003. Gold, diamonds, and iron ore form the core minerals of the mining sector with a new Mineral Development Policy and Mining Code being put in place to attract foreign investments. In 2013, the mineral sector accounted for 11% of GDP in the country and the World Bank projected a further increase in the sector by 2017.

Mining sector is considered the prime mover for the economic growth of the country and its exploitation has to be appropriately balanced with sustainable environmental preservation of its rich biodiversity. Apart from iron ore extractions, cement, diamond, gold, and petroleum resources have also been given due importance to enrich the economy of the country.

== Land use and agriculture ==
arable land: 5.2%
permanent crops: 2.1%
permanent pastures: 20.8%
forest: 44.6%
other: 27.3% (2011)

=== Irrigated land ===
30 square kilometres of Liberia's land was irrigated as of 2012.

=== Natural hazards ===
The natural hazard that occurs in Liberia is a dust-laden harmattan wind that blows from the Sahara (December to March).

== Environmental issues ==
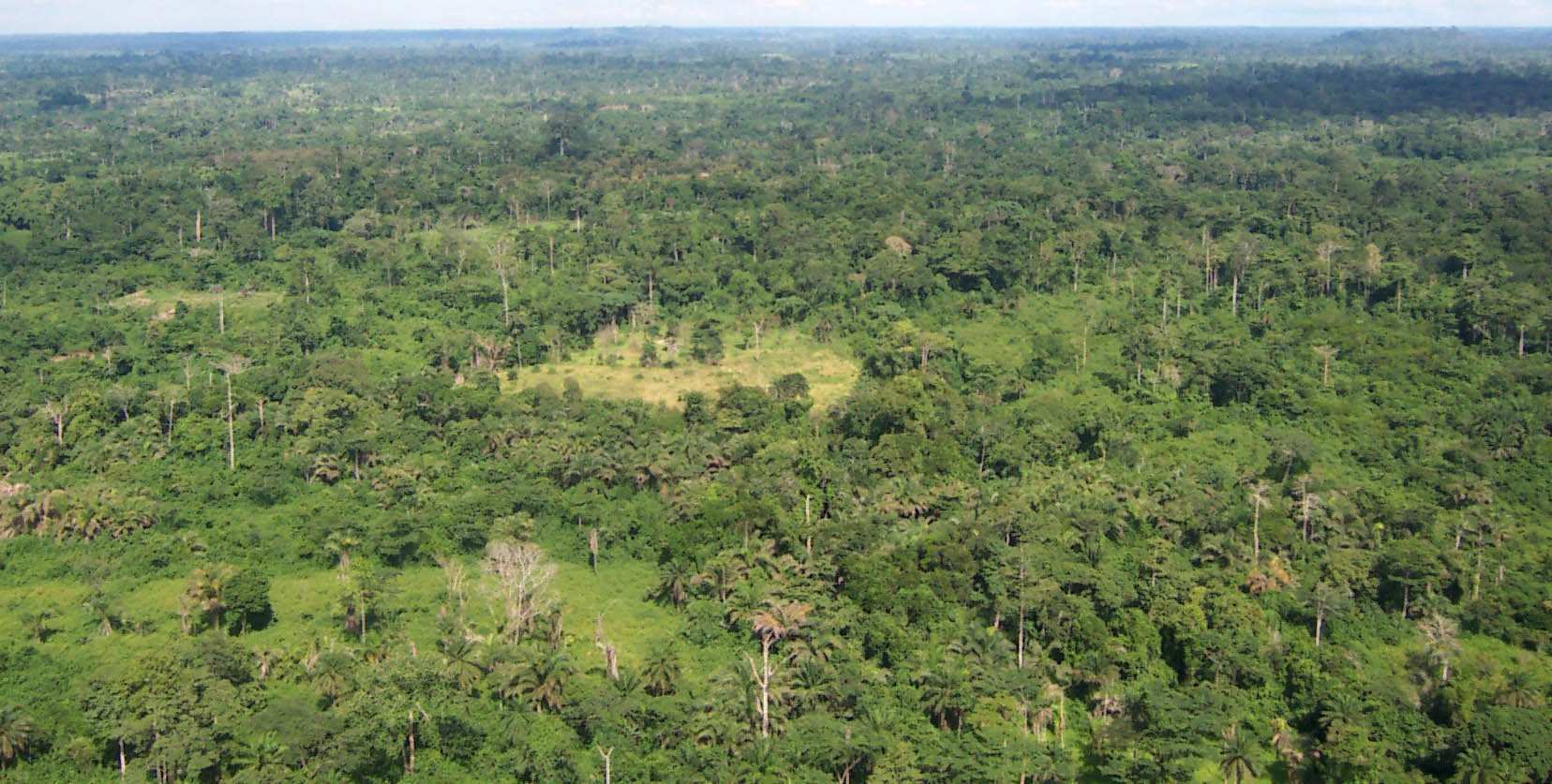
A Liberian tropical forest.

Environmental issues in Liberia include the deforestation of tropical rainforest, the hunting of endangered species for bushmeat, the pollution of rivers and coastal waters from industrial run-off and raw sewage, and the burning and dumping of household waste.

Like other countries in Africa, Liberia is also especially vulnerable to climate change, exacerbating existing environmental issues.

=== Climate change ===
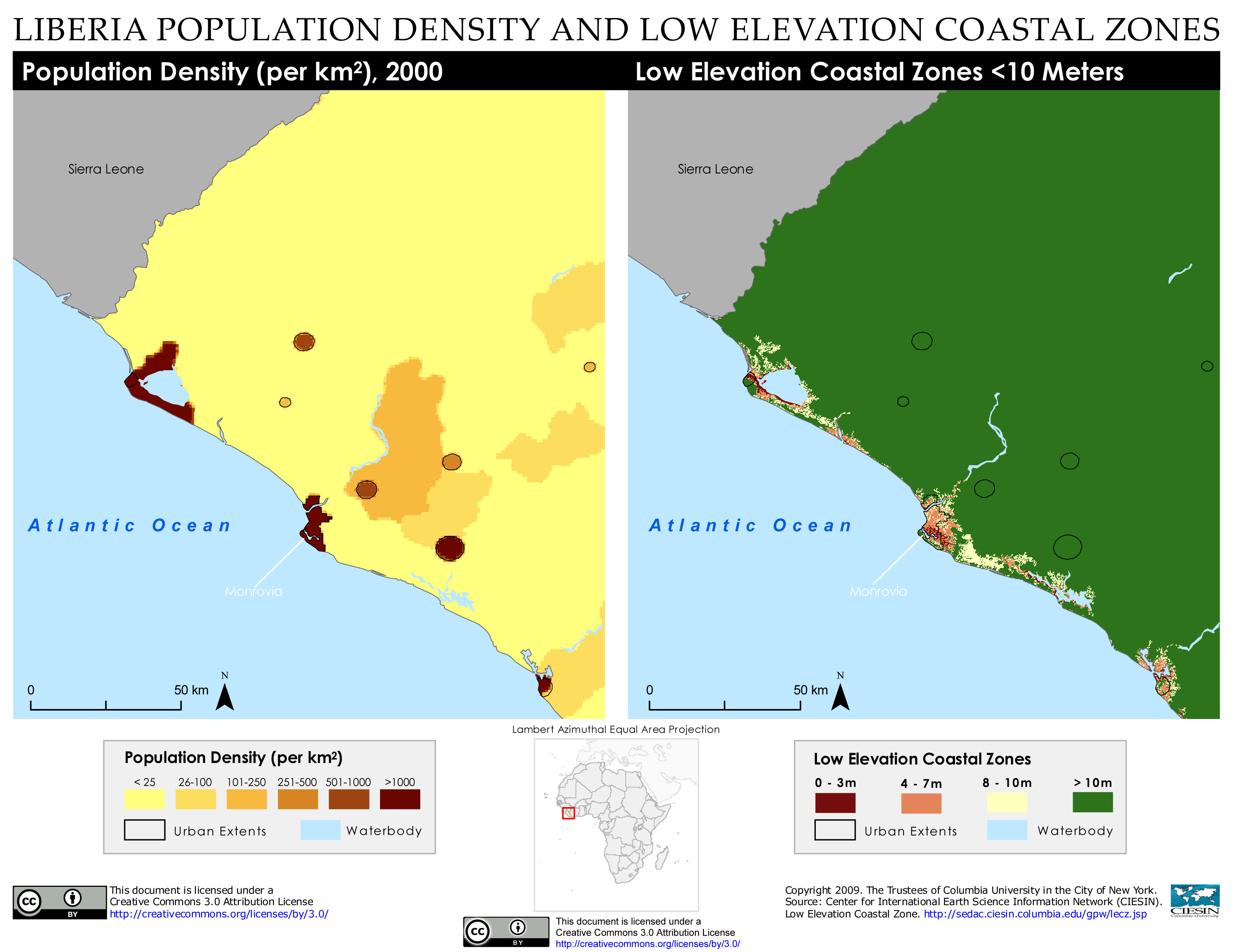
Population density and low elevation coastal zones. Monrovia is especially vulnerable to sea level rise.

Climate change in Liberia causes many problems as Liberia is particularly vulnerable to climate change. Like many other countries in Africa, Liberia both faces existing environmental issues, as well as sustainable development challenges. Because of its location in Africa, it is vulnerable to extreme weather, the coastal effects of sea level rise, and changing water systems and water availability. Climate change is expected to severely impact the economy of Liberia, especially agriculture, fisheries, and forestry. Liberia has been an active participant in international and local policy changes related to climate change.

In March 2024, the World Bank released the Liberia Country and Climate Development Report (CCDR), which highlights the severe threat posed by global climate change to Liberia's stability and economic growth. The report outlines the country's vulnerabilities, including its reliance on natural resources, limited fiscal space, and inadequate infrastructure. It warns that without proactive intervention, climate change could shrink Liberia's economy by 15% and push an additional 1.3 million people into poverty by 2050. Conversely, the report suggests that targeted adaptation efforts could significantly improve resilience for up to 800,000 individuals. The CCDR details a strategy for climate action, focusing on four main themes: climate risks and readiness, essential infrastructure, human development, and sustainable land management. It also calls for improved access to finance, leveraging both concessional funding and private sector investment, to support Liberia's pursuit of inclusive growth and poverty reduction.

== See also ==
- Administrative divisions of Liberia
- List of cities in Liberia
- List of rivers of Liberia
- List of Liberian national forests
