= Gbarpolu-1 =

Electoral district in Liberia

- Constituency for the House of Representatives of Liberia
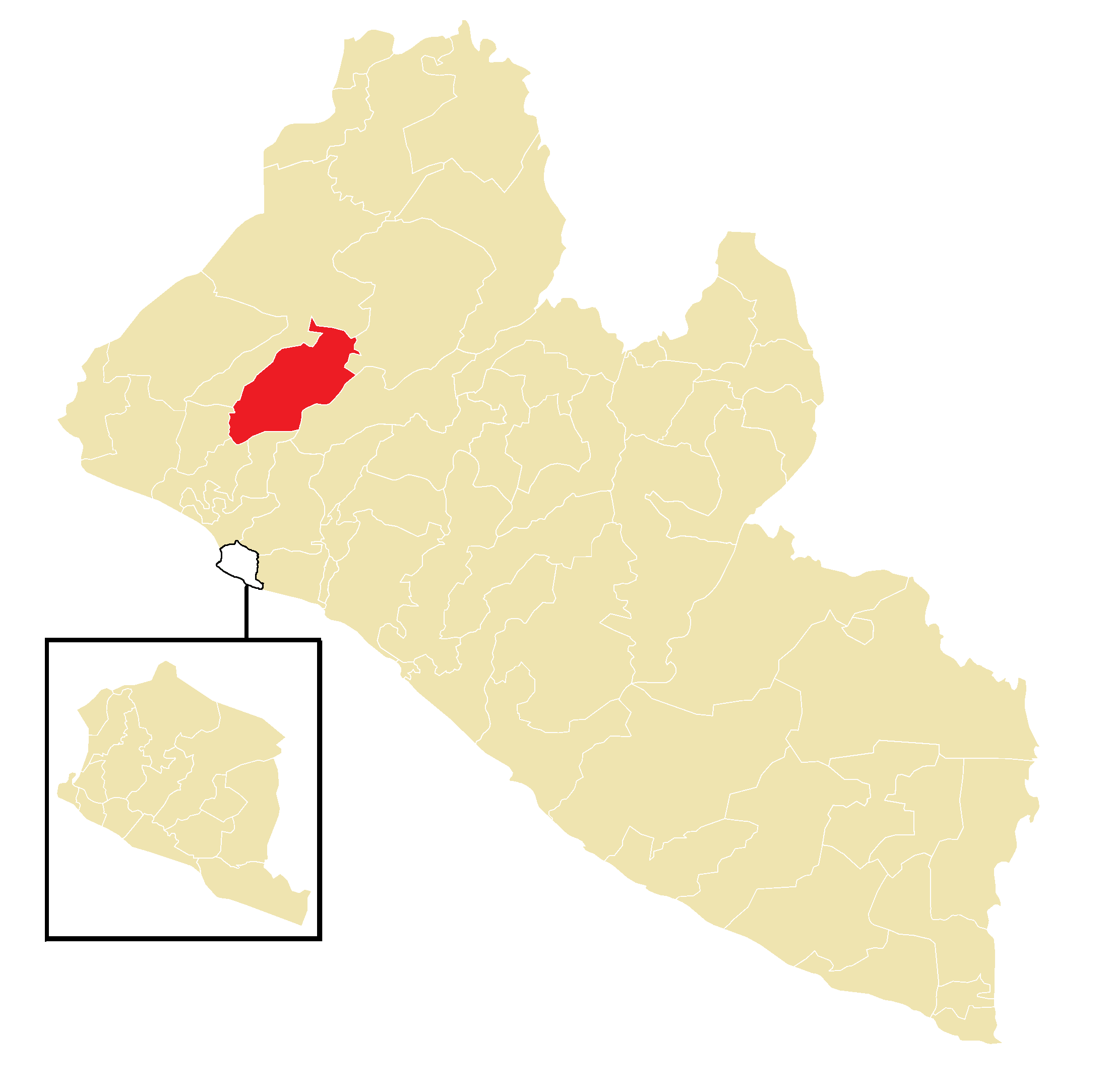
- Electorate: 16,869 (2023)

Current constituency
- Created: 2011
- Representative: Zinnah A. Norman

Gbarpolu-1 is an electoral district for the elections to the House of Representatives of Liberia. The constituency covers Bopolu city, Bopolu District (except Gbelleta community) and two communities of Bokomu District (Nyeamah and Gbarngay).

== Elected representatives ==
Year	Representative elected	Party	Notes
2005	Gbondojever S. Quiah	NRP	
2011	Alfred Koiwood	CDC	
2017	Alfred Koiwood	CDC	
2023	Zinnah A. Norman	CDC	

== Election results ==
2005 Gbarpolu County's 1st House District Election
Candidate	Party	Votes	%
Gbondojever S. Quiah	National Reformation Party	1,373	32.55
Gertrude Tene Lamin	Unity Party	1,153	27.34
J. Varney Okai	Coalition for the Transformation of Liberia	743	17.61
Samuel V. G. Goba Jr.	Congress for Democratic Change	386	9.15
David Nelson Morley	National Democratic Party of Liberia	364	8.63
Joseph Momo Mathews Sr.	New Deal Movement	107	2.54
Hiliary Alpha Womowood	Liberty Party	92	2.18
Total		4,218	100.00
Valid votes		4,218	96.28
Invalid/blank votes		163	3.72
Total votes		4,381	100.00

2011 Gbarpolu County's 1st House District Election
Candidate	Party	Votes	%
Alfred Koiwood	Congress for Democratic Change	2,274	28.06
Armah Morphor Sarnor	Unity Party	1,671	20.62
Isaac Massamai Varmah	Liberty Party	997	12.30
Jestina V. Dukuly	National Democratic Coalition	981	12.11
Miatta S. Tarnue	National Democratic Party of Liberia	814	10.04
Ernest Zingbae Coleman	National Reformation Party	464	5.73
James Gbarngo Dogba-Yassah	Liberia Transformation Party	373	4.60
Eddington Ahmadou Varmah	Movement for Progressive Change	310	3.83
Norris G. David Sr.	Liberia Empowerment Party	220	2.71
Total		8,104	100.00
Valid votes		8,104	92.78
Invalid/blank votes		631	7.22
Total votes		8,735	100.00

2017 Gbarpolu County's 1st House District Election
Candidate	Party	Votes	%
Alfred Koiwood (Incumbent)	Coalition for Democratic Change	4,073	39.01
Olu Sonkoe Nangbah	Movement for Economic Empowerment	2,575	24.66
Bornor M. Varmah	Unity Party	1,386	13.28
Edrick Fargbanah Noah	Liberty Party	841	8.06
Darkollie Sylvester Jallah	Coalition for Liberia's Progress	544	5.21
David K. Zinnah	Liberia Transformation Party	278	2.66
Miatta S. Tarnue	Alternative National Congress	255	2.44
Ernest Z. Coleman	Grassroot Democratic Party of Liberia	252	2.41
Elizabeth K. Kei	Movement for Democracy and Reconstruction	186	1.78
Frances K. Smith	United People's Party	50	0.48
Total		10,440	100.00
Valid votes		10,440	95.06
Invalid/blank votes		543	4.94
Total votes		10,983	100.00
