= Gbarpolu-3 =

Electoral district in Liberia

- Constituency for the House of Representatives of Liberia
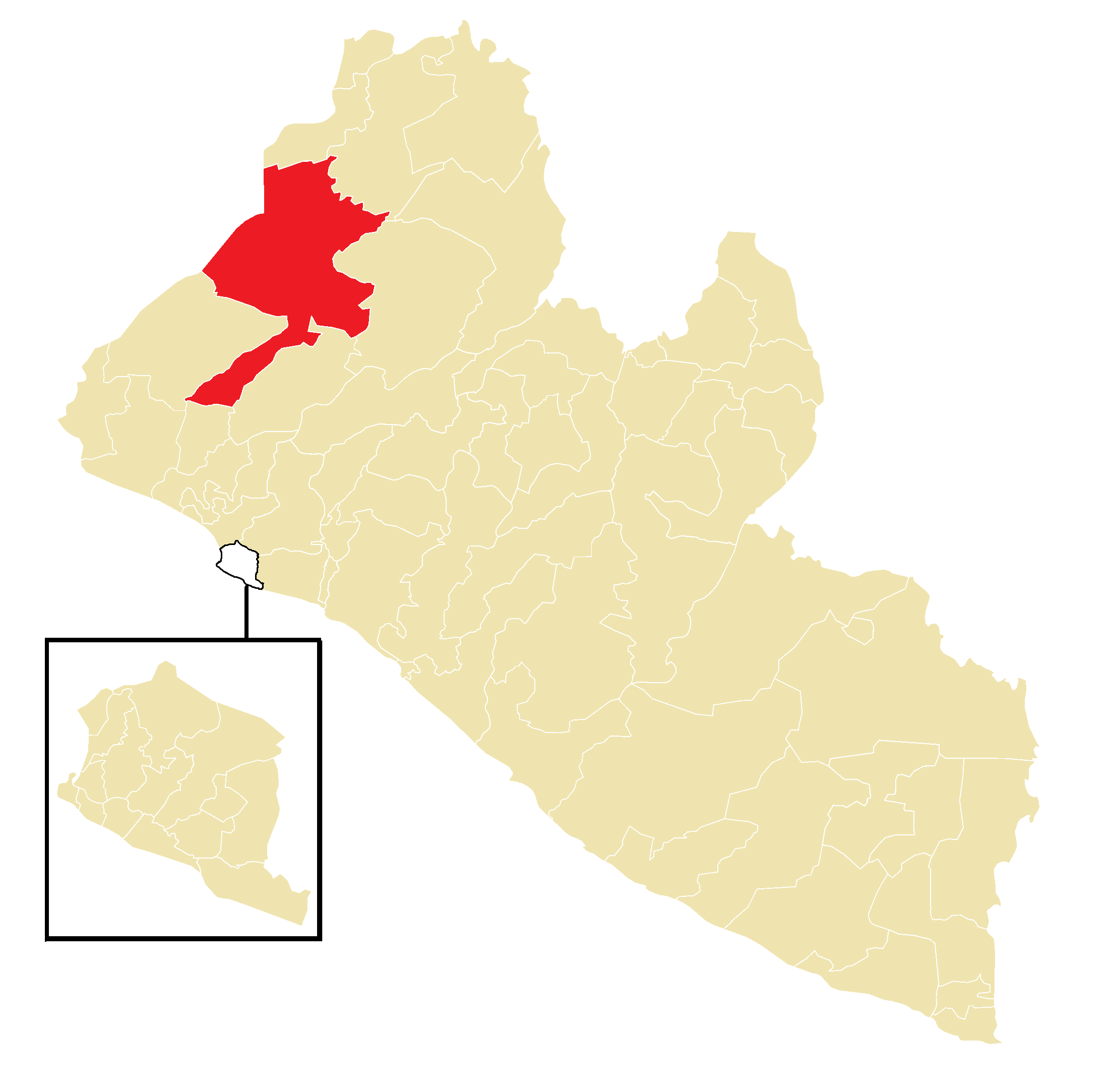
- Electorate: 14,758 (2023)

Current constituency
- Created: 2011
- Representative: Mustapha Waritay

Gbarpolu-3 is an electoral district for the elections to the House of Representatives of Liberia. The constituency covers Kongba District, Gbarma District as well as the Gbelleta community of Bopolu District.

== Elected representatives ==
Year	Representative elected	Party	Notes
2005	Dickson Temo Yarsiah, Sr.	UP	
2011	Gertrude T. Lamin	UP	
2017	Joseph M. Matthew, Jr.	Ind.	
2023	Mustapha Waritay	UP	

== Election results ==
2005 Gbarpolu County's 3rd House District Election
Candidate	Party	Votes	%
Dickson Temo Yarsiah Sr.	Unity Party	2,668	44.43
Roland Flomo Komah	National Democratic Party of Liberia	1,584	26.38
Gibson L. M. Tarniah Sr.	Independent	889	14.80
John Gwalar Gormor Sr.	National Patriotic Party	469	7.81
Joseph Z. Freeman	Coalition for the Transformation of Liberia	265	4.41
Korlue Gbelee	Liberty Party	130	2.16
Total		6,005	100.00
Valid votes		6,005	97.12
Invalid/blank votes		178	2.88
Total votes		6,183	100.00

2011 Gbarpolu County's 3rd House District Election
Candidate	Party	Votes	%
Gertrude T. Lamin	Unity Party	1,492	19.76
George Blama Kollie	Congress for Democratic Change	1,409	18.66
Jaa-Tuma Kowah Arman	Liberty Party	1,038	13.75
Philip Blamah Lawson Sr.	National Democratic Party of Liberia	861	11.40
Gbondojever Stephen Quiah	Union of Liberian Democrats	833	11.03
Buster Mulbah Cooper	Liberia Transformation Party	541	7.16
Desmond A. T. Boima	Victory for Change Party	480	6.36
Varney Dabojah Taylor Sr.	National Democratic Coalition	451	5.97
Jacob Bai Komah Jr.	National Patriotic Party	446	5.91
Total		7,551	100.00
Valid votes		7,551	93.45
Invalid/blank votes		529	6.55
Total votes		8,080	100.00

2017 Gbarpolu County's 3rd House District Election
Candidate	Party	Votes	%
Joseph M. Matthew Jr.	Independent	3,808	33.44
Botoe Kanneh	Independent	3,287	28.87
Mustapha Waritay	Alternative National Congress	2,522	22.15
Gertrude T. Lamin (Incumbent)	Unity Party	1,315	11.55
Thomas Andrew Fahn	All Liberian Party	148	1.30
Richard A. Nimmo	Movement for Democracy and Reconstruction	113	0.99
Mohammed Ayouba Swaray	Coalition for Democratic Change	101	0.89
Gbondojever S. Quiah	Liberia Restoration Party	93	0.82
Total		11,387	100.00
Valid votes		11,387	95.21
Invalid/blank votes		573	4.79
Total votes		11,960	100.00
