= Environmental issues in Liberia =

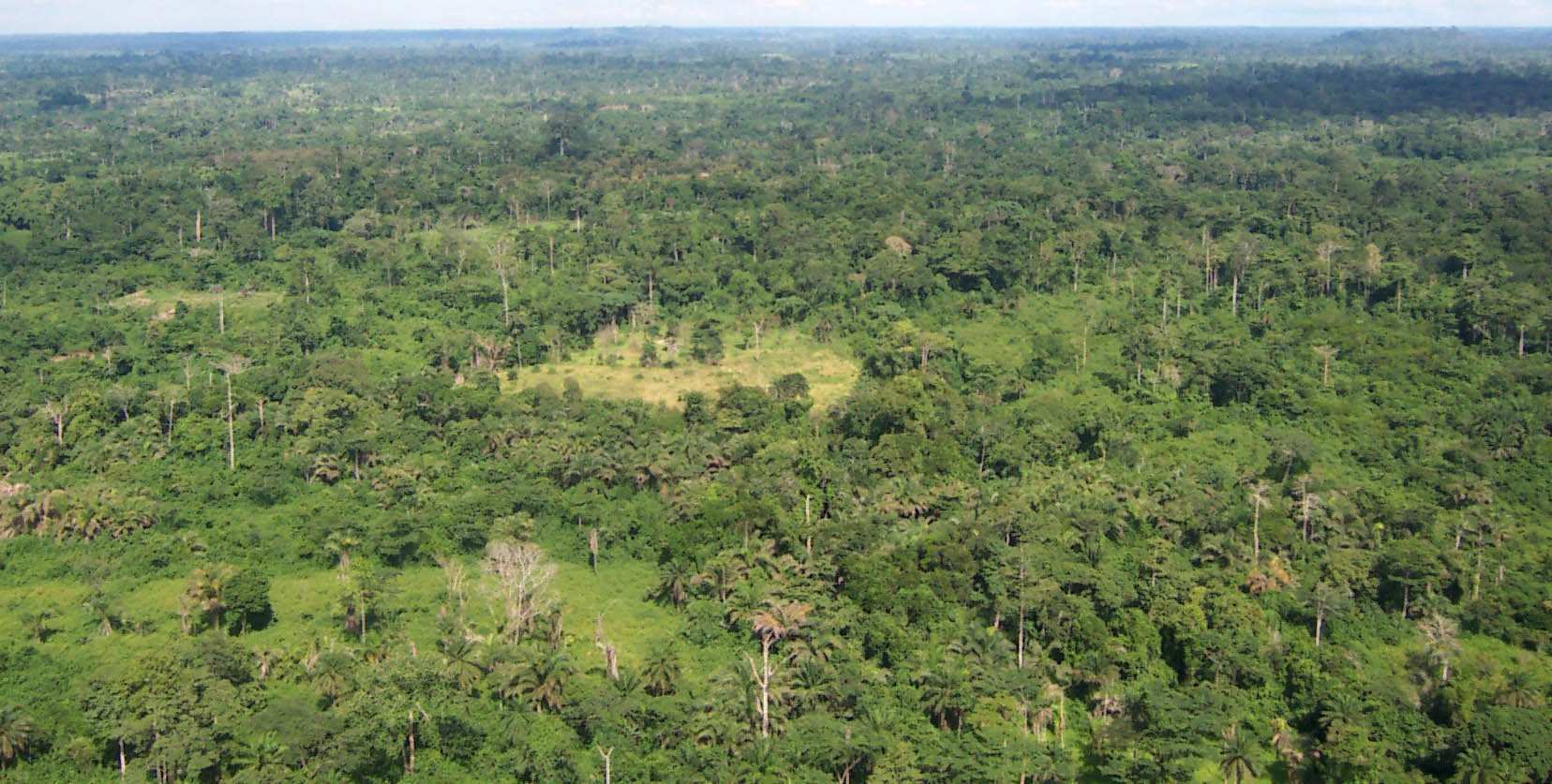
A Liberian tropical forest.

Environmental issues in Liberia include the deforestation of tropical rainforest, the hunting of endangered species for bushmeat, the pollution of rivers and coastal waters from industrial run-off and raw sewage, and the burning and dumping of household waste.

Like other countries in Africa, Liberia is also especially vulnerable to climate change, exacerbating existing environmental issues.

== Poaching of endangered species for consumption as bushmeat ==
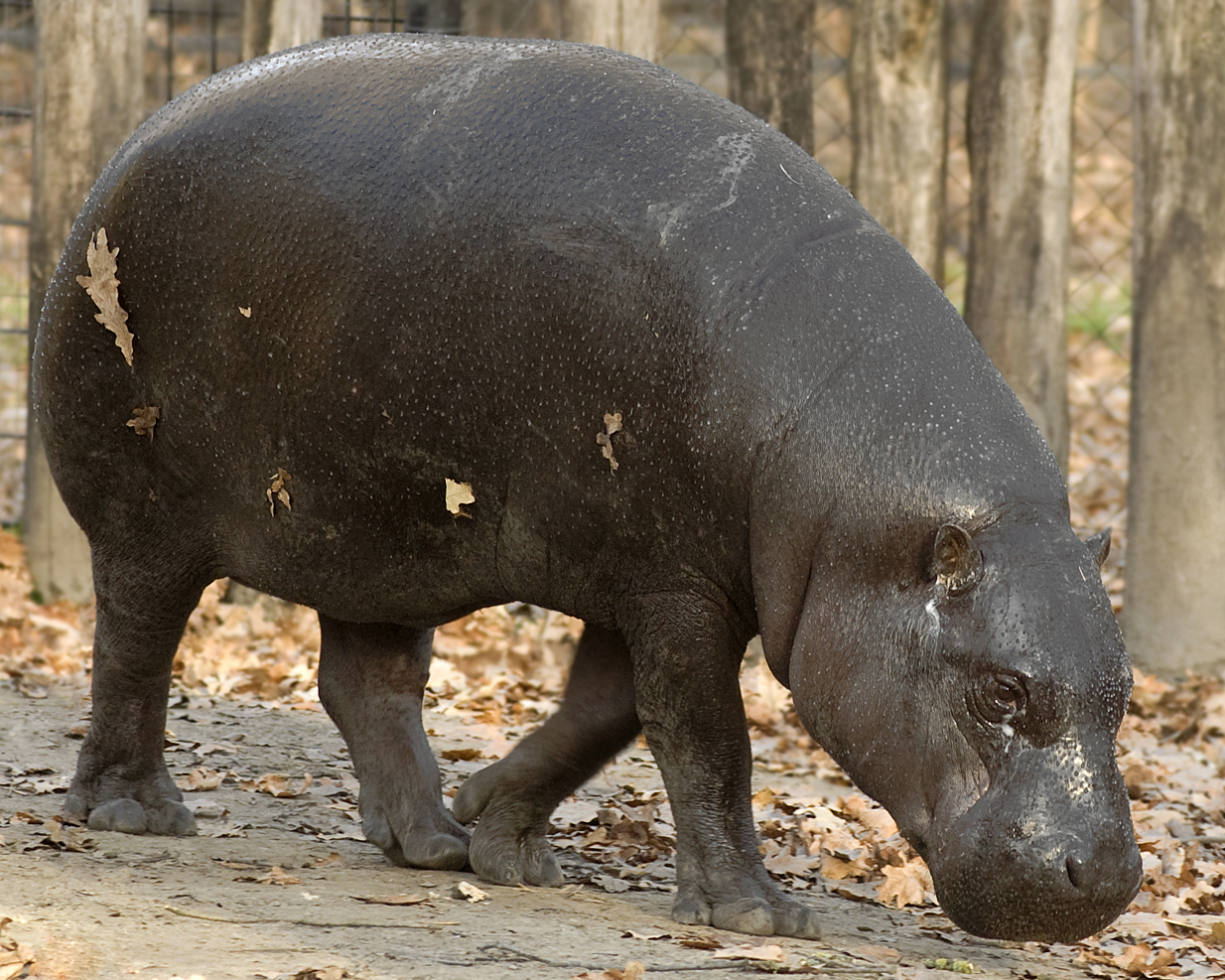
Pygmy hippos are among the species illegally hunted for food in Liberia. The World Conservation Union estimates that there are fewer than 3,000 pygmy hippos remaining in the wild.

Endangered species are hunted for human consumption as bushmeat in Liberia. Species hunted for food in Liberia include elephants, pygmy hippopotamus, chimpanzees, leopards, duikers, and monkeys. Forest rangers in Liberia say that bushmeat poachers will kill any forest animal they encounter.

Bushmeat is widely eaten in Liberia, and is considered a delicacy. A 2004 public opinion survey found that bushmeat ranked second behind fish amongst residents of the capital Monrovia as a preferred source of protein. Of households where bushmeat was served, 80% of residents said they cooked it "once in a while," while 13% cooked it once a week and 7% cooked bushmeat daily. The survey was conducted during the last civil war, and bushmeat consumption is now believed to be far higher.

Poachers hunt protected species inside Liberia's national parks, including the Sapo and Gola rainforest parks. The poachers mostly hunt using snares and wire traps. The head of conservation at the Liberian government Forest Development Authority said when interviewed that a single hunter may set between 200 and 300 traps and not return to them for two to three weeks - leaving the caught animals to a prolonged death. Bushmeat is often exported to neighboring Sierra Leone and Ivory Coast, despite a ban on the cross-border sale of wild animals.

It is illegal to kill protected species like chimpanzees and elephants in Liberia. However, forest rangers are not allowed to carry guns, and are understaffed. Prosecution of poachers is also hampered by weak anti-poaching legislation.

== Deforestation ==
Liberia is a global biodiversity hotspot - a significant reservoir of biodiversity that is under threat from humans. Liberia contains a significant portion of West Africa's remaining rainforest, with about 43% of the Upper Guinean forest - an important forest that spans several West African nations.

Slash-and-burn agriculture is one of the human activities eroding Liberia's natural forests. A 2004 UN report estimated that between 1990 and 2004, forest cover in Liberia had fallen by around seven percent to just over 31 per cent of Liberia's total area.

Illegal logging has increased in Liberia since the end of the Second Civil War in 2003. In 2012 President Ellen Johnson Sirleaf granted licenses to companies to cut down 58% of all the primary rainforest left in Liberia. After international protests, many of those logging permits were cancelled.

Liberia and Norway struck an agreement in September 2014 whereby Liberia ceases all logging in exchange for $150 million in development aid. Liberia agreed to place 30% or more of its forests under protected area status by 2020. It will also pilot direct payments to communities for protecting the forest. Norway will seek independent verification that trees remain standing before payments are made. However, subsequent reports by environmental and watchdog groups suggest that this program may have accelerated some elements of deforestation.

In 2004, a United Nations Environment Program report estimated that 99 per cent of Liberians burnt charcoal and fuel wood for cooking and heating, resulting in deforestation. The report found that Liberia was beginning to export charcoal in the region. Coastal mangrove swamps were also being burnt for fuel, removing nursery grounds for fish and the mangroves role as a natural flood defence.

Liberia had a 2018 Forest Landscape Integrity Index mean score of 4.79/10, ranking it 116th globally out of 172 countries.

=== Tree cover extent and loss ===
Global Forest Watch publishes annual estimates of tree cover loss and 2000 tree cover extent derived from time-series analysis of Landsat satellite imagery in the Global Forest Change dataset. In this framework, tree cover refers to vegetation taller than 5 m (including natural forests and tree plantations), and tree cover loss is defined as the complete removal of tree cover canopy for a given year, regardless of cause.

For Liberia, country statistics report cumulative tree cover loss of 2,522,056 ha (25,220.56 km^{2}) from 2001 to 2024 (about 26.9% of its 2000 tree cover area). For tree cover density greater than 30%, country statistics report a 2000 tree cover extent of 9,384,718 ha (93,847.18 km^{2}). The charts and table below display this data. In simple terms, the annual loss number is the area where tree cover disappeared in that year, and the extent number shows what remains of the 2000 tree cover baseline after subtracting cumulative loss. Forest regrowth is not included in the dataset.

Annual tree cover loss in Liberia, 2001–2024. View chart definition.
Tree cover extent in 2000 minus cumulative tree cover loss in Liberia, 2001–2024 (loss-only residual; does not account for gain). View chart definition.

Annual tree cover extent and loss
Year	Tree cover extent (km2) (Note: This residual measure does not include forest regrowth.)	Annual tree cover loss (km2)
2001	93,555.33	291.85
2002	92,985.48	569.85
2003	92,769.44	216.04
2004	92,707.10	62.34
2005	92,593.87	113.23
2006	92,231.66	362.21
2007	91,788.84	442.82
2008	91,427.12	361.72
2009	90,675.76	751.36
2010	90,472.18	203.58
2011	90,127.74	344.44
2012	89,406.60	721.14
2013	87,851.24	1,555.36
2014	86,210.75	1,640.49
2015	84,350.66	1,860.09
2016	82,664.81	1,685.85
2017	80,631.88	2,032.93
2018	78,582.56	2,049.32
2019	76,864.89	1,717.67
2020	74,663.67	2,201.22
2021	73,365.29	1,298.38
2022	71,844.25	1,521.04
2023	70,291.62	1,552.63
2024	68,626.62	1,665.00

=== REDD+ reference levels and monitoring ===
Under the UNFCCC REDD+ framework, Liberia has submitted both subnational and national reference-level benchmarks. On the UNFCCC REDD+ Web Platform, the 2020 submission for two priority landscapes in the north-west and south-east of the country is listed as having an assessed forest reference emission level (FREL), together with a reported national strategy and safeguards information, while the national forest monitoring system is listed as "not reported". A second, national submission made in 2026 is listed as under technical assessment, with the other Warsaw Framework elements marked as "not reported".

The first assessed submission, technically assessed in 2020, covered the REDD+ activities "reducing emissions from deforestation" and "reducing emissions from forest degradation" for two subnational priority landscapes. Using a 2009-2018 reference period, the modified and assessed FRELs were 31,353,454.1 t CO2 eq per year for priority landscape 1 in the north-west and 10,723,402.9 t CO2 eq per year for priority landscape 2 in the south-east. The technical assessment states that these FRELs included above-ground biomass, below-ground biomass, deadwood and litter, excluded soil organic carbon, and reported CO2 only.

Liberia's second submission, made in 2026, proposed the country's first national forest reference level (FRL). According to the submission, it covers all five REDD+ activities at national scale, uses a 2020-2024 historical reference period, and reports a proposed FRL of about 120.6 million t CO2 eq per year. The submission states that the benchmark includes above-ground biomass, below-ground biomass, deadwood, litter and soil organic carbon, and that it is linked to national land-use assessment and forest-inventory data as part of Liberia's developing forest monitoring and reporting system.

== Water quality ==
=== Pollution in Monrovia ===
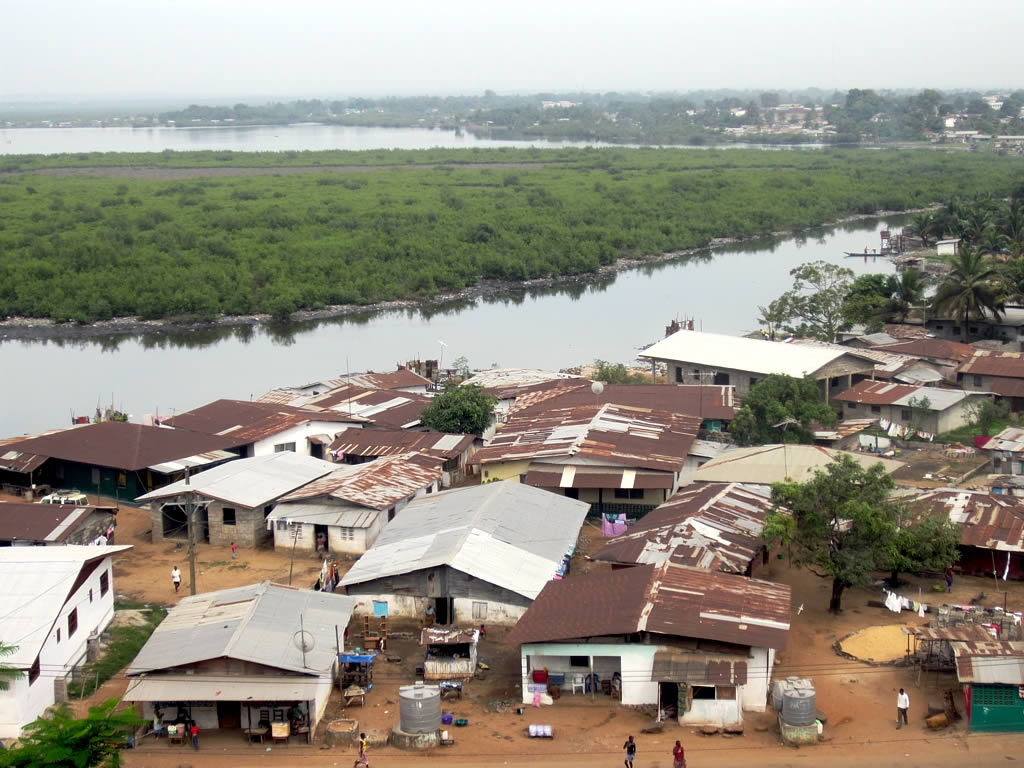
Dwellings along the Mesurado River in Monrovia. Discarded plastics can be seen washed up on the bank opposite the buildings.

Pollution is a significant issue in Liberia's capital city- Monrovia. Piles of household and industrial rubbish in Monrovia build up and are not always collected by sanitation companies paid by the World Bank to collect this waste. In 2009 the World Bank stated that its goal was to increase collection and disposal to 45 percent of Monrovia's daily generated waste by December 2013, an increase of 15 percentage points from 2009.

In 2013, the problem of uncollected rubbish became so acute in the Paynesville area of Monrovia that traders and residents burnt "the huge garbage piles that seemed on the verge of cutting off the main road" out of Monrovia to Kakata.

During Liberia's civil wars, Monrovia went without any formal garbage collection service for 17 years. Residents burnt, buried or dumped their household waste. Swamps near the city were filled with rubbish, and garbage was used to extend riverbanks. The Fiamah neighborhood in central Monrovia was an uncontrolled dump site for the entire city.

Rubbish blocked drains and sewers, causing flooding and stagnant water in which mosquitoes were able to breed. Estimates of only the most evident rubbish piles around the city amounted to more than 70,000 tons of solid waste on the streets. Since 2006 the international community has paid for all rubbish collection and disposal in Monrovia via the World Bank.

Frequent flooding brings environmental problems to residents of Monrovia, as flood water mixes with and carries waste found in swamps that are often on the verge of residential areas.

=== Other ===
The 2004 UN report also said that there was an urgent need to salvage damaged and sunken ships in major ports and coastal sites around Liberia for both environmental and safety reasons.

== Sanitation ==
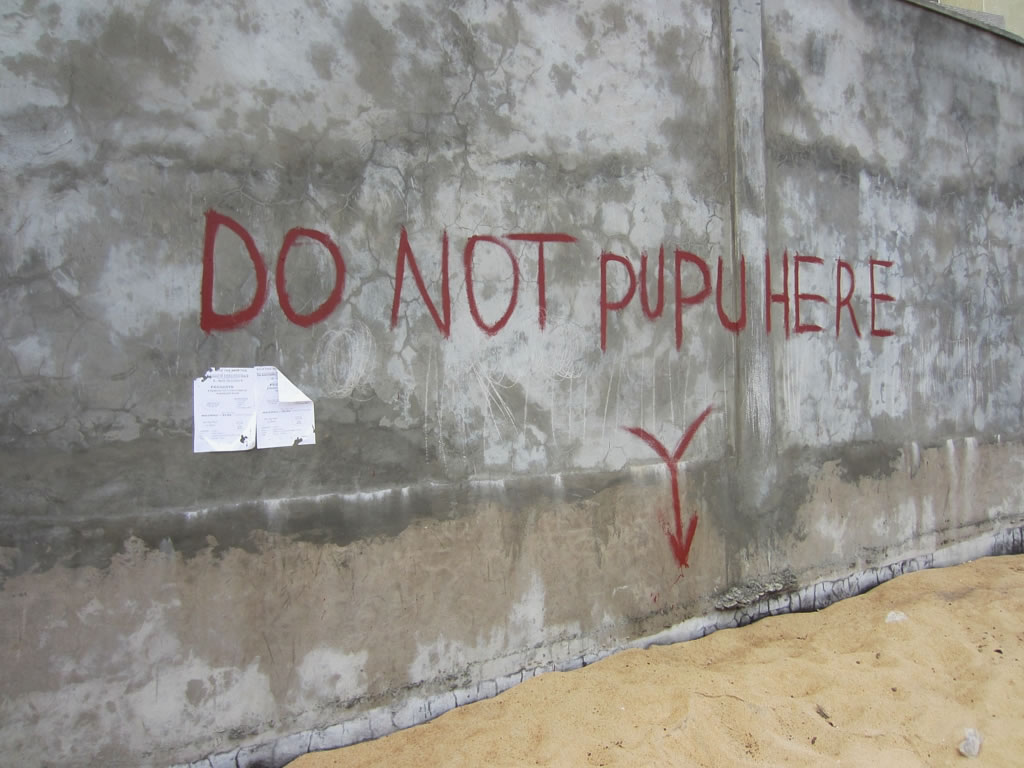
"Do Not Pupu Here" - A sign on a Monrovia beach asking people not to defecate in the area, 2012.

In 2008, one in 25 Liberians had access to a toilet, with most using the nearest bush or beach.

In 2009, one-third of Monrovia's 1.5 million people had access to clean toilets. Those without their own toilets defecate in the narrow alley-ways between their houses, on the beach, or into plastic bags, which they dump on nearby piles of rubbish or into the sea.

Congested housing, no requirement that landlords provide working toilets, and virtually no urban planning "have combined to create lethal sanitation conditions in the capital". The poor infrastructure "means toilet-users may have to use up to four gallons of water each time they flush", according to a civil servant interviewed by IRIN News in 2008. "At US 25 cents a gallon, for some it is a choice between flushing and affording to buy food at the end of the day".

Most Liberians are forced to buy all their water from street vendors at inflated prices. "When some of my neighbours defecate they cannot get enough water to flush their toilets, so they sometimes throw the faeces around the place, exposing us all to health hazards," Monrovia shopkeeper Samuel Tweh told IRIN. Without regular running water, waste flushed into the system often backs up, causing sewage to spill out of manholes into the streets.

In slums like West Point, 70,000 residents have access to four public toilets. In 2009, a visit to a toilet in West Point cost 2.5 US cents. The young men running the latrines said there were around 500 users a day. The facilities "can be smelled 50 metres away, with the floor of each squalid cubicle 15cm deep in soiled newspaper that residents use to wipe their posteriors. Staff use gloved hands to scoop the used paper into a wheelbarrow, which they dump in the nearby river or beach".

== Mining ==
In a 2004 UN environmental report, it was estimated that there were around 5,000 unlicensed and 1,000 licensed mining operations in Liberia. The report said the mines caused damage through the excavation of forests and riverbeds. The report noted that pollutants such as cyanide were used in the mining process, with the cyanide entering rivers. Mercury used in the extraction of gold from ore was also a pollutant mentioned.

== Overfishing ==
See Overfishing in West Africa

== Climate change ==
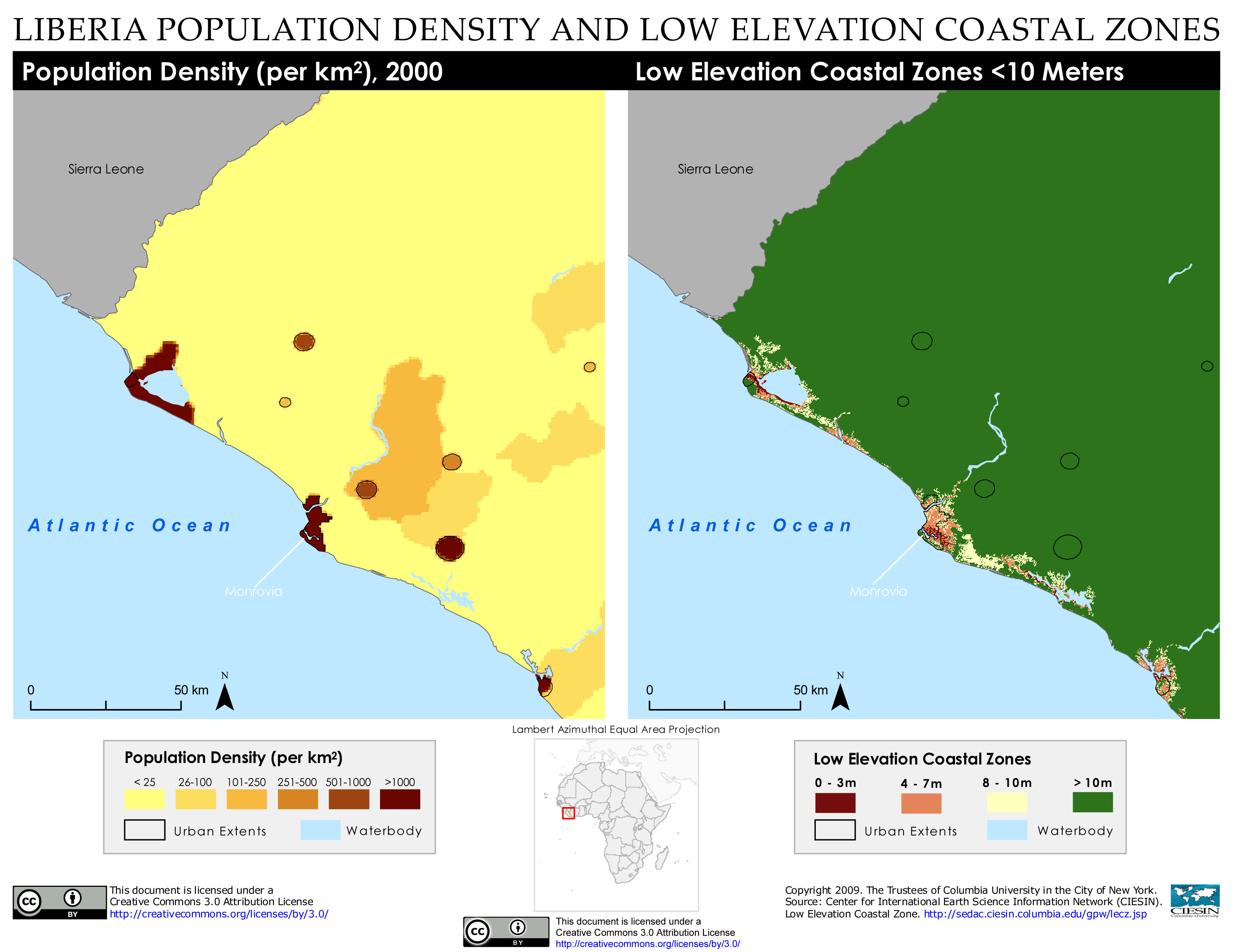
Population density and low elevation coastal zones. Monrovia is especially vulnerable to sea level rise.

Climate change in Liberia causes many problems as Liberia is particularly vulnerable to climate change. Like many other countries in Africa, Liberia both faces existing environmental issues, as well as sustainable development challenges. Because of its location in Africa, it is vulnerable to extreme weather, the coastal effects of sea level rise, and changing water systems and water availability. Climate change is expected to severely impact the economy of Liberia, especially agriculture, fisheries, and forestry. Liberia has been an active participant in international and local policy changes related to climate change.

In March 2024, the World Bank released the Liberia Country and Climate Development Report (CCDR), which highlights the severe threat posed by global climate change to Liberia's stability and economic growth. The report outlines the country's vulnerabilities, including its reliance on natural resources, limited fiscal space, and inadequate infrastructure. It warns that without proactive intervention, climate change could shrink Liberia's economy by 15% and push an additional 1.3 million people into poverty by 2050. Conversely, the report suggests that targeted adaptation efforts could significantly improve resilience for up to 800,000 individuals. The CCDR details a strategy for climate action, focusing on four main themes: climate risks and readiness, essential infrastructure, human development, and sustainable land management. It also calls for improved access to finance, leveraging both concessional funding and private sector investment, to support Liberia's pursuit of inclusive growth and poverty reduction.

== See also ==
- Wildlife of Liberia
