= Gbarpolu-2 =

Electoral district in Liberia

- Constituency for the House of Representatives of Liberia
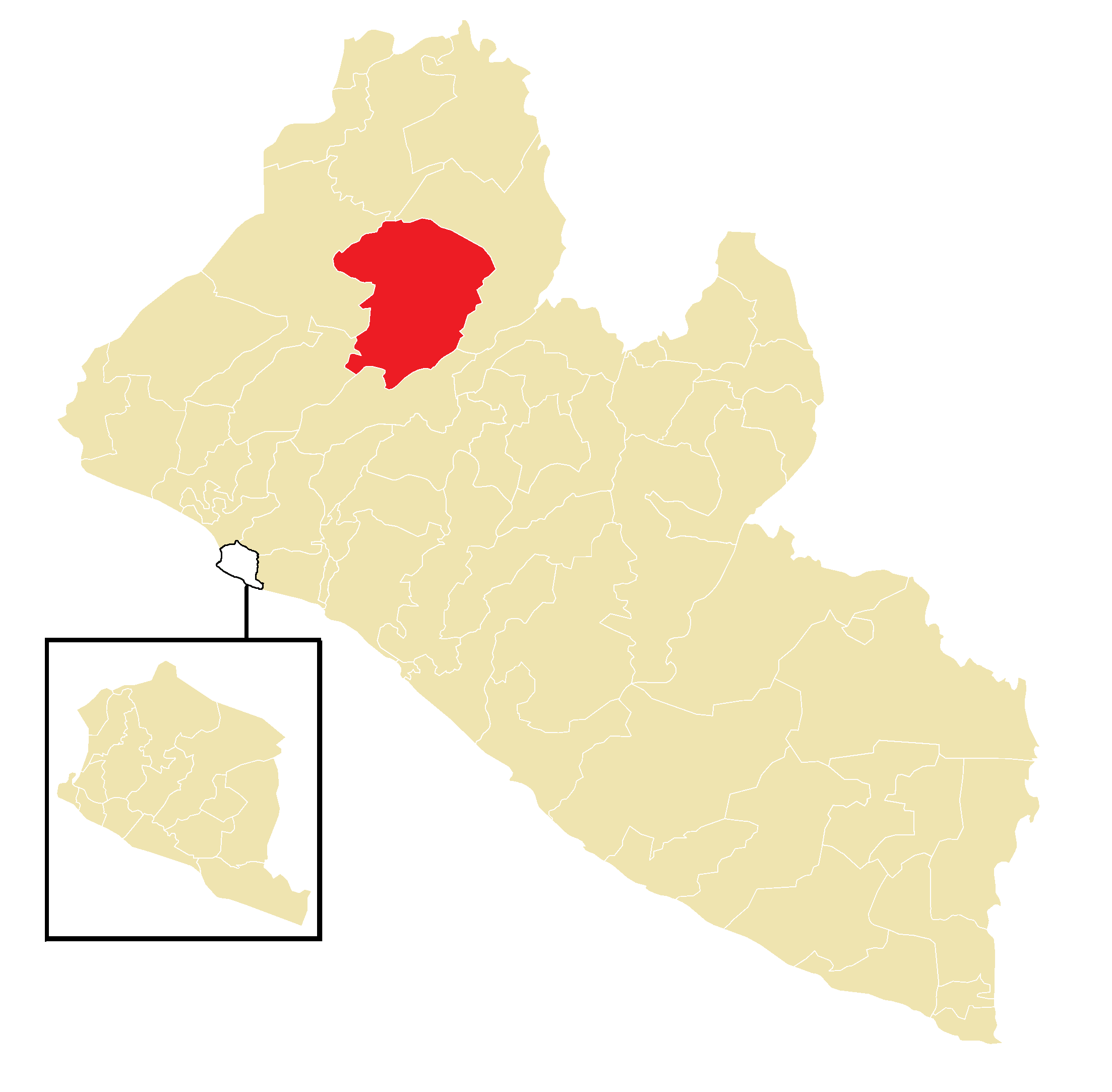
- Electorate: 18,988 (2023)

Current constituency
- Created: 2011
- Representative: Luther S. Collins

Gbarpolu-2 is an electoral district for the elections to the House of Representatives of Liberia. The constituency covers Belleh District, Gounwolaila District and six communities of Bokomu District (Mollakwelle, Salayah, Gungbe-ta, Gbarkagborquoita, Zalakai, Porkpa-Ta).

== Elected representatives ==
Year	Representative elected	Party	Notes
2005	Armah Sarnor	LP	
2011	Malai G. Gbogar	LP	
2017	A. Kanie Wesso	CDC	
2023	Luther S. Collins	IND	

== Election results ==
2005 Gbarpolu County's 2nd House District Election
Candidate	Party	Votes	%
Armah Sarnor	Liberty Party	810	19.14
Momo Gornah Sarnor	Unity Party	785	18.54
Bartu Marie Dorley	National Patriotic Party	773	18.26
Norris Gbartoe David Sr.	National Democratic Party of Liberia	771	18.21
Yassah Gbissi-K Fallah	Coalition for the Transformation of Liberia	663	15.66
Joseph Botoe McCay	Congress for Democratic Change	348	8.22
Filiman Sekou Sanyon	National Reformation Party	83	1.96
Total		4,233	100.00
Valid votes		4,233	94.74
Invalid/blank votes		235	5.26
Total votes		4,468	100.00

2011 Gbarpolu County's 2nd House District Election
Candidate	Party	Votes	%
Malai G. Gbogar	Liberty Party	3,076	34.88
Alaric K. Tokpa	National Democratic Coalition	1,574	17.85
Dickson Temo Yarsiah Sr.	Unity Party	1,214	13.77
Rufus Kpaward Crawu	Victory for Change Party	1,158	13.13
Allen M. Gbowee	National Democratic Party of Liberia	615	6.97
James Sumoward Beyan	Liberia Restoration Party	485	5.50
Alphonso K. David	Liberia Transformation Party	374	4.24
J. Keyah Saah	Congress for Democratic Change	322	3.65
Total		8,818	100.00
Valid votes		8,818	94.85
Invalid/blank votes		479	5.15
Total votes		9,297	100.00

2017 Gbarpolu County's 2nd House District Election
Candidate	Party	Votes	%
A. Kanie Wesso	Coalition for Democratic Change	3,114	24.61
Luther Sandy Collins	Independent	2,643	20.89
Malai G. Gbogar (Incumbent)	People's Unification Party	2,046	16.17
Prince E. G. Tormetie	Liberty Party	1,688	13.34
James S. Beyan	Liberia Restoration Party	514	4.06
Emmanuel Mulbah Kerkula	Alternative National Congress	468	3.70
Morris Yarkpalo Harris	True Whig Party	453	3.58
Borlor T. Harris	Movement for Economic Empowerment	372	2.94
K. Moses Monlonporlor	Vision for Liberia Transformation	362	2.86
Peter J. Torkwelleh Jr.	Movement for Democracy and Reconstruction	348	2.75
Albert K. Samukai Sr.	Liberia National Union	248	1.96
Cole Sumo Payne	Coalition for Liberia's Progress	146	1.15
Sumo D. M. Gwilly	All Liberian Party	119	0.94
Charles F. Mulbah Sr.	United People's Party	91	0.72
Reuben Larkpawolo	Liberia Transformation Party	42	0.33
Total		12,654	100.00
Valid votes		12,654	95.49
Invalid/blank votes		598	4.51
Total votes		13,252	100.00
