= Gibi (disambiguation) =

Gibi or gibi- is a binary prefix.

Gibi may also refer to:

- Gibi, a Brazilian Portuguese term for Brazilian comics
- Gibi ASMR (born 1994), American ASMR performer
- Gibi District, Liberia
- Gibi Mountain Formation, see Geology of Liberia
- Gibi National Forest, Liberia

== See also ==
- Hebén, a grape variety descended from the North African Gibi table grape
- Tom Gibis (born 1964), American voice actor
