= Hyperolius wermuthi =

Conservation status
- Near Threatened (IUCN 3.1)

Scientific classification
- Kingdom: Animalia
- Phylum: Chordata
- Class: Amphibia
- Order: Anura
- Family: Hyperoliidae
- Genus: Hyperolius
- Species: H. wermuthi

Binomial name
- Hyperolius wermuthi Laurent, 1961

Species of frog

Hyperolius wermuthi is a species of frog in the family Hyperoliidae. It is found in Ivory Coast, southern Guinea, and Liberia. The correct name for this species is likely Hyperolius soror. It is so similar to Hyperolius fusciventris that it has likely been overlooked elsewhere in West Africa. Common name Wermuth's reed frog has been coined for this species.

== Taxonomy ==
Taxonomic status of this species described by Belgian herpetologist Raymond Laurent in 1961 is unsettled. The Amphibian Species of the World treats Hyperolius wermuthi as a valid species but notes that Hyperolius soror is likely its synonym. The AmphibiaWeb, however, considers Hyperolius soror a nomen dubium, even though it acknowledges that Hyperolius soror might be the correct name Hyperolius wermuthi.

== Description ==
Males measure 18–23 mm (0.71–0.91 in) and females 22–29 mm (0.87–1.14 in) in snout–vent length. There are two distinct colour phases, "J" and "F", although also intermediate forms exist. Juveniles and many mature males have phase J whereas mature females and some mature males have phase F. Phase J individuals are brownish to green with paired light dorsolateral lines or an hourglass pattern. Phase F is often colorful and variable and show a red canthal stripe that is characteristic to this species. The ventrum is transparent bluish green.

== Habitat and conservation ==
Its natural habitats are primary forests at elevations up to 1,000 m (3,300 ft) above sea level. Breeding takes place in swamps and small temporary ponds.

It is threatened by habitat loss and deterioration caused by agricultural expansion, logging, and encroaching human settlements. The species occurs in the Nimba National Forest.
