= Wildlife of Liberia =

Topographic map of Liberia

The wildlife of Liberia consists of the flora and fauna of the Republic of Liberia. This West African nation has a long Atlantic coastline and a range of habitat types, with a corresponding diversity of plants and animals. Liberia is considered a biodiversity hotspot and has more intact forests characteristic of the Upper Guinea Massif than do neighbouring countries. There are 2000 species of vascular plants (including 225 tree species), approximately 140 species of mammals, and over 600 species of birds.

== Geography ==
The country lies close to the equator with a long coastline on the Atlantic Ocean. The terrain consists of flat or undulating coastal plains, which rise to a rolling plateau and low mountains in the northeast. A number of short rivers flow from northeast to southwest. The coastal area is characterised by swamps and mangrove forests, while inland the tropical forests give way to grassland on the drier plateau area. The climate is equatorial with some rain all year round but the main rainy season falling between May and October. Most of the coastal area receives about 4,000 mm (157 in) of rain per year but this decreases inland, with the northern part of the country being the driest, with just half the coastal rainfall.

The coastal area west of Monrovia is forested and has coastal swamps and lagoons, and there are swamps around the lagoon of Bassa Bwa, but there are no substantial wetlands inland.

== Biodiversity ==
Liberia can be considered a biodiversity hotspot and has the highest remaining portion of the forests of the Upper Guinea Massif, containing many species endemic to the region. This humid coastal forest ecosystem extends from Liberia through Cote d'Ivoire, Ghana and Sierra Leone to Togo, and is under threat from deforestation and coastal development. Liberia has more than 2000 species of vascular plant including 225 timber tree species, 140 species of mammal, over 600 species of bird and 75 species of reptile and amphibian.

=== Flora ===
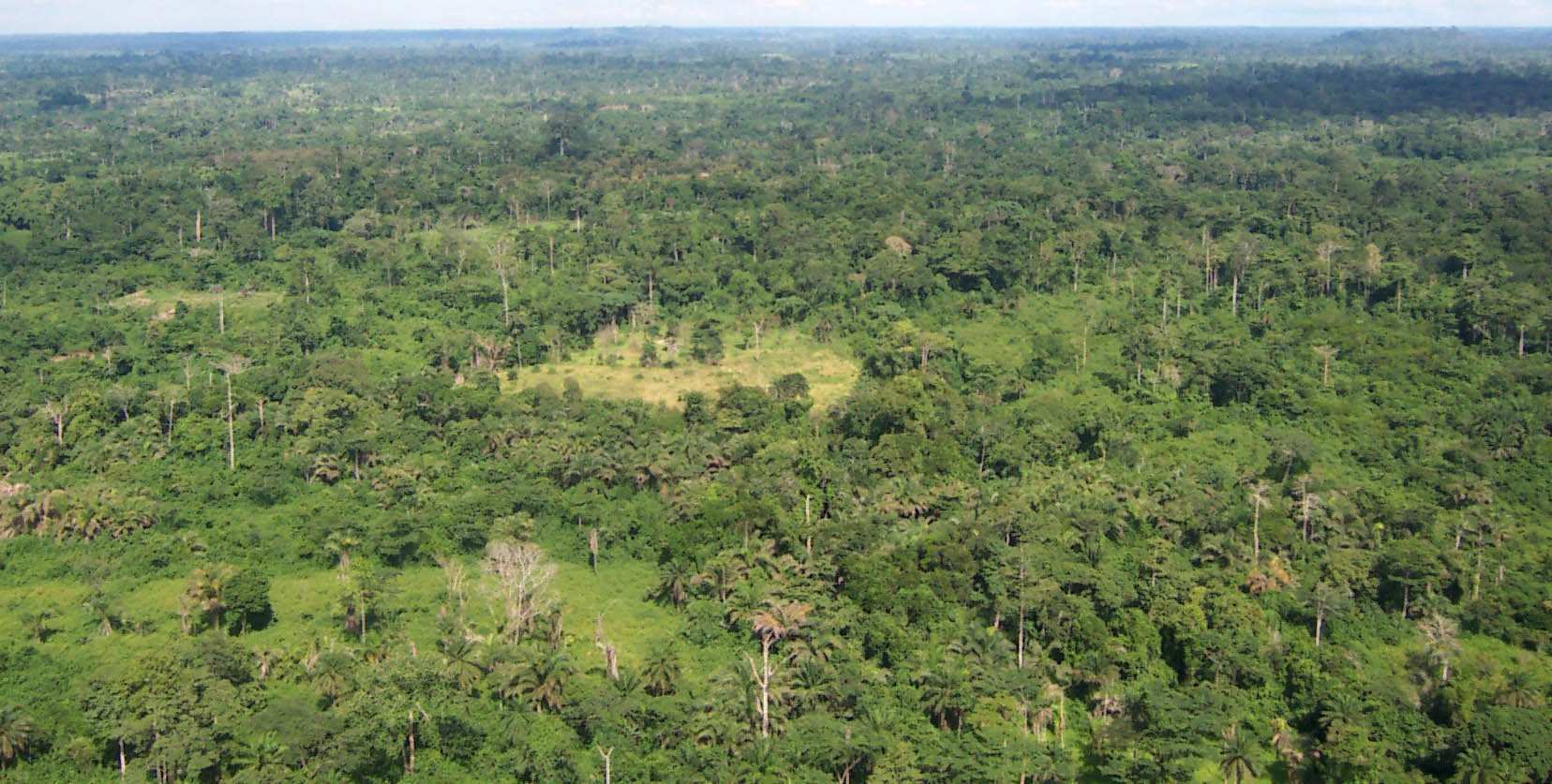
A Liberian tropical forest

Two main types of forest are found in Liberia. Evergreen forests in the south east of the country, which has very high rainfall, are characterised by dense vegetation with trees of varying heights. Sapo National Park exemplifies this forest type, and contains many endemic species. Moist semi-deciduous forest is found in the central and northwestern parts of the country with slightly lower rainfall. This has a more even height and a more open aspect. In 2009 it was estimated that forest cover amounted to about 32% of the country's area. There are eleven partially protected national forests.

Patches of mangrove occur along the coast and near the mouth of many rivers, often lining the banks of the rivers' lower reaches. Mangrove ecosystems are important for biodiversity, as a habitat for crustaceans and young fish, for flood control and erosion control. However, mangroves are threatened by overharvesting for charcoal and firewood, and already there are few remaining areas of primary forest.

=== Fauna ===
==== Mammals ====
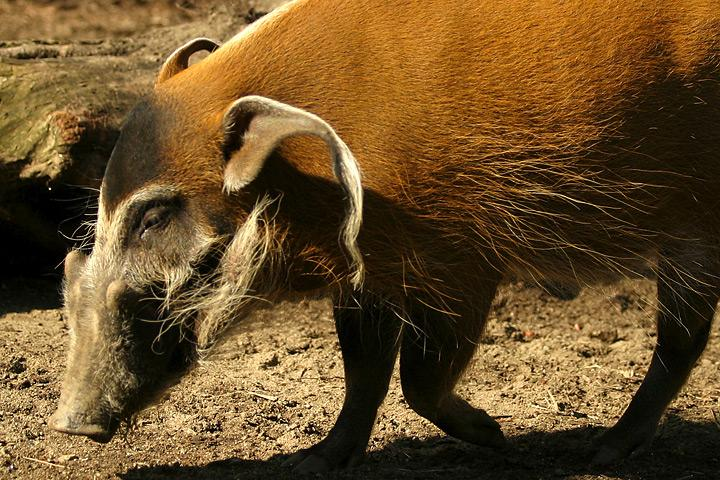
Red river hog

The pygmy hippopotamus occurs in riverine forests inland, for example those beside the Lofa, Cestos and Cavalla Rivers. Liberia is its main habitat, with smaller populations in neighbouring countries. The African manatee also occurs along the coast and in many of the river systems. Other mammals found in the forests are leopards, monkeys, chimpanzees, antelopes, elephants and anteaters. The Liberian mongoose is probably the rarest mammal, none having been seen for years until one was captured in 1989; it is hunted for bushmeat and classified as vulnerable by the IUCN. The red river hog is much more common.

Sapo National Park hosts around 125 species of mammal. These include the African golden cat, the drill, seven species of monkey, Gola malimbe and the Liberian mongoose. The park is also home to the African civet, giant forest hog, speckle-throated otter, seven species of duiker, the water chevrotain and three species of pangolins.

==== Birds ====
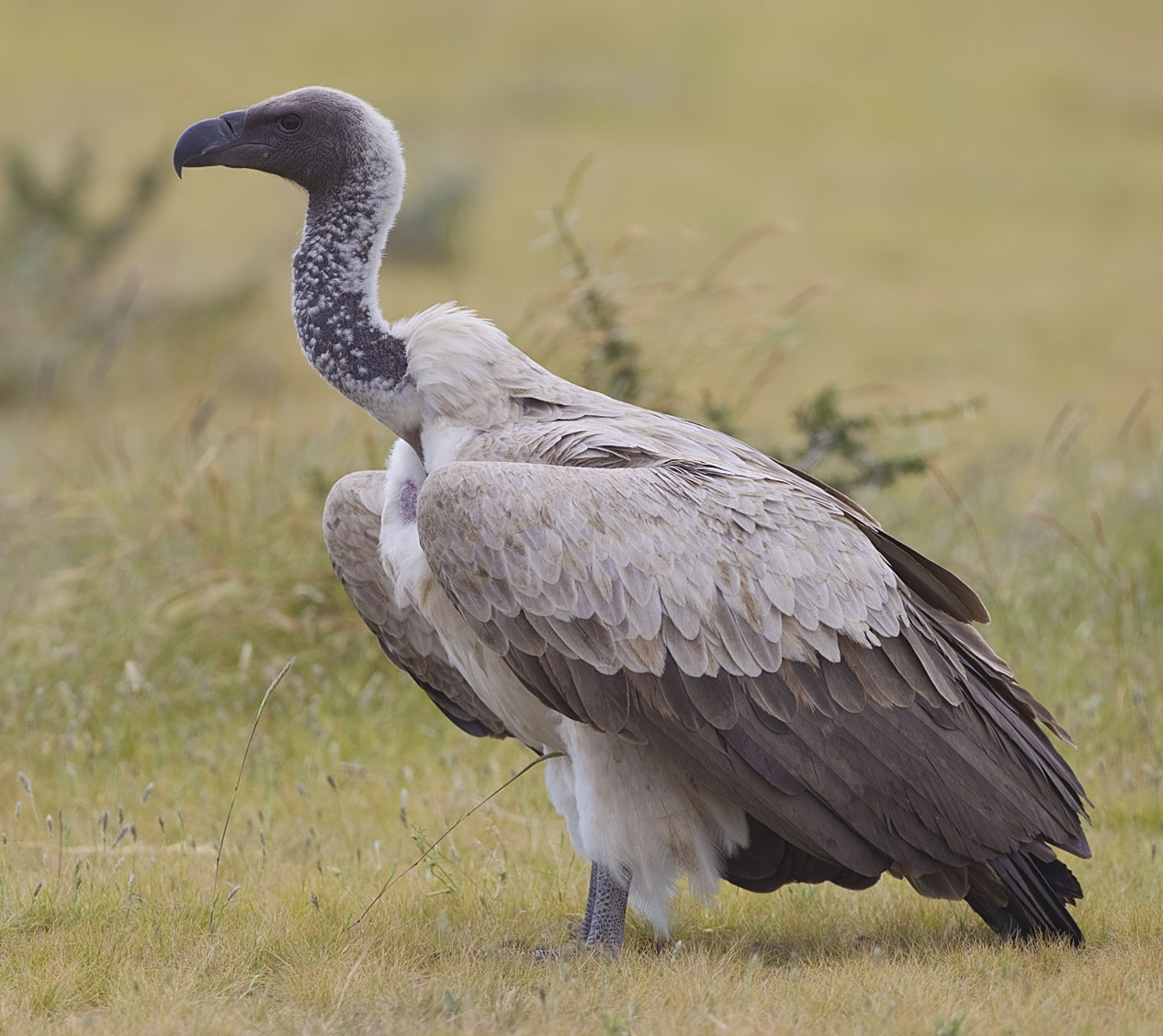
White-backed vulture

As of 2016, the number of bird species recorded in Liberia is 695, some resident and some migratory, with 21 of them being globally threatened. These rare species include the white-backed vulture, the hooded vulture and the Balearic shearwater. Lake Piso, a coastal lagoon, is one of five wetland sites in the country which have been designated as Ramsar sites. Some of the larger birds found in the rainforest are parrots, woodpeckers and hornbills. Flamingoes are found in the coastal swamps and lagoons. Other resident species are the black-collared lovebird, the blue-headed wood-dove, the white-breasted guineafowl and the white-necked rockfowl. The pepper bird (Pycnonotus barbatus) is the national bird.

Around 590 species of bird have been recorded in Sapo National Park. These include the white-breasted guineafowl and white-necked rockfowl, the African fish eagle, the African grey parrot, the great blue turaco, the woodland kingfisher, egrets, hornbills, bee-eaters, rollers and sunbirds.

==== Reptiles and amphibians ====
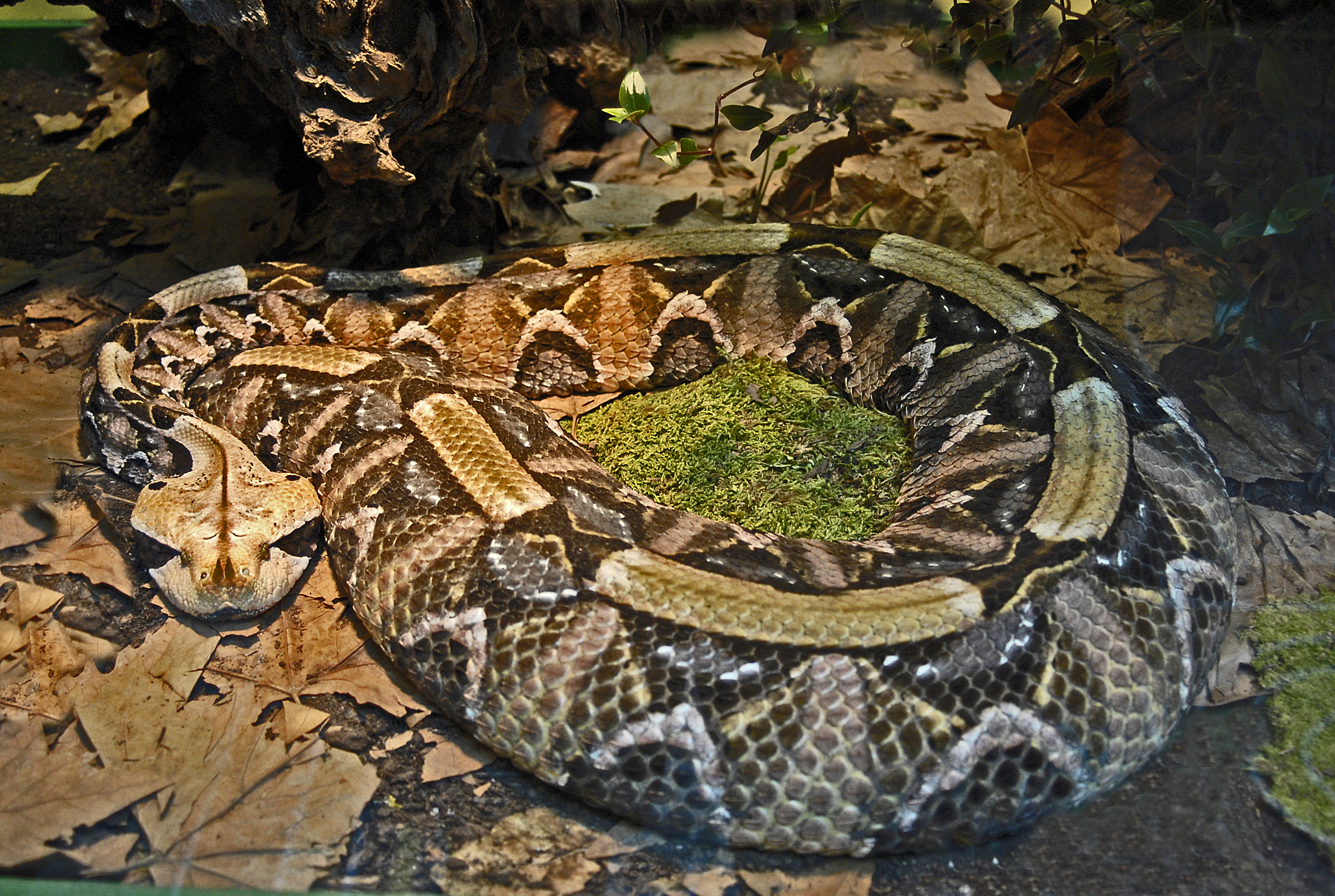
Bitis rhinoceros

The Nile crocodile and the dwarf crocodile occur in the coastal mangrove swamps but are rare, while the West African crocodile occurs further inland and is relatively common. There are a wide variety of lizards, chameleons, geckos and snakes, including Bitis rhinoceros, a venomous viper endemic to West Africa, slender tree snakes that feed on birds and their eggs, and blind snakes in the genus Typhlops. Six species of turtle are found in Liberia, three marine and three freshwater, although one of the latter, the forest hinge-back tortoise is largely terrestrial.

With the high rainfall, amphibians are plentiful in the country, and include several genera endemic to the region including Silurana, Hymenochirus and Pseudhymenochirus. Other frogs native to Liberia include the African common toad, the western clawed frog, and the crowned bullfrog. A number of species of tree frog live in the foliage of trees, and the worm-like caecilian Geotrypetes seraphini inhabits ants' nests.

==== Fish ====
Freshwater fish found in the lakes, rivers, streams and brackish swamps of Liberia include the African brown knifefish, the Guinean killifish, the Jeanpol's killi, the Norman's lampeye, the Rancurel's lampeye and the banded lampeye. The rough-head sea catfish occurs in brackish and marine habitats and is of interest to fisheries. Other commercially-fished species are the Madeiran and round sardinellas, the Spanish mackerel, the bonga, and the European anchovy, and large quantities of shrimps and lobsters are brought ashore.

==== Butterflies and moths ====
About 530 species of butterfly are known to be from Liberia, one of which is endemic.

== Conservation ==
Like other West African nations, Liberia is experiencing destruction of its native forests and a resulting decrease in biodiversity. The main conservation threats are the replacement of forests by rubber plantations, and more recently by oil palm plantations, mining, lumbering, unsustainable firewood collection, charcoal production, the introduction of alien species, slash-and-burn cultivation practices and the uncontrolled hunting and harvesting of wild animals and plants. An action plan, running from 2017 to 2027, has been put in place which is designed to educate the populace in order to "promote the conservation and sustenance of Liberia's rich biological diversity, resources and culture".

== See also ==
- Flora of Liberia
- Environmental issues in Liberia
