= Kpelle National Forest =

Forest in Liberia

- Interactive map of Kpelle National Forest
- Location: Gbarpolu County, Liberia
- Coordinates: 07°30′05″N 10°15′05″W
- Area: 1,748 square kilometres (675 sq mi)
- Established: 1961

The Kpelle National Forest is found in Liberia. It was established in 1961. This site is 1748 km^{2}.
