= Bopolu =

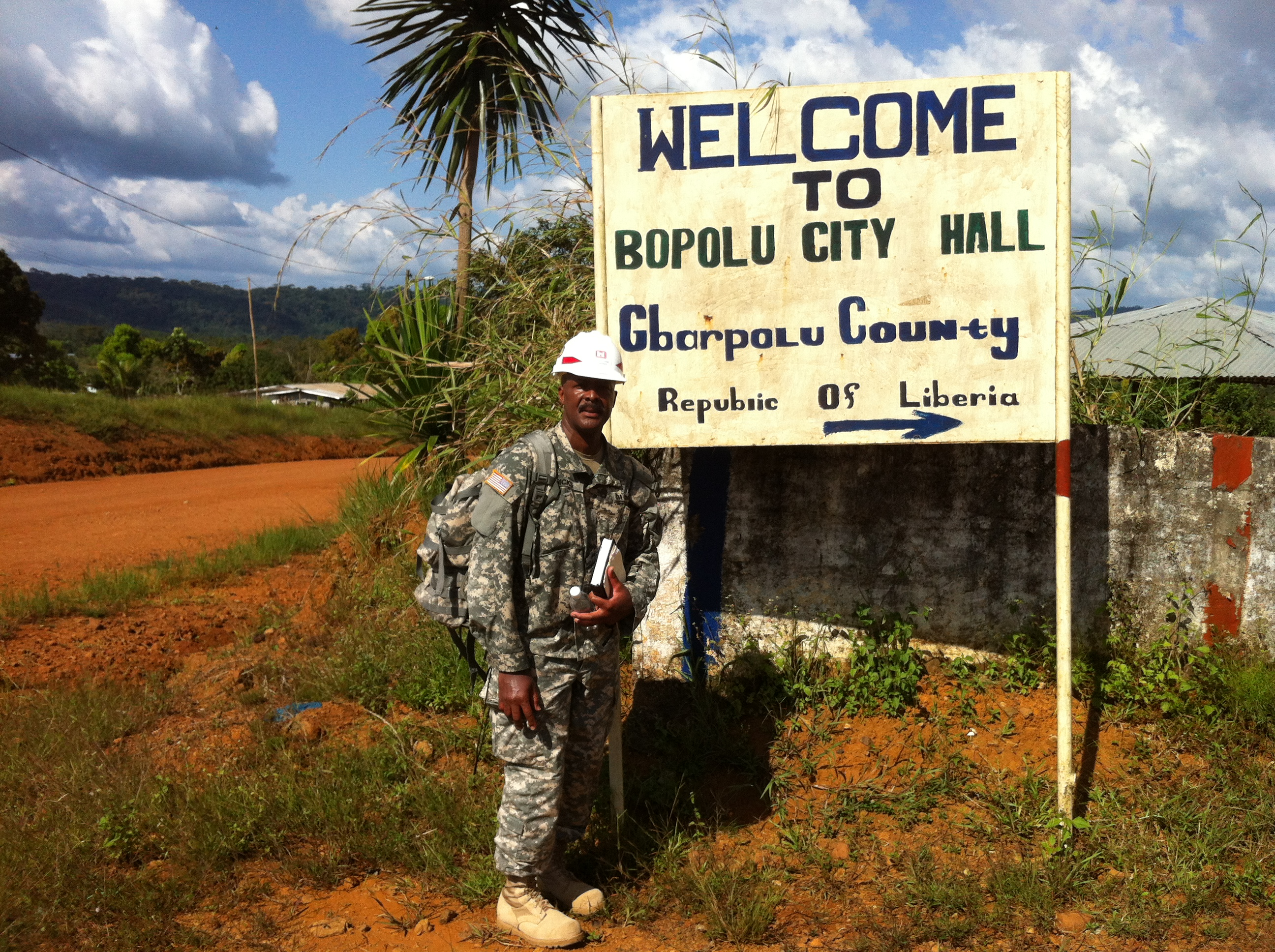

- Location in Liberia
- Coordinates: 7°4′0″N 10°29′15″W
- Country: Liberia
- County: Gbarpolu County
- District: Bopolu District

Population (2008)
  - Total: 2,908
- Climate: Am

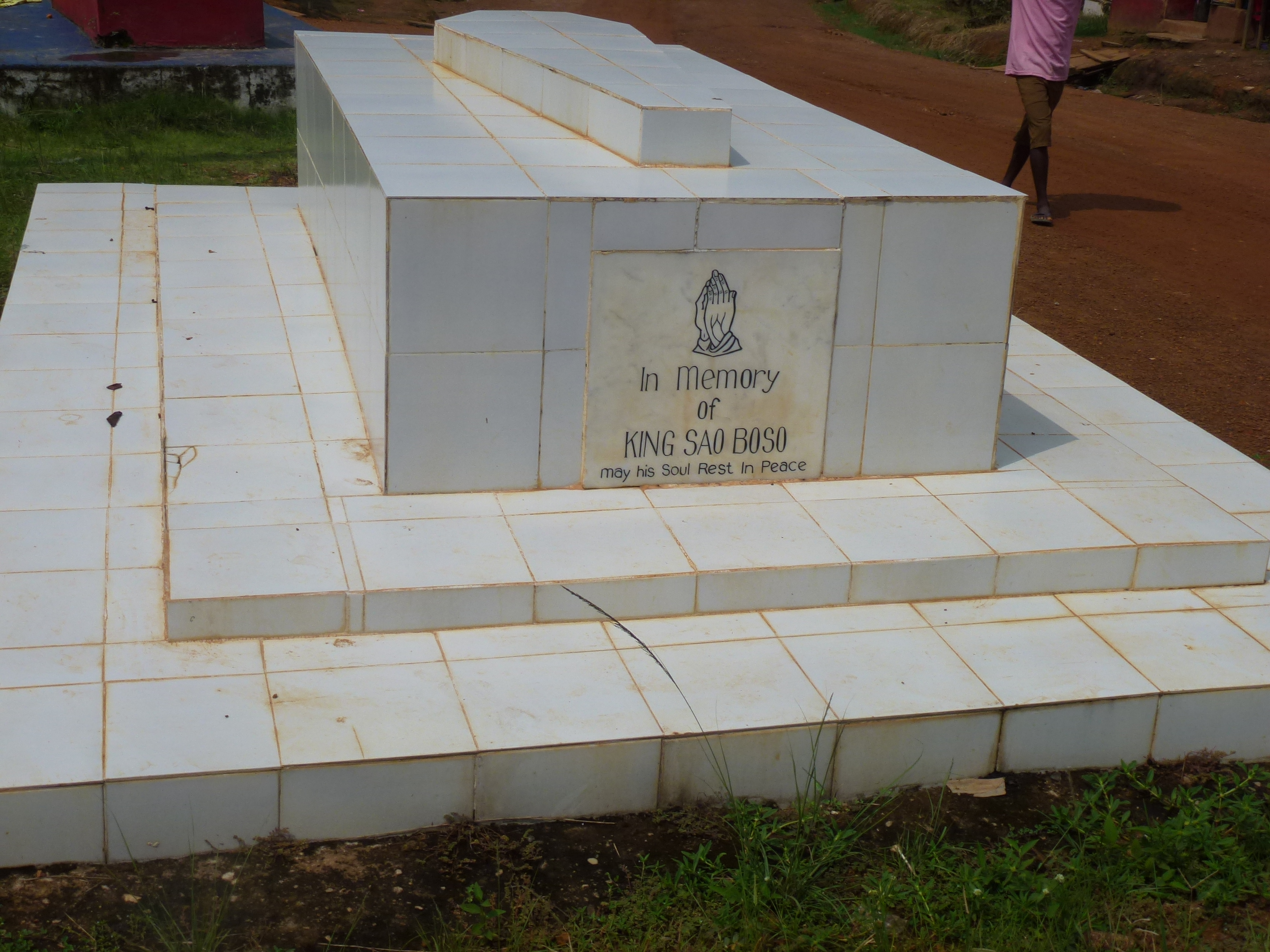
Grave Site of King Sao Boso in Bopolu, Liberia

Bopolu is the capital city of Gbarpolu County, Liberia, and is located 100 kilometers north of Monrovia. As of the 2008 census, Bopolu has a population of 2908. Of this, 1547 were male and 1361 female.

Bopolu was once the center of the Kondo Confederation, which included the Dei, Gola, Lorma, and Vai tribes. The area surrounding Bopolu reached its height of prominence under King Bosan. Traders sent slaves, ivory, gold, and camwood were to the Vai and Dei tribes in exchange for salt, tobacco, guns, and European cloth.

Cultivation of rice and cassava is now Bopolu's main economic activity.
