= Climate change in Liberia =

Emissions, impacts and responses of Liberia related to climate change

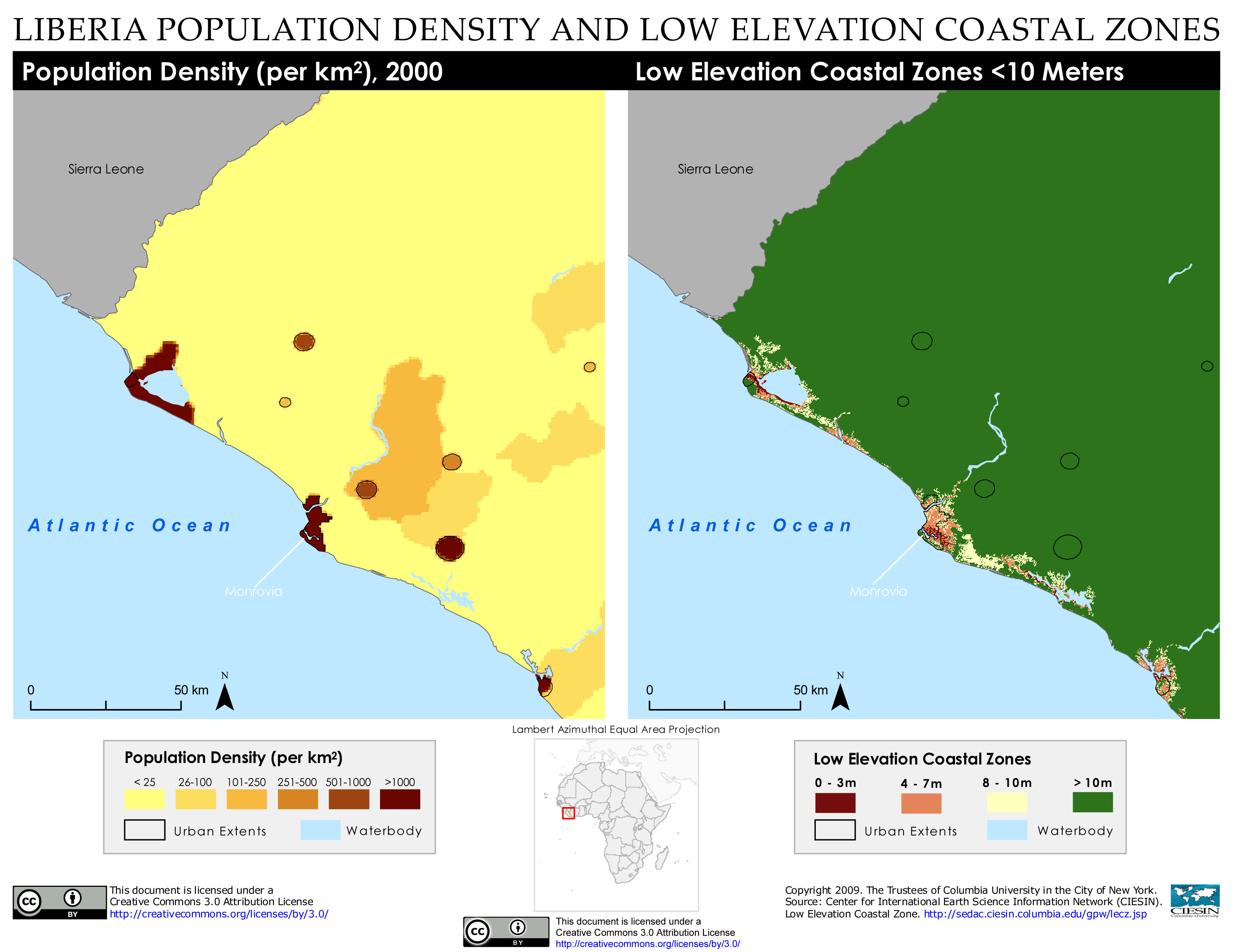
Population density and low elevation coastal zones. Monrovia is especially vulnerable to sea level rise.

Climate change in Liberia causes many problems as Liberia is particularly vulnerable to climate change. Like many other countries in Africa, Liberia both faces existing environmental issues, as well as sustainable development challenges. Because of its location in Africa, it is vulnerable to extreme weather, the coastal effects of sea level rise, and changing water systems and water availability. Climate change is expected to severely impact the economy of Liberia, especially agriculture, fisheries, and forestry. Liberia has been an active participant in international and local policy changes related to climate change.

In March 2024, the World Bank released the Liberia Country and Climate Development Report (CCDR), which highlights the severe threat posed by global climate change to Liberia's stability and economic growth. The report outlines the country's vulnerabilities, including its reliance on natural resources, limited fiscal space, and inadequate infrastructure. It warns that without proactive intervention, climate change could shrink Liberia's economy by 15% and push an additional 1.3 million people into poverty by 2050. Conversely, the report suggests that targeted adaptation efforts could significantly improve resilience for up to 800,000 individuals. The CCDR details a strategy for climate action, focusing on four main themes: climate risks and readiness, essential infrastructure, human development, and sustainable land management. It also calls for improved access to finance, leveraging both concessional funding and private sector investment, to support Liberia's pursuit of inclusive growth and poverty reduction.

== Impacts on the natural environment ==
=== Temperature and weather changes ===
Köppen climate classification map for Liberia for 1980–2016

2071–2100 map under the most intense climate change scenario. Mid-range scenarios are currently considered more likely

=== Sea level rise ===
60% of the population of Liberia lives along the coast. Sea level rise is expected to put pressure on a number of populations, including communities in slums such as the West Point Slum, and incur losses of US$250 million.

=== Water resources ===
High evaporation, changes in seasonal rainfall patterns, and runoff increases are expected to lead to decreased water and worse water quality. Additionally, by the 2020s the Mount Coffee Hydropower Project is expected to have challenges with maintaining water supply. Moreover, sea level rise is expected to cause increase salinization in important coastal communities.

== Impacts on people ==
=== Economic impacts ===
==== Agriculture ====
61% of the GDP and 75% of employment is in the agriculture sector. Climate change is expected to exacerbate extreme weather and decrease crop yields, resulting in food insecurity.

== Mitigation and adaptation ==
=== Policies and legislation ===
The Liberian Environmental Protection Agency launched a national response plan in 2018.

=== International cooperation ===
Liberia was one of the first recipients of the Green Climate Fund, and received significant funding in 2014 from Norway in order to address forestry practices, fossil fuel subsidies, and renewable energy in the country.

== See also ==
- Climate change in Africa
- Environmental Protection Agency (Liberia)
