= Hyperolius soror =

Conservation status
- Least Concern (IUCN 3.1)

Scientific classification
- Kingdom: Animalia
- Phylum: Chordata
- Class: Amphibia
- Order: Anura
- Family: Hyperoliidae
- Genus: Hyperolius
- Species: H. soror

Binomial name
- Hyperolius soror (Chabanaud, 1921)

Synonyms
- Rappia soror Chabanaud, 1921

Species of frog

Hyperolius soror is a species of frog in the family Hyperoliidae. It is endemic to Guinea as it is known with certainty only from Nzérékoré in the southern part of the country, although it is likely that it occurs in adjacent Liberia and western Ivory Coast. Common name soror reed frog has been coined for this species.

== Taxonomy ==
Taxonomic status of this species described by French herpetologist Paul Chabanaud in 1921 is unsettled. The Amphibian Species of the World treats Hyperolius soror as a valid species but notes that Hyperolius wermuthi might be its synonym. The AmphibiaWeb, however, considers it a nomen dubium, but acknowledges that it might be the correct name for Hyperolius wermuthi.

== Habitat ==
Ecology of this species is unknown as researchers after Chabanaud have used the name Hyperolius wermuthi for what likely is this species. It is presumably an inhabitant of primary forest.
