= Guinean killifish =

Conservation status
- Least Concern (IUCN 3.1)

Scientific classification
- Kingdom: Animalia
- Phylum: Chordata
- Class: Actinopterygii
- Order: Cyprinodontiformes
- Family: Nothobranchiidae
- Genus: Archiaphyosemion; Radda, 1977
- Species: A. guineense

Binomial name
- Archiaphyosemion guineense (Daget, 1954)

Synonyms
- Aphyosemion guineense Daget, 1954; Roloffia guineensis (Daget, 1954)

Species of fish

The Guinean killifish (Archiaphyosemion guineense) is a species of African rivuline killifish from the family Nothobranchiidae native to the African nations of Guinea, Liberia, and Sierra Leone, where it is found in savanna streams and pools. This species grows to a length of 7 cm (2.8 in). It is found in the aquarium trade, where it has a reputation as being a difficult fish to keep.
