= Gbarpolu County =

County of Liberia

- County
- Flag

- Location in Liberia
- Coordinates: 7°10′N 10°25′W
- Country: Liberia
- Capital: Bopulu
- Districts: 6
- Established: 2001

Government
  - Superintendent: Allen Gbowee

Area
  - Total: 9,689 km^{2} (3,741 sq mi)

Population (2008)
  - Total: 83,758
  - Density: 8.6/km^{2} (22/sq mi)
- Time zone: UTC+0 (GMT)
- HDI (2018): 0.405 low · 11th of 15

Gbarpolu is a county in the northern portion of Liberia. One of 15 counties that comprise the first-level of administrative division in the nation, it has six districts. Bopulu serves as the capital with the area of the county measuring 3,741 square miles (9,690 km^{2}). As of the 2008 Census, it had a population of 83,758, making it the eleventh-most populous county in Liberia.

Created in 2001 when it was split from Lofa County, Gbarpolu is the youngest county in Liberia. As of 2013, the County Superintendent was Allen Gbowee.

The county is bordered by Grand Cape Mount County to the west, Bomi County to the southwest, Bong County to the south, and Lofa County to the east and north. The northwest part of Gbarpolu borders the nation of Sierra Leone. The Gola Forest straddles this border and is home to the Gola Forest community.

The majority of Gbarpolu County consists of forests. Mining was the primary economic activity prior to the First Liberian Civil War, in addition to subsistence farming. However, the Second Liberian Civil War devastated all sectors of the county.

Gbarpolu County also produces timber and coal.

The county flag features a diamond, a tree, and the flag of Liberia on a yellow background.

== Districts ==
The districts of Gbarpolu County, with their 2008 populations, include:

- Belleh District (17,288)
- Bokomu District (10,460)
- Bopolu District (18,298)
- Gbarma District (15,972)
- Gounwolaila District (8,115)
- Kongba District (13,625)

== Gola Forest community ==
The Gola Forest straddles the border between Liberia and Sierra Leone and is home to diverse species of importance to the country. In Sierra Leone, the forest is incorporated into the Gola National Forest, and because of the unity of the forest with Liberia, considerations of conservation must consider a collaborative management with Liberian inhabitants as well.

Within the Liberian portion of the forest reside four clans: the Sorkpo Clan in Porkpa District, the Tonglay and Zuie clans within Kongba District, and the Jawijah Chiefdom. There are 24 villages within the Liberian portion of the forest, most of which are accessible by road, but several are accessible only by footpath. Residents of these remote villages use footpaths to bring their commodities and services to the other towns with motor roads.

Leadership within the community is purely by traditional authorities, but centers of such authority are very few in relation to the number of temporary mining camps. The landlord-stranger system is the main means to regulate the activities of migrants to the forest (mainly miners), but the system is currently weak due to the town being distant and limited roads, transportation, and communications. Some chiefs are not correctly installed or properly elected and therefore lack authority amongst disgruntled illegal miners.

Most of the original Gola inhabitants became refugees during the First Liberian Civil War and were slow to return and reassert control of their villages. The war had lasted for over fourteen years, a time too long for people who have had several relocations to return to their former communities. With the coming of the Western Cluster in the community, many of the people are expected to return to their original communities, as many could begin finding employment. Others will have time to begin other agricultural activities that might contribute to the loss of biological diversity.

== See also ==
- 2014 Ebola virus epidemic in Liberia
