= Wonegizi Nature Conservation Unit =

Proposed nature reserve in Liberia

- IUCN category IV (habitat/species management area)
- Interactive map of Wonegizi Nature Conservation Unit
- Location: Lofa County, Liberia
- Coordinates: 8°20′00″N 9°35′00″W
- Area: 202 km^{2} (78 sq mi)

The Wonegizi Nature Conservation Unit is a proposed nature reserve in Liberia. Proposed in 1987, the site covers an area of 202 km^{2} (78 sq mi).

== Geography ==
The site comprises the Wonegizi Mountains in the north-west of Liberia, along the international border with Guinea. The range is a southern spur of the Guinea Highlands, and includes the third-highest peak in Liberia. It is contiguous with the Ziama Massif Biosphere Reserve in Guinea. The landscape is rugged, with cliffs and rocky outcrops. The vegetation is mainly semi-deciduous forest, similar to that found of the Wologizi mountains 50 km to the west. There is an altitudinal transition from lowland rainforest to semi-montane Parinari dominated forest at higher elevations.

=== Environment ===
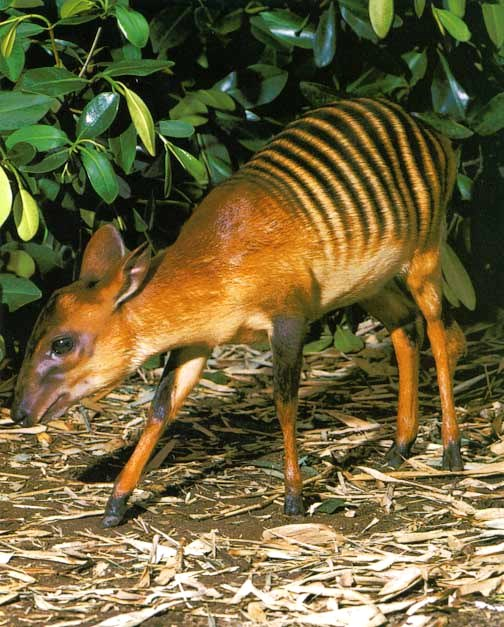
Zebra duiker

The site has been designated an Important Bird Area (IBA) by BirdLife International because it supports significant populations of many bird species. Mammals recorded from the site include forest elephants, western chimpanzees, bongo antelopes and zebra duikers.
