= Belleh District =

District of Liberia

Coordinates: 7.854°N 9.991°W

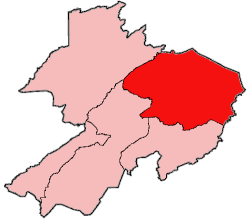
Location of Belleh District in Gbarpolu County

Belleh District is one of five districts located in Gbarpolu County, Liberia, and a second-level administrative division. It was one of five districts that were moved from Lofa County to create Gbarpolu County in 2001. Situated in the northeast corner, it forms part of the county's border with Lofa County.
