= Gbarma District =

District of Liberia

Coordinates: 6°59′41″N 10°47′18″W

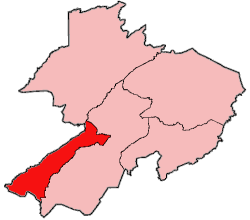
Location of Gbarma District in Gbarpolu County

Gbarma District is one of five districts located in Gbarpolu County, Liberia.
