= Kongba District =

District of Liberia

Coordinates: 7.789°N 10.485°W

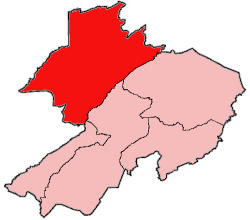
Location of Kongba District in Gbarpolu County

Kongba District is one of five administrative divisions located in Gbarpolu County, Liberia.

== Economy and Society ==
All towns and villages are involved in mining activities and have large expatriate populations from countries such as Guinea, Sierra Leone, Mali, Burkina Faso, and Niger. Whenever there is a new discovery of diamonds or gold in a village there is a large migration of both miners and business people to that particular center for the time the minerals are being mined. Livelihood activities include farming (slash-and-burn), alluvial mining of diamonds and gold and hunting of bush meat. Over 50% of the villages have fewer than 100 inhabitants. Kungbor has the largest population, followed by Zuie and Nomo. Butter Hill, Nomo, Fula Camp, Camp Israel, Fornor, Kawelahun and Kungbor are of medium size. There are two types of communities: the more permanent and stable communities - which have developed retail services, palm oil production, cocoa and coffee cultivations and more established houses (with zinc roofs), and the unstable transient towns or camps which are newly established or only inhabited in the dry season when mining activities take place. On this basis, six forest edge villages in Grand Camp area and eleven in Zui clan are classed as permanent settlements. Five communities in Gbarpolu County are classed as not stable.

== Language ==
Both Mende and Gola are spoken in Kongba district. Mende is preferred for general usage as it is largely understood both by the indigenous population as well as the expatriate worker community, but for issues regarding land ownership disputes, Gola is preferred as it is generally only understood by the indigenous population and excludes the expatriate community from such discussions.

== Surfeit of men ==
The ratio of men to women throughout the district skews higher than average, due to the overwhelming reliance on mining as an economic activity. District-wide, the ratio of men to women is 3:1, with 70% of the villages having more men than women. In one village, Sonah Creek, the population consisted solely of men. Similarly, gender ratios in Soso camp (17 times more males) and ULC (9 times more males) are highly skewed towards males.

== History ==
Diamond and gold have been the two major mineral resources of the Kongba community since before the founding of the Republic of Liberia. They have continued to serve the people of the community and others from far and near. As early as the 1900s the people of the community could not pay taxes to government in cash but in goods of diamond and gold. This practice continued until the late 1960s.

During inter-ethnic wars, the Gola people were overpowered because of the British influence in neighboring Sierra Leone and many of the Gola people were absorbed into the Mende-speaking community.
