= Gio National Forest =

Forest area in Nimba County, Liberia

- IUCN category IV (habitat/species management area)
- Interactive map of Gio National Forest
- Location: Nimba County, Liberia
- Nearest city: Bobli
- Coordinates: 6°40′00″N 8°40′00″W
- Area: 327 square kilometres (126 sq mi)
- Established: 1960

The Gio National Forest is a forest area situated in central Nimba County, Liberia. It was established in 1960 and covers an area of about 327 km^{2}.

One of the largest forests in Liberia, located in the northeastern part of the country, the park is now under threat from locals who are building their farms inside it.

The estimate terrain elevation above sea level is 268 metres.

It is a forest that belongs to the vegetation class V.

== Mammals ==
It is thought that the Dan (Gio) National Forest used to support some populations of chimpanzees, but according to a study published in 2003, these populations have either disappeared or occur in very small groups (Kormos et al. 2003)
