= Geology of Liberia =

The geology of Liberia is largely extremely ancient rock formed between 3.5 billion and 539 million years ago in the Archean and the Neoproterozoic, with some rocks from the past 145 million years near the coast. The country has rich iron resources as well as some diamonds, gold and other minerals in ancient sediment formations weathered to higher concentrations by tropical rainfall.

== Stratigraphy and tectonics ==
Two billion to 1.6 billion year old Archean and Paleoproterozoic underlie 90% of Liberia, forming the Man Shield, part of the West African Craton—a region of stable continental crust leftover from early continent formation.

=== Precambrian: Archean-Paleozoic (3.9 billion-539 million years ago) ===
The Leonean Orogeny 3.5 to 2.9 billion years ago and the Liberian Orogeny 2.9 to 2.5 billion years ago both influenced the Archean rocks.

Greenstone belts, sequences of metamorphic and volcanic rocks associated with cratons and used by geologists to study early tectonics are found in south-central Liberia, dating to 2.1 billion years ago. The Todi Shear Zone is a 400 kilometer shear zone extending into Liberia from Sierra Leone, where it separates the Kasila Group and the Kenema Assemblage, before continuing offshore. In Liberia, it separates the granite and greenstone Archean rocks from Neoproterozoic granulite and amphibolite rocks, dating to the Pan-African orogeny. Gneiss rocks in both the Archean and the Pan-African rocks are metamorphosed to an intermediate amphibolite grade, part of the concept of metamorphic facies in which different metamorphic mineral assemblies form under similar temperature and pressure.

The clastic sedimentary rocks Gibi Mountain Formation, 32 kilometers north of the Todi Shear Zone form two heavily forested hills, lying unconformably on top of Archean gneiss. The Gibi Mountain Formation, in turn is overlain by quartzite klippe features, a form of remnant thrust fault terrain, that contains itabirite. Based on similarities between the Gibi Mountain Formation and the Rokel River Group in Sierra Leone, it appears that it formed between the late Neoproterozoic and the Cambrian. In both formations, there is a sequence of conglomerate, arkose siltstone, sandstone and shale. The conglomerate at the base of the Gibi Mountain Formation is believed to be remnant glacial sediment from the global Snowball Earth event in the Neoproterozoic and corresponds with other glacial deposits around West Africa.

=== Phanerozoic: Paleozoic-Cenozoic (539 million years ago-present) ===
In some places, isolated diabase and gabbro dikes intrude the older Precambrian rocks. Unmetamorphosed sandstone, siltstone, arkose and conglomerate, probably from the Cretaceous are found in a narrow, five kilometer band along the coast, overlain by Neogene marine sediments formed between 23 million and 2.6 million years ago.

== Hydrogeology ==
Virtually all of Liberia's aquifers are in Precambrian basement rock, with the exception of some fractured igneous units and unconsolidated sediments on the northwestern coast.

== Natural resource geology ==
Liberia has some of the largest iron ore reserves in Africa, with iron content of 30% to 67%, in banded iron formations from the Precambrian. The high grade ores, with more than 60% are primarily hematite, while lower grade ores with 30 to 40% iron are generally magnetite. Liberia also has medium-grade deposits of mixed hematite and magnetite. Laterite soils formed as rainfall slowly leached away silicates, a process known as laterization, leaving highly enriched medium and high-grade ores. The Mount Nimba area once had the best reserves, but almost of it has been extracted. The banded iron formations also host lode gold deposits. Because of extensive laterization, Liberia may have significant nickel and cobalt deposits.

Along with Guinea, Sierra Leone and Ivory Coast, Liberia has some of the best diamond potential in Africa, in kimberlite pipes in the underlying Archean Man Shield, although very large deposits of diamonds have not been discovered. Because of political turmoil and violence, most diamond mining is limited to alluvial digging near the border with Sierra Leone and to date, there has not been extensive exploration for offshore placer deposits. Mercury used to separate gold in artisanal mining has contaminated the surface and groundwater in parts of Liberia.

Geophysicist Stephen E. Haggerty, researching small, one hectare kimberlite pipes in Liberia found that Pandanus candelabrum, better known as the chandelier tree, is a kimberlite botanical indicator, growing selectively atop the pipes.

Bauxite, kyanite and barite may also be mineable. Sand and ceramic-grade clay are locally mined throughout the country.
