= Nimba National Forest =

Forest in Liberia

- Mount Nimba Forest Reserves
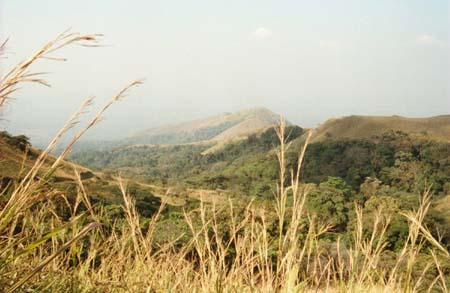
- Landscape in the neighborhood of Mount Nimba, Guinea
- Interactive map of Nimba National Forest
- Location: Nimba County, Liberia
- Coordinates: 7°30′00″N 8°30′00″W
- Area: 187 km^{2} (72 sq mi)

Nimba National Forest is a national forest in Nimba County, Liberia. The forest, which borders Guinea and Ivory Coast, has eastern and western sections that cover 96 km^{2} (37 sq mi) and 91 km^{2} (35 sq mi) respectively. It is also known as the Mount Nimba Forest Reserves.

== Environment ==
It is thought that the reserves supported populations of western chimpanzees before the first and second Liberian civil wars (1987-2003), and local people report that populations increased in those areas during the wars. However, these regions were subsequently heavily impacted by factional fighting, resource extraction and civil displacements.

The forest has been designated an Important Bird Area (IBA) by BirdLife International because it supports significant populations of many bird species. In the Nimba Range area, conservation agreements linked to biodiversity protection and community livelihoods have involved Conservation International Liberia in partnership with ArcelorMittal.
