= Gibi National Forest =

National forest in Liberia

- Interactive map of Gibi National Forest
- Location: Nimba County, Liberia
- Coordinates: 6°18′47″N 8°50′13″W
- Area: 607 square kilometres (234 sq mi)
- Established: 1960

The Gibi National Forest is found in Liberia. It was established in 1960. This site is 607 km^{2}.
