= Bokomu District =

District of Liberia

Coordinates: 7.282°N 10.127°W

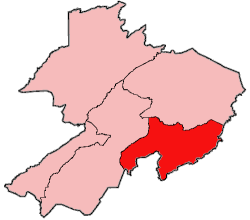
Location of Bokomu District in Gbarpolu County

Bokomu District is one of five districts located in Gbarpolu County, Liberia, which was established in 2001. It is one of the six districts that comprise Gbarpolu County. The total area of Bokomu District is 588 square kilometers. According to the 2022 Census, the population of Bokomu District was 13,684.

== Economy ==
Bokomu District’s economy in Gbarpolu County hinges on a dual reliance on subsistence farming and mining, Mining communities in Bokomu and the neighboring Gou-Nwolailai Districts regarding the transparency and accountability of funds paid by a Chinese mining firm, as reported in 2018.
