= Bopolu District =

District of Liberia

Coordinates: 7°04′00″N 10°29′15″W

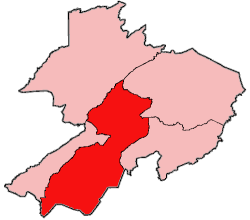
Location of Bopolu District in Gbarpolu County

Bopolu District is one of five districts located in Gbarpolu County, Liberia.
