= Gola National Forest =

The Gola National Forest proclaimed in Liberia in 1960.

The site covers an area of 206,990 ha.

Situated in north-west Liberia (linking to Sierra Leone), it is one of the largest remaining intact areas of seasonal dense moist evergreen and semi-deciduous forest in the whole region.
