= Guinean montane forests =

Ecoregion in Africa

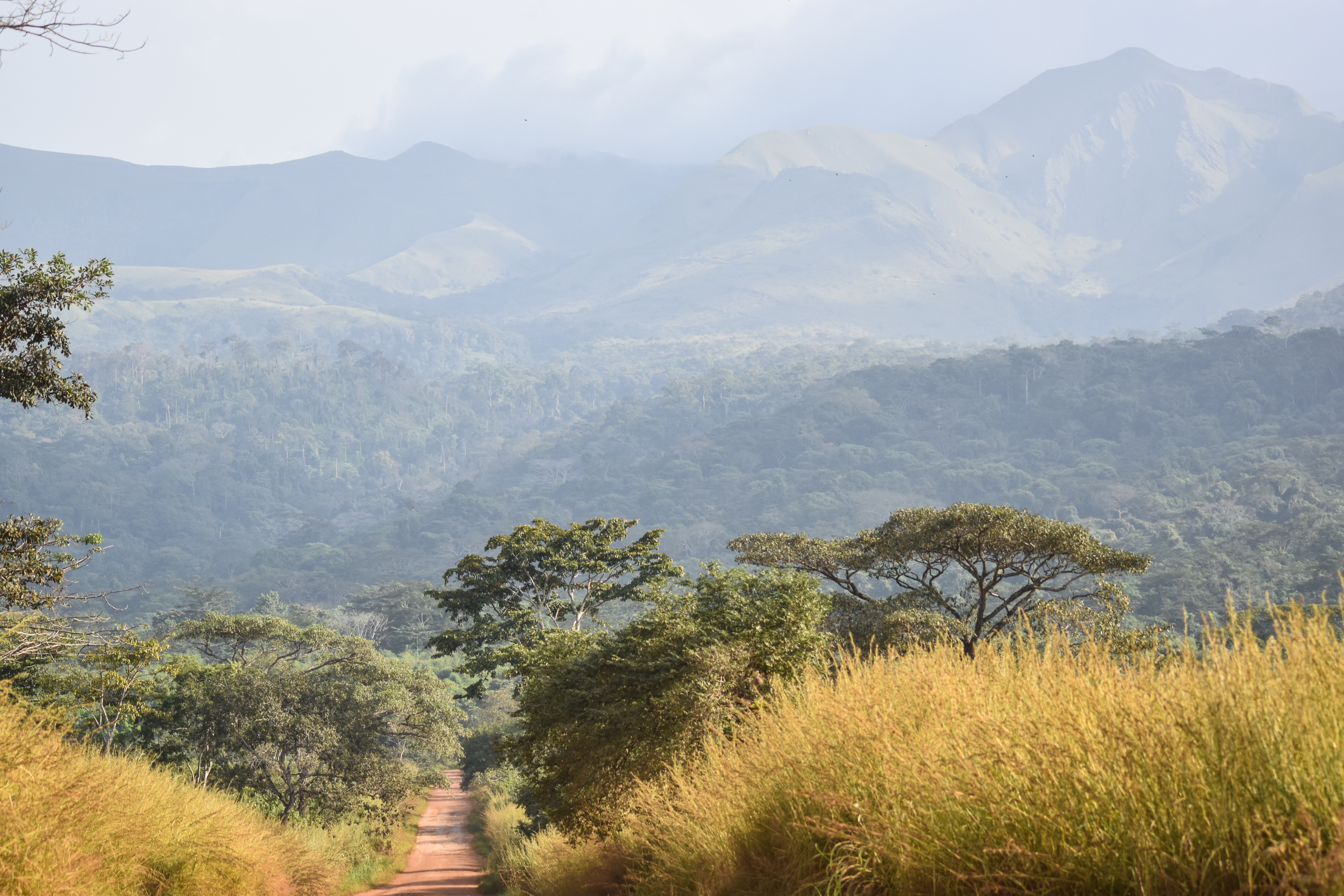
- Nimba Range

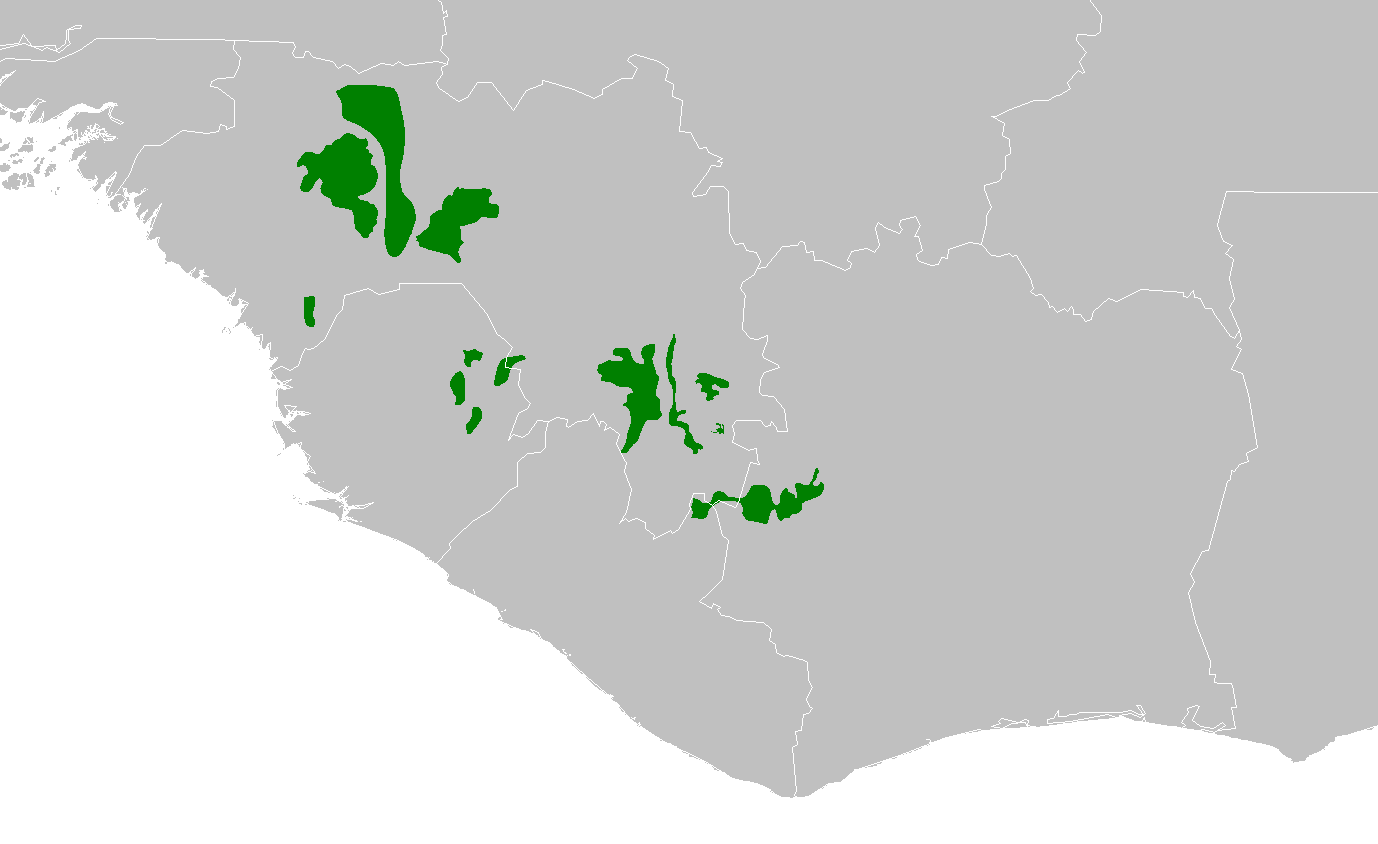
- Map of the Guinean montane forests

Ecology
- Realm: Afrotropical
- Biome: tropical and subtropical moist broadleaf forests
- Borders: Guinean forest-savanna mosaic; Western Guinean lowland forests

Geography
- Area: 30,924 km^{2} (11,940 mi^{2})
- Countries: Guinea; Ivory Coast; Liberia, Sierra Leone
- Coordinates: 9°N 9.4°W

Conservation
- Conservation status: Critical/endangered
- Global 200: Guinean moist forests
- Protected: 8,715 km^{2} (28%)

The Guinean montane forests are a tropical moist broadleaf forest ecoregion of West Africa.

The ecoregion occupies the portions of the Guinea Highlands lying above 600 meters elevation, extending across portions of Guinea, Sierra Leone, Liberia, and Côte d'Ivoire. It includes the Fouta Djallon plateau and the massifs of Ziama, Simandou, Tétini, Béro, Kourandou in Guinea, the Loma Mountains and Tingi Hills in Sierra Leone, the Nimba Range in Guinea, Liberia, and Côte d'Ivoire, and the Monts du Toura in Côte d'Ivoire. Mount Bintumani in the Loma Mountains is the highest peak in West Africa west of Mount Cameroon. The next highest peaks in the region are in the Sankan Biriwa massif (1850 meters) in the Tingi Hills.

Average rainfall is between 1,600 and 2400 mm per year and many important rivers have their sources in these mountains.

== Flora ==
These mountains have a distinct plant cover in various phases according to elevation, with up to 35 endemic species including a Rhipidoglossum orchid found only on Mount Nimba. Common plant types in the humid mountain valleys include Uapaca togoensis, Cola lateritia maclaudii, Parinari excelsa, Piptadeniastrum africanum and Canarium schweinfurthii. Higher altitudes of the Loma and the Tingi are covered with a savanna of Syzygium, Kotschya ochreata, Monechma depauperatum, and the tree ferns, Cyathea subg. Cyathea manniana and Cyathea dregei. Other areas of high prairie are known for Gladiolus, Solenostemon monostachyus latericola, Cyanotis longiflora, and Thesium tenuissimum. Finally the high gallery forest is dominated by Parinari excelsa with the tree fern, Cyathea camerooniana, and the bamboo, Oxytenanthera abyssinica.

Pitcairnia feliciana, the only species of Bromeliad native outside the Americas, is endemic to the Fouta Jallon.

== Fauna ==
Leopards (Panthera pardus) are the largest predator in the ecoregion. The ecoregion supports populations of the endangered western chimpanzee (Pan troglodytes verus).

Near-endemic birds include Sierra Leone prinia (Prinia leontica) and the iris glossy-starling (Coccycolius iris).

Endemic amphibians include the western Nimba toad (Nimbaphrynoides occidentalis), found only in the montane grasslands of the Nimba Range, and which is totally viviparous. The Guinea screeching frog (Arthroleptis crusculum) is a threatened species found in the Nimba Range, Mounts Béro, Tétini, and Foko, the Simandou Range (Mts. Tibe and Fon), Loma Mountains, and Tingi Hills in high-altitude grasslands and in gallery forests during the dry season. Ptychadena submascareniensis is another frog species that has been found only on Mt. Nimba and in the Loma Mountains.

== Threats and preservation ==
The landscape has been badly affected by mining on Mount Nimba and general clearance for farming as well as more recent civil war in Sierra Leone and Liberia. Despite its park status iron ore mining on Mount Nimba was still ongoing up until the Liberian Civil War, while the Loma Mountains are perhaps the best preserved part of the region.

=== Protected areas ===
Protected areas include:

- Gueoule and Mont Glo forest reserves, Côte d'Ivoire
- Kounounkan Forest Reserve, Guinea
- Loma Mountains Non-hunting Forest Reserve, Sierra Leone
- Mount Nimba Strict Nature Reserve, Guinea and Côte d'Ivoire (with plans to extend into Liberia)
- Mont Sângbé National Park, Côte d'Ivoire
- Tingi Hills Non-hunting Forest Reserve, Sierra Leone
- Ziama Strict Nature Reserve, Guinea
