= Guinea Highlands =

Mountain in West Africa

Coordinates: 9°30′N 10°00′W

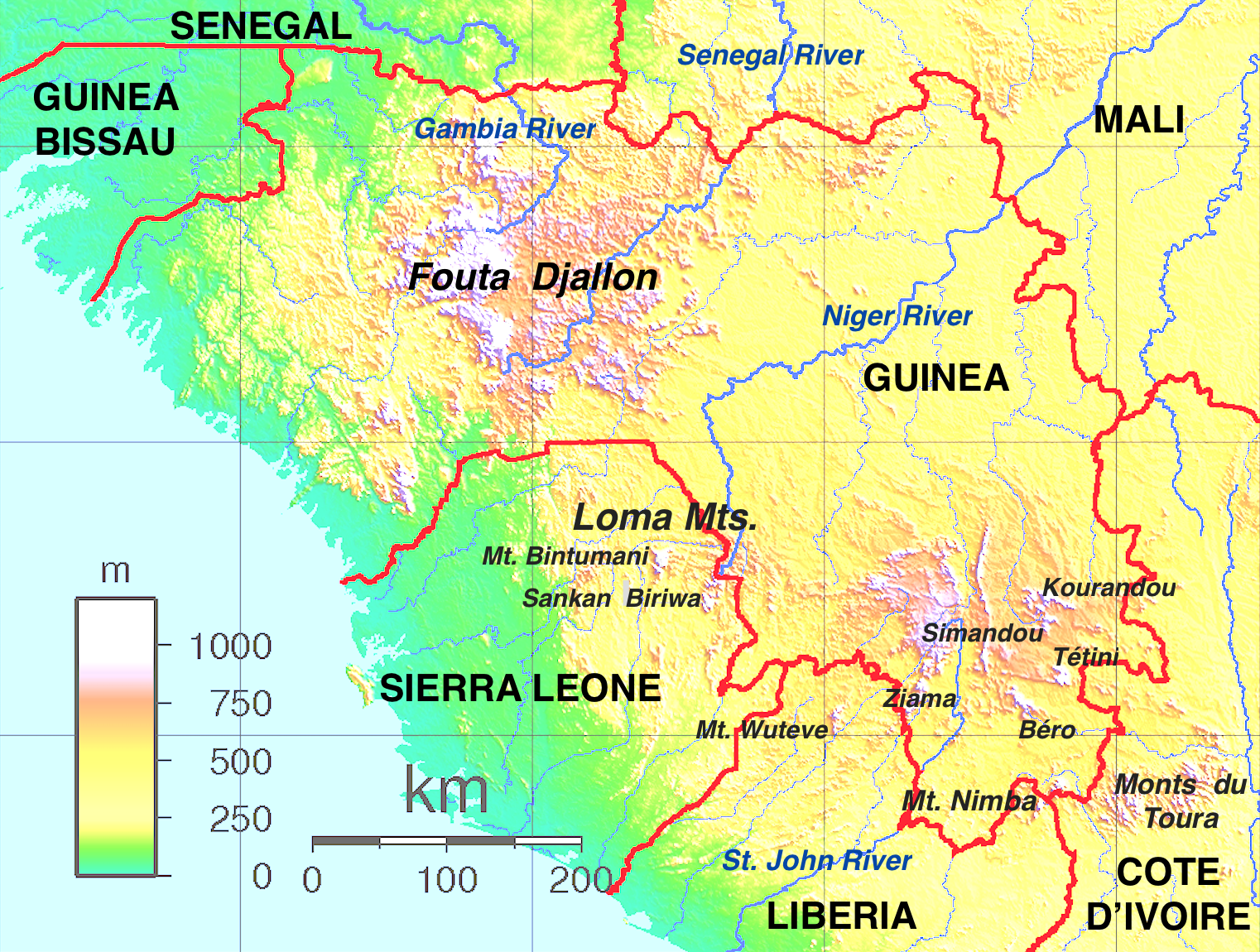
Map of the Guinea Highlands

The Guinea Highlands is a densely forested mountainous plateau extending from central Guinea through northern Sierra Leone and Liberia to western Ivory Coast. The highlands include a number of mountains, ranges and plateaus, including the Fouta Djallon highlands in central Guinea, the Loma Mountains in Sierra Leone, the Simandou and Kourandou massifs in southeastern Guinea, the Nimba Range at the border of Guinea, Liberia, and Ivory Coast, and the Monts du Toura in western Ivory Coast.

== Geography ==
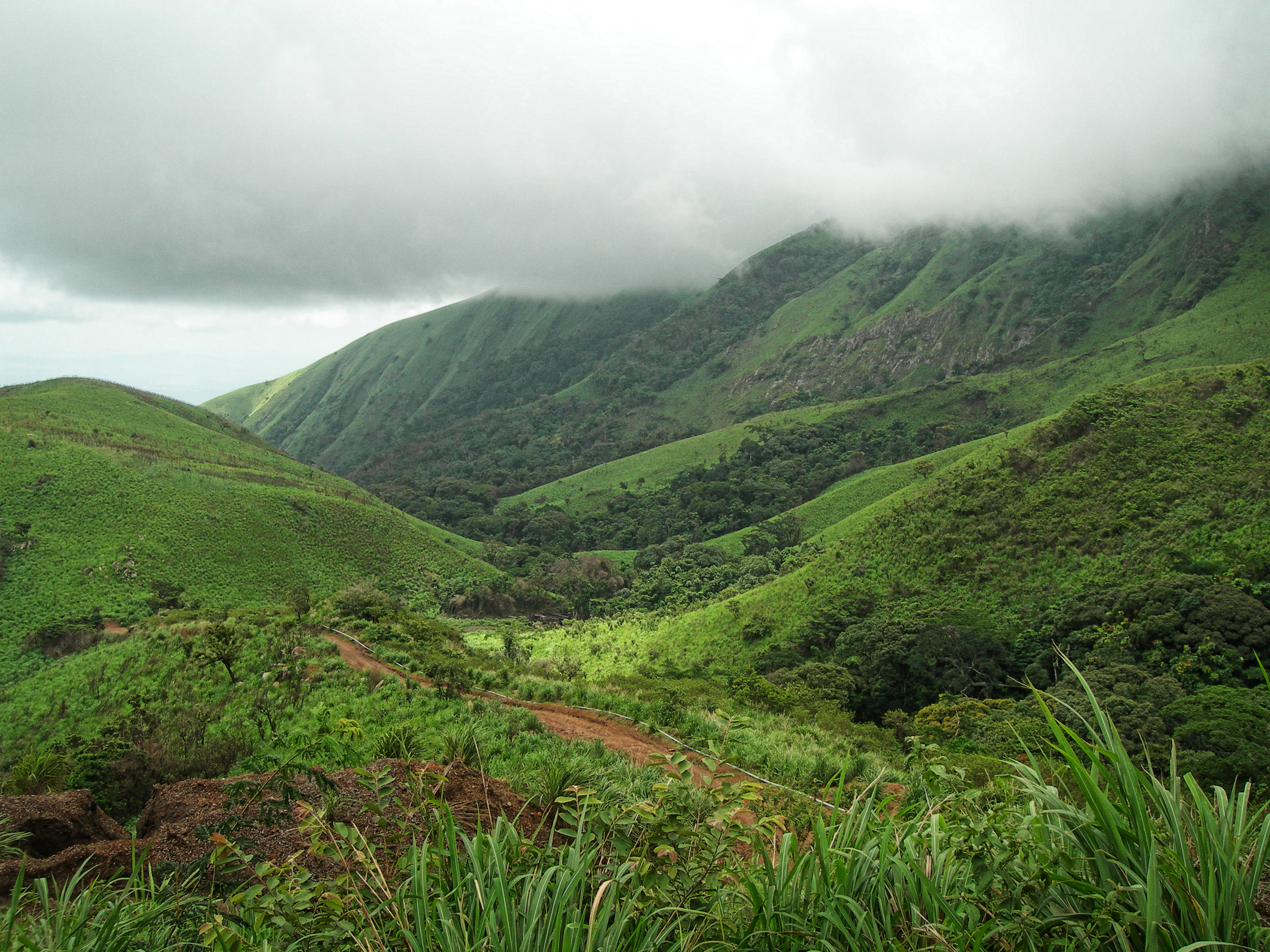
Mount Nimba Strict Nature Reserve

In Guinea they are known as Dorsale Guinéenne. The highest peak in the region is Mount Bintumani in Sierra Leone, at 1,945 metres (6,381 ft). Other peaks include Sankan Biriwa (1,850 metres (6,070 ft)) in Sierra Leone and Mount Richard-Molard (Mount Nimba) (1,752 metres (5,748 ft)) on the border of Guinea and Ivory Coast. The highlands mostly lie between 300 and 500 metres (980 and 1,640 ft) above sea level.

The Guinea Highlands are the source of many of West Africa's rivers, including the Niger River, West Africa's longest river, the Senegal and Gambia rivers, and the rivers of Sierra Leone, Liberia, Maritime Guinea, and western Ivory Coast.

== Geology ==
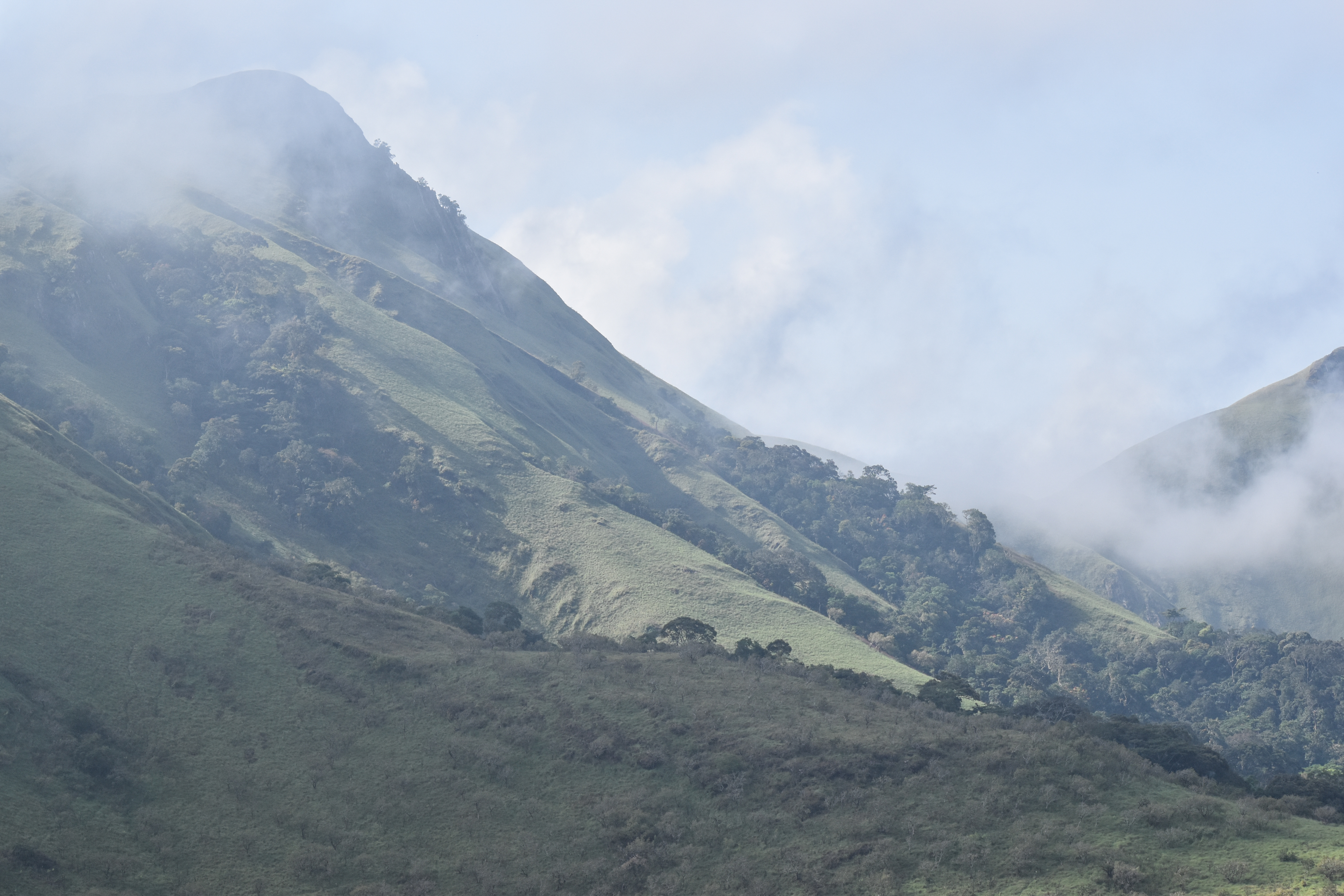
Nimba Mountain Nature Reserve in the Nimba Range, which is a mountain range in the Guinea Highlands.

Geologically the composition of the sediments in the highlands are the same as in Upper Guinea and include granites, schists, and quartzites.

== Ecology ==
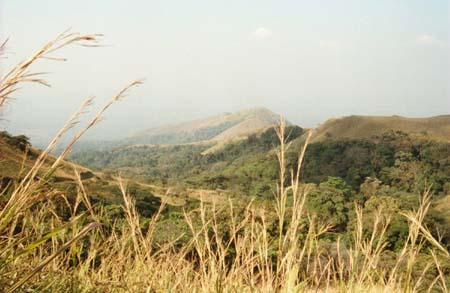
Landscape in the neighbourhood of Mount Nimba, Guinea

The Guinea Highlands form the transition between the Western Guinean lowland forests, moist tropical rainforests that lie to the south between the Guinea Highlands and the Atlantic Ocean, and the Guinean forest-savanna mosaic to the north.

The Guinean montane forests ecoregion covers the portion of the highlands above 600 meters elevation. It includes montane forests, grasslands, and savannas, with a distinct flora and fauna from the surrounding lowlands.

== People ==
Yomou is the chief market town for the densely forested region of the Guinea Highlands. Main commodities sold in the town include rice, cassava, coffee, palm oil and kernels. The region is mainly inhabited by the Guerze (Kpelle) and Mano (Manon) peoples.

== Peaks ==
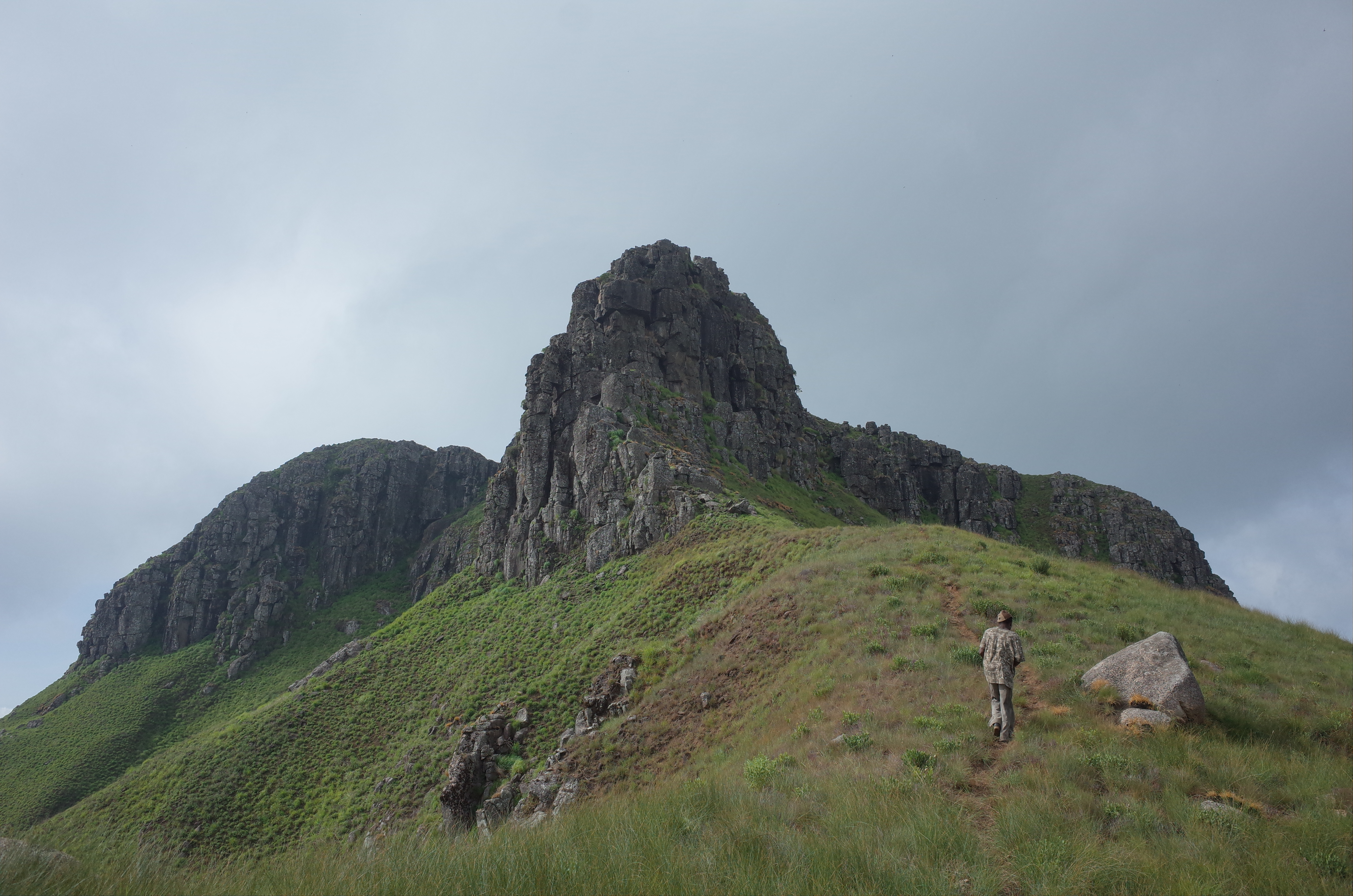
Mount Bintumani (1945 m).

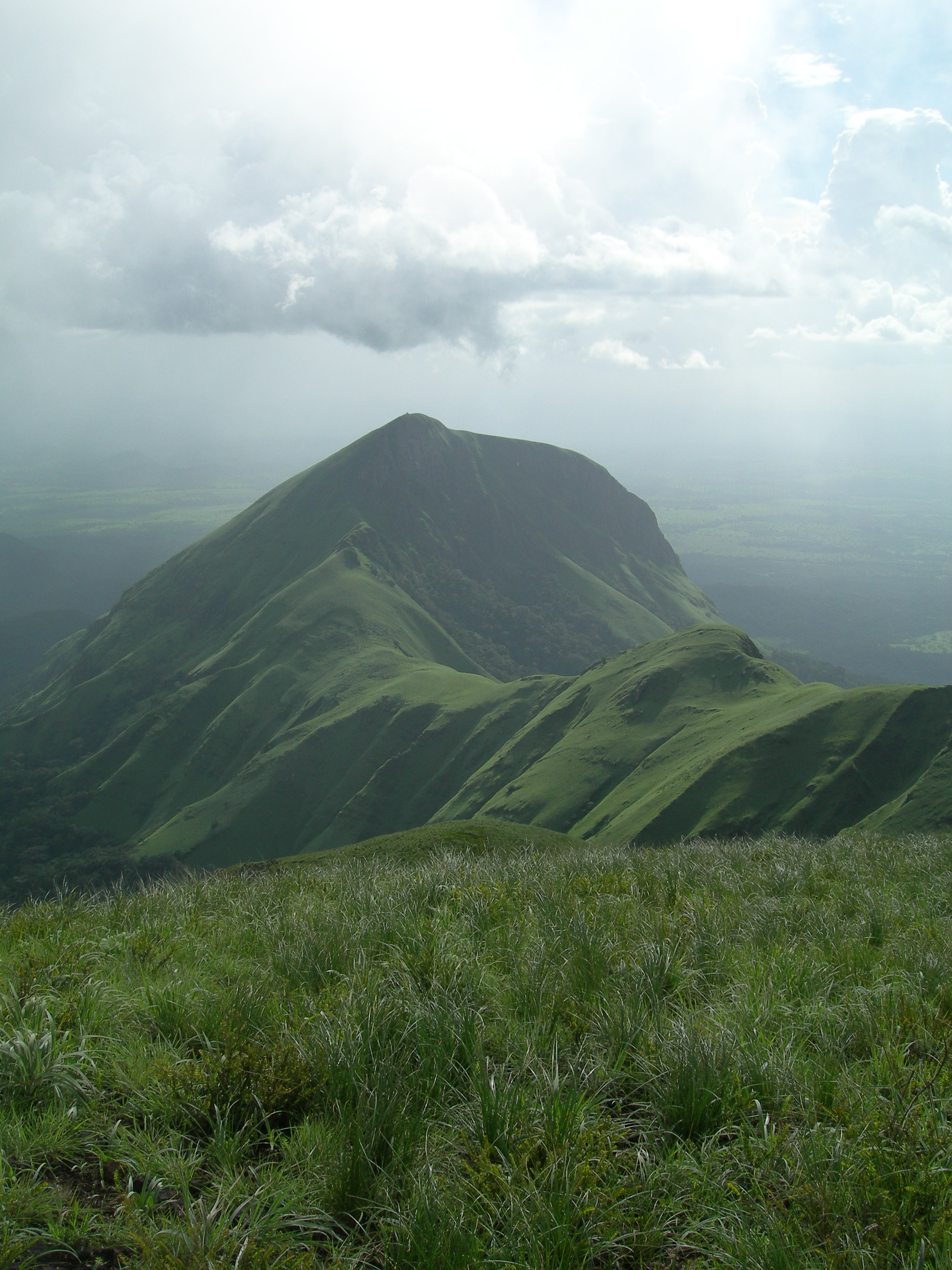
Mount Nimba (1752 m), which is also known as Mount Richard-Molard.

- Mount Bintumani (Loma Mansa), Sierra Leone, 1945 meters (6381 feet)
- Sankan Biriwa, Sierra Leone, 1,850 metres (6,070 ft)
- Mount Richard-Molard, also known as Mount Nimba, Ivory Coast and Guinea, 1752 meters (5748 feet)
- Grand Rochers, Guinea, 1694 meters (5558 feet)
- Mont Sempéré, Guinea, 1682 meters (5518 feet)
- Mont Tô, Guinea, 1675 meters (5495 feet)
- Mont Piérré Richaud, Guinea, 1670 meters (5479 feet)
- Pic de Fon, Guinea, 1658 meters (5440 feet)
- Mont LeClerc, Guinea, 1577 meters (5174 feet)
- Pic de Tibé, Guinea, 1504 meters (4934 feet)
- Mount Wuteve, Liberia, 1420 meters (4659 feet)
- Pic de Tétini, Guinea 1257 meters
- Kourandou Massif, Guinea, 1236 meters
- Béro Massif, Guinea, 1210 meters
