= List of protected areas of Sierra Leone =

This is a list of protected areas of Sierra Leone, including national parks, game reserves, conservation areas, wetlands, and those that are listed as proposed protected areas in the UN Environment Programme World Conservation Monitoring Centre (UNEP WCM) database.

== Forest reserves ==
Name	Status	Area (km^{2})
Bojeni Hills	Designated	7.38
Dodo Hills	Designated	21.8
Fabina	Designated	3.82
Farangbaia	Designated	12.60
Freetown Water Works	Designated	11.34
Gboi Hills	Designated	2.07
Gola East	Designated (amalgamated into Gola Rainforest National Park in 2010)	228.00
Gola West	Designated (amalgamated into Gola Rainforest National Park in 2010)	62.00
Golamo South	Designated	11.60
Gori Hills	Designated	79.40
John Obey	Designated	2.07
Kambui Hills	Designated	143.35
Kambui North	Designated	203.48
Kambui South	Designated	8.80
Kandesuri	Designated	59.57
Kasewe	Designated	12.24
Kent Extension	Designated	6.44
Kuru Hills	Designated	69.93
Lalay	Designated	4.76
Leicester Peak	Designated	0.52
Lhei Hills	Designated	1.55
Malal Hills	Designated	3.39
Matete	Designated	8.50
Moku Hill	Designated	1.46
Moyamba Hills	Designated	1.89
Nimini South	Designated	25.90
No. 2 River	Designated	6.99
Occra Hills	Designated	2.48
Peninsula	Designated	178.00
Port Loko	Designated	2.16
Singamba	Designated	2.99
Sipende	Designated	8.29
Tabe	Designated	3.25
Tama	Designated	170.00
Tobi	Designated	16.71
Tonkoli	Designated	71.04
Wara Wara Hills	Designated	10.41
Waterloo	Designated	0.85

== Game reserves ==
Name	Status	Area (km^{2})
Bagru-Moteva Creeks	Proposed	50.00
Bumpe Mangrove Swamp	Proposed	49.21
Kagboro Creek (Yawri Bay)	Proposed	50.00
Kpaka-Pujehun	Proposed	25.00
Sewa-Waanje	Proposed	100.00

== Game sanctuaries ==
Name	Status	Area (km^{2})
Bo Plains	Proposed	25.90
Tiwai Island	Designated	12.00

== National parks ==
Name	Status	Area (km^{2})
Gola Rainforest National Park	Designatured	710.70
Kuru Hills	Proposed	69.93
Lake Mape/Mabesi	Proposed	75.11
Lake Sonfon	Proposed	51.80
Loma Mountains	Proposed	332.01
Outamba-Kilimi	Designated	808.13
Western Area Peninsula National Park	Designated	183.37

== Non-hunting forest reserves ==
Name	Status	Area (km^{2})
Kangari Hills	Designated	85.73
Loma Mountains	Designated	332.01
Tingi Hills (Sankan Biriwa)	Designated	118.85
Western Area	Designated	176.88

== Strict nature reserves ==
Name	Status	Area (km^{2})
Bonthe Mangrove Swamp	Proposed	998.54
Gola (West) Forest	Proposed	62.00
Gola North	Proposed	40.00
Mamunta-Mayoso Sanctuary	Proposed	20.72
Mogbai (Gola North) (proposed)	Proposed	
Port Loko Plains	Proposed	25.90
Sulima Mangrove Swamp	Proposed	25.90
Wemago (Gola East)	Proposed	35.00
Yelibuya Island	Proposed	38.85

== Wetlands of international importance (Ramsar) ==
Name	Status	Area (km^{2})
Sierra Leone River Estuary		2950.00

Marine Protected Areas (MPAs)

Name	Status	Area (km^{2})	Description
Yawri Bay	Designated		
Sherbro River Estuary	Designated		
Sierra Leone River Estuary	Designated		
Scarcies River Estuary	Designated	694	The Scarcies River Estuary MPA is located in Northern Sierra Leone and comprises the Great and Little Scarcies which merge at the mouth before emptying into the Atlantic Ocean. The MPA consists of both marine and intertidal zones and it is a partially regulated MPA. Four clusters of community management associations have been designated to manage the MPAs. Restricted fishing is allowed using hook and line and bottom set gillnet fishing. The use of monofilament fishing net is prohibited.
