= Mount Wuteve =

Mountain in Liberia

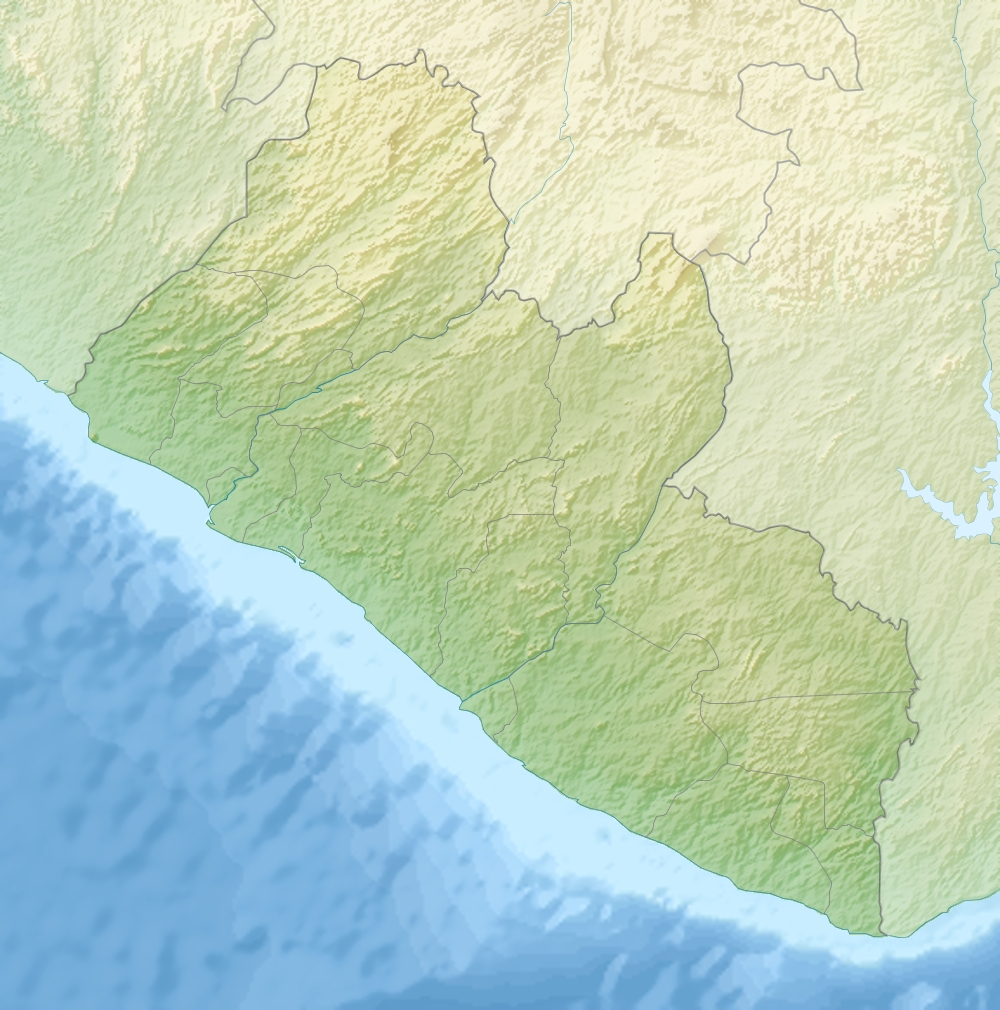
- Location within Liberia

Highest point
- Elevation: 1,447 m (4,747 ft)
- Listing: Country high point
- Coordinates: 8°08′45″N 9°55′30″W

Geography
- Location: Liberia
- Parent range: Guinea Highlands

Mount Wuteve, also known as Mount Wologizi, is a mountain located in Liberia, whose summit is the highest point in Liberia.

== Geography ==
The mountain is located in the Guinea Highlands range. Data from the Shuttle Radar Topography Mission revealed that the summit is higher in elevation than the previously quoted 1,380 meters. As of 2024, the elevation is understood to be 1,447 meters. The Wuteve or Wologizi ridge, including several other associated peaks, extends for 22 km with spurs of up to 5 km on each side. The slopes are steep, forming cliffs up to 100 m high in places.

=== Environment ===
The lower slopes are covered with open forest characterised by Lophira, Pycnanthus, Tarrietia, Albizia, Samanea and Cryptosepalum tree species. With increasing elevation, forest height decreases and the understorey denser. Above 1,000 m the dominant trees—Parinari and Ouratea species—are stunted. The foothills are surrounded by areas of savanna woodland.

The massif has been designated an Important Bird Area (IBA) by BirdLife International because it supports significant populations of many bird species. Forest elephants and western chimpanzees are present.
