= Chankiri =

Chankiri may be:

- the Khmer name of Samanea saman, a species of tree
- an alternative Anglicisation of the name of Çankırı, a city in Turkey
