= Sankan Biriwa (Tingi Hills) No Or Non Hunting Forest Reserve =

Sankan Biriwa (Tingi Hills) No or Non - Hunting Forest Reserve
- IUCN category IV (habitat/species management area)

The Sankan Biriwa (Tingi Hills) No or Non - Hunting Forest Reserve is found in Sierra Leone. It was established in 1947. This site is 118 km^{2}.

== General Information ==
The reserve is located on the easternmost end of the mountain range in Sierra Leone, close to the eastern border with the Republic of Guinea. The highest point is the Sankan Biriwa massif, on which there are two peaks separated by a narrow gorge. Both peaks rise above 1,800m. The northernmost peak is the second-highest peak in the country at 1,850m. This massif is the source of tributaries for two major rivers, the Sewa River and the Mano. The vegetation consists of forest-savanna mosaic from 305m - 915m elevation, shrub-savanna on the plateau at 915m – 1,650m and montane grassland above 1,680m. Gallery forest occurs along the river tributaries at 450m – 915m and rises up to 1,375m in places.
