= Kasewe Forest Reserve =

Coordinates: 8°18′53″N 12°15′43″W

Kasewe Forest Reserve is an area of hills in the Moyamba District of Sierra Leone . It is designated as a forest reserve and contains moist semi-deciduous and evergreen forests that cover an area of 1.224 km^{2}. Made up of volcanic rock the hills stand about 500m above the interior plains of the country. The nearest town is Lunsar.

Despite the lack of credible data on the biodiversity of this forest reserve, it is still believed that a significant number of endangered mammal species live in it. It is also known that the reserve suffers great consequences from the huge deforestation.

== See also ==
Protected areas of Sierra Leone
