= Losari =

Losari may refer to:

- Losari, Brebes
- Losari, Cirebon
