= Western Area Peninsula National Park =

National park in Sierra Leone

Coordinates: 8°20′26″N 13°9′28″W

- Western Area Peninsula Forest National Park
- IUCN category II (national park)
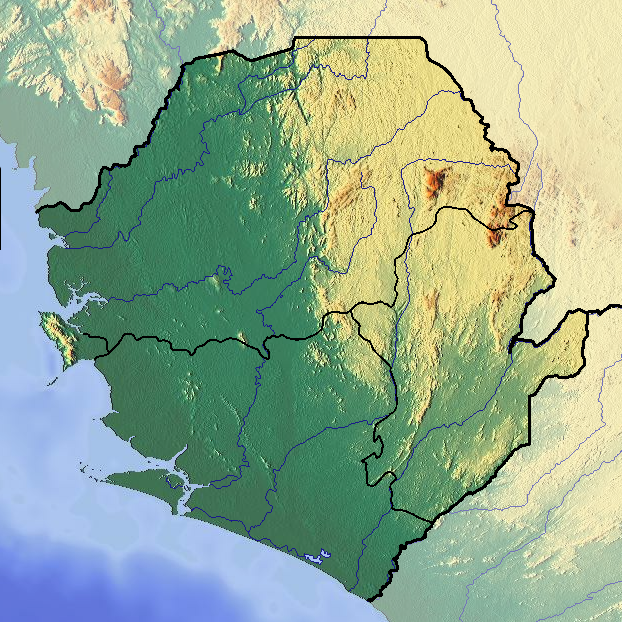
- Location within Sierra Leone
- Location: Freetown Peninsula
- Nearest city: Freetown
- Area: 18,337 ha (70.80 sq mi)
- Created: 1916
- Established: 2012

Western Area Peninsula National Park is a protected area in Sierra Leone. It covers an area of 183.37 km^{2}.

== History ==
The area became a forest reserve in 1916 and had an area of 17,688 hectares (68.29 mi^{2}). It was demarcated by Charles Lane Poole, Sierra Leone's first ever "Conservator of Forests", and founder of the Sierra Leonean Forestry Department.

It became a national park in 2012. The Government of Sierra Leone has published the "Statutory Instrument, Supplement to the Sierra Leone Gazette Vol. CXLIII, No.69 dated 29 November 2012, Proclamation For the Constitution of the Western Area Peninsula National Park" (available in hardcopy only in the Government Bookshop Freetown) according to the boundaries defined by the WAPFoR Project. Furthermore, UNESCO has accepted the Western Area Peninsula National Park's application as tentative site as UNESCO World Heritage together with Tiwai Island and Gola Forest National Park.

== Environment ==
It is the westernmost semi-deciduous closed canopy forest in Sierra Leone. The forest is home to various endangered species, including a wide variety of endangered birds and three species of duiker. The park has been designated an Important Bird Area (IBA) by BirdLife International because it supports significant populations of many bird species.

Despite its protected status, the reserve has suffered from continuous deforestation, predominantly due to urban encroachment and related activities, a trend only exacerbated by the civil war.

A detailed deforestation study with a subsequent re-demarcation proposal has been conducted by the WAPFoR project.

== Tacugama Chimpanzee Sanctuary ==
The Reserve is home to the Tacugama Chimpanzee Sanctuary which was founded in 1995 by Bala Amarasekaran, seven years after he and his wife Sharmila saw a baby chimpanzee for sale by the roadside north of the capital Freetown. The couple bought the chimpanzee for $30 and soon discovered that many other chimpanzees are kept as pets and often mistreated. The sanctuary cares for these abused, orphaned and abandoned animals and offers them a new home, and as capacity becomes stretched, also educates among Sierra Leoneans about protecting chimpanzees in the wild. More than 2,000 local rural school children visit the 100-acre (40 ha) site every year.

== See also ==
- Protected areas of Sierra Leone
