= Kangari Hills Forest Reserve =

Protected area in Sierra Leone

- IUCN category VI (protected area with sustainable use of natural resources)
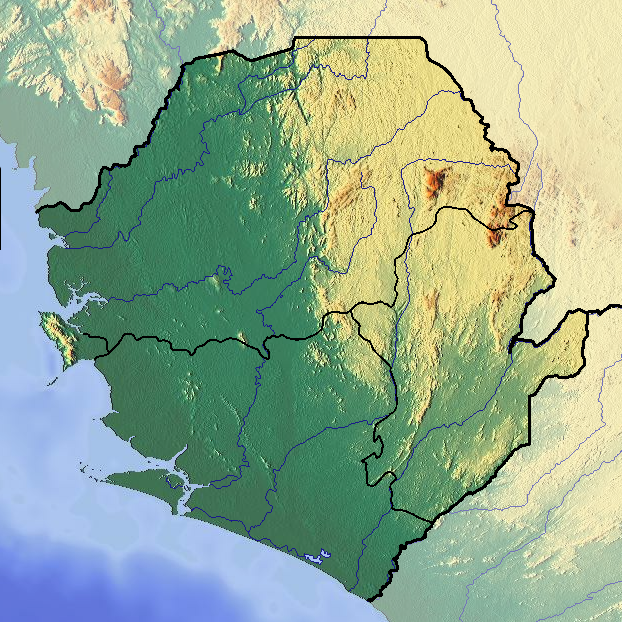
- Location within Sierra Leone
- Location: Sierra Leone
- Coordinates: 8.39834°N 11.61598°W
- Area: 85.73 km^{2} (33.10 sq mi)
- Established: 1924

Kangari Hills Forest Reserve is a non-hunting forest reserve in the centre of Sierra Leone, partly in Tonkolili District and partly in Bo District. The area became a forest reserve in 1924. Standing between 200 and 600 m above sea level, the reserve has an area of 8,573 ha (21,180 acres), although parts of it area have been encroached upon by farming and mining activities.

== Environment ==
At elevations of 300–600 m, the vegetation of the hills is mostly closed forest, with secondary forest and bush fallow lower down. The reserve has been designated an Important Bird Area (IBA) by BirdLife International because it supports significant populations of many bird species. Primates found in the hills are western chimpanzees, western red and king colobuses, sooty mangabeys and Diana monkeys. Other mammals present include African forest elephants, water chevrotains and black duikers. The reserve is one of the few places in Sierra Leone where the endangered forest elephant survives.

== See also ==
- Protected areas of Sierra Leone
