= Farangbaia Forest Reserve =

Coordinates: 8°57′59″N 11°45′28″W

Farangbaia Forest Reserve is a forest reserve with a rainforest ecosystem in Sierra Leone. The Reserve covers an area of 1,260 hectares, is located approximately 10 km to the south-east of the town of Bumbuna and forms part of the catchment area for the Seli River. Since the outbreak of Sierra Leone civil war in 1991 much of the reserve has become farmland and bush forest and there a number sawmills operating there.

== See also ==
Protected areas of Sierra Leone
