= Bo Plains =

Coordinates: 7°55′00″N 11°47′00″W

The Bo Plains are located in the south of Sierra Leone by the city of Bo. The plains are mainly made up of savannah and 2,590 hectares of the area have been proposed as a game sanctuary.

== See also ==
Protected areas of Sierra Leone
