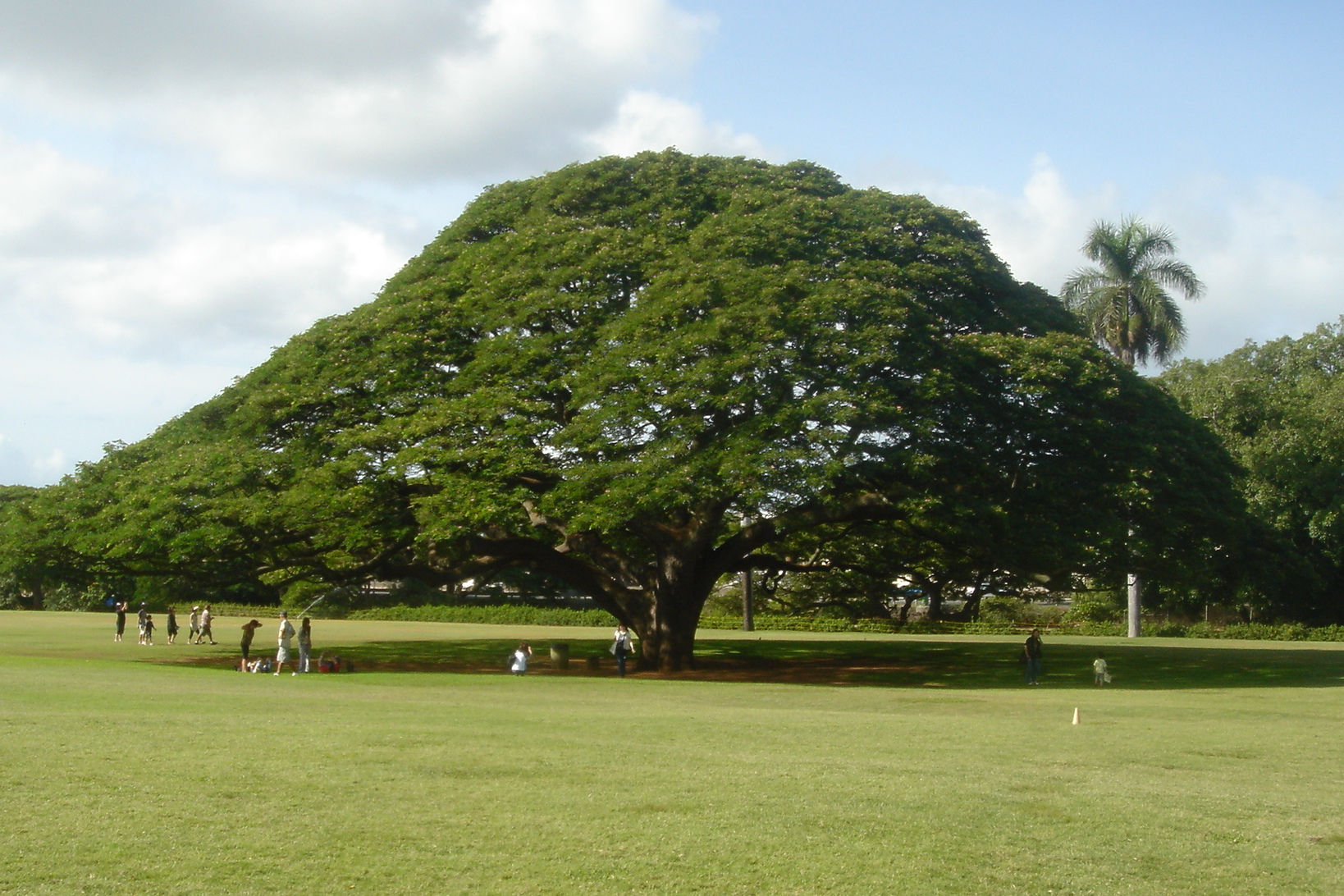
- The Hitachi Tree at the Moanalua Gardens, Hawaii

Conservation status
- Least Concern (IUCN 3.1)

- Secure (NatureServe)

Scientific classification
- Kingdom: Plantae
- Clade: Tracheophytes
- Clade: Angiosperms
- Clade: Eudicots
- Clade: Rosids
- Order: Fabales
- Family: Fabaceae
- Subfamily: Caesalpinioideae
- Clade: Mimosoid clade
- Genus: Samanea
- Species: S. saman

Binomial name
- Samanea saman (Jacq.) Merr.

Synonyms
- List: Acacia propinqua A.Rich.; Albizia saman (Jacq.) F.Muell.; Albizzia saman (Jacq.) Merr.; Calliandra saman (Jacq.) Griseb.; Enterolobium saman (Jacq.) Prain; Feuilleea saman (Jacq.) Kuntze; Inga cinerea Willd.; Inga salutaris Kunth; Inga saman (Jacq.) Willd.; Mimosa pubifera Poir.; Mimosa saman Jacq.; Pithecellobium cinereum Benth.; Pithecellobium saman (Jacq.) Benth.; Pithecolobium saman (Jacq.) Benth. [Spelling variant]; Samanea saman (Jacq.) Merr.; Zygia saman (Jacq.) A.Lyons

= Samanea saman =

Species of legume

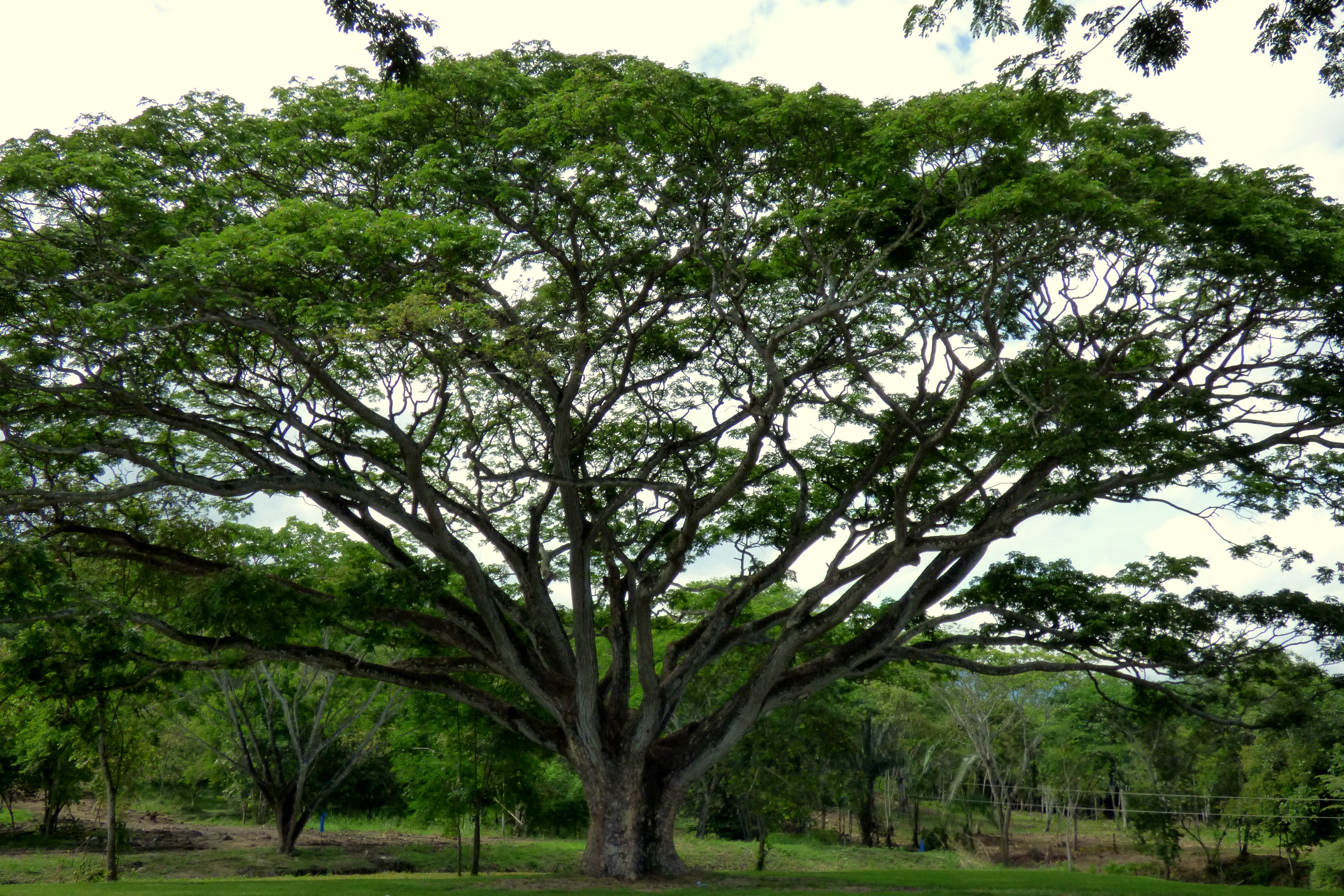
A Chankiri Tree, otherwise known as Rain tree

Samanea saman is a semi-deciduous species of flowering tree in the pea family, Fabaceae, now in the Mimosoid clade and is native to Central and South America. It is often placed in the genus Samanea, which by yet other authors is subsumed in Albizia entirely.

Its range extends from Mexico south to Peru and Brazil, but it has been widely introduced to South and Southeast Asia, as well as the Pacific Islands, including Hawaii. It is a well-known tree, rivaled perhaps only by lebbeck and pink siris among its genus. It is well represented in many languages and has numerous local names in its native range; common English names include saman, rain tree and monkeypod (see also § Names below).

In Cambodia it is colloquially known as the Chankiri Tree (can be written ចន្ទគិរី or ចន្ទ៍គីរី).

== Description ==
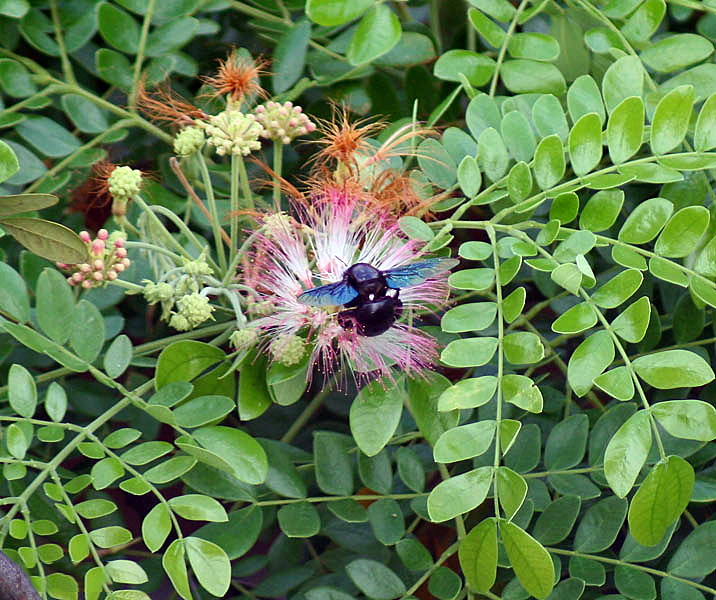
Pink-flowers being pollinated by a black carpenter bee, in Kolkata

=== Tree ===
Saman is a wide-canopied tree with a large symmetrical umbrella-shaped crown. It usually reaches a height of 15–25 m (49–82 ft) and a diameter of 30 m (98 ft).

This species of flowering tree in the Fabaceae family is native to Central and South America but has been widely introduced across the tropics, especially South and Southeast Asia.

Its branches have velvety and hairy bark. Large branches of the tree tend to break off, particularly during rainstorms. This can be hazardous as the tree is very commonly used for avenue plantation.

A rain tree leaf is pinnate made of 6–16 leaflets, each leaflet is shaped like a diamond 2–4 centimetres (0.79–1.57 in) long and 1–2 centimetres (0.39–0.79 in) wide with a dull top surface and finely hairy beneath. The tree sheds its leaves for a while during dry periods. Its crown is big and can provide shade, but allows rain to fall through into the ground beneath it.

The leaves fold in rainy weather and in the evenings, hence the names rain tree and five o'clock tree.

=== Flowers and seeds ===
The tree has pinkish flowers with white and red stamens, set on heads with around 12–25 flowers per head. These heads may number in the thousands, covering the whole tree.

The seed pods of the tree are curved and leathery; they contain sticky, edible flesh covering the flat, oval seeds.

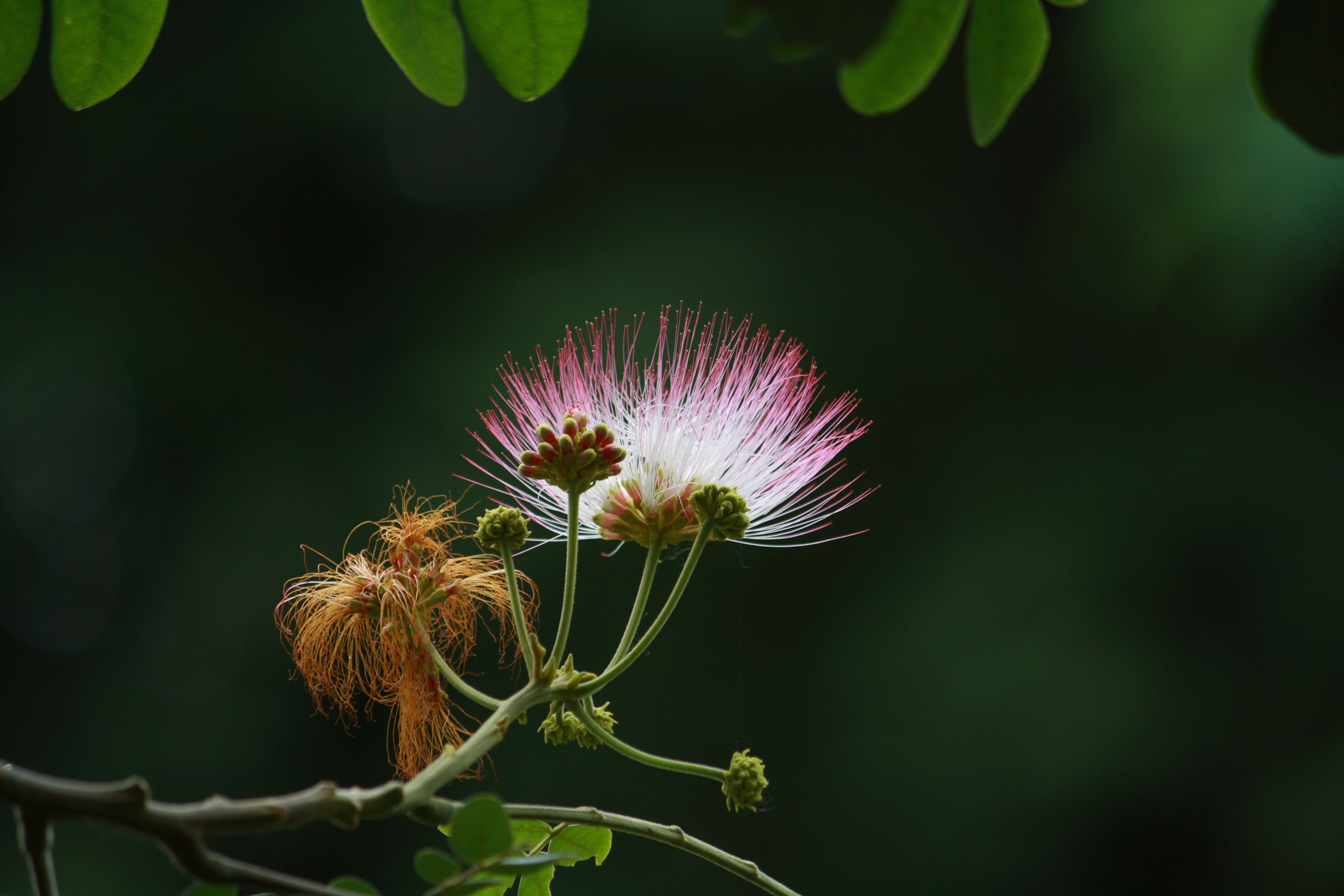
Flower

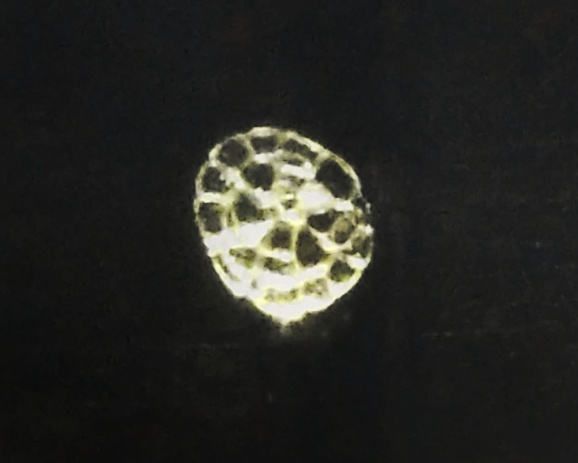
A pollen grain

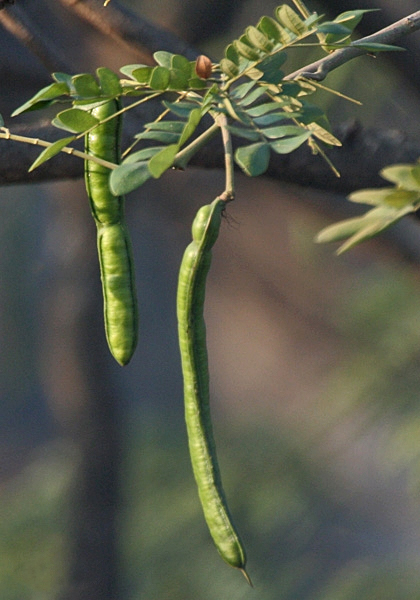
Pods

== Names ==
In English, it is usually known as rain tree or saman. It is also known as "monkey pod", "giant thibet", "inga saman", (Note: It is a rather close relative to the ingas.) "cow tamarind", East Indian walnut, (Note: It is not at all closely related to walnuts.) "soar", or "suar". In English-speaking regions of the Caribbean, it is known as coco tamarind in Grenada; French tamarind in Guyana; and samaan tree in Trinidad. In Philippine English, it is confusingly simply known as "acacia", due to its resemblance to native Acacia species.

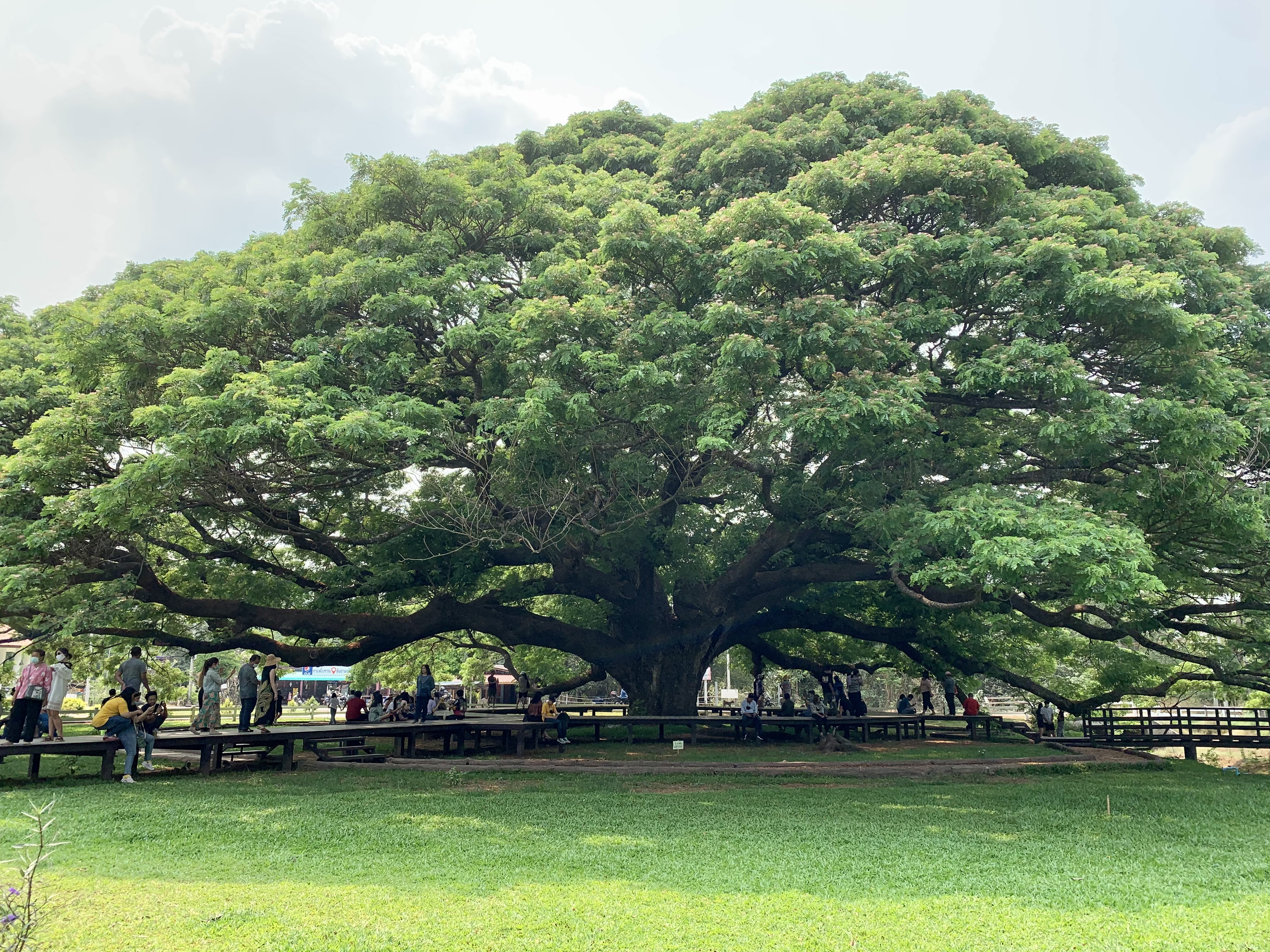
A giant specimen near Kanchanaburi, Thailand, known locally as chamchuri-yak (จามจุรียักษ์). "Chamchuri" is the Thai name of the tree species, whereas "yak" is the Thai pronunciation of yaksha, a mythical demon, referring in this context to the monstrous size of the tree.

The original name, saman - known in many languages and used for the specific epithet - derives from zamang, meaning "Mimosoideae tree" in some Cariban languages of northern Venezuela. This name is also where its genus name Samanea comes from.

The origin of the name "rain tree" is unknown. It has been variously attributed to local names ki hujan or pokok hujan ('rain tree') in Indonesia and Malaysia because its leaves fold during rainy days (allowing rain to fall through the tree); the way the relative abundance of grass under the tree in comparison to surrounding areas; the steady drizzle of honeydew-like discharge of cicadas feeding on the leaves; the occasional shower of sugary secretions from the nectaries on the leaf petioles; to the shedding of stamens during heavy flowering.

In Latin America, it is variously known as samán, cenízaro, cenicero, genízaro, carreto, carreto negro, delmonte, dormilón, guannegoul, algarrobo del país, algarrobo, campano, carabeli, couji, lara, urero, or zarza in Spanish; and chorona in Portuguese.

In the Pacific Islands, it is known as filinganga in the Northern Marianas; trongkon-mames in Guam; gumorni spanis in Yap; kasia kula or mohemohe in Tonga; marmar in New Guinea; ʻohai in Hawaii; tamalini or tamaligi in Samoa; and vaivai ni vavalangi, vaivai moce or sirsa in Fiji.

In Southeast Asia, it is known as ຕົ້ນສາມສາ (ton sam sa) in Laos, akasya or palo de China in the Philippines; meh or trembesi in Indonesia; pukul lima ("five o'clock tree") in Malaysia and Singapore; ampil barang ("Western tamarind") in Cambodia; ก้ามปู (kampu), ฉำฉา (chamcha), จามจุรีแดง (chamchuri daeng), จามจุรี (chamchuri) in Thai; ကုက္ကို (kokko) in Myanmar; and còng, muồng tím, or cây mưa ("rain tree") in Vietnam.

== Use ==
The edible fruit pulp can be made into a beverage that tastes like lemons; the pulp is also an additive to gasoline.

Its wood shows high chatoyance, and it is used for carving and making furniture.

The "Samanea saman" tree is one of several types of host plants that allows lac insects (Kerria lacca) infestation. The resultant copious sap/insect discharge caused by this insect is a harden material that is subsequently collected and processed into lac/shellac and used in making lacquerware and wood finishes.

== Raintrees around the world ==
=== In Cambodia ===
In Cambodia the Samanea saman is known locally as chankiri (ចន្ទគិរី). It is unclear when and how Chankiri was introduced to Cambodia. It is possible the tree was introduced from Brazil by the French in the 1920s, together with the rubber tree (Hevea brasiliensis) during the rubber industry's global boom in the early 1900s. It is also possible the tree came from neighboring countries in the region where the plant had been introduced earlier on by Western colonial explorers.

Since its introduction to Cambodia, it has been widely planted across the country thanks to its tall height and expansive branches that can shade large areas, and as an ornamental. The fruit is eaten, and in famine times the young leaves are eaten in salads.

Khmer: ចាមរី, romanized: Chamri the official Khmer name for the plant because the flowers from this tree resemble the beautiful long-haired tail of the chamri (known in English as yak). Ampil barang (French tamarind) is another colloquial name for it in Cambodia.

==== Chankiri Trees in the Killing Fields ====
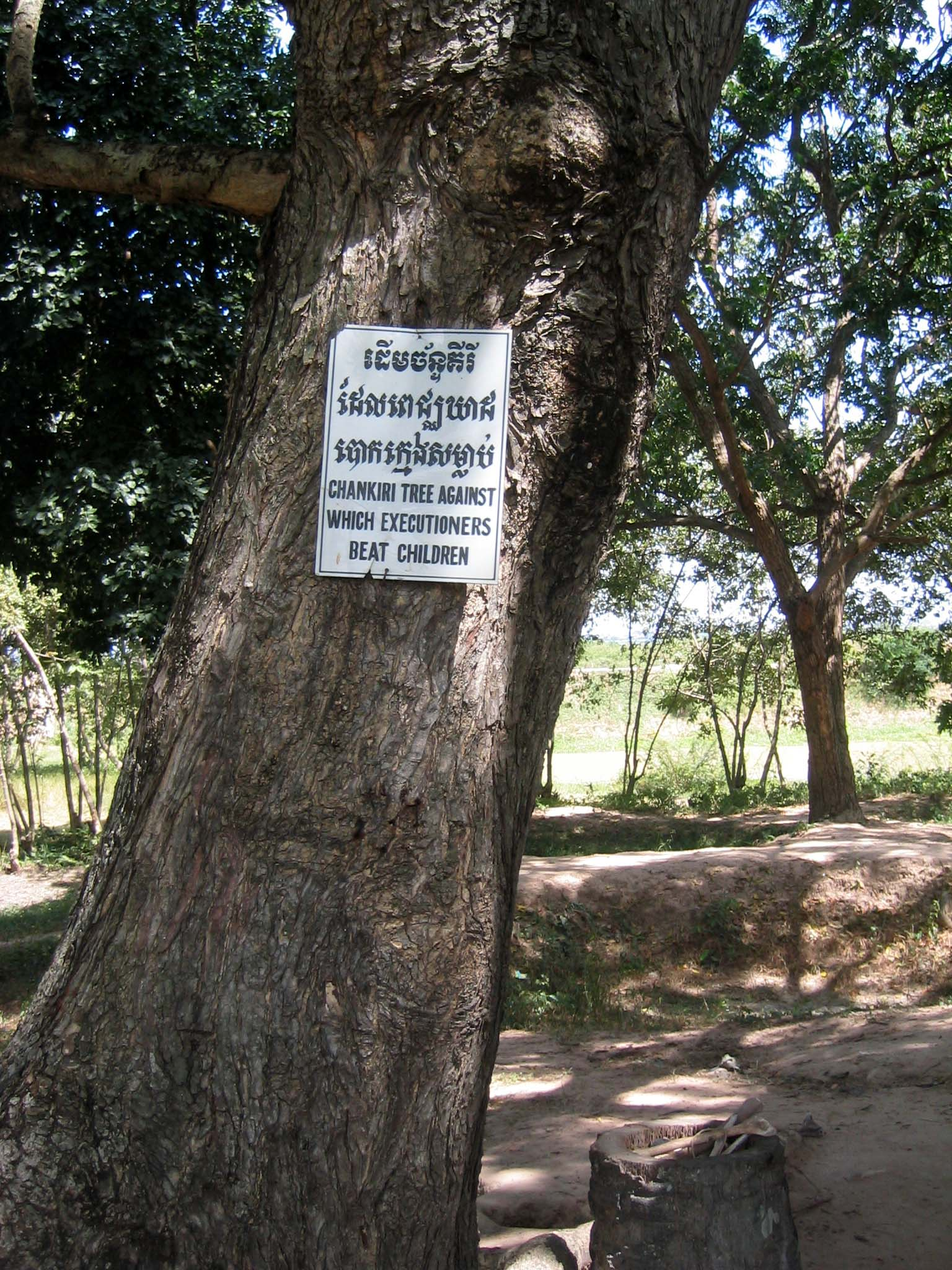
A Chankiri Tree in Cambodia. The sign reads "Chankiri Tree against which executioners beat children"

Multiple chankiri can be found in the Killing Fields, an execution field used by the Khmer Rouge during the Cambodian genocide, though the trees were planted at the field long before. Children and infants with parents accused of crimes against the regime were smashed against trees, so that the children "wouldn't grow up and take revenge for their parents' deaths".

It was a coincidence that the Chankiri tree at the Killing Fields is one of the many trees against which the Khmer Rouge executioners beat young children and there are no specific associations locally between the Chankiri tree and the Khmer Rouge.

=== In Venezuela ===
When Alexander von Humboldt travelled in the Americas from 1799 to 1804, he encountered a giant saman tree near Maracay, Venezuela. He measured the circumference of the parasol-shaped crown at 576 ft (about 180.8 m), (Note: Presuming von Humboldt used the Magdeburg foot of 1755, introduced in Prussia in 1793, which was 1.044 feet (0.318 m) (31.385 cm).) its diameter was around 190 ft (about 59.6 m), on a trunk at 9 ft (about 2.8 m) in diameter and reaching just 60 ft (nearly 19 m) in height. Humboldt mentioned the tree was reported to have changed little since the Spanish colonization of Venezuela; he estimated it to be as old as the famous Canary Islands dragon tree (Dracaena draco) of Icod de los Vinos on Tenerife.

The tree, called Samán de Güere (transcribed Zamang del Guayre by von Humboldt) still stands today, and is a Venezuelan national treasure. Just like the dragon tree on Tenerife, the age of the saman in Venezuela is rather indeterminate. As von Humboldt's report makes clear, according to local tradition, it would be older than 500 years today, which is rather outstanding by the genus' standards. It is certain, however, the tree is much more than 200 years old today, but it is one exceptional individual; even the well-learned von Humboldt could not believe it was actually the same species as the saman trees he knew from the greenhouses at Schönbrunn Castle. A famous specimen called the "Brahmaputra Rain Tree" located at Guwahati on the banks of the Brahmaputra River in Assam, India has the thickest trunk of any Saman; approximately 12 feet (3.7 m) diameter at breast height (DBH). The size of the pollen is around 119 microns and it is polyad of 24 to 32 grains.

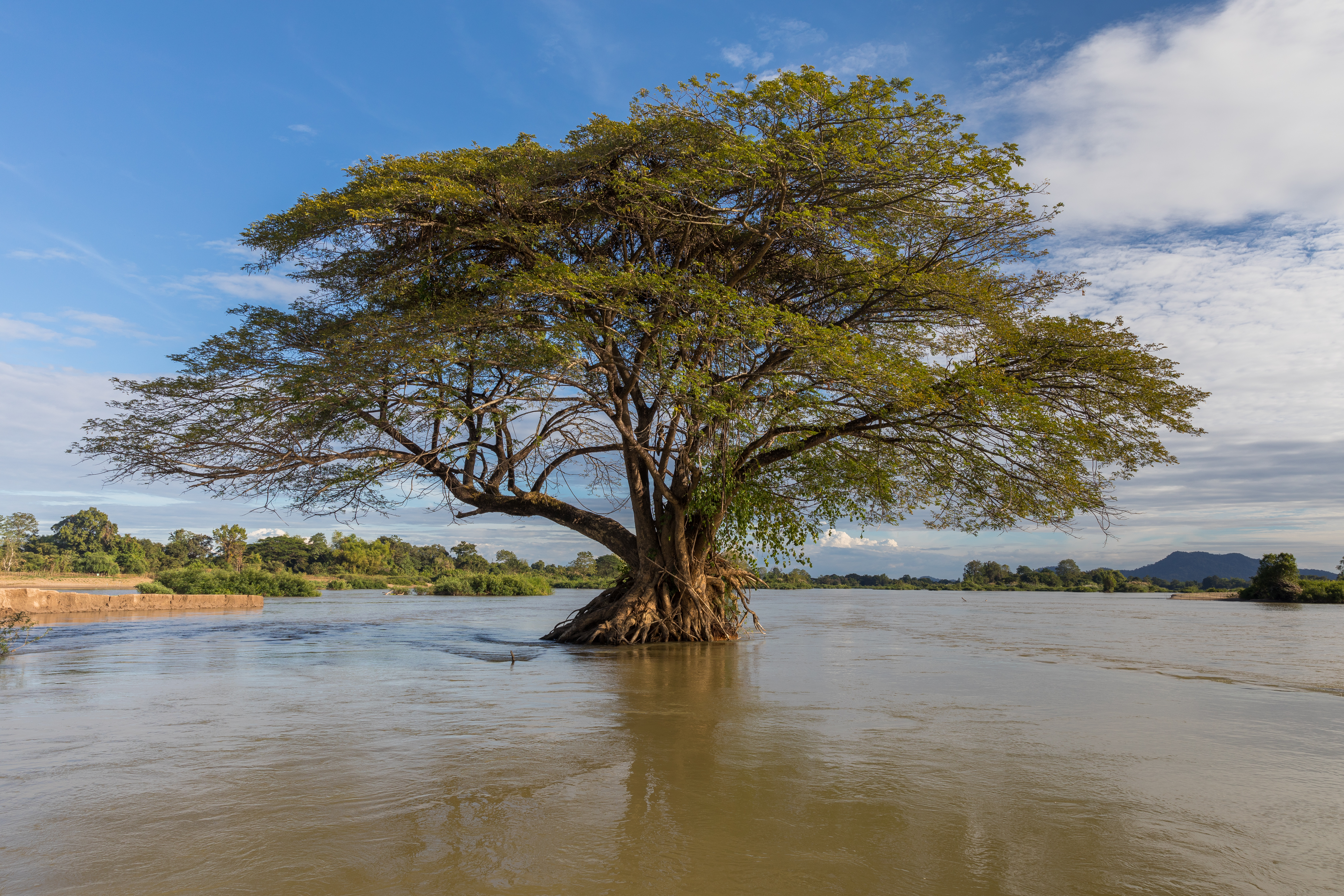
Submerged tree in the Mekong, at Si Phan Don, Laos, during the dry season (when the river is low)

=== Indonesia and carbon sequestration ===
Carbon sequestration is the capture and long-term removal of carbon dioxide from the atmosphere. According to a research conducted at the School of Forestry of the Bogor Agricultural Institute, Indonesia, a mature tree with a crown diameter measuring 15 metres (49 ft) absorbed 28.5 metric tons (28.0 long tons; 31.4 short tons) of CO_{2} annually. The trees have been planted in the Indonesian cities of Kudus and Demak and also will be planted along the shoulder of the road from Semarang to Losari.

== Gallery ==
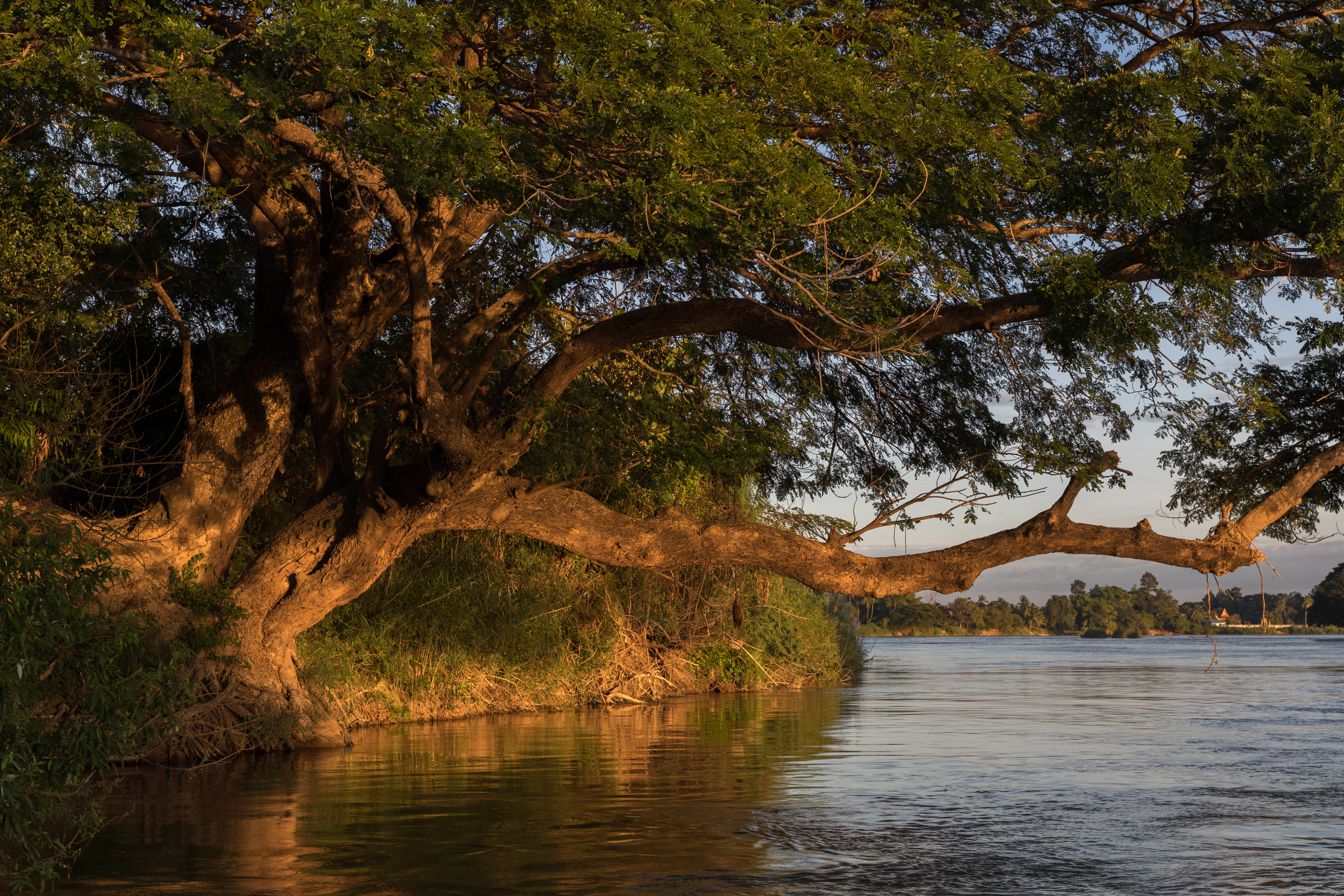
Si Phan Don, Laos

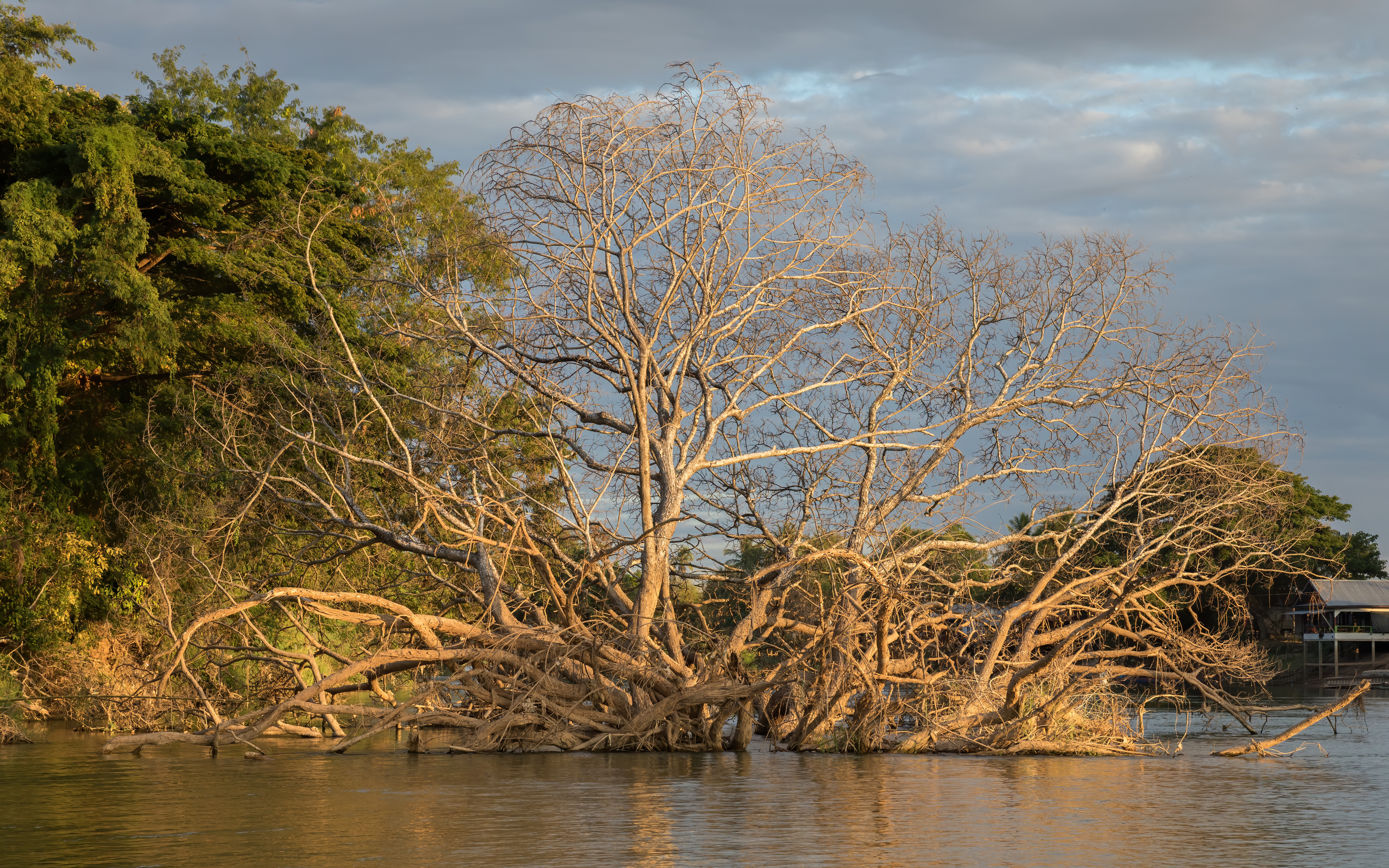
Roots fallen into the water of the Mekong in Don Det

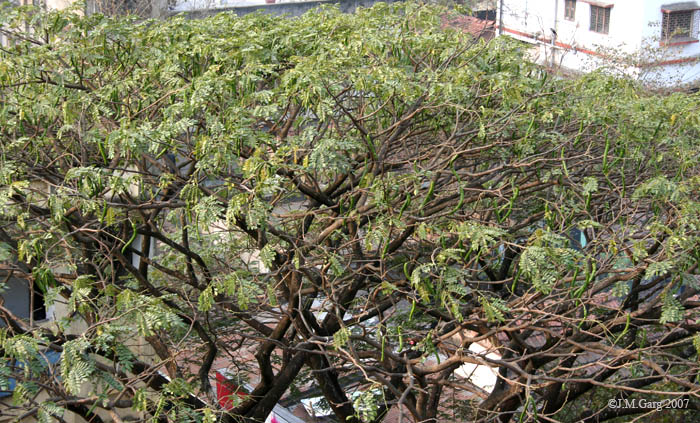
Falling leaves in Kolkata, West Bengal

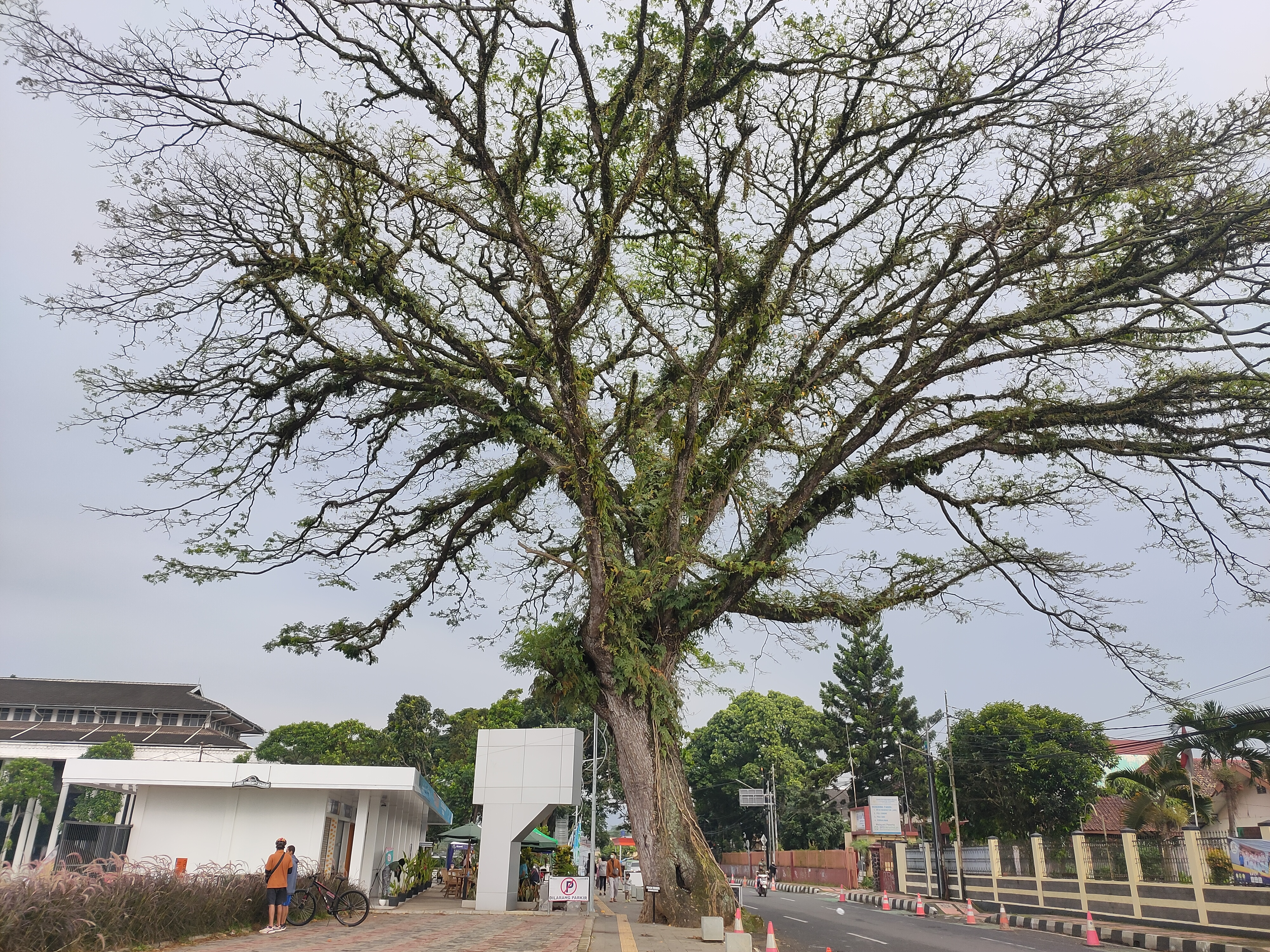
Sukabumi, West Java

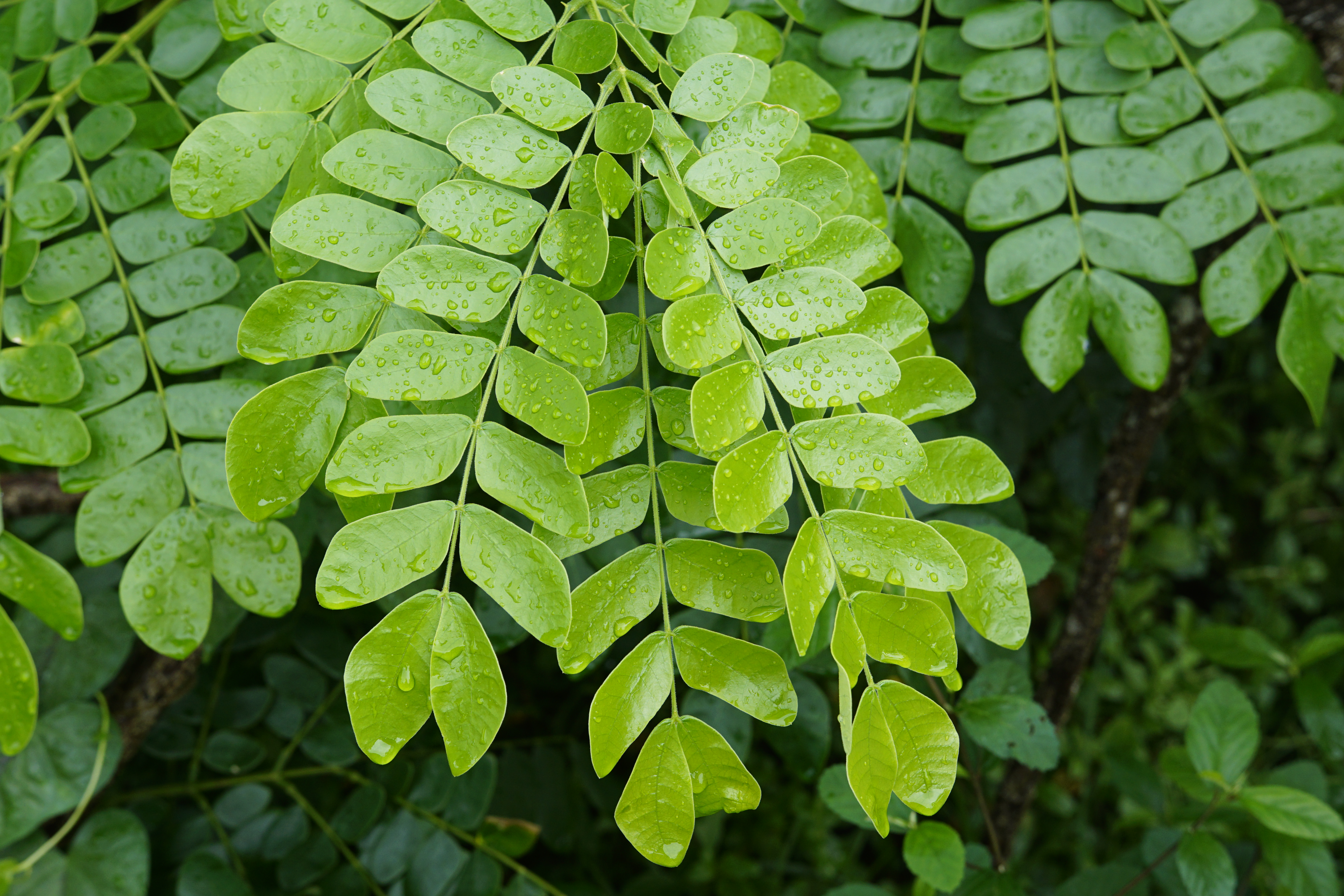
Detail of the leaves

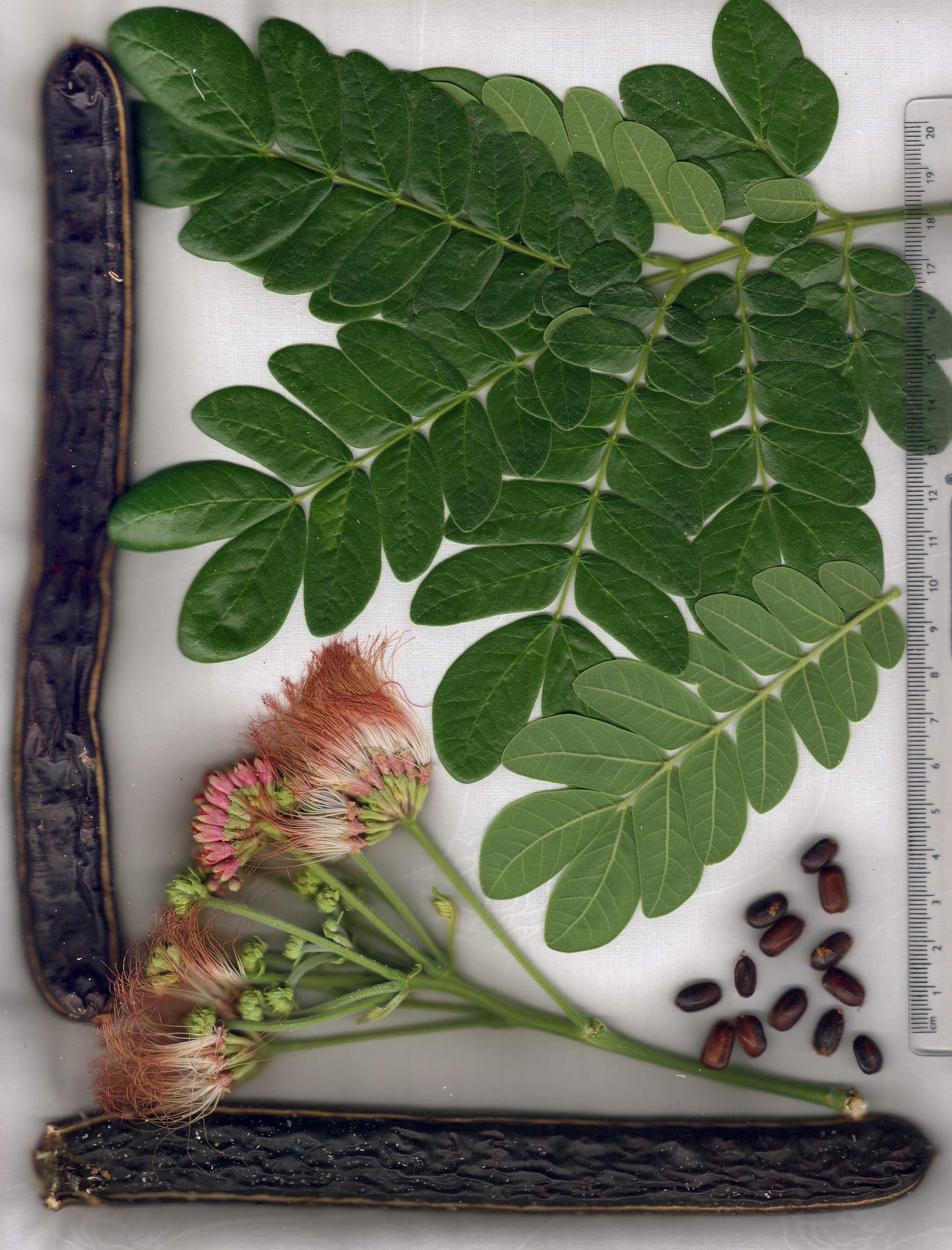
Leaves, flowers, dried pods, seeds

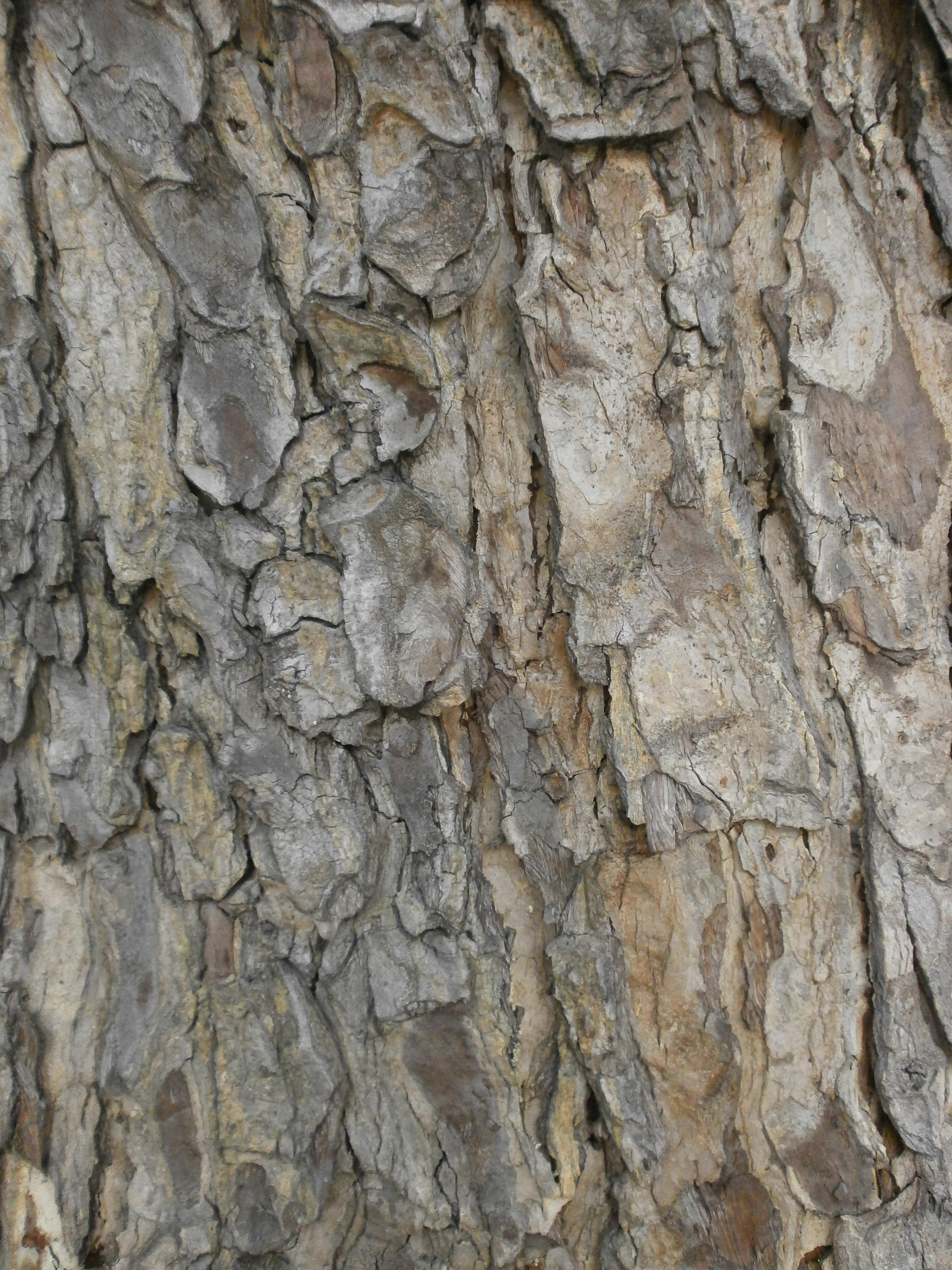
Mature bark

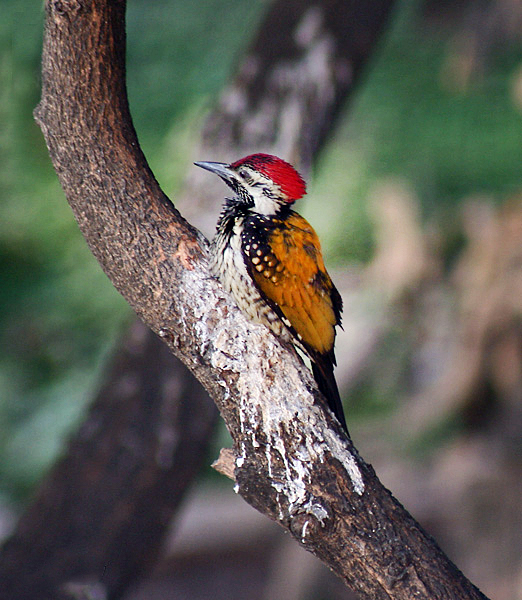
Black-rumped flameback (Dinopium benghalense)

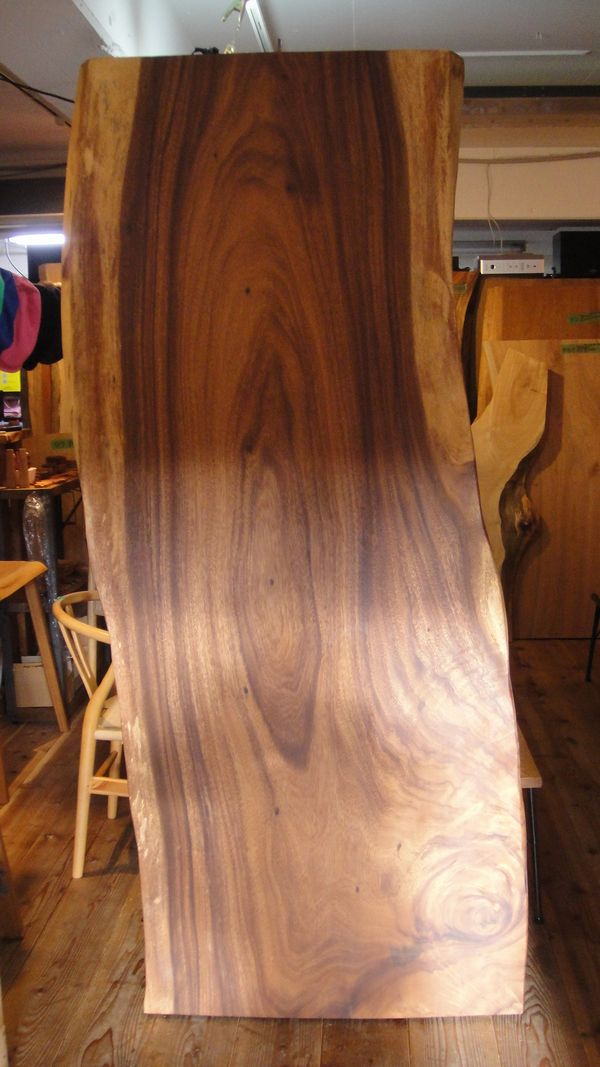
A slab of the wood showing its dark brown colour and grain
