= Waterloo Forest Reserve =

Nature preserve in Sierra Leone

The Waterloo Forest Reserve is found in Sierra Leone, Africa.

This site is 0.85 km^{2}.
