= Tingi Hills Forest Reserve =

Protected area in Sierra Leone

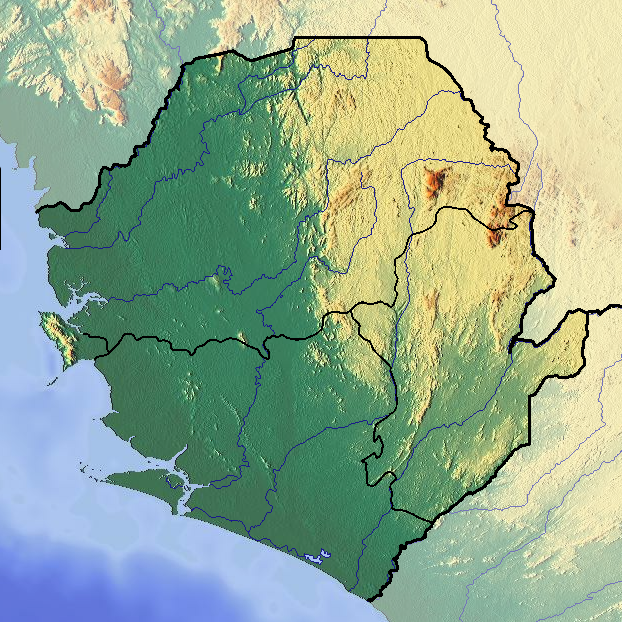
- Location within Sierra Leone
- Location: Kono District/Koinadugu District, Sierra Leone
- Nearest city: Koidu
- Coordinates: 8.92168°N 10.77744°W
- Area: 119 km^{2} (46 sq mi)
- Established: 1947

The Tingi Hills Forest Reserve is located in a mountain range in the east of Sierra Leone, partly in Kono District and partly in Koinadugu District. It occupies an area of 119 km^{2} (46 sq mi). It became a forest reserve in 1947 and a non-hunting forest reserve in 1973.

== Environment ==
The area reaches from an elevation 400 to 1,850 m (1,310 to 6,070 ft) at the north peak of the dual peaked Sankan Biriwa massif. In the lower regions the area consists of forest interspersed with savannah then moves into shrub savannah and then mountain grassland at higher altitudes. Over 200 species of birds have been recorded in the area and the reserve is also home to western baboons and forest elephants. The reserve has been designated an Important Bird Area (IBA) by BirdLife International because it supports significant populations of many bird species.

== See also ==
- Protected areas of Sierra Leone
