= John Obey Beach =

Village in Sierra Leone

Coordinates: 8°14′43.8″N 13°09′51″W

John Obey Beach (sometimes shortened to John Obey) is a village in Sierra Leone, 20 miles (32 km) south of Freetown, in the western peninsula region.

As of 2011, the village has a population of 372.

In July 2010, the local community at John Obey formed a partnership with sustainable tourism organization Tribewanted and are together building an eco community at the beach. The project has up to 30 visitors staying at any given time in earthbag domes, designed and constructed in partnership with Cal-Earth, and taking part in community life.
