= Losari, Cirebon =

District in West Java, Indonesia

Losari
- District
- Interactive map of Losari
- Coordinates: 6°50′58.965″S 108°47′22.6154″E
- Country: Indonesia
- Province: West Java
- Regency: Cirebon Regency
- District seat: Panggangsari

Area
  - Total: 45.32 km^{2} (17.50 sq mi)

Population (2020)
  - Total: 62,351
  - Density: 1,376/km^{2} (3,563/sq mi)
- Time zone: UTC+07:00 (Western Indonesia Time)
- Postal code: 45192
- Regional code: 32.09.03
- Villages: 10

Losari is an administrative district (kecamatan) in Cirebon Regency, West Java Province, Indonesia. The district covers an area of 45.32 km2, and had a population of 62,351 at the 2020 Census.

== Geography ==
Losari consists of 10 villages (desa), namely:

- Ambulu
- Astanalanggar
- Barisan
- Kalirahayu
- Kalisari
- Losari Kidul
- Losari Lor
- Mulyasari
- Panggangsari
- Tawangsari
