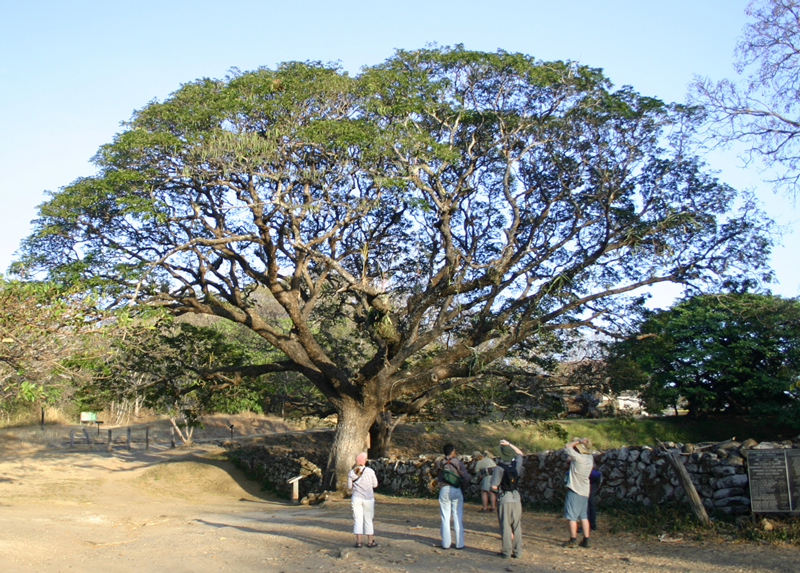
- S. saman

Scientific classification
- Kingdom: Plantae
- Clade: Tracheophytes
- Clade: Angiosperms
- Clade: Eudicots
- Clade: Rosids
- Order: Fabales
- Family: Fabaceae
- Subfamily: Caesalpinioideae
- Clade: Mimosoid clade
- Genus: Samanea (Benth.) Merr. (1916)

= Samanea =

Genus of legumes

Samanea is a genus of flowering plants in the family Fabaceae. It includes four species of trees native to the tropical Americas, ranging from Belize to Paraguay, and to the Democratic Republic of the Congo in central Africa. Habitats include tropical moist evergreen and seasonally-dry deciduous forest, woodland, and wooded grassland. It belongs to the mimosoid clade of the subfamily Caesalpinioideae. The type species is Samanea saman from South America.

== Taxonomy ==
The name Samanea comes from saman in Spanish derived from zamang used for Samanea saman, this giant S. saman tree was seen by Alexander von Humboldt near Maracay, Venezuela in 1799 when he travelled to the Americas from that year to 1804.

== Species ==
Plants of the World Online lists the following accepted species:

- Samanea guineensis (G.C.C.Gilbert & Boutique) Brenan & Brummitt
- Samanea inopinata (Harms) Barneby & J.W.Grimes
- Samanea saman (Jacq.) Merr.
- Samanea tubulosa (Benth.) Barneby & J.W.Grimes
