= Mount Bintumani =

Highest mountain in Sierra Leone

- Loma Mansa
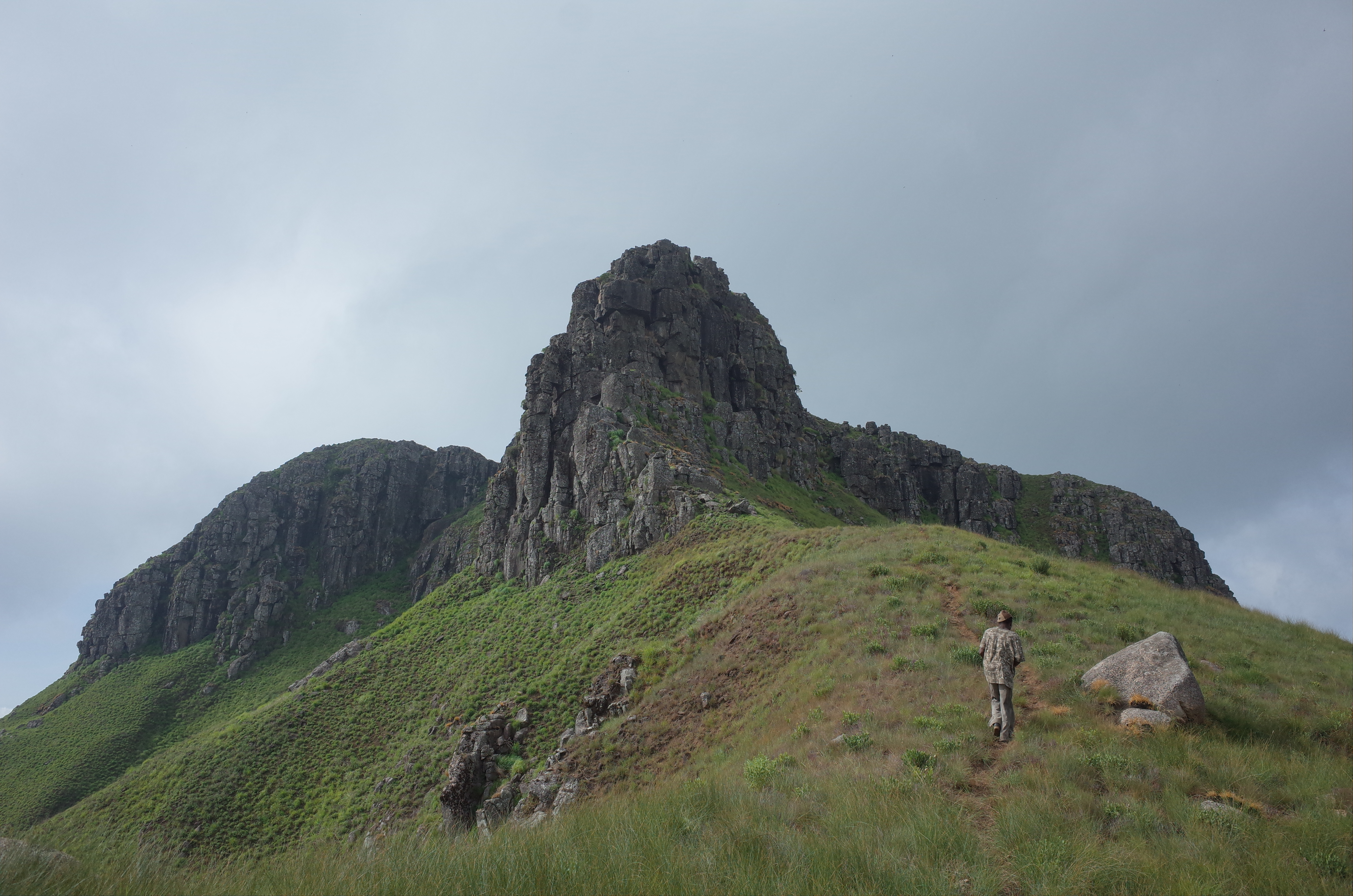

Highest point
- Elevation: 1,945 m (6,381 ft)
- Prominence: 1,665 m (5,463 ft)
- Listing: Country high point Ultra; Ribu
- Coordinates: 9°13′30″N 11°07′00″W

Geography
- Location within Sierra Leone
- Location: Sierra Leone
- Parent range: Loma Mountains

Mount Bintumani (also known as Loma Mansa) is the highest peak in Sierra Leone and the Loma Mountains, at 1,945 metres (6,381 ft). It lies in the Loma Mountains and its lower slopes are covered in rainforests, home to a wide variety of animals. These include pygmy hippopotamuses, dwarf crocodiles, rufous fishing-owls and numerous primates.

== See also ==
- List of Ultras of Africa
