= Loma Mountains =

Mountain range in Sierra Leone

- Location within Sierra Leone

Highest point
- Peak: Mount Bintumani
- Elevation: 1,945 m (6,381 ft)

Geography
- Location: Sierra Leone
- Range coordinates: 9°10′N 11°07′W

The Loma Mountains are the highest mountain range in Sierra Leone. The highest peak is Mount Bintumani which rises to a height of 1,945 metres (6,381 ft). The area has been designated a non-hunting forest reserve since 1952. The reserve covers an area of 33,201 hectares.

== Environment ==
The vegetation is characterised by Guinea–Congo lowland forest, with montane evergreen forest up to 1,680 m, and montane grassland on the plateau of the massif. At lower elevations, gallery forest and wooded savanna occur. There are also a few villages and areas of farmland.The reserve has been designated an Important Bird Area (IBA) by BirdLife International because it supports significant populations of many bird species.

== See also ==
- Protected areas of Sierra Leone
