= Sankan Biriwa =

Mountain in Sierra Leone

Coordinates: 8°54′N 10°48′W

Highest point
- Elevation: 1,715 m (5,627 ft)
- Prominence: 1,198 m (3,930 ft)
- Listing: Ribu

Geography
- Location: Sierra Leone

Sankan Biriwa is a mountain massif in the east of Sierra Leone with two peaks, both over 1,700 metres. The mountain is part of the Tingi Hills Forest Reserve.

Sankan Biriwa covers an area of 143 km2. It has had the status of a national park since 1947.

== See also ==
Protected areas of Sierra Leone
