= List of elevation extremes by country =

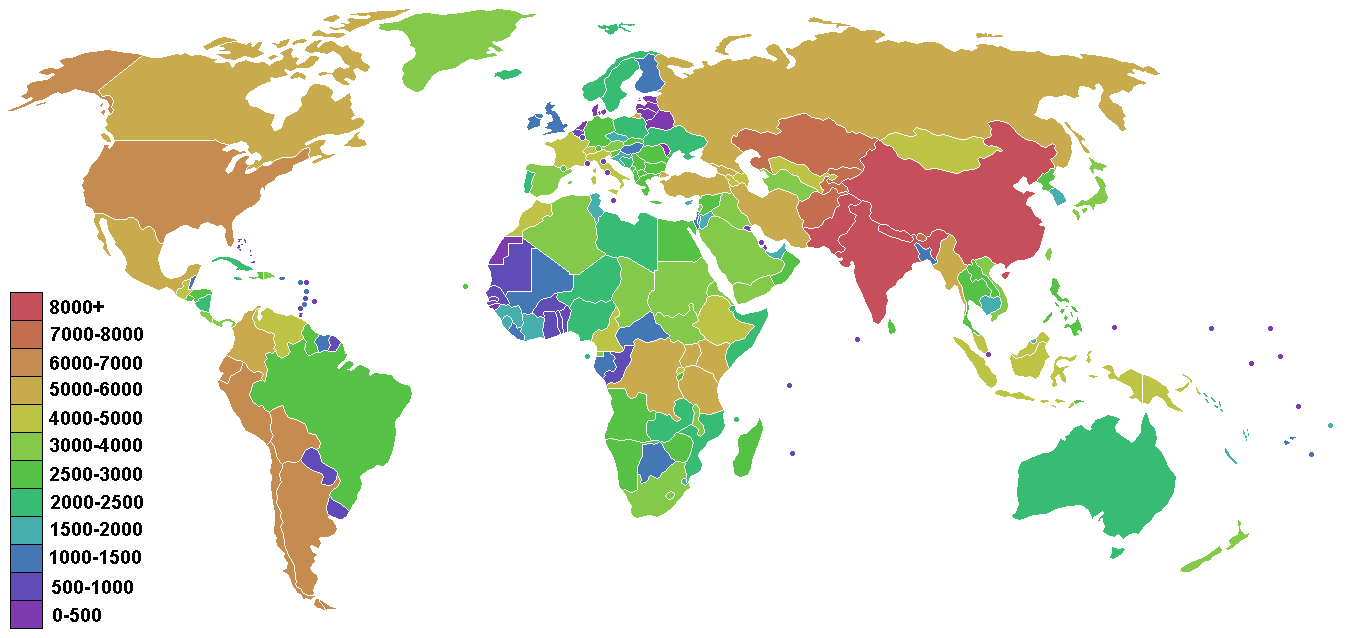
Map of countries coloured according to their highest point

The following sortable table lists land surface elevation extremes by country or dependent territory.

== Table ==
Land surface elevation extremes by country
| Country or region | Highest point | Maximum elevation | Lowest point | Minimum elevation | Elevation span |
|---|---|---|---|---|---|
| Afghanistan | Noshaq | 7492 m 24,580 ft | Amu Darya | 258 m 846 ft | 7234 m 23,734 ft |
| Albania | Korab | 2764 m 9,068 ft | Adriatic Sea | sea level | 2764 m 9,068 ft |
| Algeria | Mount Tahat | 2908 m 9,541 ft | Chott Melrhir | −40 m −131 ft | 3043 m 9,984 ft |
| American Samoa | Lata Mountain | 966 m 3,169 ft | South Pacific Ocean | sea level | 966 m 3,169 ft |
| Andorra | Coma Pedrosa | 2943 m 9,656 ft | Gran Valira | 840 m 2,756 ft | 2102 m 6,896 ft |
| Angola | Mount Moco | 2620 m 8,596 ft | South Atlantic Ocean | sea level | 2620 m 8,596 ft |
| Anguilla | Crocus Hill | 73 m 240 ft | Caribbean Sea | sea level | 73 m 240 ft |
| Antarctica | Vinson Massif | 4892 m 16,050 ft | Deep Lake, Vestfold Hills | −50 m −164 ft | 4942 m 16,214 ft |
| Antigua and Barbuda | Boggy Peak on Antigua | 402 m 1,319 ft | Caribbean Sea | sea level | 402 m 1,319 ft |
| Argentina | Aconcagua (Note: The summit of Aconcagua is the highest point outside of Asia.) (Note: The summit of Aconcagua is the second-most prominent point on Earth.) | 6961 m 22,838 ft | Laguna del Carbón (Note: Laguna del Carbón is the lowest point in both the Western Hemisphere and the Southern Hemisphere.) | −105 m −344 ft | 7065 m 23,179 ft |
| Armenia | Mount Aragats | 4090 m 13,419 ft | Aras River | 375 m 1,230 ft | 3715 m 12,188 ft |
| Aruba | Mount Jamanota | 188 m 617 ft | Caribbean Sea | sea level | 188 m 617 ft |
| Ashmore and Cartier Islands | Unnamed location | 3 m 10 ft | Indian Ocean | sea level | 3 m 10 ft |
| Australia | Mount Kosciuszko (Note: The summit of Mawson Peak (2,745 m) on Heard Island is the highest point on a dependent territory of Australia, while Mount McClintock has the highest summit (3,490 m) of any mountain on any territory of Australia.) | 2228 m 7,310 ft | Lake Eyre | −15 m −49 ft | 2243 m 7,359 ft |
| Austria | Grossglockner | 3798 m 12,461 ft | Lake Neusiedl | 115 m 377 ft | 3683 m 12,083 ft |
| Azerbaijan | Mount Bazardüzü | 4466 m 14,652 ft | Caspian Sea | −28 m −92 ft | 4513 m 14,806 ft |
| Bahamas | Mount Alvernia on Cat Island | 63 m 207 ft | North Atlantic Ocean | sea level | 63 m 207 ft |
| Bahrain | Mountain of Smoke (Jabal ad Dukhan) | 134 m 440 ft | Persian Gulf | sea level | 122 m 400 ft |
| Bangladesh | Saka Haphong | 1063 m 3,488 ft | Bay of Bengal | sea level | 1063 m 3,488 ft |
| Barbados | Mount Hillaby | 340 m 1,115 ft | North Atlantic Ocean | sea level | 336 m 1,102 ft |
| Belarus | Dzyarzhynskaya Hara | 345 m 1,132 ft | Neman | 90 m 295 ft | 256 m 840 ft |
| Belgium | Signal de Botrange | 694 m 2,277 ft | De Moeren | −4 m −13 ft | 698 m 2,290 ft |
| Belize | Doyle's Delight | 1124 m 3,688 ft | Caribbean Sea | sea level | 1124 m 3,688 ft |
| Benin | Mont Sokbaro | 658 m 2,159 ft | Bight of Benin | sea level | 658 m 2,159 ft |
| Bermuda | Town Hill | 79 m 259 ft | North Atlantic Ocean | sea level | 76 m 249 ft |
| Bhutan | Gangkhar Puensum | 7571 m 24,839 ft | Drangme Chhu | 97 m 318 ft | 7473 m 24,518 ft |
| Bir Tawil | Gabal Hagar El Zarqa | 662 m 2,172 ft | Wadi Tawil | 232 m 761 ft | 430 m 1,411 ft |
| Bolivia | Sajama | 6542 m 21,463 ft | Paraguay River | 90 m 295 ft | 6452 m 21,168 ft |
| Bosnia and Herzegovina | Maglić | 2386 m 7,828 ft | Adriatic Sea | sea level | 2386 m 7,828 ft |
| Botswana | Otse Hill or Monalanong Hill | 1494 m 4,902 ft | Confluence of Limpopo River and Shashe River | 513 m 1,683 ft | 978 m 3,209 ft |
| Bouvet Island | Olavtoppen | 780 m 2,559 ft | South Atlantic Ocean | sea level | 935 m 3,068 ft |
| Brazil | Pico da Neblina | 2995 m 9,826 ft | Atlantic Ocean | sea level | 2995 m 9,826 ft |
| British Indian Ocean Territory | Unnamed location on Diego Garcia | 15 m 49 ft | Indian Ocean | sea level | 15 m 49 ft |
| Brunei | Bukit Pagon | 1875 m 6,152 ft | South China Sea | sea level | 1850 m 6,070 ft |
| Bulgaria | Musala | 2925 m 9,596 ft | Black Sea | sea level | 2925 m 9,596 ft |
| Burkina Faso | Mount Tenakourou | 747 m 2,451 ft | Black Volta | 200 m 656 ft | 549 m 1,801 ft |
| Burundi | Mount Heha | 2684 m 8,806 ft | Lake Tanganyika | 772 m 2,533 ft | 1912 m 6,273 ft |
| Cambodia | Phnom Aural | 1813 m 5,948 ft | Gulf of Thailand | sea level | 1810 m 5,938 ft |
| Cameroon | Mount Cameroon | 4040 m 13,255 ft | Bight of Bonny | sea level | 4040 m 13,255 ft |
| Canada | Mount Logan (Note: The summit of Mount Logan is the sixth-most prominent point on Earth.) | 5959 m 19,551 ft | North Atlantic Ocean; Arctic Ocean; North Pacific Ocean | sea level | 5959 m 19,551 ft |
| Cape Verde | Pico do Fogo | 2829 m 9,281 ft | North Atlantic Ocean | sea level | 2829 m 9,281 ft |
| Cayman Islands | The Bluff on Cayman Brac | 43 m 141 ft | Caribbean Sea | sea level | 46 m 151 ft |
| Central African Republic | Mont Ngaoui | 1410 m 4,626 ft | Ubangi River | 335 m 1,099 ft | 1085 m 3,560 ft |
| Chad | Emi Koussi | 3447 m 11,309 ft | Djourab Depression | 160 m 525 ft | 3285 m 10,778 ft |
| Chile | Ojos del Salado (Note: Ojos del Salado is the highest volcano on Earth.) (Note: The summit of Rapa Nui (Easter Island) is the twelfth-most topographically isolated point on Earth.) | 6893 m 22,615 ft | South Pacific Ocean | sea level | 6893 m 22,615 ft |
| China (Note: China has the broadest range of surface elevations of any country with a span of 9,004 m (29,541 ft).) | Mount Everest (Note: The summit of Mount Everest is the highest point on Earth.) (Note: Borders Nepal) | 8849 m 29,032 ft | Ayding Lake (Note: Aydingkol is the third-lowest depression on Earth.) | −154 m −505 ft | 9,003 m 29,537 ft |
| Christmas Island | Murray Hill | 361 m 1,184 ft | Indian Ocean | sea level | 361 m 1,184 ft |
| Clipperton Island | Rocher Clipperton | 29 m 95 ft | North Pacific Ocean | sea level | 29 m 95 ft |
| Cocos (Keeling) Islands | South Island | 9 m 30 ft | Indian Ocean | sea level | 5 m 16 ft |
| Colombia | Pico Cristóbal Colón | 5775 m 18,947 ft | North Pacific Ocean; Caribbean Sea | sea level | 5720 m 18,766 ft |
| Comoros | Mount Karthala on Grande Comore | 2361 m 7,746 ft | Indian Ocean | sea level | 2360 m 7,743 ft |
| Cook Islands | Te Manga on Rarotonga | 652 m 2,139 ft | South Pacific Ocean | sea level | 652 m 2,139 ft |
| Coral Sea Islands | Unnamed location on Cato Island | 29 m 95 ft | South Pacific Ocean | sea level | 29 m 95 ft |
| Costa Rica | Cerro Chirripó | 3821 m 12,536 ft | North Pacific Ocean; Caribbean Sea | sea level | 3820 m 12,533 ft |
| Croatia | Dinara | 1831 m 6,007 ft | Adriatic Sea | sea level | 1831 m 6,007 ft |
| Cuba | Pico Turquino | 1974 m 6,476 ft | Caribbean Sea | sea level | 1974 m 6,476 ft |
| Curaçao | Sint Christoffelberg | 372 m 1,220 ft | Caribbean Sea | sea level | 375 m 1,230 ft |
| Cyprus | Mount Olympus | 1952 m 6,404 ft | Mediterranean Sea | sea level | 1952 m 6,404 ft |
| Czech Republic | Sněžka | 1603 m 5,259 ft | Elbe | 115 m 377 ft | 1487 m 4,879 ft |
| Democratic Republic of the Congo | Mount Stanley | 5109 m 16,762 ft | South Atlantic Ocean | sea level | 5109 m 16,762 ft |
| Denmark | Møllehøj | 171 m 561 ft | Lammefjord | −7 m −23 ft | 178 m 584 ft |
| Djibouti | Mousa Ali | 2021 m 6,631 ft | Lake Assal (Note: Lake Asal is the second-lowest depression on Earth.) | −155 m −509 ft | 2183 m 7,162 ft |
| Dominica | Morne Diablotins | 1447 m 4,747 ft | Caribbean Sea | sea level | 1447 m 4,747 ft |
| Dominican Republic | Pico Duarte (Note: The summit of Pico Duarte on Hispaniola is the highest point in the Caribbean.) | 3101 m 10,174 ft | Lake Enriquillo (Note: The shore of Lago Enriquillo on Hispaniola is the lowest point on any ocean island.) on Hispaniola | −45 m −148 ft | 3143 m 10,312 ft |
| Ecuador | Chimborazo (Note: The summit of Chimborazo is the farthest point from the center of the Earth.) | 6263 m 20,548 ft | Pacific Ocean | sea level | 6267 m 20,561 ft |
| Egypt | Mount Catherine | 2629 m 8,625 ft | Qattara Depression | −133 m −436 ft | 2762 m 9,062 ft |
| El Salvador | Cerro El Pital | 2730 m 8,957 ft | North Pacific Ocean | sea level | 2730 m 8,957 ft |
| Equatorial Guinea | Pico Basilé on Bioko | 3011 m 9,879 ft | North Atlantic Ocean | sea level | 3008 m 9,869 ft |
| Eritrea | Emba Soira | 3018 m 9,902 ft | Lake Kulul | −75 m −246 ft | 3093 m 10,148 ft |
| Estonia | Suur Munamägi | 318 m 1,043 ft | Baltic Sea | sea level | 318 m 1,043 ft |
| Eswatini | Emlembe | 1862 m 6,109 ft | Maputo River | 21 m 69 ft | 1841 m 6,040 ft |
| Ethiopia | Ras Dejen | 4550 m 14,928 ft | Danakil Depression | −125 m −410 ft | 4675 m 15,338 ft |
| Falkland Islands | Mount Usborne on East Falkland | 705 m 2,313 ft | South Atlantic Ocean | sea level | 705 m 2,313 ft |
| Faroe Islands | Slættaratindur on Eysturoy | 880 m 2,887 ft | North Atlantic Ocean | sea level | 880 m 2,887 ft |
| Federated States of Micronesia | Nanlaud on Pohnpei | 782 m 2,566 ft | North Pacific Ocean | sea level | 782 m 2,566 ft |
| Fiji | Tomanivi on Viti Levu | 1324 m 4,344 ft | South Pacific Ocean | sea level | 1324 m 4,344 ft |
| Finland | Halti | 1324 m 4,344 ft | Baltic Sea | sea level | 1324 m 4,344 ft |
| France | Mont Blanc (Note: The summit of Mont Blanc is the highest point in Western Europe.) | 4806 m 15,768 ft | Étang de Lavalduc | −10 m −33 ft | 4820 m 15,814 ft |
| French Guiana | Bellevue de l'Inini | 851 m 2,792 ft | North Atlantic Ocean | sea level | 851 m 2,792 ft |
| French Polynesia | Mont Orohena (Note: The summit of Mont Orohena on Tahiti is the seventh-most topographically isolated point on Earth.) | 2241 m 7,352 ft | South Pacific Ocean | sea level | 2241 m 7,352 ft |
| French Southern and Antarctic Lands | Mont Ross on Kerguelen Islands | 1850 m 6,070 ft | Indian Ocean | sea level | 1850 m 6,070 ft |
| Gabon | Mont Bengoué | 1070 m 3,510 ft | Atlantic Ocean | sea level | 1070 m 3,510 ft |
| Gambia | Sare Firasu Hill | 51 m 167 ft | North Atlantic Ocean | sea level | 51 m 167 ft |
| Georgia | Shkhara | 5203 m 17,070 ft | Black Sea | sea level | 5201 m 17,064 ft |
| Germany | Zugspitze | 2962 m 9,718 ft | Neuendorf-Sachsenbande | −4 m −12 ft | 2966 m 9,729 ft |
| Ghana | Leklata | 900 m 2,953 ft | Gulf of Guinea | sea level | 900 m 2,953 ft |
| Gibraltar | Rock of Gibraltar | 426 m 1,398 ft | Strait of Gibraltar | sea level | 426 m 1,398 ft |
| Greece | Mount Olympus | 2918 m 9,573 ft | Epitalio | −6 m −20 ft | 2924 m 9,593 ft |
| Greenland | Gunnbjørn Fjeld (Note: The summit of Gunnbjørn Fjeld in Greenland is the highest point in the Arctic, and is the ninth most topographically isolated point on Earth.) | 3694 m 12,119 ft | Arctic Ocean; North Atlantic Ocean | sea level | 3700 m 12,139 ft |
| Grenada | Mount Saint Catherine | 840 m 2,756 ft | Caribbean Sea | sea level | 840 m 2,756 ft |
| Guadeloupe | La Grande Soufrière on Basse-Terre Island | 1467 m 4,813 ft | Caribbean Sea | sea level | 1484 m 4,869 ft |
| Guam | Mount Lamlam (Note: The summit of Mount Lamlam on Guam is 11,377 meters (37,326 ft) above the Challenger Deep.) | 406 m 1,332 ft | North Pacific Ocean | sea level | 406 m 1,332 ft |
| Guatemala | Volcán Tajumulco (Note: The summit of Volcán Tajumulco is the highest point in Central America.) | 4203 m 13,789 ft | North Pacific Ocean; Caribbean Sea | sea level | 4220 m 13,845 ft |
| Guernsey | Le Moulin | 114 m 374 ft | English Channel | sea level | 114 m 374 ft |
| Guinea | Mont Nimba (Mount Richard-Molard) | 1752 m 5,748 ft | North Atlantic Ocean | sea level | 1752 m 5,748 ft |
| Guinea-Bissau | Dongol Rondè | 266 m 873 ft | North Atlantic Ocean | sea level | 266 m 873 ft |
| Guyana | Mount Roraima | 2772 m 9,094 ft (Note: Altitude listed by, but apparently calculated by geoprocessing from a topographic dataset; no documented surveys are known. Mount Roraima is not a well-defined sharp peak, but rather a tepui, a roughly flat tabletop plateau shared with Venezuela and Brazil. The highest point of the plateau is inside Venezuelan territory at 2,810 metres (9,220 ft). The Guyanese part of Mount Roraima is in a disputed region claimed by Venezuela. Therefore, Venezuela does not recognize Mount Roraima as the highest point of Guyana.) | North Atlantic Ocean | sea level | 2772 m 9,094 ft |
| Haiti | Pic la Selle | 2680 m 8,793 ft | Caribbean Sea | sea level | 2680 m 8,793 ft |
| Heard Island and McDonald Islands | Big Ben (Mawson Peak) | 2745 m 9,006 ft | Indian Ocean | sea level | 2745 m 9,006 ft |
| Honduras | Cerro Las Minas | 2870 m 9,416 ft | Caribbean Sea; North Pacific Ocean | sea level | 2870 m 9,416 ft |
| Hong Kong | Tai Mo Shan | 957 m 3,140 ft | South China Sea | sea level | 958 m 3,143 ft |
| Hungary | Kékes | 1014 m 3,327 ft | Tisza | 76 m 249 ft | 938 m 3,077 ft |
| Iceland | Hvannadalshnúkur | 2110 m 6,921 ft | North Atlantic Ocean | sea level | 2110 m 6,921 ft |
| India | Kangchenjunga (Note: Kangchenjunga is the third-highest mountain peak on Earth.) | 8586 m 28,169 ft | Kuttanad | −3 m −9 ft | 8589 m 28,178 ft |
| Indonesia | Puncak Jaya on New Guinea (Note: The summit of Puncak Jaya is the highest point on any ocean island, and the fifth-most topographically isolated and the ninth-most topographically prominent point on Earth.) | 4884 m 16,024 ft | Indian Ocean; South Pacific Ocean | sea level | 4884 m 16,024 ft |
| Iran | Damavand | 5609 m 18,402 ft | Caspian Sea | −28 m −92 ft | 5638 m 18,497 ft |
| Iraq | Cheekha Dar | 3611 m 11,847 ft | Persian Gulf | sea level | 3611 m 11,847 ft |
| Ireland | Carrauntoohil | 1039 m 3,409 ft | Irish Sea | sea level | 1039 m 3,409 ft |
| Isle of Man | Snaefell | 621 m 2,037 ft | Irish Sea | sea level | 621 m 2,037 ft |
| Israel | Mount Meron (de jure; inside the Green Line) Mount Hermon (de facto; in the Golan Heights) (Note: Only the southern slopes of Mount Hermon extend into the Israeli-annexed Golan Heights. A peak in this area rising to 2236 m or 7336 ft is the highest point under Israeli control.) | 1204 m 3,950 ft | Dead Sea (Note: The shore of the Dead Sea is the lowest point on the surface of the Earth. The water table drops about 1 m per year, level -440 m refers to year 2025.) | −440 m −1,444 ft | 1644 m 5,394 ft |
| Italy | Mont Blanc | 4806 m 15,768 ft | Jolanda di Savoia | −3 m −10 ft | 4813 m 15,791 ft |
| Ivory Coast | Mont Nimba (Mount Richard-Molard) | 1752 m 5,748 ft | Gulf of Guinea | sea level | 1752 m 5,748 ft |
| Jamaica | Blue Mountain Peak | 2256 m 7,402 ft | Caribbean Sea | sea level | 2256 m 7,402 ft |
| Japan | Mount Fuji on Honshu | 3776 m 12,388 ft | Hachiro-gata on Honshu | −4 m −13 ft | 3780 m 12,402 ft |
| Jersey | Les Platons | 136 m 446 ft | English Channel | sea level | 136 m 446 ft |
| Jordan | Jabal Umm ad Dami | 1854 m 6,083 ft | Dead Sea | −440 m −1,444 ft | 2294 m 7,526 ft |
| Kazakhstan | Khan Tengri | 7010 m 22,999 ft | Karagiye Depression | −134 m −440 ft | 7144 m 23,438 ft |
| Kenya | Mount Kenya | 5199 m 17,057 ft | Indian Ocean | sea level | 5199 m 17,057 ft |
| Kiribati | Unnamed location on Banaba | 81 m 266 ft | Pacific Ocean | sea level | 81 m 266 ft |
| Kosovo | Velika Rudoka | 2660 m 8,728 ft | White Drin | 297 m 974 ft | 2359 m 7,740 ft |
| Kuwait | Unnamed location in westernmost Kuwait | 291 m 955 ft | Persian Gulf | sea level | 291 m 955 ft |
| Kyrgyzstan | Jengish Chokusu | 7439 m 24,406 ft | Kara Darya | 435 m 1,427 ft | 7004 m 22,979 ft |
| Laos | Phou Bia | 2830 m 9,285 ft | Mekong | 70 m 230 ft | 2747 m 9,012 ft |
| Latvia | Gaiziņkalns | 312 m 1,024 ft | Baltic Sea | sea level | 312 m 1,024 ft |
| Lebanon | Qurnat as Sawda' | 3088 m 10,131 ft | Mediterranean Sea | sea level | 3088 m 10,131 ft |
| Lesotho | Thabana Ntlenyana (Note: The summit of Thabana Ntlenyana is the eleventh most topographically isolated point on Earth.) | 3482 m 11,424 ft | Confluence of Orange River and Makhaleng River | 1400 m 4,593 ft | 2082 m 6,831 ft |
| Liberia | Mount Wuteve | 1447 m 4,747 ft | North Atlantic Ocean | sea level | 1440 m 4,724 ft |
| Libya | Bikku Bitti | 2267 m 7,438 ft | Sabkhat Ghuzayyil | −47 m −154 ft | 2314 m 7,592 ft |
| Liechtenstein | Grauspitz | 2599 m 8,527 ft | Rhine | 430 m 1,411 ft | 2169 m 7,116 ft |
| Lithuania | Aukštojas Hill | 294 m 964 ft | Nemunas Delta | −5 m −16 ft | 295 m 968 ft |
| Luxembourg | Kneiff | 560 m 1,837 ft | Moselle River | 133 m 436 ft | 427 m 1,401 ft |
| Macau | Coloane Alto on Gau Ou Saan | 172 m 564 ft | South China Sea | sea level | 172 m 564 ft |
| Madagascar | Maromokotro | 2876 m 9,436 ft | Indian Ocean | sea level | 2876 m 9,436 ft |
| Malawi | Mount Mulanje | 3002 m 9,849 ft | Shire River | 37 m 121 ft | 2965 m 9,728 ft |
| Malaysia | Gunung Kinabalu on Borneo | 4095 m 13,436 ft | South China Sea; Indian Ocean | sea level | 4095 m 13,436 ft |
| Maldives (Note: Maldives has an average surface elevation of just 800 mm (31 in).) | Mount Villingili on Villingili | 5 m 17 ft | Indian Ocean | sea level | 5 m 17 ft |
| Mali | Hombori Tondo | 1155 m 3,789 ft | Senegal River | 23 m 75 ft | 1132 m 3,714 ft |
| Malta | Ta'Dmejrek on Malta Island | 253 m 830 ft | Mediterranean Sea | sea level | 253 m 830 ft |
| Marshall Islands | Unnamed location on Likiep | 10 m 33 ft | North Pacific Ocean | sea level | 10 m 33 ft |
| Martinique | Mount Pelée | 1397 m 4,583 ft | Caribbean Sea | sea level | 1397 m 4,583 ft |
| Mauritania | Kediet ej Jill | 915 m 3,002 ft | Sebkha de Ndrhamcha | −5 m −16 ft | 920 m 3,018 ft |
| Mauritius | Piton de la Petite Rivière Noire | 828 m 2,717 ft | Indian Ocean | sea level | 828 m 2,717 ft |
| Mayotte | Benara on Mahoré | 660 m 2,165 ft | Mozambique Channel | sea level | 660 m 2,165 ft |
| Mexico | Volcán Citlaltépetl (Pico de Orizaba) (Note: The summit of Volcán Citlaltépetl (Pico de Orizaba) is the seventh-most prominent point on Earth.) | 5636 m 18,491 ft | Laguna Salada | −10 m −33 ft | 5646 m 18,524 ft |
| Moldova | Bălănești Hill | 430 m 1,411 ft | Dniester | 2 m 7 ft | 428 m 1,404 ft |
| Monaco | along Chemin des Révoires on Mont Agel | 162 m 531 ft | Mediterranean Sea | sea level | 161 m 528 ft |
| Mongolia | Khüiten Peak | 4356 m 14,291 ft | Khökh Nuur | 560 m 1,837 ft | 3856 m 12,651 ft |
| Montenegro | Zla Kolata | 2534 m 8,314 ft | Adriatic Sea | sea level | 2534 m 8,314 ft |
| Montserrat | Chances Peak | 915 m 3,002 ft | Caribbean Sea | sea level | 915 m 3,002 ft |
| Morocco (Note: Both Morocco and the Sahrawi Arab Democratic Republic claim all of Western Sahara.) | Jbel Toubkal | 4167 m 13,671 ft | Sebkha Tah | −55 m −180 ft | 4222 m 13,852 ft |
| Mozambique | Monte Binga | 2440 m 8,005 ft | Mozambique Channel | sea level | 2436 m 7,992 ft |
| Myanmar | Hkakabo Razi | 5881 m 19,295 ft | Indian Ocean | sea level | 5881 m 19,295 ft |
| Namibia | Königstein | 2573 m 8,442 ft | South Atlantic Ocean | sea level | 2573 m 8,442 ft |
| Nauru | Command Ridge | 65 m 213 ft | South Pacific Ocean | sea level | 65 m 213 ft |
| Nepal | Mount Everest (Note: Borders China.) | 8849 m 29,032 ft | Mukhiyapatti Musharniya | 59 m 194 ft | 8789 m 28,835 ft |
| Netherlands | Mount Scenery (Note: The summit of the Vaalserberg at 322.7 m (1059 ft) is the highest point in the European Netherlands.) on Saba | 870 m 2,854 ft | Vergeten Plek, in the Zuidplaspolder near Waddinxveen | −7 m −22 ft | 894 m 2,932 ft |
| New Caledonia | Mont Panié | 1628 m 5,341 ft | Coral Sea | sea level | 1628 m 5,341 ft |
| New Zealand | Aoraki / Mount Cook (Note: The summit of Aoraki / Mount Cook on the South Island is the tenth-most topographically isolated point on Earth.) in the South Island | 3724 m 12,218 ft | Unnamed location near Momona, Taieri Plains, Otago | −2 m −7 ft | 3726 m 12,224 ft |
| Nicaragua | Mogotón | 2085 m 6,841 ft | North Pacific Ocean; Caribbean Sea | sea level | 2107 m 6,913 ft |
| Niger | Mont Idoukal-n-Taghès | 2002 m 6,568 ft | Niger River | 200 m 656 ft | 1822 m 5,978 ft |
| Nigeria | Chappal Waddi | 2419 m 7,936 ft | Unnamed location on Lagos Island | −0.2 m −0.7 ft | 2419 m 7,937 ft |
| Niue | Unnamed location near Mutalau on Niue | 68 m 223 ft | South Pacific Ocean | sea level | 68 m 223 ft |
| Norfolk Island | Mount Bates | 319 m 1,047 ft | South Pacific Ocean | sea level | 319 m 1,047 ft |
| North Korea | Paektu-san | 2744 m 9,003 ft | Sea of Japan; Yellow Sea | sea level | 2744 m 9,003 ft |
| North Macedonia | Golem Korab | 2764 m 9,068 ft | Vardar | 50 m 164 ft | 2714 m 8,904 ft |
| Northern Mariana Islands | Mount Agrihan on Agrihan | 965 m 3,166 ft | North Pacific Ocean | sea level | 965 m 3,166 ft |
| Norway | Galdhøpiggen | 2469 m 8,100 ft | Norwegian Sea | sea level | 2469 m 8,100 ft |
| Oman | Jabal Shams | 3018 m 9,902 ft | Arabian Sea | sea level | 3009 m 9,872 ft |
| Pakistan | K2 (Note: K2, the second-highest mountain peak on Earth, is in a disputed region. The area around K2 is claimed by Pakistan, India and China, and is currently controlled by Pakistan and China.) | 8611 m 28,251 ft | Arabian Sea | sea level | 8611 m 28,251 ft |
| Palau | Mount Ngerchelchuus on Babeldaob | 242 m 794 ft | North Pacific Ocean | sea level | 242 m 794 ft |
| Palestine | Mount Nabi Yunis | 1030 m 3,379 ft | Dead Sea | −440 m −1,444 ft | 1470 m 4,823 ft |
| Panama | Volcán Barú | 3475 m 11,401 ft | North Pacific Ocean; Caribbean Sea | sea level | 3475 m 11,401 ft |
| Papua New Guinea | Mount Wilhelm | 4509 m 14,793 ft | South Pacific Ocean | sea level | 4509 m 14,793 ft |
| Paraguay | Cerro Peró | 842 m 2,762 ft | Paraguay River | 46 m 151 ft | 796 m 2,612 ft |
| Peru | Huascarán (Note: The summit of Huascarán is the highest point in the Tropics.) | 6768 m 22,205 ft | Bayóvar Depression | −34 m −112 ft | 6802 m 22,316 ft |
| Philippines | Mount Apo on Mindanao | 2954 m 9,692 ft | Philippine Sea; South China Sea | sea level | 2954 m 9,692 ft |
| Pitcairn Islands | Pawala Valley Ridge | 347 m 1,138 ft | South Pacific Ocean | sea level | 347 m 1,138 ft |
| Poland | Rysy | 2500 m 8,202 ft | Marzęcino | −2 m −7 ft | 2502 m 8,209 ft |
| Portugal | Montanha do Pico on Pico Island (Note: The summit of Torre is the highest point in continental Portugal.) | 2351 m 7,713 ft | North Atlantic Ocean | sea level | 2351 m 7,713 ft |
| Puerto Rico | Cerro de Punta | 1338 m 4,390 ft | Caribbean Sea | sea level | 1338 m 4,390 ft |
| Qatar | Qurayn Abu al Bawl | 103 m 338 ft | Dukhan Sabkha | −6 m −20 ft | 109 m 358 ft |
| Republic of the Congo | Mont Nabemba | 1020 m 3,346 ft | South Atlantic Ocean | sea level | 1020 m 3,346 ft |
| Réunion | Piton des Neiges | 3070 m 10,072 ft | Indian Ocean | sea level | 3069 m 10,069 ft |
| Romania | Moldoveanu | 2545 m 8,350 ft | Black Sea | sea level | 2544 m 8,346 ft |
| Russia | Mount Elbrus (Note: The summit of Mount Elbrus is the highest point in Europe, and the tenth-most prominent point on Earth.) | 5642 m 18,510 ft | Caspian Sea (Note: The shore of the Caspian Sea is the lowest point in Europe.) | −28 m −92 ft | 5670 m 18,602 ft |
| Rwanda | Mount Karisimbi | 4507 m 14,787 ft | Ruzizi River | 950 m 3,117 ft | 3557 m 11,670 ft |
| Sahrawi Republic | Western Sahara Peak 620 | 620 m 2,034 ft | Sebjet Tah | −55 m −180 ft | 660 m 2,165 ft |
| Saint Barthélemy | Morne de Vitet | 286 m 938 ft | Caribbean Sea | sea level | 286 m 938 ft |
| Saint Helena, Ascension and Tristan da Cunha | Queen Mary's Peak on Tristan da Cunha | 2062 m 6,765 ft | South Atlantic Ocean | sea level | 2060 m 6,759 ft |
| Saint Kitts and Nevis | Mount Liamuiga on Saint Kitts | 1156 m 3,793 ft | Caribbean Sea | sea level | 1156 m 3,793 ft |
| Saint Lucia | Mount Gimie | 950 m 3,117 ft | Caribbean Sea | sea level | 950 m 3,117 ft |
| Saint Martin | Pic Paradis on Saint Martin | 424 m 1,391 ft | Caribbean Sea | sea level | 424 m 1,391 ft |
| Saint Pierre and Miquelon | Morne de la Grande Montagne on Miquelon | 240 m 787 ft | North Atlantic Ocean | sea level | 240 m 787 ft |
| Saint Vincent and the Grenadines | La Soufrière | 1235 m 4,052 ft | Caribbean Sea | sea level | 1234 m 4,049 ft |
| Samoa | Mauga Silisili on Savai'i | 1858 m 6,096 ft | South Pacific Ocean | sea level | 1857 m 6,093 ft |
| San Marino | Monte Titano | 739 m 2,425 ft | Ausa River | 55 m 180 ft | 684 m 2,244 ft |
| São Tomé and Príncipe | Pico de São Tomé on São Tomé Island | 2024 m 6,640 ft | Gulf of Guinea | sea level | 2024 m 6,640 ft |
| Saudi Arabia | Jabal Soudah (official) or Jabal Ferwa (Asir) (most recent survey) | 3207 m 10,522 ft | Sabkhat Matti | −17 m −57 ft | 3015 m 9,892 ft |
| Senegal | Felo Barkere | 638 m 2,093 ft | North Atlantic Ocean | sea level | 638 m 2,093 ft |
| Serbia | Midžor (Velika Rudoka if Kosovo is considered part of Serbia) | 2169 m 7,116 ft | Confluence of the Timok River and the Danube River | 28 m 92 ft | 2141 m 7,024 ft |
| Seychelles | Morne Seychellois on Mahé | 905 m 2,969 ft | Indian Ocean | sea level | 905 m 2,969 ft |
| Sierra Leone | Mount Bintumani | 1945 m 6,381 ft | North Atlantic Ocean | sea level | 1948 m 6,391 ft |
| Singapore | Bukit Timah Hill | 164 m 537 ft | Singapore Strait | sea level | 164 m 537 ft |
| Sint Maarten | 200 m SW of Flagstaff Peak (The summit is wholly in Saint Martin.) | 383 m 1,257 ft | Caribbean Sea | sea level | 383 m 1,257 ft |
| Slovakia | Gerlachovský štít | 2654 m 8,707 ft | Bodrog | 94 m 308 ft | 2561 m 8,402 ft |
| Slovenia | Triglav | 2864 m 9,396 ft | Adriatic Sea | sea level | 2864 m 9,396 ft |
| Solomon Islands | Mount Popomanaseu on Guadalcanal | 2335 m 7,661 ft | South Pacific Ocean | sea level | 2335 m 7,661 ft |
| Somalia | Shimbiris | 2460 m 8,071 ft | Indian Ocean | sea level | 2450 m 8,038 ft |
| South Africa | Mafadi | 3446 m 11,306 ft | South Atlantic Ocean; Indian Ocean | sea level | 3450 m 11,319 ft |
| South Georgia and the South Sandwich Islands | Mount Paget (Note: Mount Paget on South Georgia is the highest mountain peak in the South Atlantic Ocean.) | 2935 m 9,629 ft | South Atlantic Ocean | sea level | 2934 m 9,626 ft |
| South Korea | Halla-san on Jejudo | 1947 m 6,388 ft | Sea of Japan; Yellow Sea | sea level | 1947 m 6,388 ft |
| South Sudan | Kinyeti | 3187 m 10,456 ft | White Nile | 350 m 1,148 ft | 2837 m 9,308 ft |
| Spain | Teide (Note: Teide is the highest mountain peak in the Atlantic Ocean.) on Tenerife (Note: The summit of Mulhacén is the highest point in continental Spain.) | 3715 m 12,188 ft | North Atlantic Ocean; Mediterranean Sea | sea level | 3715 m 12,188 ft |
| Spratly Islands (Note: The Spratly Islands are claimed by China, Taiwan, Vietnam, Malaysia and the Philippines.) | Unnamed location on Southwest Cay | 4 m 13 ft | South China Sea | sea level | 4 m 13 ft |
| Sri Lanka | Pidurutalagala on Sri Lanka | 2524 m 8,281 ft | Indian Ocean | sea level | 2524 m 8,281 ft |
| Sudan | Jabal Marrah (Deriba Caldera) | 3024 m 9,921 ft | Red Sea | sea level | 3042 m 9,980 ft |
| Suriname | Juliana Top | 1280 m 4,199 ft | North Atlantic Ocean | sea level | 1230 m 4,035 ft |
| Svalbard and Jan Mayen | Haakon VII Toppen | 2277 m 7,470 ft | Norwegian Sea | sea level | 2277 m 7,470 ft |
| Sweden | Kebnekaise | 2097 m 6,880 ft | Kristianstad | −2 m −8 ft | 2099 m 6,888 ft |
| Switzerland | Dufourspitze (Monte Rosa) | 4634 m 15,203 ft | Lake Maggiore | 193 m 633 ft | 4441 m 14,570 ft |
| Syria | Jabal el-Sheikh (Mount Hermon) | 2814 m 9,232 ft | Northeast shores of the Sea of Galilee in the Golan Heights (from Syrian point of view; See Israeli-occupied territories) | −214 m −702 ft | 2814 m 9,232 ft |
| Taiwan (Note: The sovereignty of the Republic of China, which controls Taiwan, Kinmen and Matsu, is disputed.) | Yu Shan (Jade Mountain) | 3952 m 12,966 ft | Philippine Sea; South China Sea; East China Sea | sea level | 3952 m 12,966 ft |
| Tajikistan | Ismoil Somoni Peak | 7495 m 24,590 ft | Syr Darya | 300 m 984 ft | 7195 m 23,606 ft |
| Tanzania | Kilimanjaro (Note: The summit of Mount Kilimanjaro is the highest point in Africa, and the fourth-most prominent point on Earth.) | 5895 m 19,341 ft | Indian Ocean | sea level | 5892 m 19,331 ft |
| Thailand | Doi Inthanon | 2565 m 8,415 ft | Gulf of Thailand; Andaman Sea | sea level | 2565 m 8,415 ft |
| Timor-Leste | Mount Ramelau on Timor | 2963 m 9,721 ft | Timor Sea | sea level | 2963 m 9,721 ft |
| Togo | Mont Atilakoutse | 991 m 3,251 ft | Bight of Benin | sea level | 991 m 3,251 ft |
| Tokelau | Unnamed location on Nukunonu | 5 m 16 ft | South Pacific Ocean | sea level | 5 m 16 ft |
| Tonga | Kao | 1030 m 3,379 ft | South Pacific Ocean | sea level | 1033 m 3,389 ft |
| Trinidad and Tobago | El Cerro del Aripo on Trinidad | 940 m 3,084 ft | Caribbean Sea | sea level | 940 m 3,084 ft |
| Tunisia | Jebel ech Chambi | 1544 m 5,066 ft | Shatt al Gharsah | −17 m −56 ft | 1561 m 5,121 ft |
| Turkey | Mount Ararat | 5137 m 16,854 ft | Mediterranean Sea; Black Sea | sea level | 5137 m 16,854 ft |
| Turkmenistan | Aýrybaba | 3138 m 10,295 ft | Vpadina Akchanaya (Note: Sarygamysh Koli (Turkmen: Sarygamyş köli, Uzbek: Sariqamish ko‘li) is a salt lake on the border between Turkmenistan and Uzbekistan which dries into salt ponds and can eventually leave a salt flat with an elevation as low as −110 m (−361 ft) in Turkmenistan. At present, the water level of the main lake in Turkmenistan is about −60 m (−197 ft), with a higher lake in Uzbekistan at −12 m (−39 ft).) | −81 m −266 ft | 3220 m 10,564 ft |
| Turks and Caicos Islands | Blue Hills on Providenciales | 49 m 161 ft | North Atlantic Ocean | sea level | 49 m 161 ft |
| Tuvalu | Unnamed location on Niulakita | 5 m 15 ft | South Pacific Ocean | sea level | 5 m 15 ft |
| Uganda | Mount Stanley | 5109 m 16,762 ft | Albert Nile | 621 m 2,037 ft | 4488 m 14,724 ft |
| Ukraine | Hoverla | 2061 m 6,762 ft | Kuyalnik Estuary | −5 m −16 ft | 2066 m 6,778 ft |
| United Arab Emirates | Jabal Al Jais | 1892 m 6,207 ft | Sabkhat Matti | −17 m −57 ft | 1910 m 6,266 ft |
| United Kingdom | Ben Nevis (Note: The summits of Mount Paget and Mount Hope (Palmer Land) are higher than Ben Nevis at 9,629 and 10,627 ft, respectively. Mount Hope is not internationally recognised to be part of the United Kingdom, and Mount Paget is not on the British Isles.) | 1345 m 4,413 ft | Holme Fen | −3 m −9 ft | 1348 m 4,423 ft |
| United States | Denali (Mount McKinley) (Note: The summit of Denali is the highest point in North America, and the third most prominent point on Earth.) (Note: Mauna Kea on Hawaiʻi is the highest mountain peak in the North Pacific Ocean. Its summit is the eighth most topographically isolated point on Earth.) (Note: The Highest point in the contiguous United States is Mount Whitney in the Sierra Nevada.) | 6190 m 20,308 ft | Badwater Basin (Note: The Badwater Basin in Death Valley is the lowest point in North America.) | −85.5 m −281 ft | 6276 m 20,591 ft |
| United States Minor Outlying Islands | Unnamed hill on Sand Island (Johnston Atoll) | 10 m 33 ft | Pacific Ocean | sea level | 13 m 43 ft |
| Uruguay | Cerro Catedral | 514 m 1,685 ft | South Atlantic Ocean | sea level | 514 m 1,685 ft |
| Uzbekistan | Khazret Sultan | 4643 m 15,233 ft | Sariqarnish Kuli | −12 m −39 ft | 4680 m 15,354 ft |
| Vanuatu | Mount Tabwemasana on Espiritu Santo | 1879 m 6,165 ft | South Pacific Ocean | sea level | 1877 m 6,158 ft |
| Vatican City | Vatican Hill | 75 m 246 ft | Saint Peter's Square | 33 m 108 ft | 42 m 138 ft |
| Venezuela | Pico Bolívar | 4978 m 16,332 ft | Lagunillas Municipality, Zulia | −12 m −39 ft | 4990 m 16,371 ft |
| Vietnam | Fansipan | 3147 m 10,325 ft | South China Sea; Gulf of Thailand | sea level | 3143 m 10,312 ft |
| British Virgin Islands | Mount Sage on Tortola | 523 m 1,716 ft | Caribbean Sea | sea level | 521 m 1,709 ft |
| United States Virgin Islands | Crown Mountain on Saint Thomas | 474 m 1,555 ft | Caribbean Sea | sea level | 474 m 1,555 ft |
| Wallis and Futuna | Mont Puke on Futuna | 524 m 1,719 ft | South Pacific Ocean | sea level | 524 m 1,719 ft |
| Yemen | Jabal An-Nabi Shu'ayb | 3666 m 12,028 ft | Arabian Sea | sea level | 3666 m 12,028 ft |
| Zambia | Mafinga Central | 2339 m 7,674 ft | Zambezi | 329 m 1,079 ft | 2010 m 6,594 ft |
| Zimbabwe | Mount Nyangani | 2592 m 8,504 ft | Confluence of Runde River and Save River | 162 m 531 ft | 2430 m 7,972 ft |
| (United Nations) Earth | Mount Everest | 8849 m 29,032 ft | Dead Sea | −440 m −1,444 ft | 9,289 m 30,476 ft |

== National elevation ranges ==
Of all countries, Lesotho has the world's highest low point at 1,400 metres (4,593 ft). Other countries with high low points include Rwanda 950 metres (3,117 ft) and Andorra 840 metres (2,756 ft). Countries with very low high points include Maldives 5 metres (16 ft), Tuvalu, 5 metres (16 ft) and the Marshall Islands 10 metres (33 ft). These island countries also have the smallest range between their lowest (sea level) and highest points, and are very sensitive to changes in sea level.

The highest and lowest points in China constitute the greatest elevation range within any single country at 9,002 metres (29,534 ft). The elevation ranges are also great in Nepal 8,789 metres (28,835 ft), Pakistan 8,611 metres (28,251 ft), and India 8,588.7 metres (28,178 ft).

Monaco's elevation range is among the greatest relative to surface area. Within its 2.02 km^{2} territory, there is a difference of 140 m between its highest and lowest points.

== Gallery ==
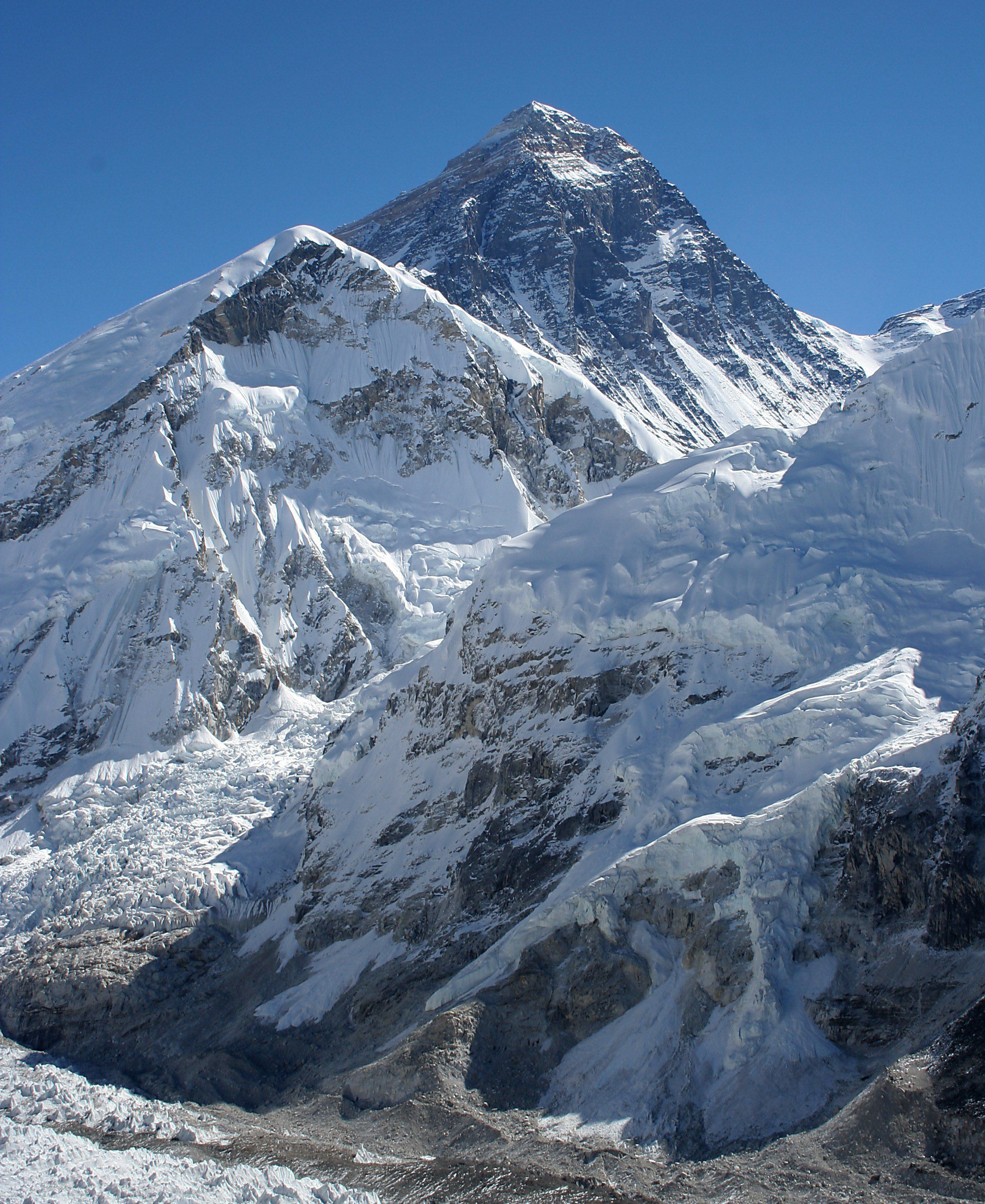
The summit of Mount Everest is the highest point on Earth.

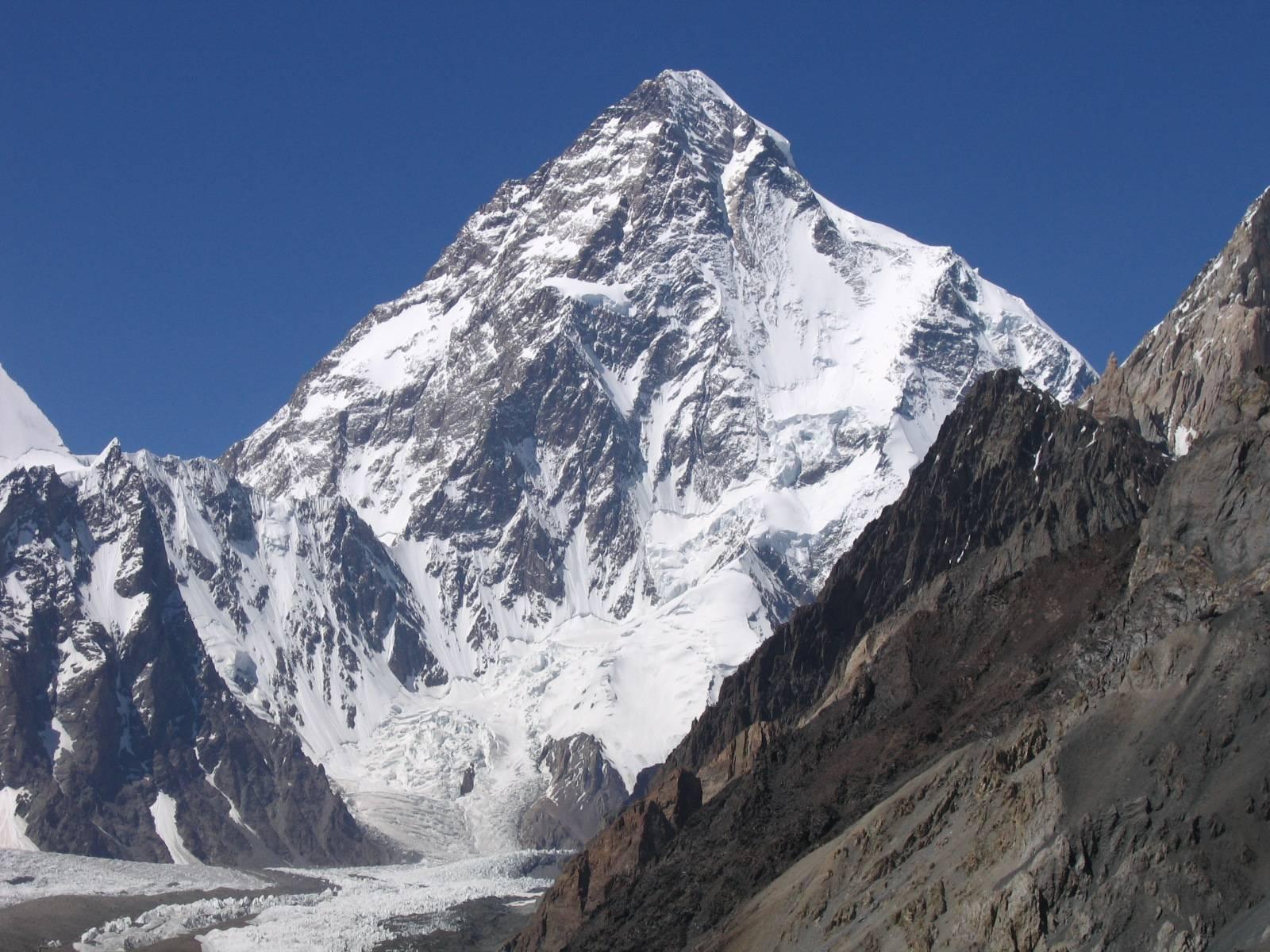
The summit of K2 is the highest point of Pakistan.

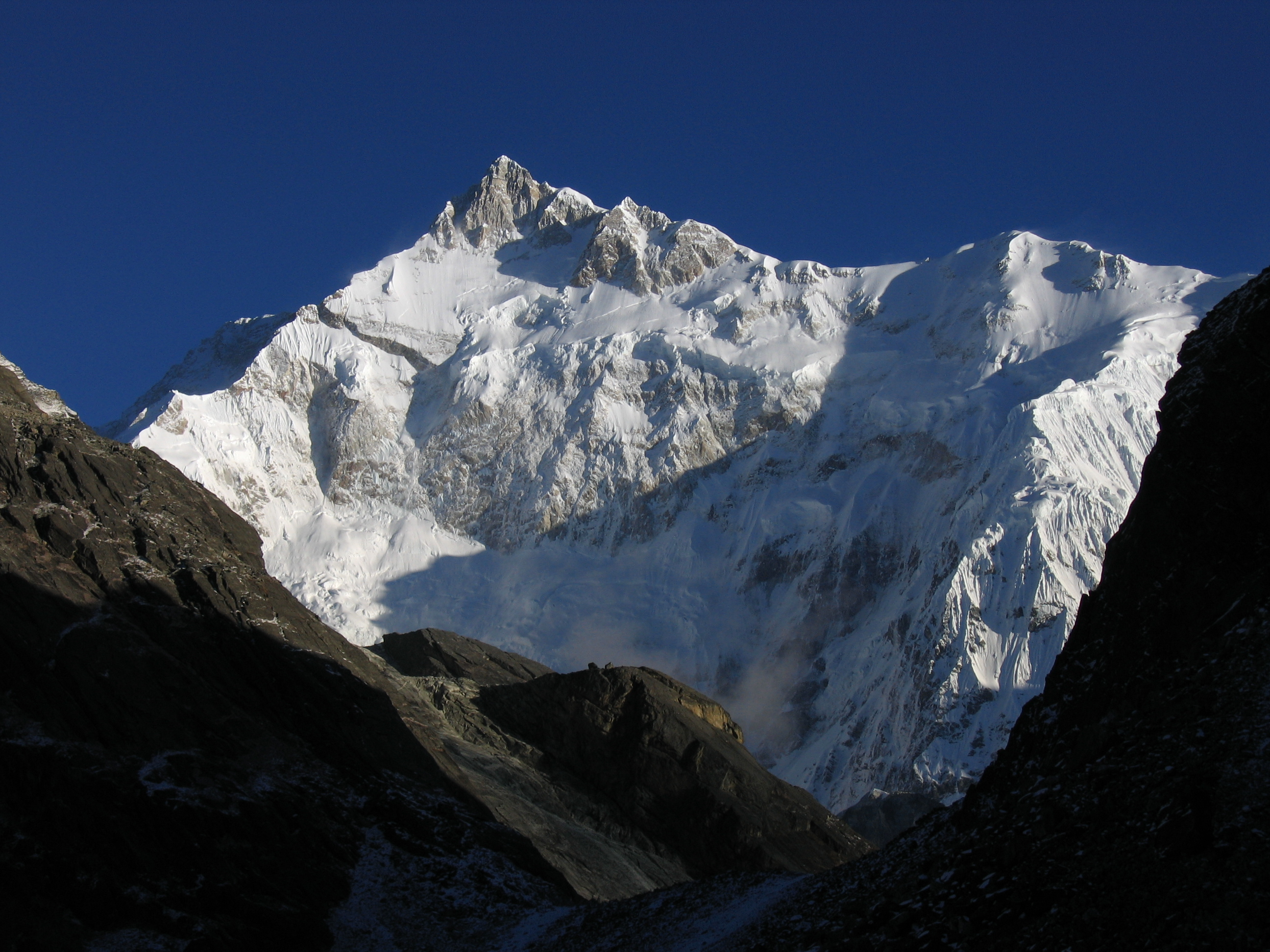
The summit of Kangchenjunga is the highest point of India.

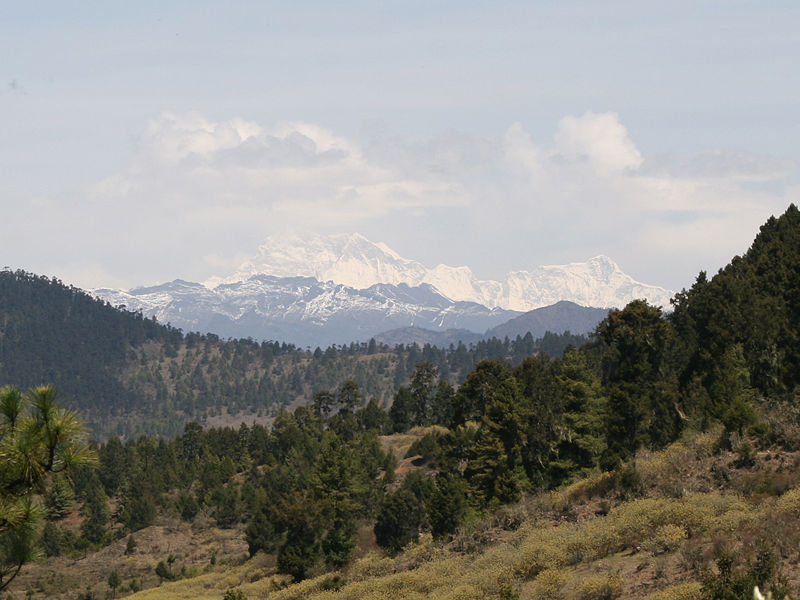
The summit of Gangkhar Puensum is the highest point of Bhutan.

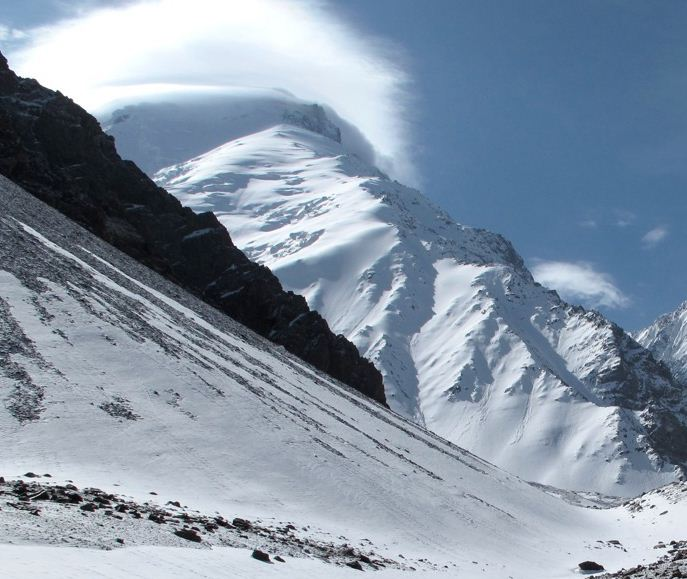
The summit of Noshakh is the highest point of Afghanistan.

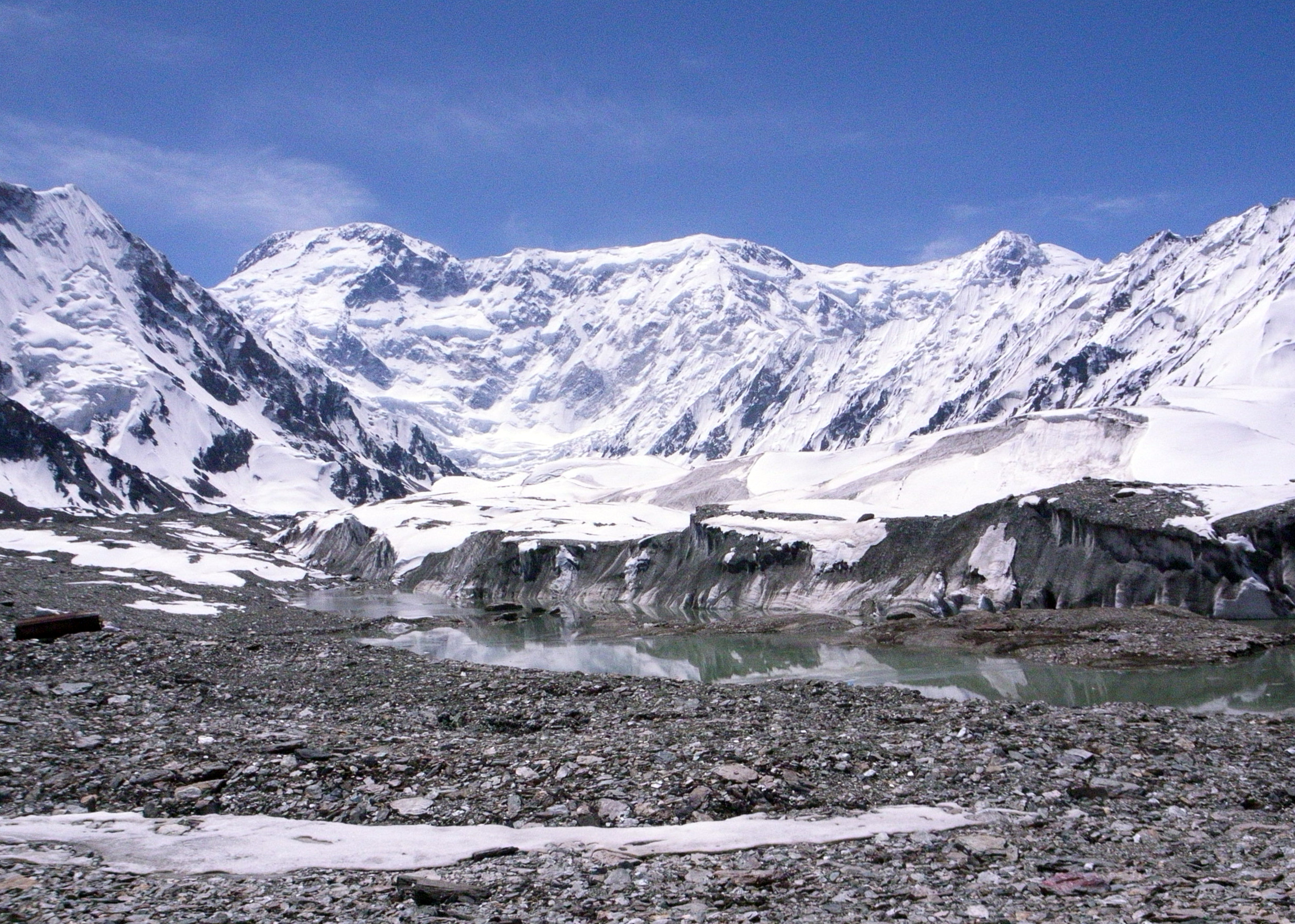
The summit of Jengish Chokusu is the highest point of Kyrgyzstan.

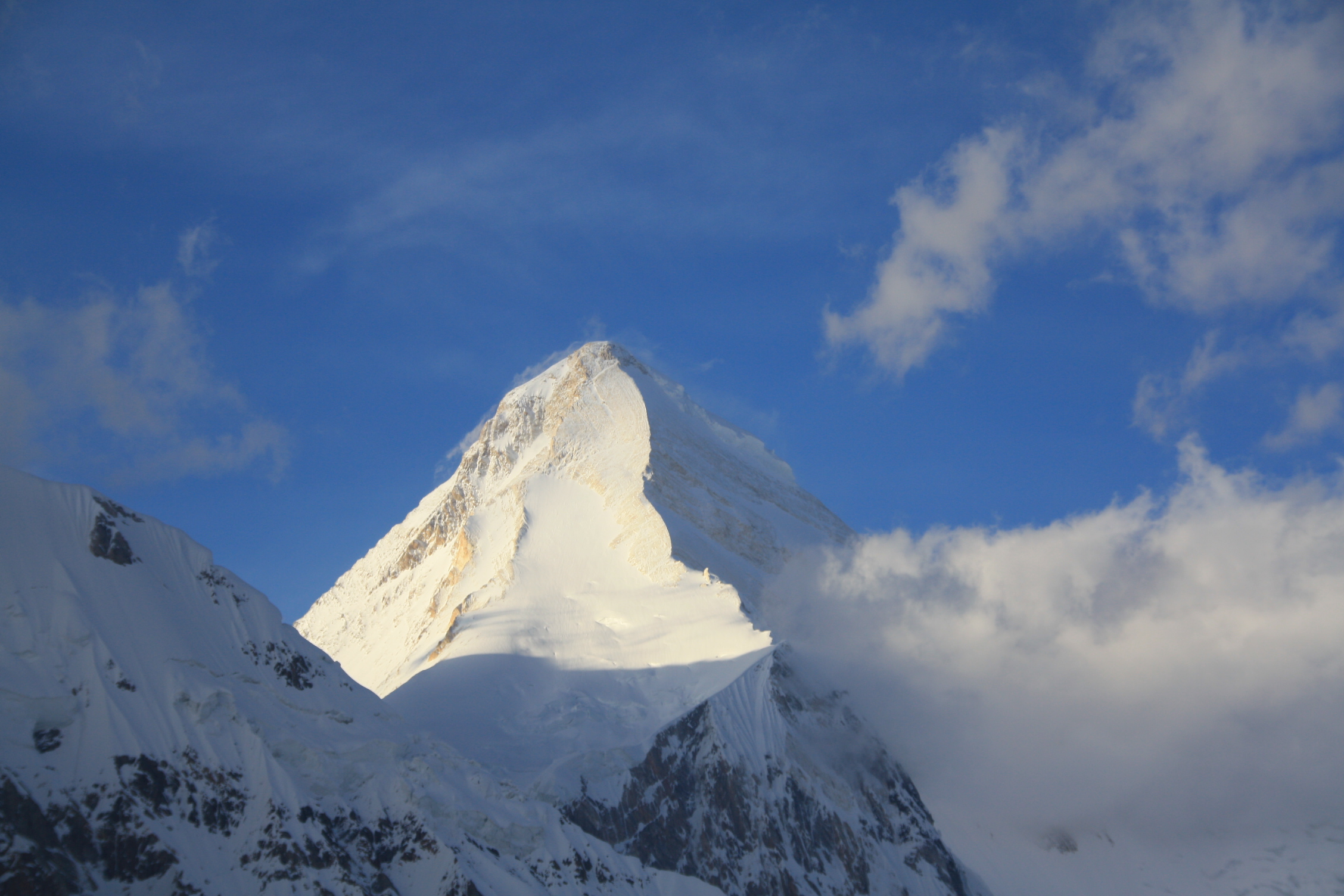
The summit of Khan Tengri is the highest point of Kazakhstan.

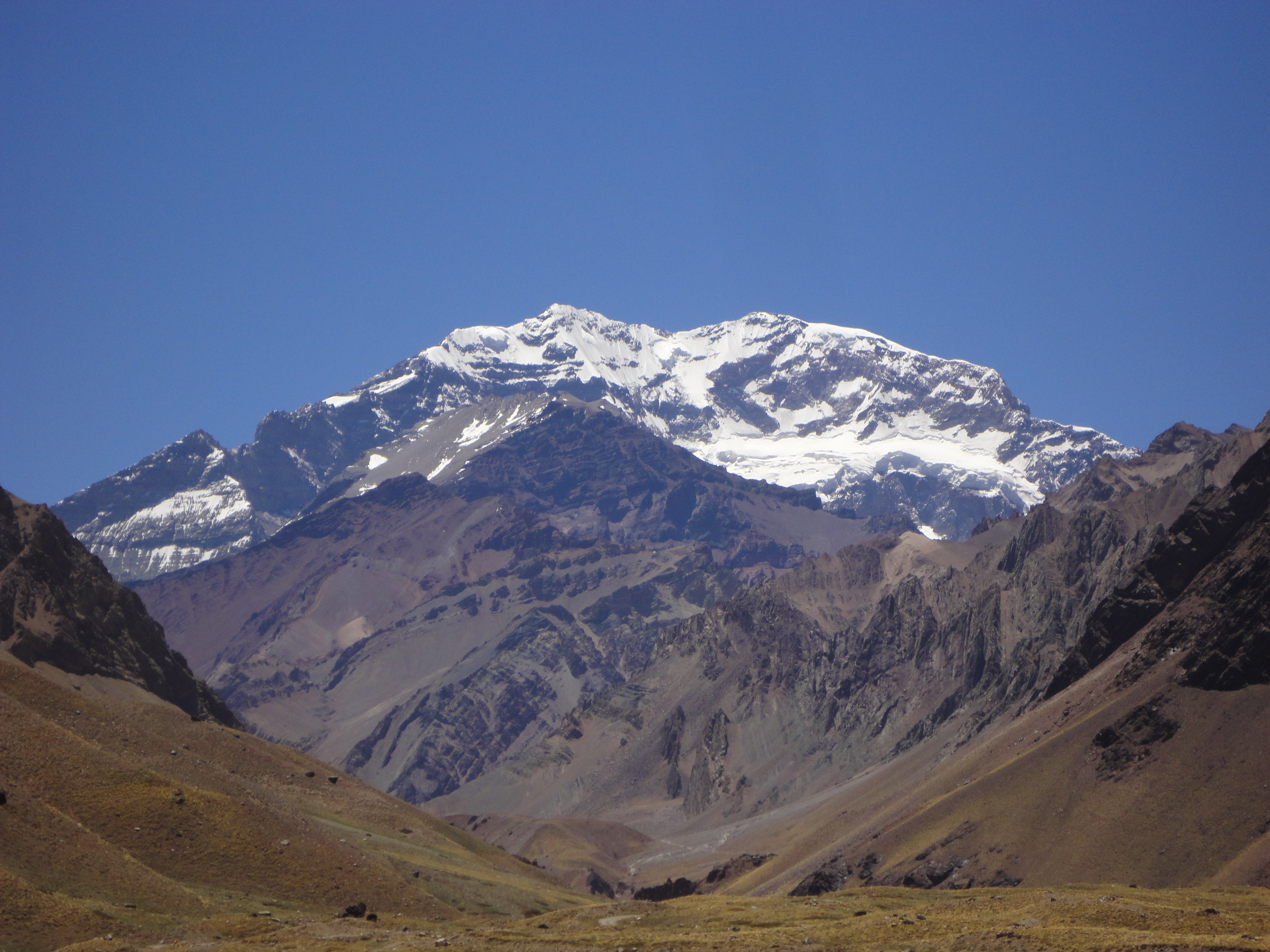
The summit of Aconcagua is the highest point of Argentina, the Americas, the Western Hemisphere, and the Southern Hemisphere.

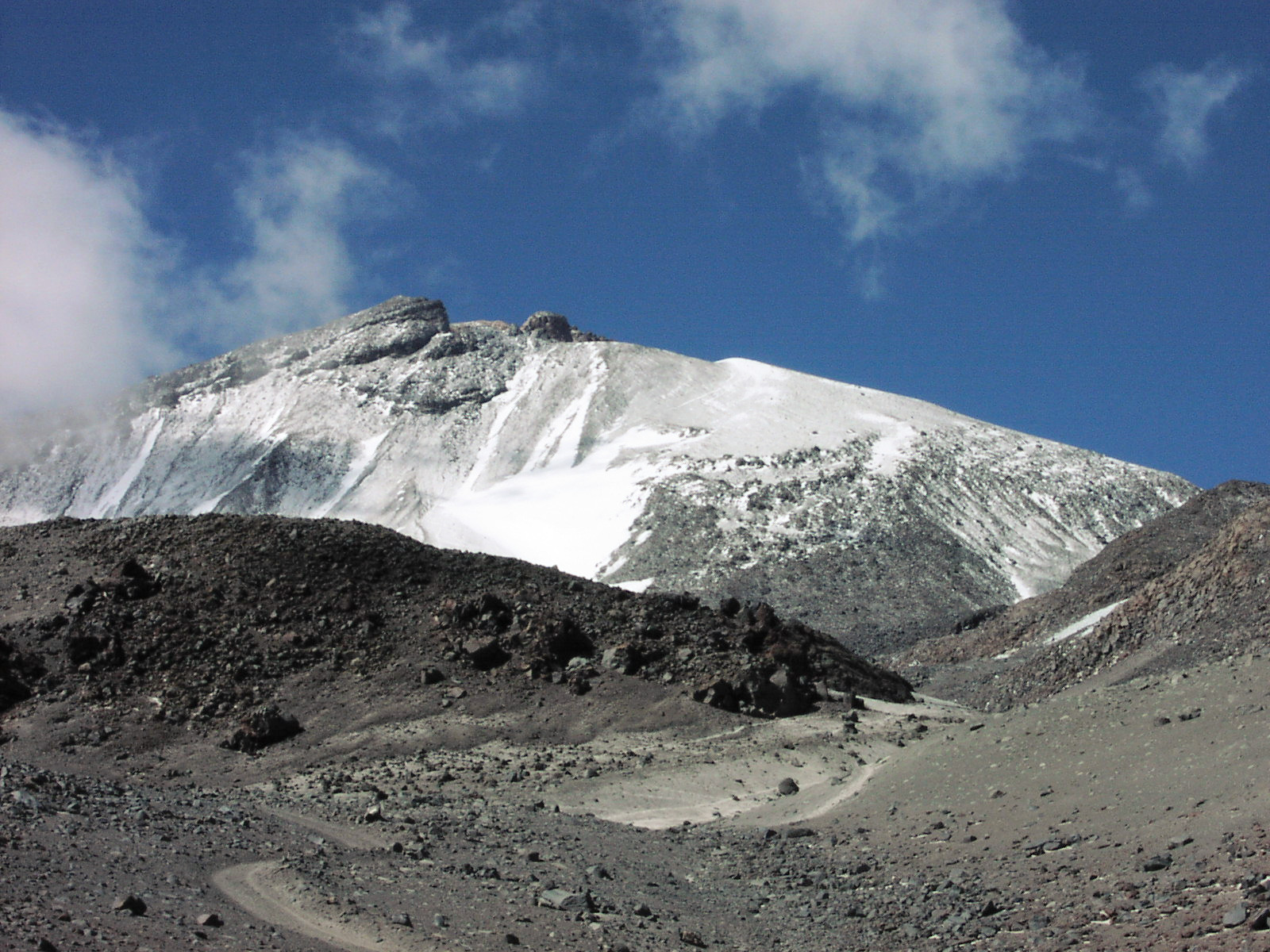
The summit of Ojos del Salado is the highest point of Chile.

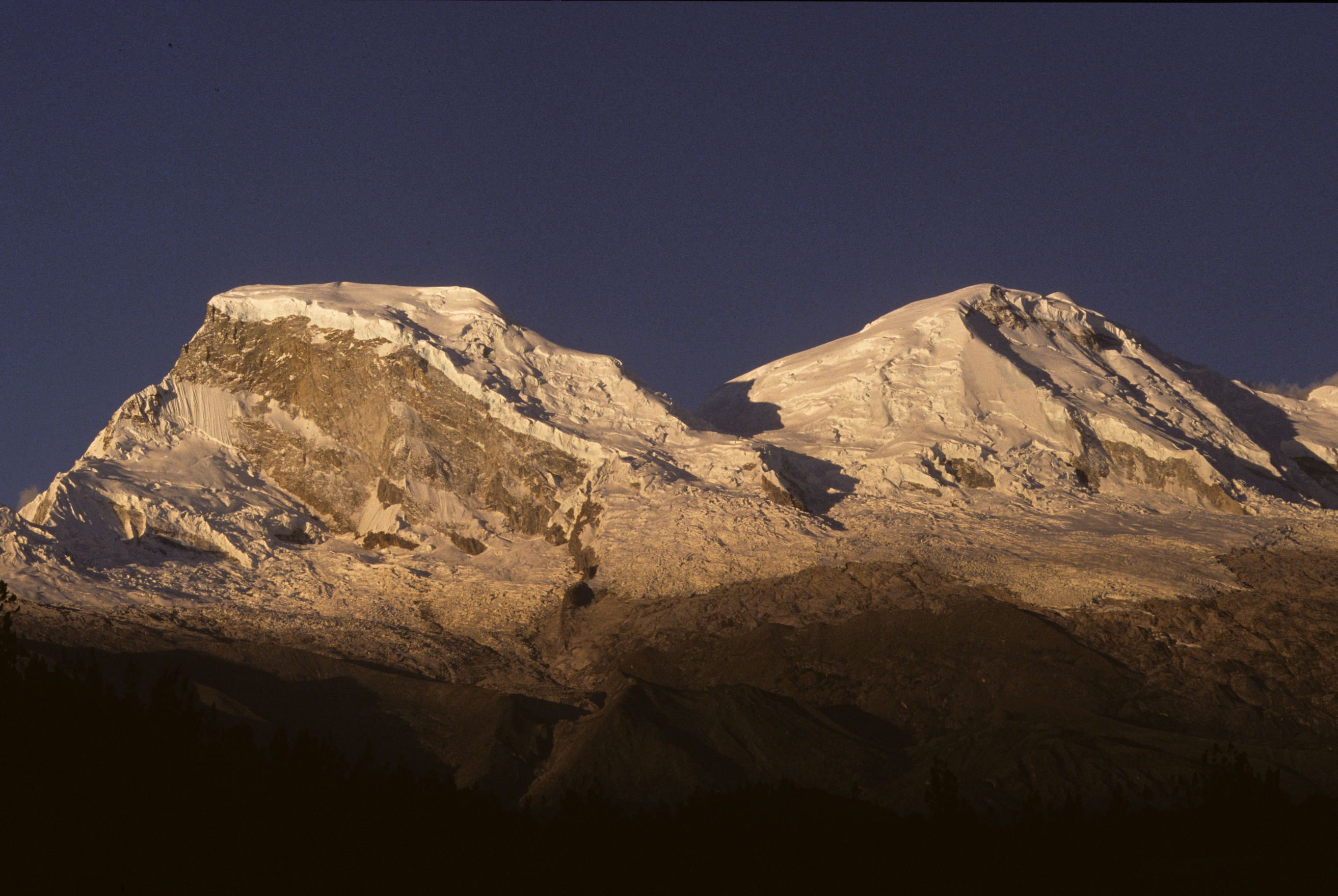
The summit of Huascarán is the highest point of Peru and the Tropics.

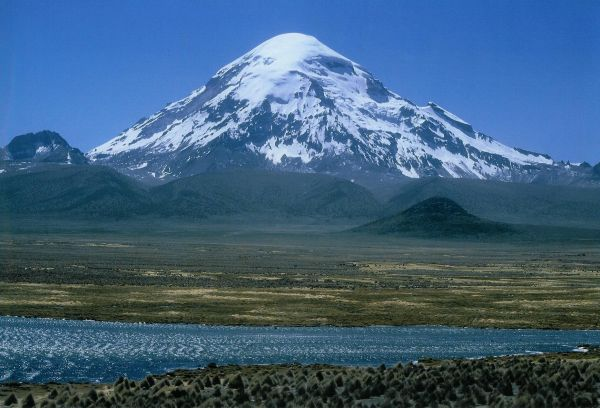
The summit of Nevado Sajama is the highest point of Bolivia.

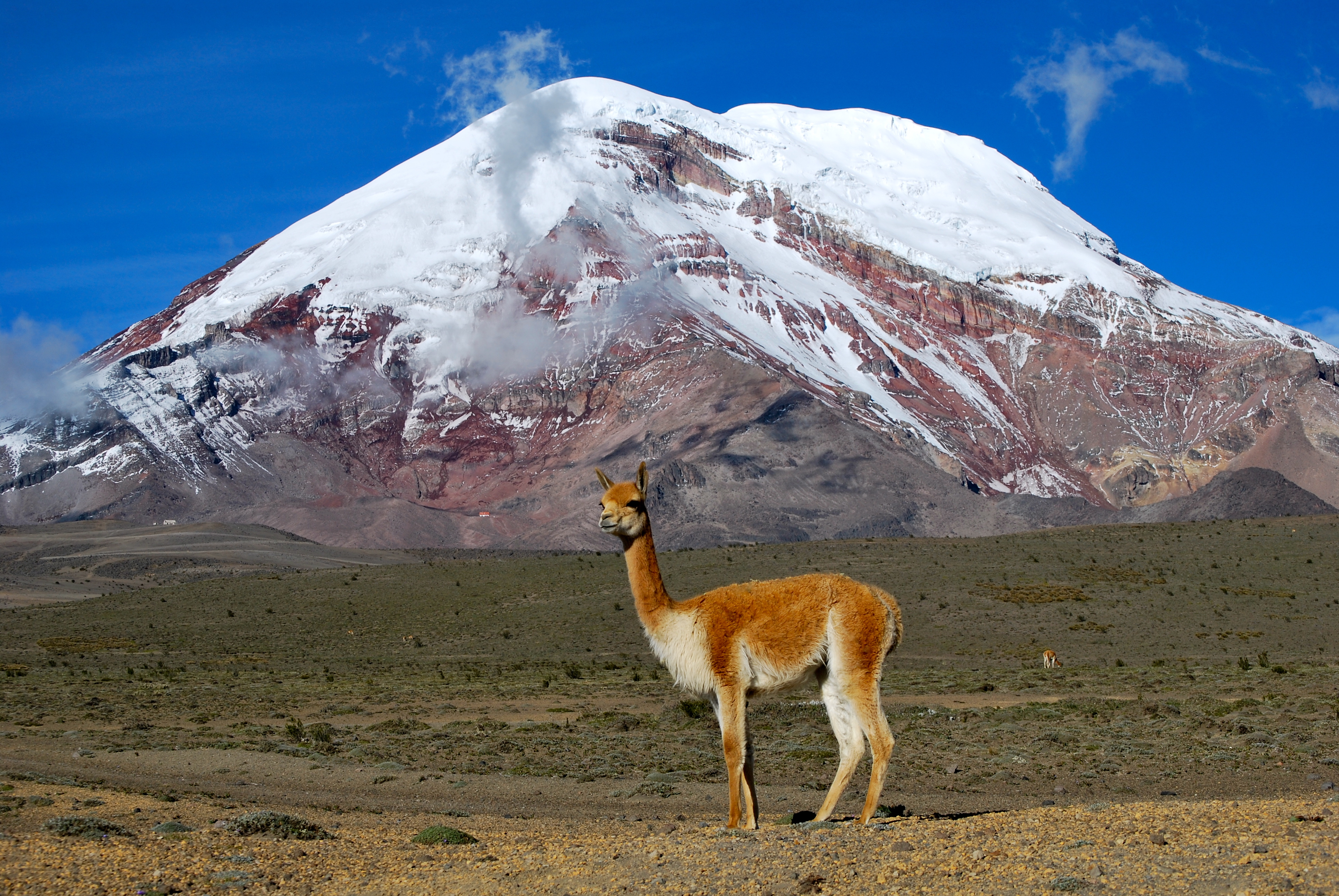
The summit of Chimborazo is the highest point of Ecuador and the farthest point from the center of the Earth.

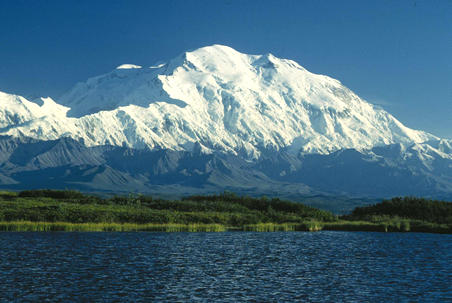
The summit of Denali (federally designated as Mount McKinley) is the highest point of the United States and North America.

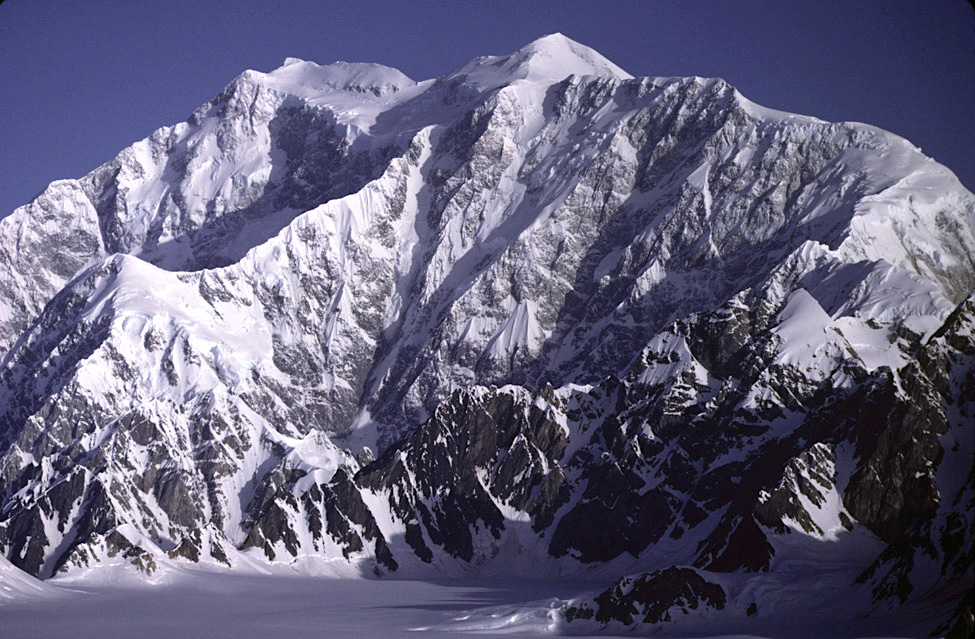
The summit of Mount Logan is the highest point of Canada.

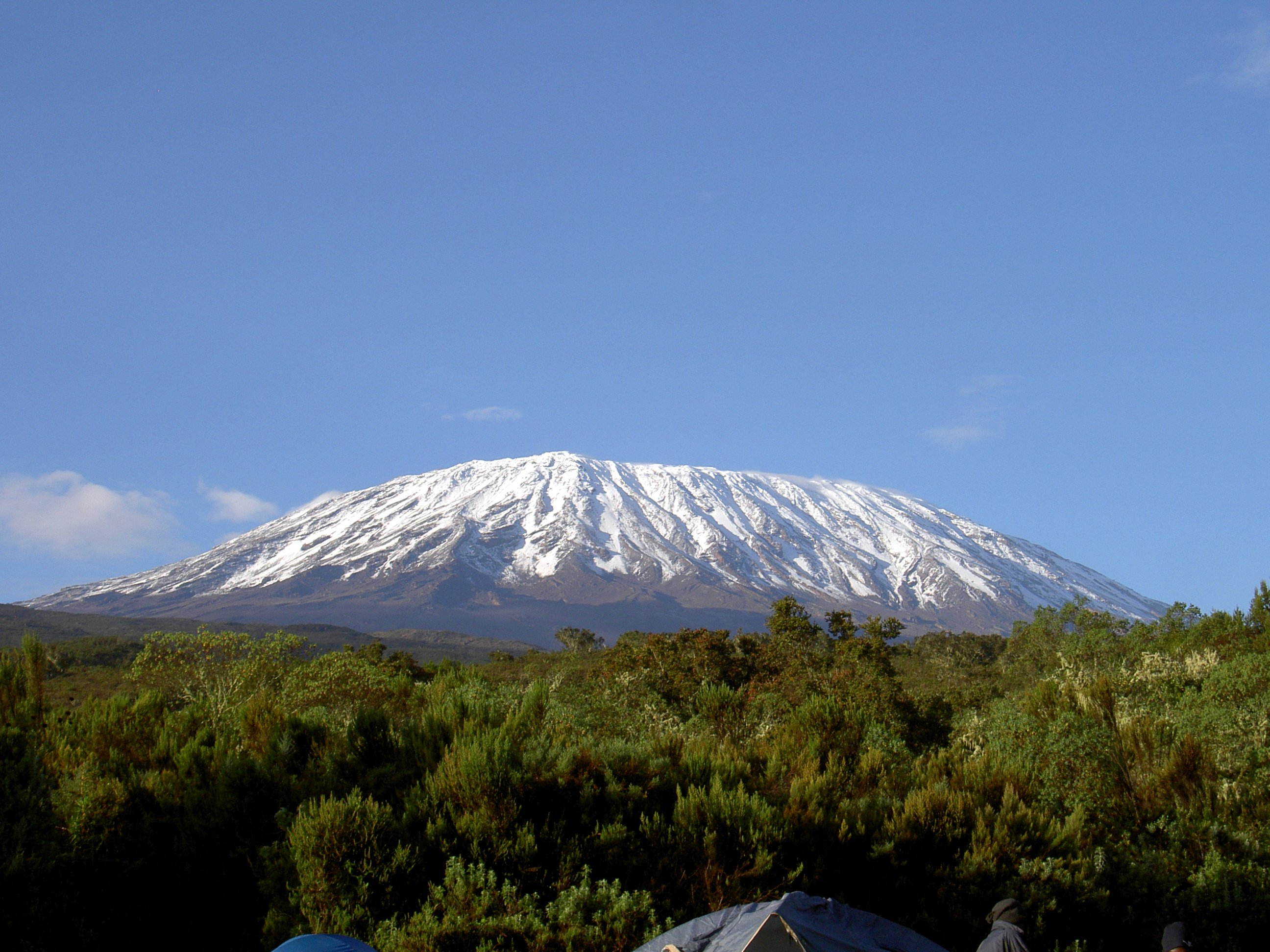
The summit of Kilimanjaro is the highest point of Tanzania and Africa.

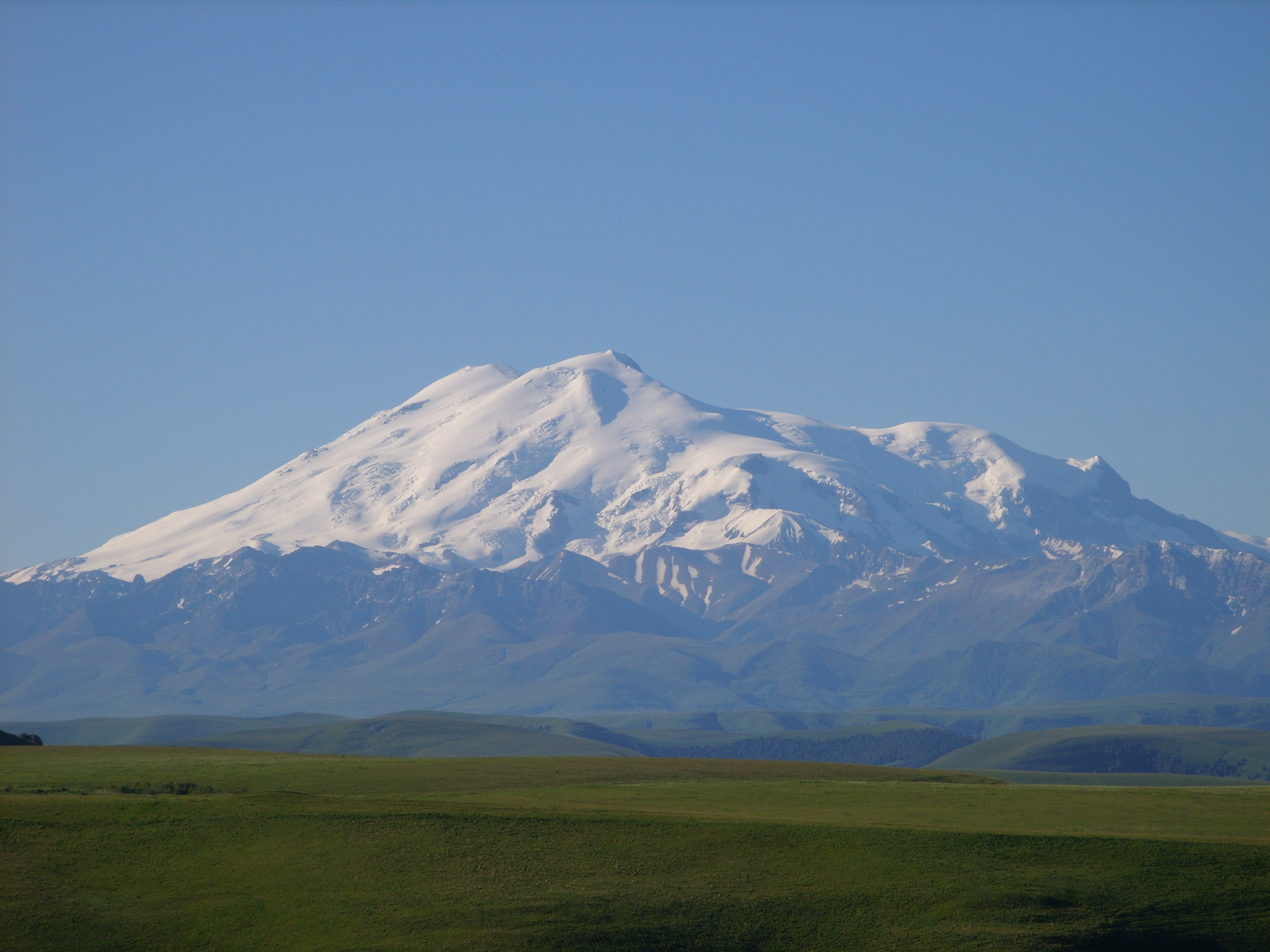
Mount Elbrus, the highest mountain of Russia and Europe.

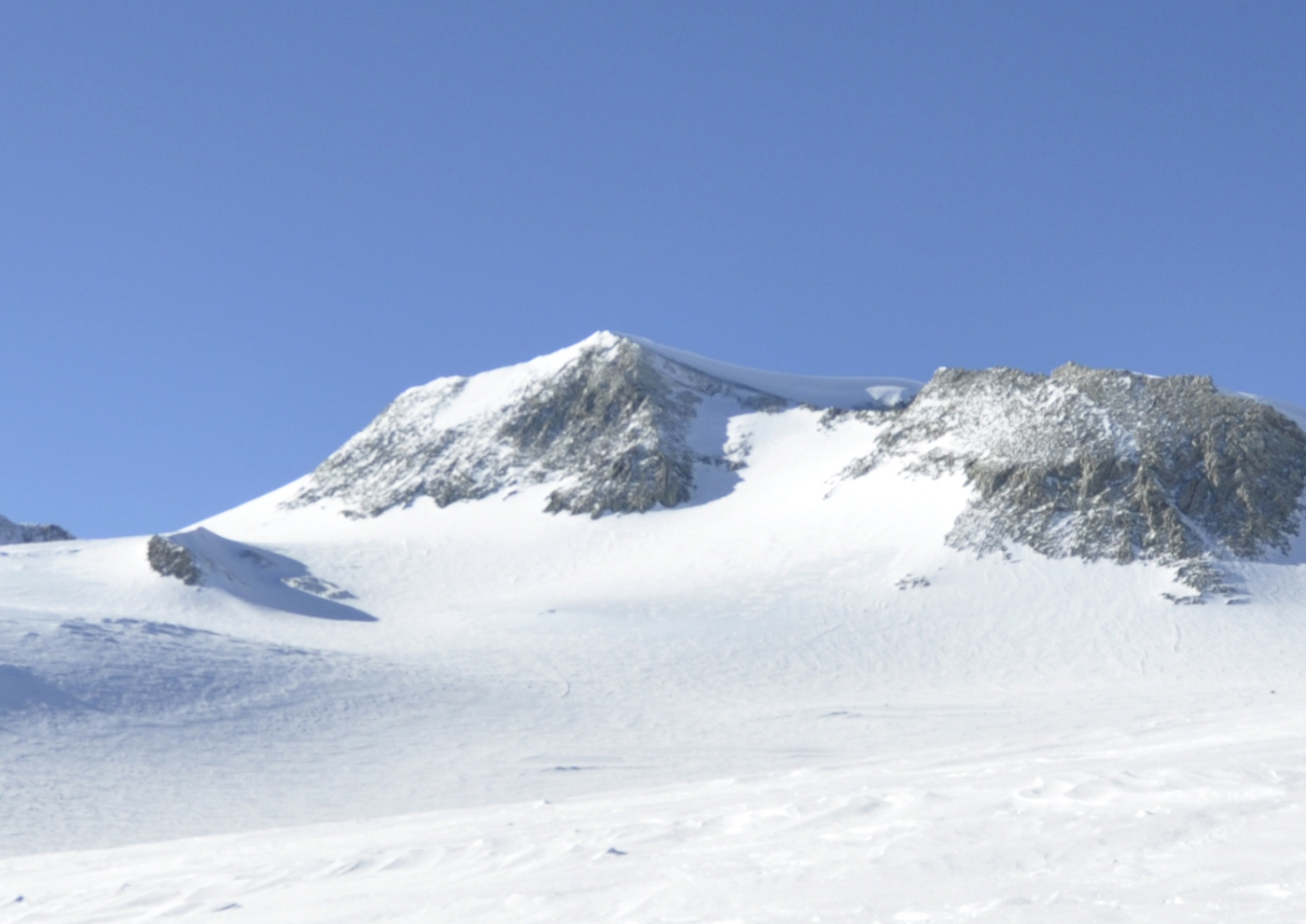
The summit of Mount Vinson is the highest point of Antarctica and the Antarctic.

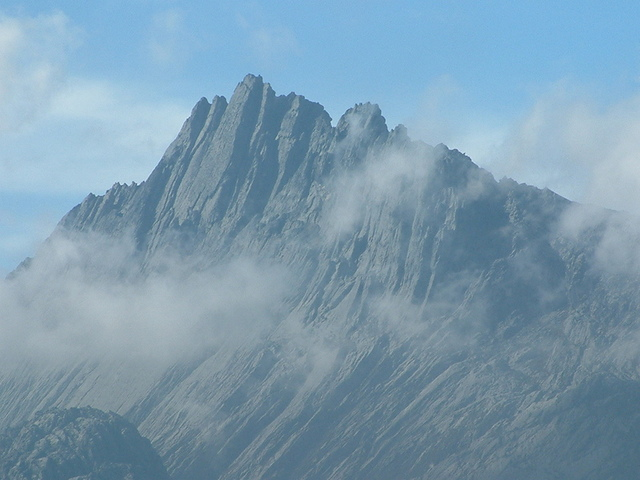
The summit of Puncak Jaya is the highest point of Indonesia, the Island of New Guinea, and all ocean islands.

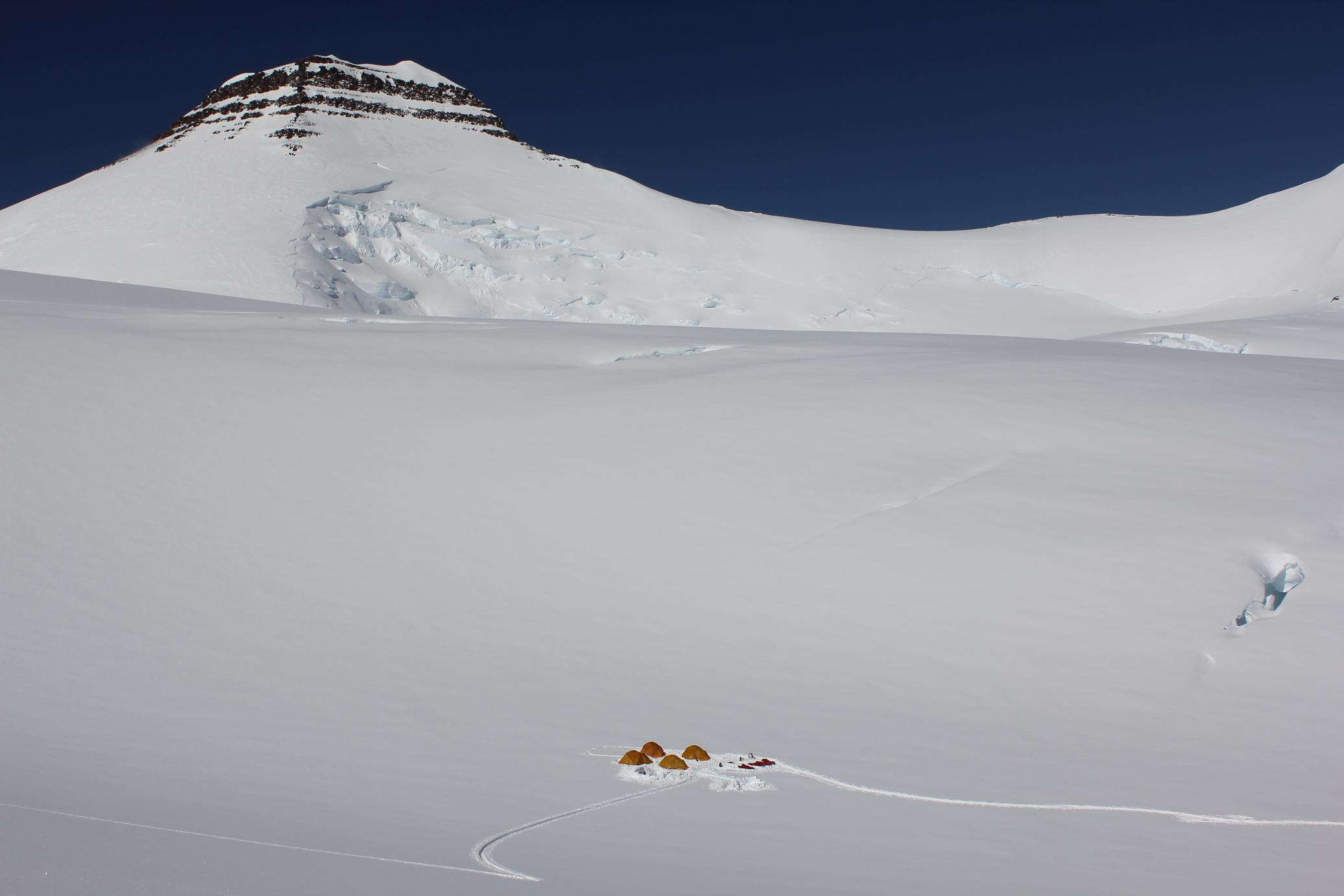
The summit of Gunnbjorn Fjeld is the highest point of Greenland and the Arctic.

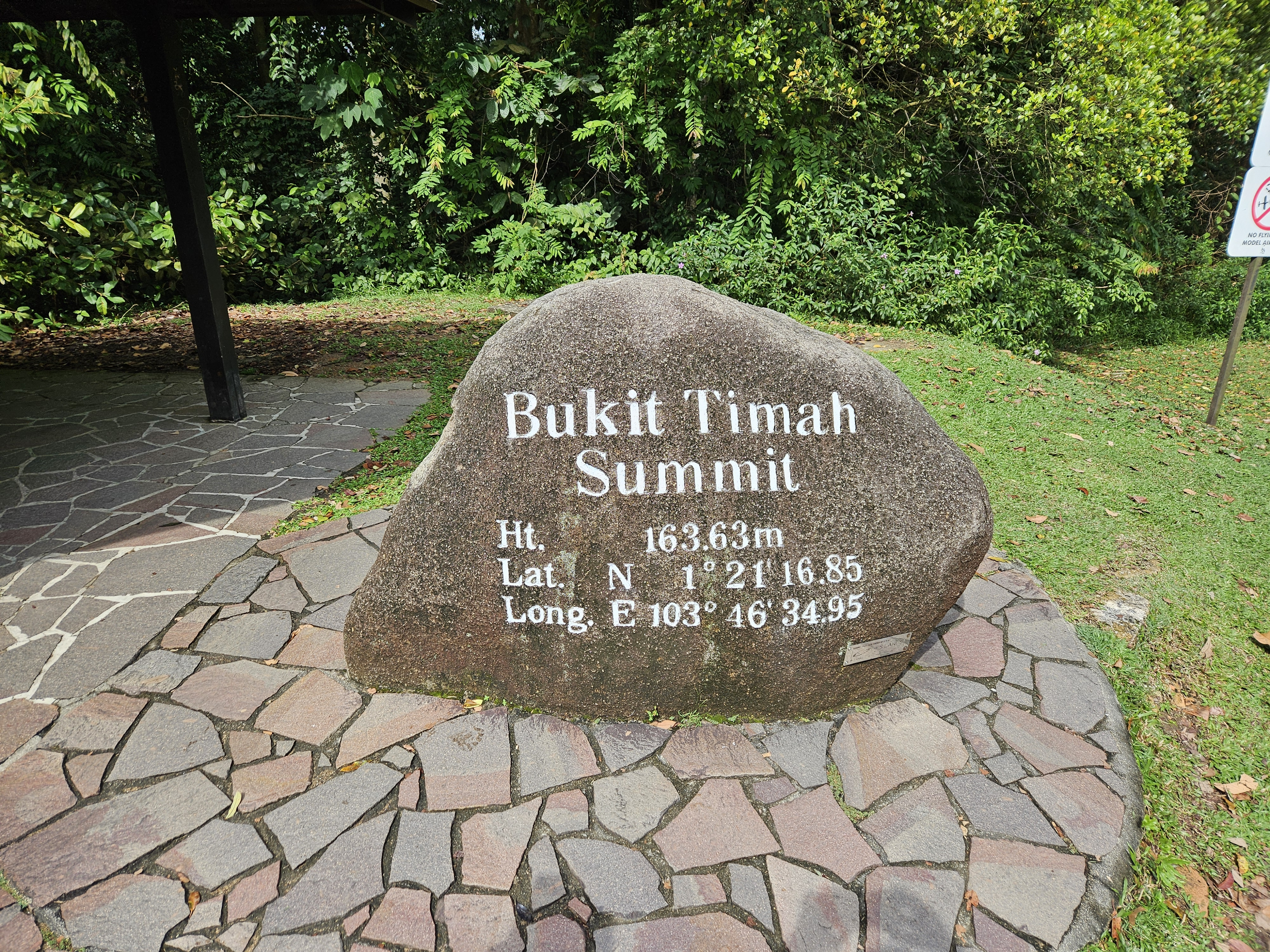
The summit of Bukit Timah Hill is the highest natural point of Singapore.

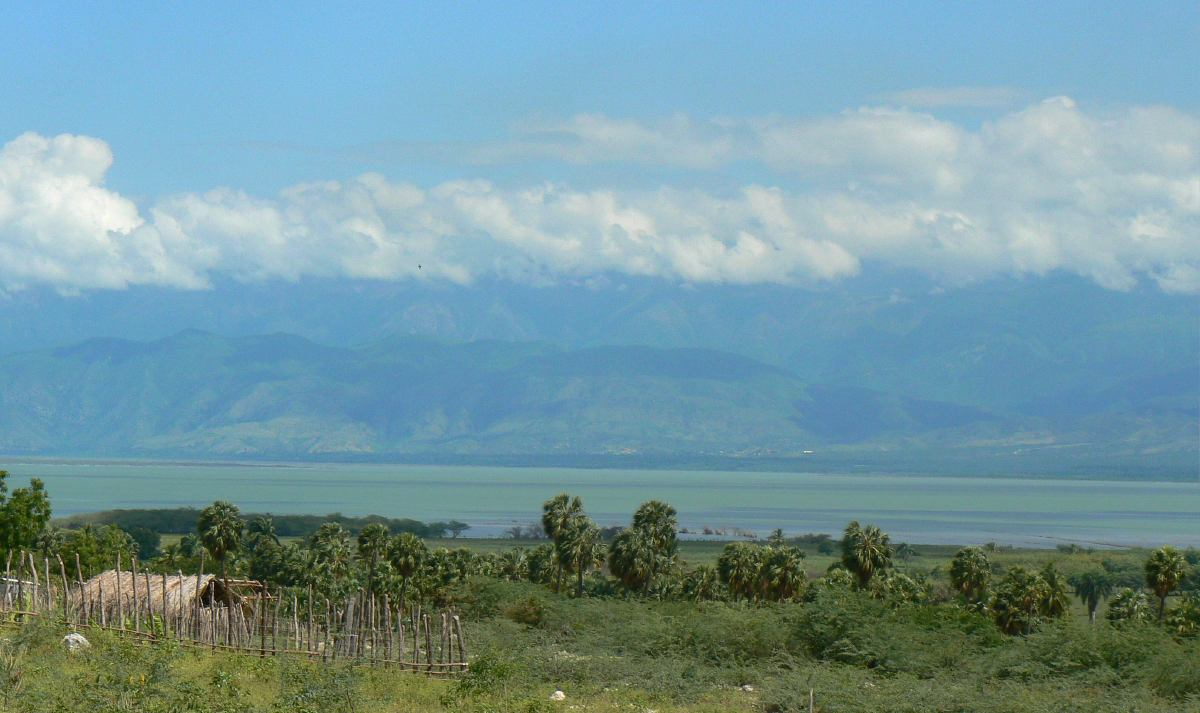
Lago Enriquillo is the lowest point of the Dominican Republic and all ocean islands.

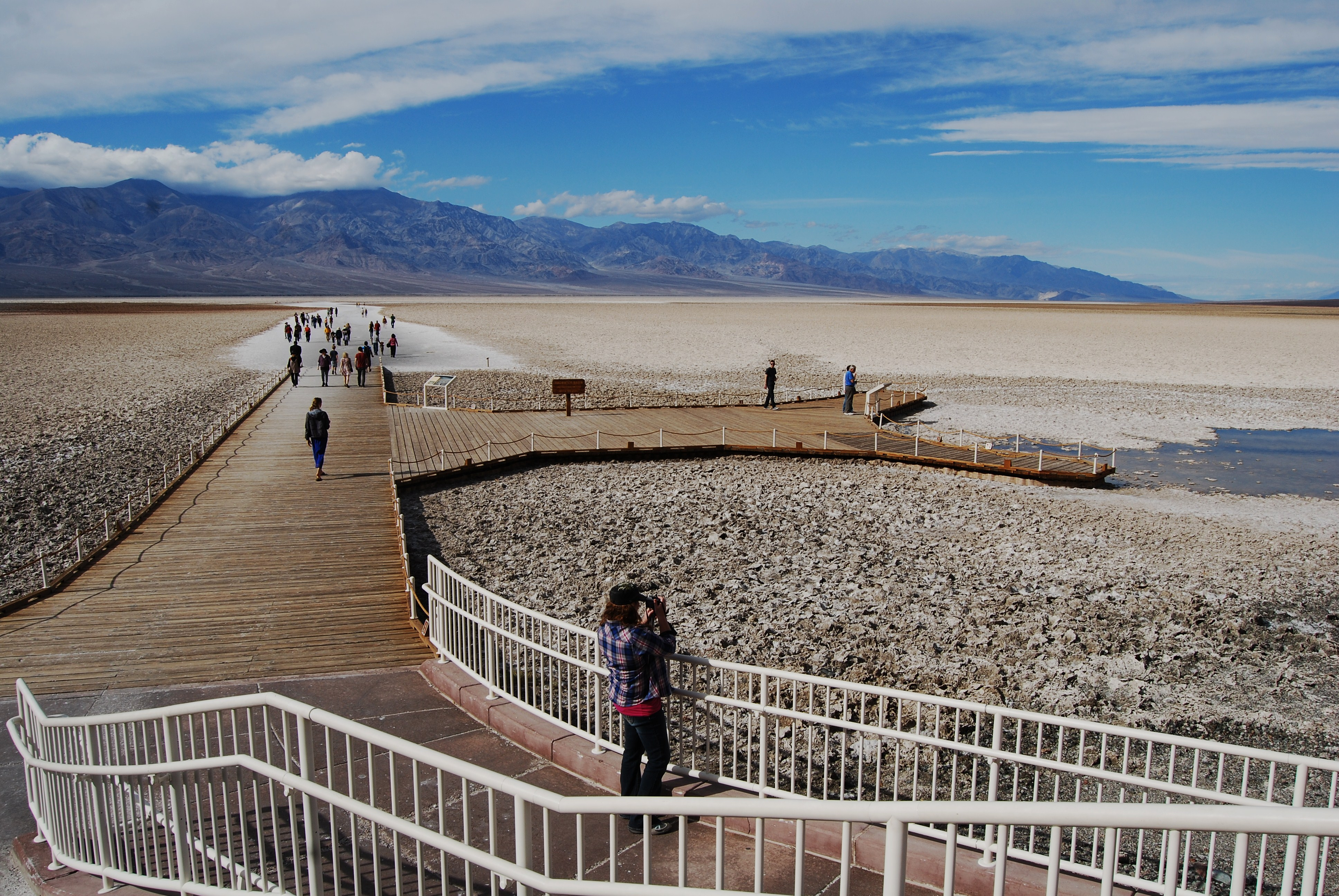
The Badwater Basin in Death Valley is the lowest point of the United States and North America.

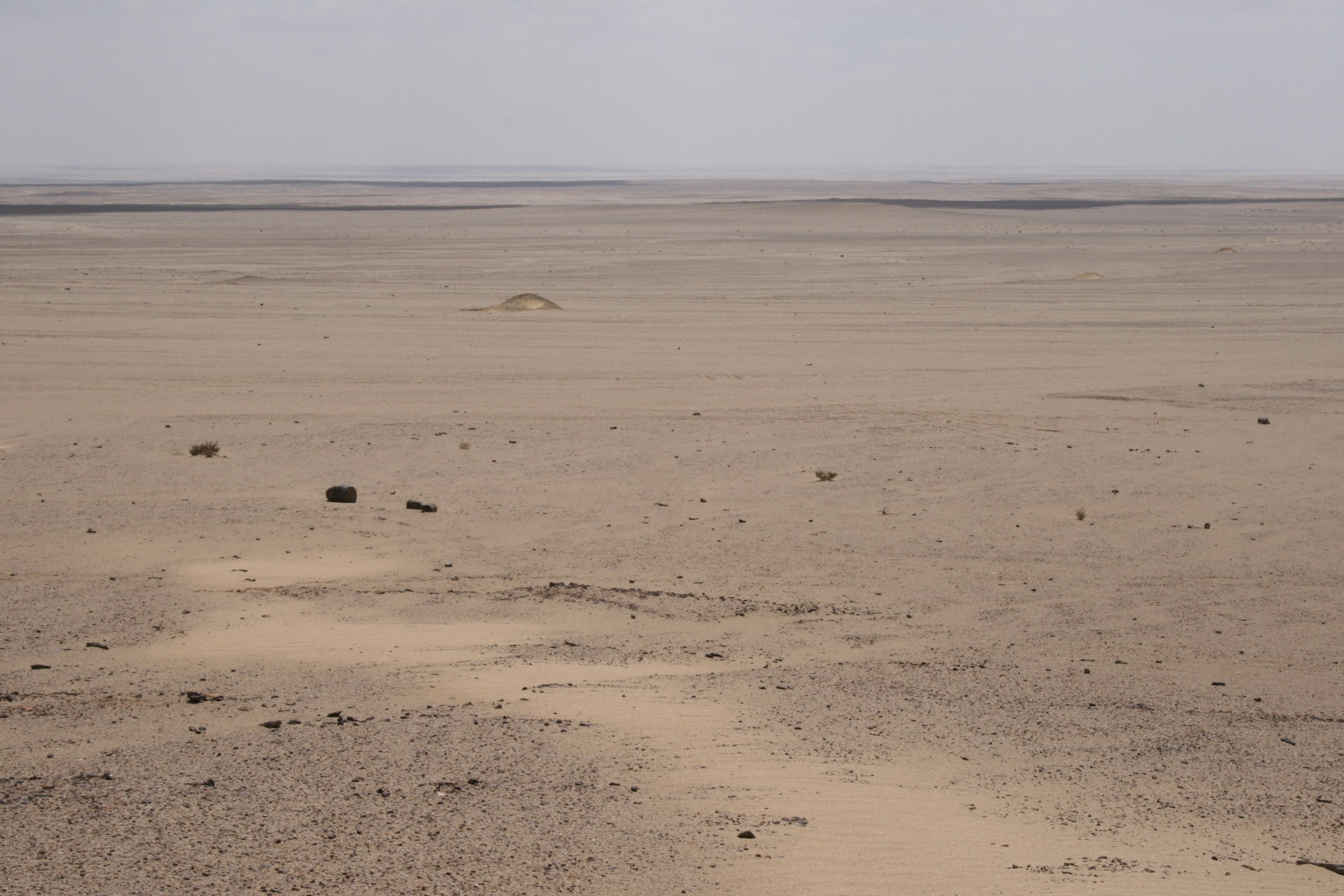
The Qattara Depression is the lowest point in Egypt.

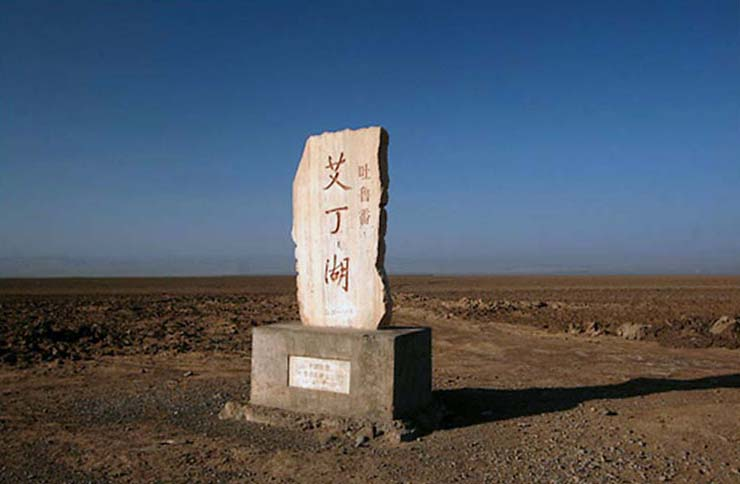
Aydingkol is the lowest point of China.

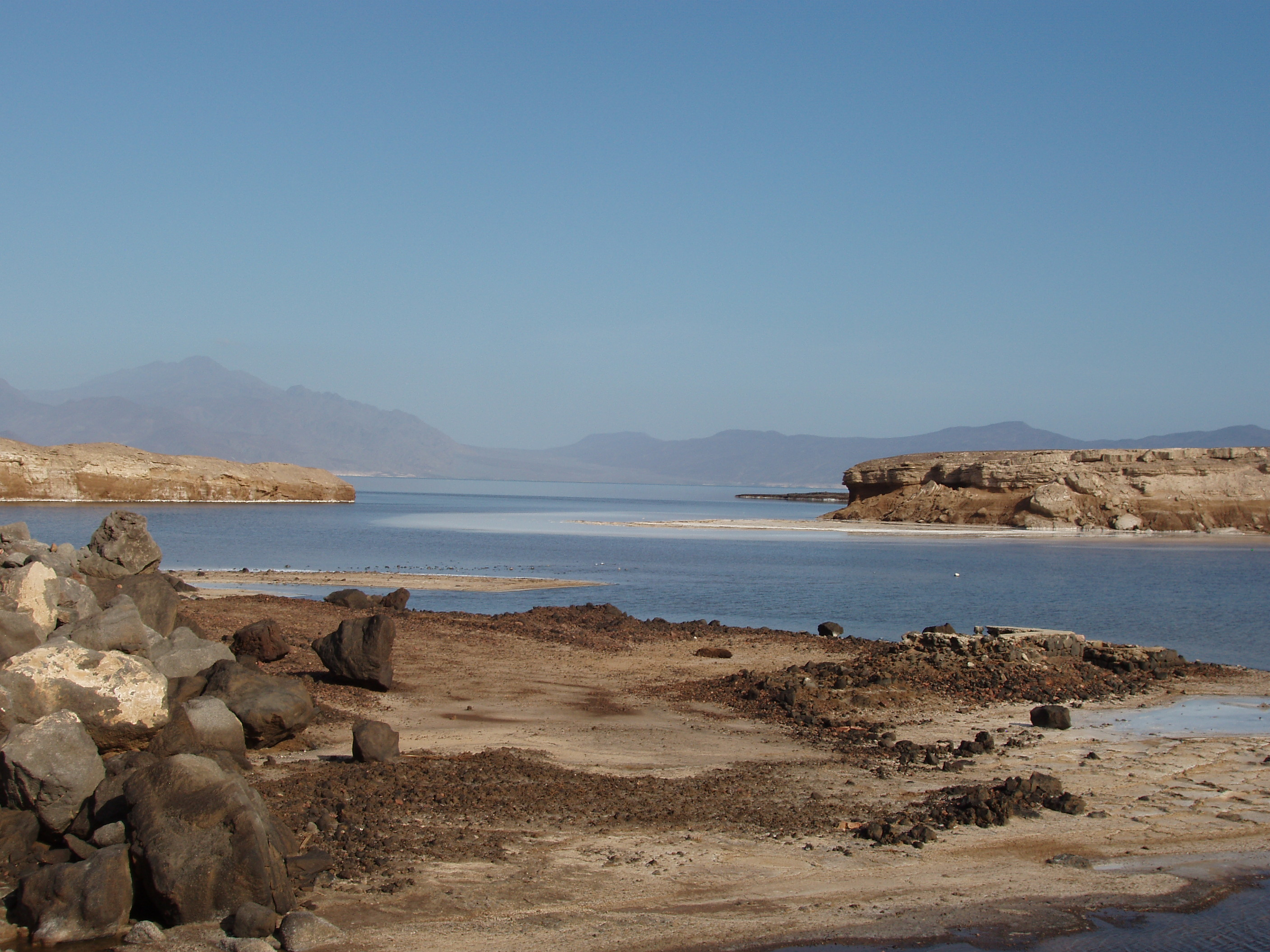
Lake Asal is the lowest point of Djibouti and Africa.

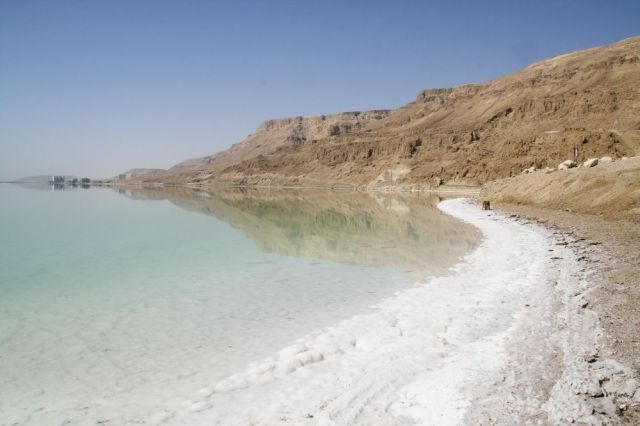
The Dead Sea is the lowest point on Earth.

== See also ==
- List of elevation extremes by region
- List of highest points of countries
  - List of highest points of African countries
  - List of highest points of Asian countries
  - List of highest points of European countries
  - List of highest points of Oceanian countries
  - List of highest points of North American countries
  - List of highest points of South American countries
- List of countries whose highest point is not on the mainland
- List of tallest mountains in the Solar System
- Geodesy
  - Geoid
  - Nadir
  - Summit
  - Topographic elevation
  - Topographic isolation
  - Topographic prominence
- List of countries by average elevation
- Highpointing
- Category:Highest points
- Category:Lowest points
