= List of highest points of African countries =

10 highest points in Africa

This article lists the highest natural elevation of each sovereign state on the continent of Africa defined physiographically.

Not all points in this list are mountains or hills, some are simply elevations that are not distinguishable as geographical features.

Notes are provided where territorial disputes or inconsistencies affect the listings. Egypt has part of their territory and their high point outside of Africa; their non-African high point are listed with a N/A rank entry underneath their continental peak. On the other hand, Spain has part of their territory and their high point inside of Africa.

One partially recognized country with the highest point in Africa is listed and ranked in Italic. For more details see List of states with limited recognition.

Rank	Country	Highest point	Elevation
18	Algeria	Mount Tahat	2,908 m (9,541 ft)
22	Angola	Morro de Môco	2,620 m (8,596 ft)
52	Benin	Mont Sokbaro	658 m (2,159 ft)
40	Botswana	Otse Hill	1,491 m (4,892 ft)
51	Burkina Faso	Tena Kourou	749 m (2,457 ft)
21	Burundi	Southeast of Mount Heha	2,684 m (8,806 ft)
8	Cameroon	Fako on Mount Cameroon	4,040 m (13,255 ft)
20	Cape Verde	Mount Fogo	2,829 m (9,281 ft)
42	Central African Republic	Mont Ngaoui	1,420 m (4,659 ft)
12	Chad	Emi Koussi	3,445 m (11,302 ft)
28	Comoros	Mount Karthala	2,361 m (7,746 ft)
3	Democratic Republic of the Congo	Margherita Peak on Mount Stanley	5,110 m (16,765 ft)
45	Republic of the Congo	Mont Nabeba	1,020 m (3,346 ft)
37	Côte d'Ivoire	Mont Nimba	1,752 m (5,748 ft)
31	Djibouti	Mousa Ali	2,028 m (6,654 ft)
34	Egypt	Gabal Sha'ib El Banat	2,187 m (7,175 ft)
N/A	Egypt	Mount Catherine	2,629 m (8,625 ft)
16	Equatorial Guinea	Pico Basile	3,008 m (9,869 ft)
15	Eritrea	Emba Soira	3,018 m (9,902 ft)
36	Eswatini	Emlembe	1,862 m (6,109 ft)
5	Ethiopia	Ras Dashen	4,550 m (14,928 ft)
44	Gabon	Mont Bengoué	1,070 m (3,510 ft)
55	Gambia	Sare Firasu Hill	50.9 m (167 ft)
49	Ghana	Mount Afadja	885 m (2,904 ft)
38	Guinea	Mont Nimba	1,752 m (5,748 ft)
54	Guinea-Bissau	Monte Torin	262 m (860 ft)
2	Kenya	Batian on Mount Kenya	5,199 m (17,057 ft)
10	Lesotho	Thabana Ntlenyana	3,482 m (11,424 ft)
41	Liberia	Mount Wuteve	1,440 m (4,724 ft)
30	Libya	Bikku Bitti	2,267 m (7,438 ft)
19	Madagascar	Maromokotro	2,876 m (9,436 ft)
17	Malawi	Sapitwa (Mulanje Massif)	3,002 m (9,849 ft)
43	Mali	Hombori Tondo	1,155 m (3,789 ft)
47	Mauritania	Kediet ej Jill	915 m (3,002 ft)
50	Mauritius	Piton de la Petite Rivière Noire	828 m (2,717 ft)
7	Morocco	Jbel Toubkal	4,165 m (13,665 ft)
26	Mozambique	Monte Binga	2,436 m (7,992 ft)
23	Namibia	Königstein	2,606 m (8,550 ft)
33	Niger	Mont Idoukal-n-Taghès	2,022 m (6,634 ft)
27	Nigeria	Chappal Waddi	2,419 m (7,936 ft)
6	Rwanda	Mount Karisimbi	4,507 m (14,787 ft)
32	São Tomé and Príncipe	Pico de São Tomé	2,024 m (6,640 ft)
53	Senegal	Baunez ridge near Nepen Diakha	648 m (2,126 ft)
48	Seychelles	Morne Seychellois	905 m (2,969 ft)
35	Sierra Leone	Mount Bintumani (Loma Mansa)	1,948 m (6,391 ft)
25	Somalia	Shimbiris	2,460 m (8,071 ft)
11	South Africa	Mafadi	3,450 m (11,319 ft)
13	South Sudan	Kinyeti	3,187 m (10,456 ft)
14	Sudan	Deriba Caldera	3,042 m (9,980 ft)
9	Spain	Teide	3,718 m (12,198 ft)
1	Tanzania	Mount Kilimanjaro	5,892 m (19,331 ft)
46	Togo	Mont Agou	986 m (3,235 ft)
39	Tunisia	Jebel ech Chambi	1,544 m (5,066 ft)
4	Uganda	Margherita Peak on Mount Stanley	5,110 m (16,765 ft)
N/A	Western Sahara	Tikhzoukhane	605 m (1,985 ft)
29	Zambia	Unnamed location in Mafinga Hills	2,329 m (7,641 ft)
24	Zimbabwe	Mount Nyangani	2,592 m (8,504 ft)

== See also ==
- List of elevation extremes by country
  - List of highest points of Asian countries
  - List of highest points of European countries
  - List of highest points of North American countries
  - List of highest points of Oceanian countries
  - List of highest points of South American countries
