= List of highest points of North American countries =

Topographic map of North America.

This article lists the highest natural elevation of each sovereign state on the continent of North America defined physiographically.

Rank	Country	Highest point	Elevation
23	Antigua and Barbuda	Boggy Peak	402 m (1,319 ft)
25	Bahamas	Mount Alvernia	63 m (207 ft)
24	Barbados	Mount Hillaby	340 m (1,115 ft)
17	Belize	Doyle's Delight	1,174 m (3,852 ft)
2	Canada	Mount Logan	5,959 m (19,551 ft)
5	Costa Rica	Cerro Chirripó	3,819 m (12,530 ft)
14	Cuba	Pico Turquino	1,974 m (6,476 ft)
15	Dominica	Morne Diablotins	1,447 m (4,747 ft)
8	Dominican Republic	Pico Duarte	3,098 m (10,164 ft)
10	El Salvador	Cerro El Pital	2,730 m (8,957 ft)
6	Denmark (Greenland)	Gunnbjørn Fjeld	3,694 m (12,119 ft)
22	Grenada	Mount Saint Catherine	840 m (2,756 ft)
4	Guatemala	Volcán Tajumulco	4,220 m (13,845 ft)
11	Haiti	Pic la Selle	2,674 m (8,773 ft)
9	Honduras	Cerro Las Minas	2,870 m (9,416 ft)
12	Jamaica	Blue Mountain Peak	2,256 m (7,402 ft)
3	Mexico	Pico de Orizaba	5,636 m (18,491 ft)
13	Nicaragua	Mogotón	2,106 m (6,909 ft)
7	Panama	Volcán Barú	3,474 m (11,398 ft)
21	Netherlands (Saba)	Mount Scenery	870 m (2,854 ft)
18	Saint Kitts and Nevis	Mount Liamuiga	1,156 m (3,793 ft)
19	Saint Lucia	Mount Gimie	950 m (3,117 ft)
16	Saint Vincent and the Grenadines	La Soufrière	1,234 m (4,049 ft)
20	Trinidad and Tobago	El Cerro del Aripo	940 m (3,084 ft)
1	United States of America	Denali	6,190 m (20,310 ft)

== See also ==
- List of elevation extremes by country
  - List of highest points of African countries
  - List of highest points of Asian countries
  - List of highest points of European countries
  - List of highest points of Oceanian countries
  - List of highest points of South American countries
