= List of highest points of Asian countries =

Topography of Asia

This article lists the highest natural elevation of each sovereign state on the continent of Asia defined physiographically. States sometimes associated with Asia politically and culturally, but not geographically part of Asia, are not included in this list of physical features (with the exception of Cyprus - marked with a N/A rank entry).

Not all points in this list are mountains or hills, some are simply elevations that are not distinguishable as geographical features.

Notes are provided where territorial disputes or inconsistencies affect the listings. Some countries such as Azerbaijan, Georgia, and Russia (Elbrus) have part of their territory and their high points outside of Asia; their non-Asian high points are listed with a N/A rank entry underneath their continental peak.

Three other entries of partially recognized countries with highest points in Asia are listed and ranked in Italic. For more details see List of states with limited recognition.

Rank	Country	Highest point	Elevation
6	Afghanistan	Noshaq	7,492 m (24,580 ft)
N/A	Armenia	Aragats	4,090 m (13,419 ft)
N/A	Azerbaijan	Mount Bazardüzü	4,466 m (14,652 ft)
44	Bahrain	Mountain of Smoke	122 m (400 ft)
40	Bangladesh	Saka Haphong	1,052 m (3,451 ft)
4	Bhutan	Gangkhar Puensum	7,570 m (24,836 ft)
37	Brunei	Pagon Hill	1,850 m (6,070 ft)
38	Cambodia	Phnom Aural	1,810 m (5,938 ft)
1	Nepal	Mount Everest	8,848 m (29,029 ft)
N/A	Cyprus	Mount Olympus	1,951 m (6,401 ft)
26	East Timor	Tatamailau	2,963 m (9,721 ft)
31	Egypt	Mount Catherine	2,629 m (8,625 ft)
N/A	Georgia	Shkhara	5,201 m (17,064 ft)
3	India	Kangchenjunga	8,586 m (28,169 ft)
12	Indonesia	Puncak Jaya	4,884 m (16,024 ft)
10	Iran	Mount Damavand	5,610 m (18,406 ft)
20	Iraq	Cheekha Dar	3,611 m (11,847 ft)
39	Israel	Mount Hermon	2,236 m (7,336 ft)
18	Japan	Mount Fuji	3,776 m (12,388 ft)
36	Jordan	Jabal Umm ad Dami	1,854 m (6,083 ft)
8	Kazakhstan	Khan Tengri	7,010 m (22,999 ft)
30	North Korea	Paektu Mountain	2,744 m (9,003 ft)
34	South Korea	Hallasan	1,950 m (6,398 ft)
42	Kuwait	Mutla Ridge	306 m (1,004 ft)
7	Kyrgyzstan	Jengish Chokusu	7,439 m (24,406 ft)
28	Laos	Phou Bia	2,817 m (9,242 ft)
23	Lebanon	Qurnat as Sawda'	3,088 m (10,131 ft)
16	Malaysia	Gunung Kinabalu	4,095 m (13,435 ft)
46	Maldives	Mount Villingili	5 m (16 ft)
15	Mongolia	Khüiten Peak	4,374 m (14,350 ft)
9	Myanmar	Hkakabo Razi	5,881 m (19,295 ft)
1	China	Mount Everest	8,848 m (29,029 ft)
24	Oman	Jebel Shams	3,009 m (9,872 ft)
2	Pakistan	K2	8,611 m (28,251 ft)
41	Palestine	Mount Nabi Yunis	1,030 m (3,379 ft)
27	Philippines	Mount Apo	2,954 m (9,692 ft)
45	Qatar	Qurayn Abu al Bawl	103 m (338 ft)
13	Russia	Klyuchevskaya Sopka	4,750 m (15,584 ft)
N/A	Russia	Mount Elbrus	5,642 m (18,510 ft)
25	Saudi Arabia	Jabal Ferwa	3,002 m (9,849 ft)
43	Singapore	Bukit Timah Hill	164 m (538 ft)
33	Sri Lanka	Pidurutalagala	2,524 m (8,281 ft)
29	Syria	Jabal el-Sheikh	2,814 m (9,232 ft)
17	Taiwan	Yu Shan	3,952 m (12,966 ft)
5	Tajikistan	Ismoil Somoni Peak	7,495 m (24,590 ft)
32	Thailand	Doi Inthanon	2,565 m (8,415 ft)
11	Turkey	Mount Ararat (Ağrı Dağı)	5,137 m (16,854 ft)
22	Turkmenistan	Aýrybaba	3,139 m (10,299 ft)
35	United Arab Emirates	Jebel Jais	1,910 m (6,266 ft)
14	Uzbekistan	Alpomish Peak	4,668 m (15,315 ft)
21	Vietnam	Fansipan	3,143 m (10,312 ft)
19	Yemen	Jabal An-Nabi Shu'ayb	3,666 m (12,028 ft)

== See also ==
- List of elevation extremes by country
  - List of highest points of African countries
  - List of highest points of European countries
  - List of highest points of North American countries
  - List of highest points of Oceanian countries
  - List of highest points of South American countries
- Geography of Asia
- Lists of mountains by region#Asia – a list of Asian mountain lists
- Extreme points of Asia
