= List of highest points of South American countries =

Topographic map of South America

This article lists the highest natural elevation of each sovereign state on the continent of South America, defined physiographically.

Rank	Country or Region	Highest point	Elevation
1	Argentina	Aconcagua	6,962 m (22,841 ft)
2	Chile	Ojos del Salado	6,893 m (22,615 ft)
3	Peru	Huascarán	6,768 m (22,205 ft)
4	Bolivia	Nevado Sajama	6,542 m (21,463 ft)
5	Ecuador	Chimborazo	6,267 m (20,561 ft)
6	Colombia	Pico Cristóbal Colón	5,775 m (18,947 ft)
7	Venezuela	Pico Bolívar	4,981 m (16,342 ft)
8	Brazil	Pico da Neblina	2,995 m (9,826 ft)
9	United Kingdom (South Georgia)	Mount Paget (Note: Paget is the highest mountain in South Georgia and is the highest peak of any British territory excluding Antarctic claims, and is higher than Ben Nevis in Scotland.)	2,934 m (9,626 ft)
10	Guyana	Mount Roraima (Guyana High Point)	2,772 m (9,094 ft)
11	Suriname	Julianatop	1,230 m (4,035 ft)
12	Paraguay	Cerro Tres Kandú	842 m (2,762 ft)
13	Uruguay	Cerro Catedral	514 m (1,686 ft)

== See also ==
- List of elevation extremes by country
  - List of highest points of African countries
  - List of highest points of Asian countries
  - List of highest points of European countries
  - List of highest points of North American countries
  - List of highest points of Oceanian countries
