= List of highest points of Oceanian countries =

Topography of Oceania

This page lists the 'highest natural elevation of each sovereign state on the continent of Oceania defined physiographically. States sometimes associated with Oceania politically and culturally, but not geographically part of Oceania, are not included in this list of physical features.

Not all points in this list are mountains or hills, some are simply elevations that are not distinguishable as geographical features.

| Rank | Country | Highest point | Elevation |
|---|---|---|---|
| 5 | Australia | Mount Kosciuszko | 2,228 m (7,310 ft) |
| 10 | Federated States of Micronesia | Nanlaud | 782 m (2,566 ft) |
| 8 | Fiji | Mount Tomanivi | 1,324 m (4,344 ft) |
| 1 | Indonesia | Puncak Jaya | 4,884 m (16,024 ft) |
| 12 | Kiribati | Banaba | 81 m (266 ft) |
| 14 | Marshall Islands | Likiep | 10 m (33 ft) |
| 13 | Nauru | Command Ridge | 65 m (213 ft) |
| 3 | New Zealand | Aoraki / Mount Cook | 3,724 m (12,218 ft) |
| 11 | Palau | Mount Ngerchelchuus | 242 m (794 ft) |
| 2 | Papua New Guinea | Mount Wilhelm | 4,509 m (14,793 ft) |
| 7 | Samoa | Silisili | 1,857 m (6,093 ft) |
| 4 | Solomon Islands | Mount Popomanaseu | 2,335 m (7,661 ft) |
| 9 | Tonga | Kao | 1,033 m (3,389 ft) |
| 15 | Tuvalu | Niulakita | 5 m (16 ft) |
| 6 | Vanuatu | Mount Tabwemasana | 1,877 m (6,158 ft) |

== See also ==
- List of elevation extremes by country
  - List of highest points of African countries
  - List of highest points of Asian countries
  - List of highest points of European countries
  - List of highest points of North American countries
  - List of highest points of South American countries
- Geography of Oceania
- Lists of mountains by region § Oceania – a list of Oceania mountain lists
- Extreme points of Oceania
