= List of highest points of European countries =

List of topographical peaks

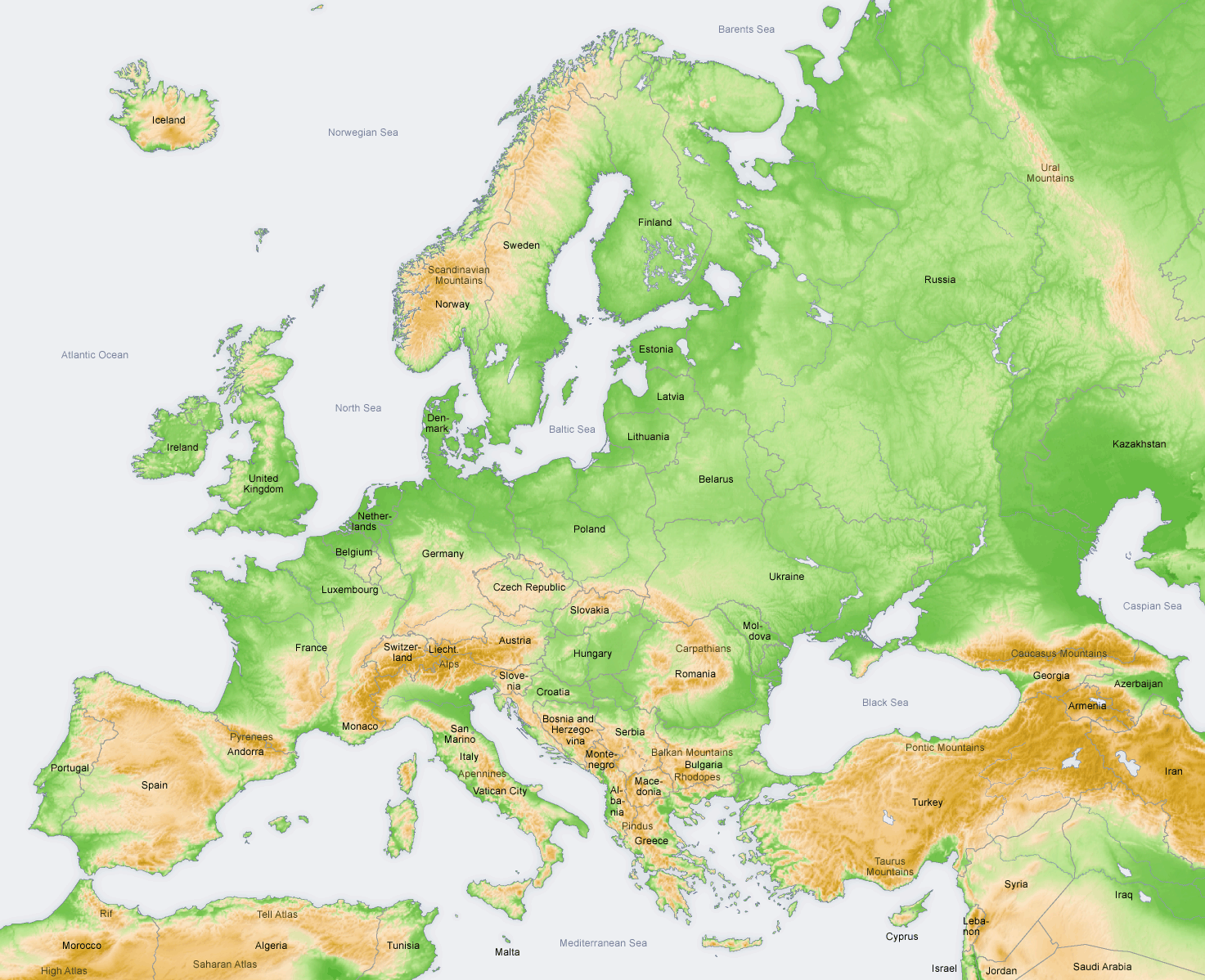
Topography of Europe

This article lists the highest natural elevation of each sovereign state on the continent of Europe defined physiographically.

Some couples such as Denmark (Greenland), Netherlands (Saba), Spain (Canary Islands) and Portugal (Azores Islands) have part of their territory and their high points outside of Europe; their non-European high points are mentioned in the Notes.

Not all points in this list are mountains or hills, some are simply elevations that are not distinguishable as geographical features.

== List ==
Rank	Country	Highest point	Elevation
1	Russia	Mount Elbrus	5,642 m (18,510 ft)
2	(Georgia (country)) Georgia	Shkhara	5,193 m (17,037 ft)
3	Turkey	Mount Ararat	5,137 m (16,854 ft)
4	Italy / France	Mont Blanc	4,808 m (15,774 ft)
5	Switzerland	Dufourspitze	4,634 m (15,203 ft)
6	Azerbaijan	Bazardüzü	4,466 m (14,652 ft)
7	Armenia	Mount Aragats	4,090 m (13,419 ft)
8	Austria	Grossglockner	3,798 m (12,461 ft)
9	Spain (Canary Islands)	Teide	3,718 m (12,198 ft)
10	Denmark (Greenland)	Gunnbjørn Fjeld	3,694 m (12,119 ft)
11	Spain	Mulhacén	3,482 m (11,424 ft)
12	Germany	Zugspitze	2,962 m (9,718 ft)
12	Andorra	Coma Pedrosa	2,942 m (9,652 ft)
13	Bulgaria	Musala	2,925 m (9,596 ft)
14	Greece	Mount Olympus	2,917 m (9,570 ft)
15	Slovenia	Triglav	2,864 m (9,396 ft)
16	Albania / North Macedonia	Mount Korab	2,764 m (9,068 ft)
17	Kosovo	Velika Rudoka	2,660 m (8,727 ft)
18	Slovakia	Gerlachovský štít	2,655 m (8,711 ft)
19	Liechtenstein	Vorder Grauspitz	2,599 m (8,527 ft)
20	Romania	Moldoveanu Peak	2,544 m (8,346 ft)
21	Montenegro	Zla Kolata	2,534 m (8,314 ft)
22	Poland	Rysy (NW summit)	2,499 m (8,199 ft)
23	Norway	Galdhøpiggen	2,469 m (8,100 ft)
24	Bosnia and Herzegovina	Maglić	2,386 m (7,828 ft)
25	Portugal (Azores)	Mount Pico	2,351 m (7,713 ft)
26	Serbia (Note: If Kosovo is not considered part of Serbia)	Midžor	2,169 m (7,116 ft)
27	Iceland	Hvannadalshnúkur	2,110 m (6,923 ft)
28	Sweden	Kebnekaise	2,097 m (6,880 ft)
29	Ukraine	Hoverla	2,061 m (6,762 ft)
30	Portugal	Serra da Estrela	1,993 m (6,539 ft)
31	Cyprus	Mount Olympus	1,952 m (6,404 ft)
32	Croatia	Dinara	1,831 m (6,007 ft)
33	(Czech Republic) Czechia	Sněžka	1,603 m (5,259 ft)
34	United Kingdom	Ben Nevis	1,345 m (4,413 ft)
35	Scotland	Ben Nevis (Beinn Nibheis)	1,345 m (4,413 ft)
36	Finland	Halti	1,324 m (4,344 ft)
37	Wales	Snowdon (Yr Wyddfa)	1,085 m (3,560 ft)
38	(Republic of Ireland) Ireland	Carrauntoohil	1,039 m (3,409 ft)
39	Turkey (European Turkey)	Mahya Dağı	1,031 m (3,383 ft)
40	Hungary	Kékes	1,014 m (3,327 ft)
41	England	Scafell Pike	978 m (3,209 ft)
42	Northern Ireland	Slieve Donard (Sliabh Dónairt)	852 m (2,795 ft)
43	San Marino	Monte Titano	749 m (2,457 ft)
44	Belgium	Signal de Botrange	694 m (2,277 ft)
45	Luxembourg	Kneiff	560 m (1,837 ft)
46	Moldova	Bălănești Hill	430 m (1,411 ft)
47	Belarus	Dzyarzhynskaya Hara	345 m (1,132 ft)
48	Netherlands	Vaalserberg	321 m (1,053 ft)
49	Estonia	Suur Munamägi	318 m (1,043 ft)
50	Latvia	Gaiziņkalns	312 m (1,024 ft)
51	Lithuania	Aukštojas Hill	294 m (965 ft)
52	Malta	Ta' Dmejrek	253 m (830 ft)
53	Denmark	Møllehøj	171 m (561 ft)
54	Monaco	Chemin des Révoires	163 m (535 ft)
55	Vatican City	Vatican Hill	75 m (246 ft)

== See also ==
- List of elevation extremes by country
  - List of highest points of African countries
  - List of highest points of Asian countries
  - List of highest points of North American countries
  - List of highest points of Oceanian countries
  - List of highest points of South American countries
- List of countries whose highest point is not on the mainland
- Geography of Europe
- Lists of mountains by region § Europe – a list of European mountain lists
- Extreme points of Europe
