= Mont Nabemba =

Mountain in Republic of Congo

- Location within Republic of the Congo

Highest point
- Elevation: 1,020 m (3,350 ft)
- Listing: Country high point
- Coordinates: 01°51′00″N 13°59′00″E

Geography
- Location: Republic of the Congo

Mont Nabemba is the highest mountain in the Republic of the Congo. Located in Sangha Department around fifty kilometres from the town of Souanké, the mountain has an elevation of 1,020 metres (3,346 ft).

Nabemba Tower in Brazzaville is named after the mountain.

== Mining ==
Iron ore deposits are located in the vicinity. Sundance Resources are drilling in preparation to mine the total mountain.
