= Morne de la Grande Montagne =

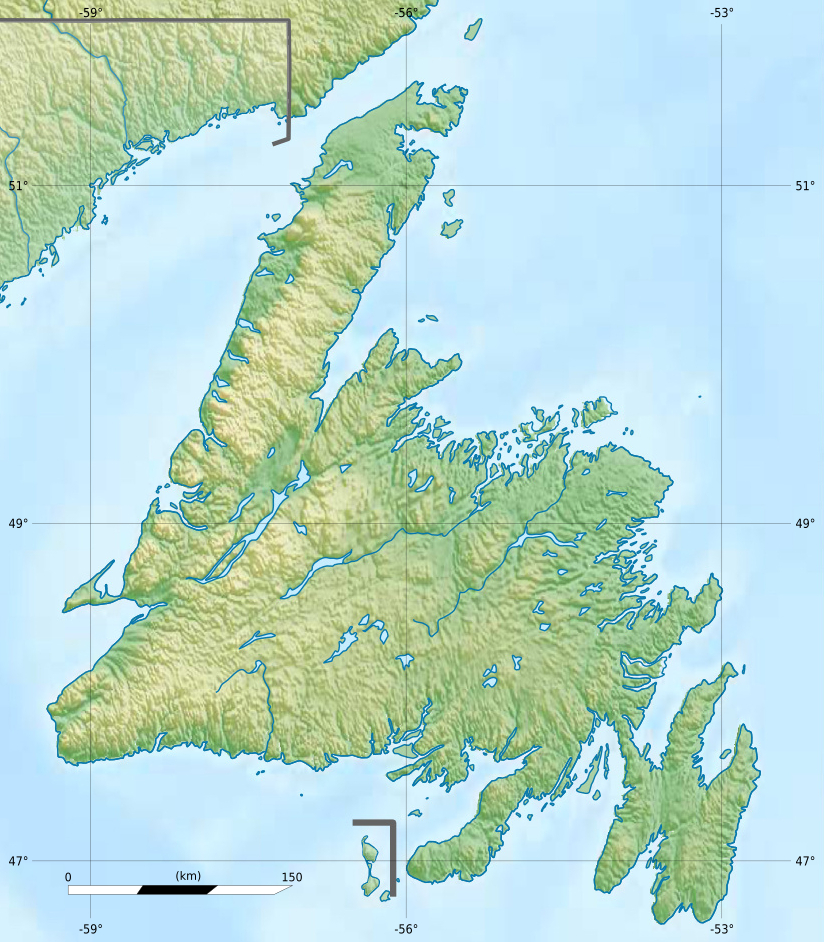
- Location within Newfoundland

Highest point
- Elevation: 240 m (790 ft)
- Prominence: 240 m (790 ft)
- Coordinates: 47°02′49″N 56°18′23″W

Geography
- Location: Saint Pierre and Miquelon

Morne de la Grande Montagne (French pronunciation: [mɔʁn də la ɡʁɑ̃d mɔ̃taɲ]) is the highest point of Saint Pierre and Miquelon, an overseas collectivity of France located in the Atlantic Ocean, with an elevation of 240 metres (787 ft). It is located near the center of Miquelon Island, which is also known as Grande Miquelon.

== See also ==
- Geography of Saint Pierre and Miquelon
