= Mount Hillaby =

Mountain in Barbados

- Location within Barbados

Highest point
- Elevation: 340 m (1,120 ft)
- Prominence: 340 m (1,120 ft)
- Listing: Country high point
- Coordinates: 13°12′38″N 59°34′54″W

Geography
- Location: Barbados, Caribbean

The peak of Mount Hillaby is the highest point on the Eastern Caribbean island of Barbados. The peak is located in the parish of Saint Andrew. It immediately overlooks the area known as the Scotland District to the north and east which comprises geologically old sediments prone to erosion.
