= Sabkhat Matti =

Dry lake between Saudi Arabia and the United Arab Emirates

Coordinates: 23°50′36″N 52°01′50″E

Sabkhat Matti is a dry lake on the border between Saudi Arabia and the United Arab Emirates. "Sabkha" means "salt flat" in Arabic. In the 1930s, Bedouins told western surveyors that the salt flats were named after someone named "Matti", who had disappeared while trying to cross them. At 17 metres (56 ft) below sea level, it is the lowest point in Saudi Arabia and the United Arab Emirates.
