= Jabal Firwā' =

Mountain in Saudi Arabia

Jabal Firwā‘
- Location within Saudi Arabia

Highest point
- Elevation: 3,004 m (9,856 ft)
- Coordinates: 17°55′43″N 43°15′56″E

Geography
- Location: Saudi Arabia
- Parent range: Ḥijāz Mountains

Jabal Firwā‘ is a mountain in Saudi Arabia, with an elevation of 3,004 metres (9,856 feet). It is located in ‘Asīr.

A 2018 survey measured an elevation of 3,002 metres (9,849 ft), which would make it the tallest mountain in Saudi Arabia, slightly taller than Jabal as-Sūda, measured to be 2,999 metres (9,839 ft).
