= List of islands by highest point =

On this chart of Earth's 100 most prominent peaks, each peak shaded black is the highest point on its island (labeled under the peaks) as is the leftmost peak of each colored group (with its base at 0 m). In the SVG version, hover over a peak to highlight its parent(s) and click it to view its article.

This is a list of islands in the world ordered by their highest point; it lists islands with peaks by elevation. At the end of this article continental landmasses are also included for comparison.

Island countries and territories listed are those containing the highest point.

== List of islands with highest point by elevation ==
Rank	Island	Highest point	Height	Area (km^{2})	Country or region	Other countries or territories on island
1	New Guinea	Puncak Jaya	4884 m 16,024 ft	785,753	Central Papua Indonesia	Papua New Guinea
2	Hawaiʻi	Mauna Kea	4207 m 13,802 ft	10,430	Hawaiʻi United States	
3	Borneo	Mount Kinabalu	4095 m 13,435 ft	748,168	Sabah Malaysia	Indonesia; Brunei
4	Taiwan	Yu Shan	3952 m 12,966 ft	35,980	Nantou County Taiwan	
5	Sumatra	Mount Kerinci	3805 m 12,484 ft	473,481	Indonesia	
6	Ross Island	Mount Erebus	3794 m 12,448 ft	2,460	Antarctica	
7	Honshū	Mount Fuji	3776 m 12,388 ft	227,960	Japan	
8	Lombok	Mount Rinjani	3726 m 12,224 ft	4,738	Indonesia	
9	South Island	Aoraki/Mount Cook	3724 m 12,218 ft	150,437	New Zealand	
10	Tenerife	Teide	3715 m 12,188 ft	2,034	Canary Islands Spain	
11	Greenland	Gunnbjørn Fjeld	3694 m 12,119 ft	2,166,086	Greenland	
12	Java	Semeru	3676 m 12,060 ft	129,904	Indonesia	
13	Sulawesi	Mount Latimojong	3478 m 11,411 ft	180,680	Indonesia	
14	Sicily	Mount Etna	3403 m 11,165 ft	25,711	Italy	
15	Siple Island	Mount Siple	3110 m 10,200 ft	6,390	Antarctica	
16	Hispaniola	Pico Duarte	3098 m 10,164 ft	76,192	Dominican Republic	Haiti
17	Réunion	Piton des Neiges	3070 m 10,070 ft	2,511	France	
18	Maui	Haleakala	3055 m 10,023 ft	1,883	Hawaiʻi United States	
19	Bali	Mount Agung	3031 m 9944 ft	5,780	Indonesia	
20	Seram	Mount Binaiya	3027 m 9931 ft	17,100	Indonesia	
21	Bioko	Pico Basilé	3011 m 9879 ft	2,017	Equatorial Guinea	
22	Alexander Island	Mount Stephenson	2987 m 9800 ft	49,070	Antarctica	
23	Timor	Tatamailau	2986 m 9797 ft	30,777	Timor-Leste	Indonesia
24	Mindanao	Mount Apo	2954 m 9692 ft	97,530	Philippines	
25	South Georgia	Mount Paget	2935 m 9629 ft	3,528	South Georgia and the South Sandwich Islands, overseas territory of the United Kingdom	
26	Luzon	Mount Pulag	2928 m 9606 ft	109,965	Philippines	
27	Madagascar	Maromokotro	2876 m 9436 ft	587,041	Madagascar	
28	Unimak Island	Mount Shishaldin	2869 m 9413 ft	4,069	Alaska United States	
29	Fogo	Mount Fogo	2829 m 9281 ft	476	Cape Verde	
30	North Island	Mount Ruapehu	2797 m 9177 ft	113,729	New Zealand	
31	Anvers Island	Mount Français	2760 m 9060 ft	2,432	Antarctica	
32	Heard Island	Mawson Peak	2745 m 9006 ft	368	Australia	
33	Sumbawa	Mount Tambora	2722 m 8930 ft	15,414	Indonesia	
34	Bougainville	Mount Balbi	2715 m 8907 ft	9,318	Papua New Guinea	
35	Corsica	Monte Cinto	2706 m 8878 ft	8,722	France	
36	Buru	Mount Kapalatmada	2700 m 8900 ft	12,655	Indonesia	
37	Ellesmere Island	Barbeau Peak	2616 m 8583 ft	196,235	Nunavut Canada	
38	Mindoro	Mount Halcon	2616 m 8583 ft	10,571	Philippines	
39	Tierra del Fuego	Monte Shipton	2580 m 8460 ft	48,100	Chile	Argentina
40	Goodenough Island	Mount Vineuo	2536 m 8320 ft	687	Papua New Guinea	
41	Sri Lanka	Pidurutalagala	2524 m 8281 ft	65,268	Sri Lanka	
42	Brabant Island	Mount Parry	2520 m 8270 ft	1,770	Antarctica	
43	Negros	Mount Kanlaon	2465 m 8087 ft	13,309	Philippines	
44	Crete	Mount Ida	2456 m 8058 ft	8,450	Greece	
45	La Palma	Roque de los Muchachos	2423 m 7949 ft	708	Canary Islands Spain	
46	Flores	Poco Mandasawu	2370 m 7780 ft	13,540	Indonesia	
47	Grande Comore	Mount Karthala	2361 m 7746 ft	1,025	Comoros	
48	Pico Island	Mount Pico	2351 m 7713 ft	444	Azores Portugal	
49	New Ireland	Mount Taron	2340 m 7680 ft	7,404	Papua New Guinea	
50	Atlasov Island	Alaid Volcano	2339 m 7674 ft	119	(Kuril Islands) Russia	
51	Guadalcanal	Mount Popomanaseu	2335 m 7661 ft	5,302	Solomon Islands	
52	New Britain	Mount Ulawun	2334 m 7657 ft	36,520	Papua New Guinea	
53	Adelaide Island	Mount Gaudry	2315 m 7595 ft	4,663	Antarctica	
54	Hokkaidō	Mount Asahi	2290 m 7510 ft	83,423	Japan	
55	Jan Mayen	Beerenberg	2277 m 7470 ft	377	Norway	
56	Jamaica	Blue Mountain Peak	2256 m 7402 ft	10,911	Jamaica	
57	Tahiti	Mount Orohena	2241 m 7352 ft	1,044	French Polynesia, dependent territory of France	
58	Axel Heiberg Island	Outlook Peak	2210 m 7250 ft	43,178	Nunavut Canada	
59	Vancouver Island	Golden Hinde	2195 m 7201 ft	31,285	British Columbia Canada	
60	Umnak	Mount Vsevidof	2149 m 7051 ft	1,776	Alaska United States	
61	Baffin Island	Mount Odin	2147 m 7044 ft	507,451	Nunavut Canada	
62	Panay	Mount Madja-as	2117 m 6946 ft	12,011	Philippines	
63	Bacan	Buku Sibela	2111 m 6926 ft	16,374	Indonesia	
64	Iceland	Hvannadalshnúkur	2110 m 6920 ft	103,001	Iceland	
65	Milne Land	St. Thomas Lund Peak	2110 m 6920 ft	3,913	Greenland	
66	Upernivik Island	Palup Qaqa	2105 m 6906 ft	503	Greenland	
67	Smith Island	Mount Foster	2105 m 6906 ft	148	Antarctica	
68	Palawan	Mount Mantalingajan	2086 m 6844 ft	12,188	Philippines	
69	Fergusson Island	Othona Peak	2073 m 6801 ft	1,437	Papua New Guinea	
70	Tristan da Cunha	Queen Mary's Peak	2062 m 6765 ft	98	Tristan da Cunha, part of Saint Helena, Ascension and Tristan da Cunha, an overseas territory of the United Kingdom	
71	Sibuyan Island	Mount Guiting-Guiting	2058 m 6752 ft	445	Philippines	
72	Unalaska Island	Mount Makushin	2036 m 6680 ft	2,720	Alaska United States	
73	São Tomé	Pico de São Tomé	2024 m 6640 ft	859	São Tomé and Príncipe	
74	Coulman Island	Mount Hawkes	2000 m 6600 ft	319	Antarctica claimed by New Zealand	
75	Shikoku	Mount Ishizuchi	1982 m 6503 ft	18,801	Japan	
76	Santo Antão	Tope de Coroa	1979 m 6493 ft	785	Cape Verde	
77	Cuba (main island)	Pico Turquino	1974 m 6476 ft	109,884	Cuba	
78	Gran Canaria	Morro de la Agujereada	1956 m 6417 ft	1,560	Canary Islands Spain	
79	Cyprus	Mount Olympus	1952 m 6404 ft	9,251	Cyprus	
80	Clarence Island	Mount Irving	1950 m 6400 ft	114.6	Antarctica	
81	Sangeang Api	Sangeang Api	1949 m 6394 ft	153	Indonesia	
82	Jeju Island	Hallasan	1947 m 6388 ft	1,833	Republic of Korea	
83	Yakushima	Mount Miyanoura	1936 m 6352 ft	504	Japan	
84	Disko Island	Pyramiden	1919 m 6296 ft	8,578	Greenland	
85	Espiritu Santo	Mount Tabwemasana	1879 m 6165 ft	3,955	Vanuatu	
86	Madeira	Pico Ruivo	1861 m 6106 ft	801	Madeira, autonomous region of Portugal	
87	Savai'i	Mount Silisili	1858 m 6096 ft	1,694	Samoa	
88	Kerguelen Island	Mont Ross	1850 m 6070 ft	6,675	French Southern and Antarctic Lands, overseas territory of France	
89	Hainan	Wuzhi Shan	1840 m 6040 ft	35,354	China	
90	Sardinia	Punta la Marmora	1834 m 6017 ft	24,090	Italy	
91	Riesco Island	Mount Atalaya	1830 m 6000 ft	5,110	Chile	
92	Kyushu	Mount Kuju	1791 m 5876 ft	36,782	Japan	
93	Kolombangara	Mount Veve	1768 m 5801 ft	687.8	Solomon Islands	
94	Euboea	Dirfi	1743 m 5719 ft	3,684	Greece	
95	Tidore	Kie Matubu	1730 m 5680 ft	150.12	Indonesia	
96	Rishiri Island	Mount Rishiri	1721 m 5646 ft	182.1	Japan	
97	Ternate Island	Gamalama	1715 m 5627 ft	111.80	Indonesia	
98	Spitsbergen	Newtontoppen	1713 m 5620 ft	37,673	(Svalbard) Norway	
99	Isabela Island	Volcán Wolf	1707 m 5600 ft	4,640	(Galápagos) Ecuador	
100	Sturge Island	Brown Peak	1705 m 5594 ft	437	Antarctica but claimed by Norway	
101	Livingston Island	Mount Friesland	1700 m 5600 ft	798	Antarctica	
102	Magdalena Island	Mentolat	1660 m 5450 ft	2,025	Chile	
103	Peter I Island	Lars Christensen Peak	1640 m 5380 ft	154	Antarctica but claimed by Norway	
104	Grande Terre	Mont Panié	1628 m 5341 ft	16,372	New Caledonia, overseas territory of France	
105	Cephalonia	Mount Ainos	1628 m 5341 ft	786	Greece	
106	Tasmania	Mount Ossa	1617 m 5305 ft	90,758	Tasmania Australia	
107	Samothrace	Mount Fengari	1611 m 5285 ft	178	Greece	
108	Sakhalin	Mount Lopatin	1609 m 5279 ft	72,492	Russia	
109	Kauai	Kawaikini	1598 m 5243 ft	1,456	Hawaiʻi United States	
110	Anjouan	Mount Ntringui	1595 m 5233 ft	424	Comoros	
111	Halmahera	Mount Gamkonora	1560 m 5120 ft	17,780	Indonesia	
112	Camiguin	Mount Mambajao	1552 m 5092 ft	237	Philippines	
113	Severny Island	Mount Kruzenshtern	1547 m 5075 ft	48,904	Russia	
114	Molokai	Kamakou	1512 m 4961 ft	670	Hawaiʻi United States	
115	Socotra	Hajhir	1503 m 4931 ft	3,796	Yemen	
116	El Hierro	Pico de Malpaso	1501 m 4925 ft	268	Canary Islands Spain	
117	La Gomera	Garajonay	1487 m 4879 ft	370.03	Canary Islands Spain	
118	Fernandina Island	Volcán La Cumbre	1476 m 4843 ft	642	(Galápagos) Ecuador	
119	Basse-Terre Island	La Grande Soufrière	1467 m 4813 ft	1,628	Guadeloupe (France)	
120	Dominica	Morne Diablotins	1447 m 4747 ft	750	Dominica	
121	Mallorca	Puig Major	1436 m 4711 ft	3,640.11	Balearic Islands Spain	
122	Samos	Kerkis	1434 m 4705 ft	477.4	Greece	
123	Martinique	Mont Pelée	1397 m 4583 ft	1,128	Martinique (France)	
124	Santiago	Pico de Antonia	1392 m 4567 ft	991	Cape Verde	
125	São Sebastião	Pico de São Sebastião	1378 m 4521 ft	347.52	Brazil	
126	Kodiak Island	Koniag Peak	1362 m 4469 ft	9,311.2	Alaska United States	
127	Biliran	Mount Maliwatan	1346 m 4416 ft	536.01	Philippines	
128	Great Britain	Ben Nevis	1345 m 4413 ft	209,331	Scotland United Kingdom	
129	Puerto Rico	Cerro de Punta	1338 m 4390 ft	9,104	Puerto Rico (United States)	
130	Ambrym	Ambrym Volcano	1334 m 4377 ft	677.7	Vanuatu	
*	Leyte	Alto Peak	1332 m 4370 ft	7367.6	Philippines	
*	Viti Levu	Mount Tomanivi	1324 m 4344 ft	10,388	Fiji	
*	São Nicolau	Monte Gordo	1312 m 4304 ft	343	Cape Verde	
*	Isla Ángel de la Guarda	Unnamed peak	1305 m 4281 ft	931	Baja California Mexico	
*	Malaita	Mount Kalourat	1303 m 4275 ft	4307	Solomon Islands	
*	Chios	Mount Pelineon	1297 m 4255 ft	842.3	Greece	
*	Yuzhny Island	Mount Pervosvotrennaya	1291 m 4236 ft	33,275	Russia	
*	Andorja	Langlitinden	1276 m 4186 ft	135	Norway	
*	Alejandro Selkirk Island	Cerro de Los Inocentes	1268 m 4160 ft	49.5	Juan Fernández Islands, territory of Chile	
*	Makira	Unnamed point	1250 m 4100 ft	3,190	Solomon Islands	
*	Saint Vincent	La Soufrière	1234 m 4049 ft	345	Saint Vincent and the Grenadines	
*	Marion Island	Mascarin Peak	1230 m 4040 ft	335	Prince Edward Islands, territory of South Africa	
*	Oahu	Ka'ala	1227 m 4026 ft	1,545	Hawaiʻi United States	
*	Sumba	Mount Wanggameti	1225 m 4019 ft	11,005.62	Indonesia	
*	Rhodes	Mount Attavyros	1215 m 3986 ft	1,400.68	Greece	
*	Karpathos	Mount Lastos	1215 m 3986 ft	324.8	Greece	
*	Mo'orea	Mount Tohivea	1207 m 3960 ft	134	French Polynesia (France)	
*	Thasos	Mount Ypsario	1205 m 3953 ft	380.097	Greece	
*	Secretary Island	Mount Grono	1196 m 3924 ft	81.4	New Zealand	
*	Navarino Island	Dientes de Navarino	1195 m 3921 ft	2,473	Chile	
*	Uummannaq Island	Uummannaq	1170 m 3840 ft	12	Greenland	
*	Lingga	Mount Daik	1165 m 3822 ft	889	Indonesia	
*	Marinduque	Mount Malindig	1157 m 3796 ft	952.58	Philippines	
*	Saint Kitts	Mount Liamuiga	1156 m 3793 ft	174	Saint Kitts and Nevis	
*	Santa Isabel	Mount Sasari	1120 m 3670 ft	2,999	Solomon Islands	
*	Upolu	Mount Fito	1113 m 3652 ft	1,125	Samoa	
*	Choiseul	Mount Maetambe	1067 m 3501 ft	2,971	Solomon Islands	
*	São Miguel Island	Pico da Vara	1105 m 3625 ft	744	Azores Portugal	
*	Vangunu	Mount Vangunu	1082 m 3550 ft	509	Solomon Islands	
*	São Jorge Island	Pico da Esperança	1053.4 m 3456 ft	244	Azores Portugal	
*	Rendova	Rendova Peak	1050 m 3440 ft	411	Solomon Islands	
*	Île de l'Est	Mont Marion-Dufresne	1050 m 3440 ft	130	French Southern and Antarctic Lands, overseas territory of France	
*	Faial Island	Cabeço Gordo	1043 m 3422 ft	173.06	Azores Portugal	
*	Ireland	Carrauntoohil	1038.6 m 3407 ft	84,421	Republic of Ireland	Northern Ireland, constituent country of the United Kingdom
*	Vanua Levu	Mount Nasorolevu	1032 m 3386 ft	5,587.1	Fiji	
*	Kao Island	Kao Volcano	1030 m 3380 ft	11.55	Tonga	
*	Lanai	Lana'ihale	1026 m 3366 ft	364	Hawaiʻi United States	
*	Terceira Island	Serra de Santa Bárbara	1021.2 m 3350 ft	400	Azores Portugal	
*	Raiatea	Mount Tefatua	1017 m 3337 ft	167.7	French Polynesia (France)	
*	Cebu	Osmena Peak	1015 m 3330 ft	4,467.5	Philippines	
*	Batan Island	Mount Iraya	1009 m 3310 ft	95.18	Philippines	
*	Nevis	Nevis Peak	985 m 3232 ft	93	Saint Kitts and Nevis	
*	Brava	Monte Fontainhas	976 m 3202 ft	62.5	Cape Verde	
*	Basilan	Basilan Peak	971 m 3186 ft	1,327.23	Philippines	
*	Agrihan	Mount Agrihan	965 m 3166 ft	44.05	Northern Mariana Islands (United States)	
*	Saint Lucia	Mount Gimie	950 m 3120 ft	617	Saint Lucia	
*	Principe	Pico de Principe	947 m 3107 ft	136	São Tomé and Príncipe	
*	Trinidad	El Cerro del Aripo	940 m 3080 ft	4768	Trinidad and Tobago	
*	Dinagat	Mount Redondo	939 m 3081 ft	1,036.34	Philippines	
*	Lantau Island	Lantau Peak	934 m 3064 ft	147	Hong Kong	
*	Île de la Possession	Pic du Mascarin	934 m 3064 ft	150	French Southern and Antarctic Lands, overseas territory of France	
*	Banie	Mt. Banie	924 m 3031 ft	173	Solomon Islands	
*	Maripipi Island	Mount Maripipi	924 m 3031 ft	27.83	Philippines	
*	Flores Island	Morro Alto	915 m 3002 ft	141.02	Azores Portugal	
*	Santiago Island	Cerro Pelado	906 m 2972 ft	585	(Galápagos) Ecuador	
*	Mahe	Morne Seychellois	905 m 2969 ft	157.3	Seychelles	
*	Attu Island	Attu Peak	897.9 m 2946 ft	893	Alaska United States	
*	Samar	Mount Huraw	890 m 2920 ft	13,428.8	Philippines	
*	Nggatokae	Mount Mariu	887 m 2910 ft	93	Solomon Islands	
*	Saba	Mount Scenery	870 m 2850 ft	12	Saba (Netherlands)	
*	Île Amsterdam	Mont de la Dives	881 m 2890 ft	56.6	French Southern and Antarctic Lands, overseas territory of France	
*	Eysturoy	Slættaratindur	880 m 2890 ft	286.3	Faroe Islands (Denmark)	
*	Malakula	Mount Liambele	879 m 2884 ft	2041	Vanuatu	
*	Ranongga	Mount Kela	869 m 2851 ft	28	Solomon Islands	
*	Bohol	Mount Matunog	864 m 2835 ft	4,820.95	Philippines	
*	Santa Cruz Island	Cerro Crocker	864 m 2835 ft	986	(Galápagos) Ecuador	
*	Balut Island	Mount Balut	862 m 2828 ft	54.62	Philippines	
*	New Georgia	Mount Masse	860 m 2820 ft	2,037	Solomon Islands	
*	Île aux Cochons	Mont Richard-Foy	853 m 2799 ft	67	French Southern and Antarctic Lands, overseas territory of France	
*	Tinakula	Tinakula	851 m 2792 ft	7.8	Solomon Islands	
*	Babuyan Island	Babuyan Claro	843 m 2766 ft	100	Philippines	
*	Viðoy	Villingadalsfjall	841 m 2759 ft	41	Faroe Islands (Denmark)	
*	Grenada	Mount Saint Catherine	840 m 2760 ft	344	Grenada	
*	Penang Island	Western Hill	833 m 2733 ft	295	Malaysia (Malaysia)	
*	Kunoy	Kúvingafjall	830 m 2720 ft	35.5	Faroe Islands (Denmark)	
*	Mauritius	Piton de la Petite Rivière Noire	828 m 2717 ft	2,040	Mauritius	
*	Isla de los Estados	Unnamed peak	823 m 2700 ft	534	Argentina	
*	Newfoundland	The Cabox	812 m 2664 ft	9,656	Newfoundland and Labrador Canada	
*	Fuerteventura	Pico de la Zarza	807 m 2648 ft	1,659.74	Canary Islands Spain	
*	Jolo Island	Mount Tumatangis	803 m 2635 ft	869	Philippines	
*	Nias	Lolomatua	800 m 2600 ft	5,345.056	Indonesia	
*	Mohéli	Mount Mohéli	790 m 2590 ft	211	Comoros	
*	Anatahan	Mount Anatahan	790 m 2590 ft	33.91	Northern Mariana Islands	
*	Vella Lavella	Mount Tambisala	790 m 2590 ft	628	Solomon Islands	
*	Streymoy	Kopsenni	789 m 2589 ft	373	Faroe Islands (Denmark)	
*	Kalsoy	Nestindar	788 m 2585 ft	30.9	Faroe Islands (Denmark)	
*	Pohnpei	Mount Nanlaud	782 m 2566 ft	334	Federated States of Micronesia	
*	Brač	Vidova Gora	780 m 2560 ft	396	Croatia	
*	Nordaustlandet, Svalbard	Snotoppen	764 m 2507 ft	14,443	Norway	
*	São Vicente	Monte Verde	744 m 2441 ft	226.7	Cape Verde	
*	Santa Cruz Island	Devils Peak	740 m 2430 ft	250	California United States	
*	Orcas Island	Mount Constitution	731 m 2398 ft	148	Washington United States	
*	North Andaman Island	Saddle Peak	731 m 2398 ft	2,780.7	India	
*	Banks Island	Durham Heights	730 m 2400 ft	70,028	Northwest Territories Canada	
*	Corvo Island	Estreitinho	720 m 2360 ft	17.12	Azores Portugal	
*	San Cristóbal Island	Cerro San Joaquín	713 m 2339 ft	558	(Galápagos) Ecuador	
*	Camiguin Island	Camiguin de Babuyanes	712 m 2336 ft	600	Philippines	
*	Adams Island	Mount Dick	705 m 2313 ft	100	New Zealand	
*	Panaon Island	Mount Nelangcapan	698 m 2290 ft	191	Philippines	
*	Catanduanes	Mount Tamboo	695 m 2280 ft	1,492.16	Philippines	
*	Masbate	Conical Peak	684 m 2244 ft	3,268	Philippines	
*	Lanzarote	Peñas del Chache	671 m 2201 ft	374	Canary Islands Spain	
*	Bangka Island	Gunung Bui	665 m 2182 ft	11,693.54	Indonesia	
*	Tablas Island	Tablas Peak	665 m 2182 ft	839.156	Philippines	
*	Mayotte	Mount Benara	660 m 2170 ft	374	Mayotte (France)	
*	Auckland Island	Cavern Peak	659 m 2162 ft	442.5	New Zealand	
*	Victoria Island	Unnamed peak	655 m 2149 ft	217.291	Northwest Territories Canada	
*	Rarotonga	Te Manga	652 m 2139 ft	67.39	Cook Islands	
*	Efate	Mount McDonald	647 m 2123 ft	899.5	Vanuatu	
*	Great Nicobar Island	Mount Thullier	642 m 2106 ft	921	India	
*	Floreana Island, Galápagos	Cerro Pajas	640 m 2100 ft	173	Ecuador	
*	Santa Catalina Island (California)	Mount Orizaba	639 m 2097 ft	194.2	California United States	
*	Siquijor	Mount Malabahoc	628 m 2060 ft	337.49	Philippines	
*	Busuanga Island	Mount Tundalara	620 m 2030 ft	890	Philippines	
*	Lubang Island	Mount Ambonong	610 m 2000 ft	125	Philippines	
*	Banton Island	Mount Banton	607 m 1991 ft	32.48	Philippines	
*	Annobón Island	Quioveo	598 m 1962 ft	17	Equatorial Guinea	
*	Edgeøya	Kvitisen-Storskavlen	590 m 1940 ft	7,175	Svalbard, Norway	
*	Taha'a	Mount Ohiri	590 m 1940 ft	90.2	French Polynesia (France)	
*	Santa Maria Island	Pico Alto	586.8 m 1925 ft	96.87	Azores Portugal	
*	Fauro Island	Mount Pauboleala	574 m 1883 ft	195	Solomon Islands	
*	Pan de Azucar	Mount Pan de Azucar	574 m 1883 ft	18.4	Philippines	
*	Krk	Obzova	568 m 1864 ft	405.8	Croatia	
*	Campbell Island	Mount Honey	558 m 1831 ft	112.68	New Zealand	
*	Hong Kong Island	Victoria Peak	552 m 1811 ft	16,390	Hong Kong	
*	Tawi-Tawi	Mount Sibangkat	552 m 1811 ft	580.5	Philippines	
*	Nendö Island	Unnamed point	549 m 1801 ft	505	Solomon Islands	
*	Diogo Island	Mount Diogo	547 m 1795 ft	2.15	Philippines	
*	Balabac Island	Balabac Peak	546 m 1791 ft	349.27	Philippines	
*	Cape Breton Island	White Hill	535 m 1755 ft	10,311	Nova Scotia Canada	
*	Samal Island	Puting-Bato Peak	535 m 1755 ft	301.3	Philippines	
*	Futuna	Mont Puke	524 m 1719 ft	80	Wallis and Futuna (France)	
*	Pavuvu	Unnamed point	520 m 1710 ft	129	Solomon Islands	
*	Middle Andaman Island	Mount Diavolo	512 m 1680 ft	1,523	India	
*	Easter Island	Terevaka	507 m 1663 ft	163.6	Chile	
*	Belitung Island	Mount Tajam	500 m 1600 ft	4,800.6	Indonesia	
*	Okinawa Island	Mount Yonaha	503 m 1650 ft	1,199	Japan	
*	Savo Island	Mount Savo	485 m 1591 ft	31	Solomon Islands	
*	Ibiza	Sa Talaiassa	475 m 1558 ft	571.6	Balearic Islands Spain	
*	Saipan	Mount Tapochau	474 m 1555 ft	118.98	Northern Mariana Islands (United States)	
*	Culion Island	Mount Oltaloro	468 m 1535 ft	499.59	Philippines	
*	Madura Island	Gunung Pajudan	463.9 m 1522 ft	5,408.45	Indonesia	
*	South Andaman Island	Mount Koyob	459 m 1506 ft	1,262	India	
*	Maio	Monte Penoso	436 m 1430 ft	274.5	Cape Verde	
*	Saint Martin	Pic Paradis	424 m 1391 ft	88	Saint Martin (France)	Sint Maarten (Netherlands)
*	South Malaita Island	Apoloto Ridge	417 m 1368 ft	480	Solomon Islands	
*	Guam	Mount Lamlam	406 m 1332 ft	540	Guam (United States)	
*	Sal	Monte Grande	406 m 1332 ft	219.84	Cape Verde	
*	Antigua	Boggy Peak	402 m 1319 ft	281	Antigua and Barbuda	
*	Santa Luzia	Topona	395 m 1296 ft	34.2	Cape Verde	
*	Boa Vista	Monte Estância	387 m 1270 ft	631.1	Cape Verde	
*	Graciosa	Pico do Facho	375 m 1230 ft	60.65	Azores Portugal	
*	Homonhon Island	Homonhon Peak	374 m 1227 ft	105.2	Philippines	
*	Curaçao	Christoffelberg	372 m 1220 ft	444	Curaçao kingdom of Netherlands	
*	Menorca	El Toro	358 m 1175 ft	695.8	Balearic Islands Spain	
*	Sabtang Island	Mount Tungaru	352 m 1155 ft	40.7	Philippines	
*	Alabat Island	Alabat Peak	346.9 m 1138 ft	192	Philippines	
*	Maestre de Campo Island	Mount Maestre de Campo	346 m 1135 ft	19.82	Philippines	
*	Barbados	Mount Hillaby	340.01 m 1115.5 ft	439	Barbados	
*	Sicogon	Mount Sicogon	340.01 m 1115.5 ft	11.6	Philippines	
*	Burias Island	Mount Enganoso	331.9 m 1089 ft	435.1	Philippines	
*	Polillo Island	Mount Malolo	324 m 1063 ft	628.9	Philippines	
*	Isla de la Juventud	Unnamed point	303 m 994 ft	2,419	Cuba	
*	Chatham Island	Unnamed point	299 m 981 ft	920	New Zealand	
*	Itbayat	Mount Santa Rosa	280 m 920 ft	83.13	Philippines	
*	Guimaras	Mount Bontoc	272 m 892 ft	604.57	Philippines	
*	La Graciosa	Agujas Grandes	266 m 873 ft	29.05	Canary Islands Spain	
*	Cuyo Island	Mount Bonbon	251 m 823 ft	130	Philippines	
*	Babeldaob	Mount Ngerchelchuus	242 m 794 ft	331	Palau	
*	Pitt Island	Waihere Head	241 m 791 ft	65	New Zealand	
*	Corcuera Island	Mount Simara	230 m 750 ft	28.53	Philippines	
*	Ticao Island	Mount Pandan	228.9 m 751 ft	334	Philippines	
*	Unguja	Koani Mountain	195 m 640 ft	1,666	Tanzania	
*	Aruba	Mount Jamanota	188 m 617 ft	180	Aruba (Netherlands)	
*	Iwo Jima	Mount Suribachi	169 m 554 ft	29.86	Japan	
*	Dumaran Island	Dumaran Peak	165 m 541 ft	322	Philippines	
*	Singapore Island	Bukit Timah	163.63 m 536.8 ft	730	Singapore	
*	Siargao Island	Mount Baliuko	157.9 m 518 ft	437	Philippines	
*	Prince Edward Island	Springton Peak	152 m 499 ft	5,660	Prince Edward Island Canada	
*	Bahrain	Mountain of Smoke	134 m 440 ft	604	Bahrain	
*	Grande-Terre	Morne I'Escade	129 m 423 ft	586.68	Guadeloupe (France)	
*	Long Island	Jayne's Hill	122.2 m 401 ft	3,564	New York United States	
*	Formentera	La Mola	119 m 390 ft	83.24	Balearic Islands Spain	
*	Pemba Island	Masingini Ridge	119 m 390 ft	988	Tanzania	
*	Boracay Island	Mount Luho	100 m 330 ft	10.32	Philippines	
*	Mararison	Tuyong-tuyong Hill	82.9 m 272 ft	0.55	Philippines	
*	Banaba	Unnamed point	81 m 266 ft	6.29	Kiribati highest point in Kiribati	
*	Nauru	Command Ridge	65 m 213 ft	21	Nauru highest point in Nauru	
*	Mafia Island	Unnamed point	53 m 174 ft	435	Tanzania	
*	Barbuda	Unnamed point	44.5 m 146 ft	160.56	Antigua and Barbuda	
*	Tongatapu	Mata ki 'Eua	28 m 92 ft	260.48	Tonga	
*	Likiep Atoll	Unnamed point	10 m 33 ft	10.26	Marshall Islands highest point in Marshall Islands	
*	Addu Atoll	Unnamed point	5.1 m 17 ft	0.27	Maldives highest point in Maldives	
*	Niulakita	Unnamed point	4.6 m 15 ft	0.42	Tuvalu highest point in Tuvalu	

== Other notable island peaks ==
Many of the following islands are selected for inclusion as the main island or having the highest peak in their island nation. The list includes some dependent or semi-dependent island overseas territories with their own ISO 3166-1 country code. The dependencies of Guernsey (Alderney, Sark, Herm) and St. Helena (Tristan da Cunha, Ascension Island) are listed as separate units.

Nevis (Saint Kitts-Nevis) is also listed separately. The islands of the former Netherlands Antilles (Aruba, Curaçao, Bonaire, Saint Martin, Sint Eustatius, Saba) have been split up in separate units.

The list also includes other notable islands, for example some islands that are the highest island mountain of its country or autonomous region.

Island	Highest point	Height	area (km²)	Country or
Lefkada	Mount Stavrota	1158 m 3799 ft	333.6	Greece
Wrangel Island	Gora Sovetskaya	1096 m 3596 ft	7,600	Russia
Icaria	Mount Aetheras (Pramnos)	1041 m 3415 ft	255.3	Greece
Kao	Kao	1033 m 3389 ft	11.6	Tonga
Ilha Grande	Pico da Pedra D'Água	1031 m 3383 ft	193	Brazil
Elba	Monte Capanne	1018 m 3340 ft	224	Italy, Tuscan Archipelago
Naxos	Mount Zeus	1001 m 3284 ft	430	Greece
Andros	Mount Petalo	994 m 3261 ft	380	Greece
Skye	Sgùrr Alasdair	992 m 3255 ft	1,656	United Kingdom (Scotland)
Stewart Island / Rakiura	Mount Anglem	979 m 3212 ft	1,747.42	New Zealand
Nevis	Nevis Peak	985 m 3232 ft	93	Nevis, autonomous island of Saint Kitts and Nevis
Salina	Monte Fossa delle Felci	968 m 3176 ft	26.38	Italy, Aeolian Islands
Mull	Ben More	966 m 3169 ft	875.35	United Kingdom (Scotland)
Agrihan	unnamed location	965 m 3166 ft	44.05	Northern Mariana Islands, commonwealth in political union with the United States
Ta'u	Lata Mountain	964 m 3163 ft	44.31	American Samoa, unincorporated territory of the United States
October Revolution Island	Mount Karpinsky	963 m 3159 ft	14,170	Severnaya Zemlya, Russia
Margarita Island	Cerro el Copey	957 m 3140 ft	1,020	Venezuela
Saint Lucia	Mount Gimie	950 m 3120 ft	616	Saint Lucia
Lantau Island	Lantau Peak	934 m 3064 ft	147.16	Hong Kong
Stromboli	Mount Stromboli	924 m 3031 ft	12.6	Italy, Aeolian Islands
Montserrat	Chances Peak	914 m 2999 ft	102	Montserrat, overseas territory of the United Kingdom
Gough Island	Edinburgh Peak	910 m 2990 ft	65	Part of Saint Helena, Ascension and Tristan da Cunha, an overseas territory of the United Kingdom
Mahé	Mome Seychellois	905 m 2969 ft	157.3	Seychelles
Saba	Mount Scenery	870 m 2850 ft	13	Saba, island of the Netherlands
Eysturoy	Slættaratindur	882 m 2894 ft	286.3	Faroe Islands, autonomous region of Denmark
Lord Howe Island	Mount Gower	875 m 2871 ft	14.55	Australia
Isle of Arran	Goat Fell	874 m 2867 ft	432	United Kingdom (Scotland)
Ascension Island	Green Mountain	859 m 2818 ft	88	Ascension Island, part of Saint Helena, Ascension and Tristan da Cunha, an overseas territory of the United Kingdom
Zadetkyi Kyun	unnamed point	852 m 2795 ft	176	Myanmar
Grenada	Mount Saint Catherine	840 m 2760 ft	344.5	Grenada
Penang Island	Penang Hill	833 m 2733 ft	295	Malaysia
Mauritius	Piton de la Petite Rivière Noire	828 m 2717 ft	2,040	Mauritius
Saint Helena	Diana's Peak	818 m 2684 ft	121.8	Saint Helena, part of Saint Helena, Ascension and Tristan da Cunha, overseas territory of the United Kingdom
Rùm	Askival	812 m 2664 ft	104.63	United Kingdom (Scotland)
Lewis and Harris	Clisham	799 m 2621 ft	217.898	United Kingdom (Scotland)
Jura, Scotland	Beinn an Òir	785 m 2575 ft	366.92	United Kingdom (Scotland)
Pohnpei	Nanlaud	782 m 2566 ft	334	Federated States of Micronesia
Bouvet Island	Olavtoppen	780 m 2560 ft	49	Norway
Brač	Sveti Vid	778 m 2552 ft	396	Croatia
Ko Chang	Khao Salak Phet	743 m 2438 ft	217	Thailand
North Andaman	Saddle Peak	738 m 2421 ft	2,780.7	India
Isla de los Estados	Montes Bove	823 m 2700 ft	534	Argentina
D'Urville Island	Attempt Hill	726 m 2382 ft	150	New Zealand
East Falkland	Mount Usborne	705 m 2313 ft	6,605	Falkland Islands, overseas territory of the United Kingdom
West Falkland	Mount Adam	700 m 2300 ft	4,532	Falkland Islands, overseas territory of the United Kingdom
Marmara Island	İlyas Tepe (Radar Tepe)	699 m 2293 ft	126.1	Turkey
Cocos Island	Cerro Iglesias	671 m 2201 ft	23.52	Costa Rica
Mayotte	Benara	660 m 2170 ft	374	Mayotte, overseas collectivity of France
Rarotonga	Te Manga	652 m 2139 ft	67.39	Cook Islands, self-governing state in free association with New Zealand
Montecristo	Monte della Fortezza	645 m 2116 ft	10.39	Italy, Tuscan Archipelago
Trindade Island	Pico Desejado	640 m 2100 ft	10.4	Brazil
Ko Samui	Khao Pom	635 m 2083 ft	228.7	Thailand
Isle of Man	Snaefell	621 m 2037 ft	574	Isle of Man, British crown dependency
Great Barrier Island	Mount Hobson	621 m 2037 ft	285	New Zealand
Sint Eustatius	The Quill	602 m 1975 ft	21	Sint Eustatius, island of the Netherlands
Hong Kong Island	Victoria Peak	552 m 1811 ft	78.59	Hong Kong
Sinmi-do	Unjongsan	532 m 1745 ft	52	North Korea
Ko Phuket	Khao Mai Thao Sip Song	529 m 1736 ft	547	Thailand
Tiran Island	unnamed point	525 m 1722 ft	80	Saudi Arabia
Futuna Island	Mont Puke	524 m 1719 ft	80	Wallis and Futuna, overseas territory of France
Tortola	Mount Sage	521 m 1709 ft	55.7	British Virgin Islands, overseas territory of the United Kingdom
Mljet	Veliki Grad	514 m 1686 ft	98.01	Croatia
Easter Island	Terevaka	507 m 1663 ft	163.6	Chile
Conchagüita	Volcán Conchagüita	505 m 1657 ft	21.041	El Salvador
Islay	Beinn Bheigier	491 m 1611 ft	619.6	United Kingdom (Scotland)
Saint Thomas	Crown Mountain	474 m 1555 ft	83	United States Virgin Islands, organized unincorporated territory of the United States
Mount Desert Island	Cadillac Mountain	466 m 1529 ft	280	United States, Maine United States
Hirta (St Kilda)	Conachair	430 m 1410 ft	8.5	United Kingdom (Scotland)
Saint Martin	Pic Paradis	424 m 1391 ft	88	Sint Maarten, constituent country of the Kingdom of the Netherlands
Coiba	Cerro La Torre	416 m 1365 ft	494	Panama
Guam	Lamlam	406 m 1332 ft	540	Guam, organized unincorporated territory of the United States
Antigua	Mount Obama	402 m 1319 ft	281	Antigua and Barbuda
Qeshm	unnamed point	397 m 1302 ft	1,491	Iran
Eigg	An Sgùrr	393 m 1289 ft	30.49	United Kingdom (Scotland)
Curaçao	Mount Christoffel	372 m 1220 ft	444	Curaçao, constituent country of the Kingdom of the Netherlands
Guanaja	unnamed point	365 m 1198 ft	50	Honduras
Christmas Island	Murray Hill	361 m 1184 ft	135	Christmas Island, territory of Australia
Malpelo Island	Cerro La Mona	360 m 1180 ft	1.2	Colombia
Providencia	El Pico	360 m 1180 ft	17	Colombia
Phú Quốc	unnamed point	360 m 1180 ft	575	Vietnam
Pitcairn Island	Pawala Valley Ridge	347 m 1138 ft	47	Pitcairn Islands, overseas territory of the United Kingdom
Sazan Island	unnamed point	342 m 1122 ft	5.7	Albania
Isla Gorgona	Cerro La Trinindad	338 m 1109 ft	620	Colombia
Ailsa Craig	Island Summit	338 m 1109 ft	0.99	United Kingdom (Scotland)
Barbados	Mount Hillaby	336 m 1102 ft	439	Barbados
Norfolk Island	Mount Bates	319 m 1047 ft	34.6	Norfolk Island, territory of Australia
Terre-de-Haut	Morne du Chameau	306 m 1004 ft	6.8	Guadeloupe, overseas department of France
Shadwan	unnamed point	301 m 988 ft	42.49	Egypt
Terre-de-Bas	Morne Abymes	293 m 961 ft	6.8	Guadeloupe, overseas department of France
Saint-Barthélemy	Morne du Vitet	286 m 938 ft	25	Saint-Barthélemy, overseas collectivity of France
La Désirade	Grand-Montagne	276 m 906 ft	20.64	Guadeloupe, overseas department of France
Masirah	Jabal Madrub	275 m 902 ft	649	Oman
Rangitoto Island	Rangitoto	260 m 850 ft	23.1	New Zealand
Malta	Ta'Dmejrek	253 m 830 ft	246	Malta
Babeldaob	Mount Ngerchelchuus	242 m 794 ft	331	Palau
Isle of Wight	St Boniface Down	241 m 791 ft	380	United Kingdom (England)
Miquelon	Morne de la Grande Montagne	240 m 790 ft	205	Saint Pierre and Miquelon, overseas collectivity of France
Bonaire	Mount Brandaris	241 m 791 ft	288	Bonaire, island of the Netherlands
Mjältön	Mjältötoppen	236 m 774 ft	9.94	Sweden
Island of Montreal	Mount Royal	233 m 764 ft	472.55	Canada
Anglesey	Holyhead Mountain	220 m 720 ft	712	United Kingdom (Wales)
Marie-Galante	Morne Constant	204 m 669 ft	158.1	Guadeloupe, overseas department of France
Stac An Armin	unnamed point	196 m 643 ft	0.99	United Kingdom (Scotland)
Zanzibar	unnamed point in the Koani chain	195 m 640 ft	1,666	Tanzania
Aruba	Mount Jamanota	188 m 617 ft	193	Aruba, constituent country of the Kingdom of the Netherlands
Coloane	Coloane Alto	172 m 564 ft	7.6	Macau, special administrative region of China
Singapore	Bukit Timah	166 m 545 ft	730	Singapore
Bornholm	Rytterknægten	162 m 531 ft	588.36	Denmark
Rügen	Piekberg	161 m 528 ft	926.4	Germany
Jersey	Les Platons	143 m 469 ft	119.49	Jersey, British crown dependency
Prince Edward Island	Lot 67	140 m 460 ft	5,660	Prince Edward Island, province of Canada
Grande-Terre	Morne l'Escale	136 m 446 ft	586.68	Guadeloupe, overseas department of France
Santa Catalina Island	unnamed point	133 m 436 ft	194.2	Colombia
Fasta Åland	Orrdalsklint	129 m 423 ft	685	Åland Islands, autonomous region of Finland
Bahrain Island	Jabal ad Dukhan	122 m 400 ft	604	Bahrain
Sveti Nikola Island	unnamed point	121 m 397 ft	0.36	Montenegro
Long Island	Jayne's Hill	120 m 390 ft	3,564	United States
Sherbro Island	unnamed point	120 m 390 ft	600	Sierra Leone
Whalsay	Ward of Clett	119 m 390 ft	19.7	United Kingdom (Scotland)
Wolin	Mount Grzywacz	115 m 377 ft	265	Poland
Sark	Le Moulin	114 m 374 ft	5.45	Sark, part of the Bailiwick of Guernsey, a British crown dependency
Guernsey	Hautnez	110 m 360 ft	62	Guernsey, British crown dependency
Herm	unnamed point	106 m 348 ft	2	Herm, part of the Bailiwick of Guernsey, a British crown dependency
Alderney	Le Rond But	93 m 305 ft	7.8	Alderney, part of the Bailiwick of Guernsey, a British crown dependency
Banaba	unnamed point	81 m 266 ft	6.29	Kiribati
Bermuda	Town Hill	79 m 259 ft	53.3	Bermuda, overseas territory of the United Kingdom
Nauru	Command Ridge	71 m 233 ft	21	Nauru
Niue	unnamed location near Mutalau settlement	68 m 223 ft	261.5	Niue, self-governing state in free association with New Zealand
Hiiumaa	Tornimägi	68 m 223 ft	989	Estonia
Île Royale	unnamed point	66 m 217 ft	0.28	French Guiana, overseas department of France
Anguilla	Crocus Hill	65 m 213 ft	91	Anguilla, overseas territory of the United Kingdom
Cat Island	Mount Alvernia	63 m 207 ft	389	Bahamas
Astola	unnamed point	60 m 200 ft	6.7	Pakistan
Haloul	unnamed point	57 m 187 ft	1.57	Qatar
Jerba	Guellala	52 m 171 ft	514	Tunisia
Grand Turk Island	Blue Bottle	49 m 161 ft	18	Turks and Caicos Islands, overseas territory of the United Kingdom
Cayman Brac	The Bluff	43 m 141 ft	36.26	Cayman Islands, overseas territory of the United Kingdom
Snake Island	unnamed point	41 m 135 ft	0.17	Ukraine
Vlieland	Vuurboetsduin	36 m 118 ft	315.8	Netherlands
Terschelling	Kaapsduin	31 m 102 ft	673.99	Netherlands
Texel	Loodsmanduin	26 m 85 ft	463.16	Netherlands
Ameland	Oerdblinkerd	24 m 79 ft	268.5	Netherlands
Schiermonnikoog	Wassermann-bunker	20 m 66 ft	199.07	Netherlands
Diego Garcia	unnamed point	15 m 49 ft	30	British Indian Ocean Territory, overseas territory of the United Kingdom
Tidra	unnamed point	15 m 49 ft	120	Mauritania
Arwad	unnamed point	14 m 46 ft	0.2	Syria
Abu al Abyad	unnamed point	12 m 39 ft	476	United Arab Emirates
Likiep	unnamed point	10 m 33 ft	10.26	Marshall Islands
Mukawwar	unnamed point	10 m 33 ft	300	Sudan
Dzharylhach	unnamed point	6 m 20 ft	56	Ukraine
Île du Palmier	unnamed point	6 m 20 ft	0.18	Lebanon
Dahlak Kebir	unnamed point	5 m 16 ft	58	Eritrea
West Island	unnamed point	5 m 16 ft	6.23	Cocos (Keeling) Islands, territory of Australia
Funafuti	unnamed point	5 m 16 ft	2.79	Tuvalu
Nukunonu	unnamed point	5 m 16 ft	5.5	Tokelau, territory of New Zealand
Ambergris Caye	Robles Point	4 m 13 ft	71.2	Belize
Villingili	Squid Point Peak	2.3 m 8 ft	0.27	Maldives

== Continental landmasses ==
Rank	Continental landmass	Highest point	Height	area (km²)	Country or territory containing highest point
1	Afro-Eurasia	Mount Everest	8848 m 29,029 ft	85,135,000	Nepal & China
2	Americas	Aconcagua	6962 m 22,841 ft	42,549,000	Argentina
3	Antarctica	Vinson Massif	4892 m 16,050 ft	14,200,000	Antarctica
4	Australia	Mount Kosciuszko	2228 m 7310 ft	7,688,287	Australia

== Volcanic islands ==
This list contains 50 island highpoints of volcanic origin.

Rank	Island	Highest point	Height	Country or region	Other countries or territories on island
1	Hawaii	Mauna Kea	4207 m 13,802 ft	Hawaii United States	
2	Sumatra	Mount Kerinci	3805 m 12,484 ft	Indonesia	
3	Ross Island	Mount Erebus	3794 m 12,448 ft	Antarctica	
4	Honshū	Mount Fuji	3776 m 12,388 ft	Japan	
5	Lombok	Mount Rinjani	3726 m 12,224 ft	Indonesia	
6	Tenerife	Teide	3715 m 12,188 ft	Canary Islands Spain	
7	Java	Semeru	3676 m 12,060 ft	Indonesia	
8	Sicily	Mount Etna	3403 m 11,165 ft	Italy	
9	Siple Island	Mount Siple	3110 m 10,200 ft	Antarctica	
10	Réunion	Piton des Neiges	3070 m 10,070 ft	France	
11	Maui	Haleakala	3055 m 10,023 ft	Hawaii United States	
12	Bali	Mount Agung	3031 m 9944 ft	Indonesia	
13	Seram	Mount Binaiya	3027 m 9931 ft	Indonesia	
14	Bioko	Pico Basilé	3011 m 9879 ft	Equatorial Guinea	
15	Mindanao	Mount Apo	2954 m 9692 ft	Philippines	
16	Luzon	Mount Pulag	2928 m 9606 ft	Philippines	
17	Unimak Island	Mount Shishaldin	2869 m 9413 ft	Alaska United States	
18	Fogo	Mount Fogo	2829 m 9281 ft	Cape Verde	
19	North Island	Mount Ruapehu	2797 m 9177 ft	New Zealand	
20	Heard Island	Mawson Peak	2745 m 9006 ft	Australia	
21	Sumbawa	Mount Tambora	2722 m 8930 ft	Indonesia	
22	Bougainville	Mount Balbi	2715 m 8907 ft	Papua New Guinea	
23	Negros	Mount Kanlaon	2465 m 8087 ft	Philippines	
24	Flores	Poco Mandasawu	2370 m 7780 ft	Indonesia	
25	Grande Comore	Mount Karthala	2361 m 7746 ft	Comoros	
26	Pico Island	Mount Pico	2351 m 7713 ft	Azores Portugal	
27	Atlasov Island	Alaid Volcano	2339 m 7674 ft	(Kuril Islands) Russia	
28	Guadalcanal	Mount Popomanaseu	2335 m 7661 ft	Solomon Islands	
29	New Britain	Mount Ulawun	2334 m 7657 ft	Papua New Guinea	
30	Hokkaido	Mount Asahi	2290 m 7510 ft	Japan	
31	Jan Mayen	Beerenberg	2277 m 7470 ft	Norway	
32	Tahiti	Mount Orohena	2241 m 7352 ft	French Polynesia, dependent territory of France	
33	Vancouver Island	Golden Hinde	2195 m 7201 ft	British Columbia Canada	
34	Umnak	Mount Vsevidof	2149 m 7051 ft	Alaska United States	
35	Panay	Mount Madja-as	2117 m 6946 ft	Philippines	
36	Bacan	Buku Sibela	2111 m 6926 ft	Indonesia	
37	Iceland	Hvannadalshnúkur	2110 m 6920 ft	Iceland	
38	Fergusson Island	Othona Peak	2073 m 6801 ft	Papua New Guinea	
39	Tristan da Cunha	Queen Mary's Peak	2062 m 6765 ft	Tristan da Cunha, part of Saint Helena, Ascension and Tristan da Cunha, an overseas territory of the United Kingdom	
40	Unalaska Island	Mount Makushin	2036 m 6680 ft	Alaska United States	
41	São Tomé	Pico de São Tomé	2024 m 6640 ft	São Tomé and Príncipe	
42	Coulman Island	Mount Hawkes	2000 m 6600 ft	Antarctica claimed by New Zealand	
43	Santo Antão	Tope de Coroa	1979 m 6493 ft	Cape Verde	
44	Jeju Island	Hallasan	1947 m 6388 ft	Republic of Korea	
45	Espiritu Santo	Mount Tabwemasana	1879 m 6165 ft	Vanuatu	
46	Savaiʻi	Mount Silisili	1858 m 6096 ft	Samoa	
47	Kerguelen Island	Mont Ross	1850 m 6070 ft	French Southern and Antarctic Lands, overseas territory of France	
48	Kyushu	Mount Kuju	1791 m 5876 ft	Japan	
49	Isabela Island	Volcán Wolf	1707 m 5600 ft	(Galápagos) Ecuador	
50	Sturge Island	Brown Peak	1705 m 5594 ft	Antarctica but claimed by Norway	

== See also ==
- List of elevation extremes by country
- List of elevation extremes by region
- List of countries whose highest point is not on the mainland
- List of islands (by country)
- List of islands by area
- List of islands by name
- List of islands by population
- Recursive islands and lakes

== Sources ==
- peaklist.org - majority of information about mountain heights comes from here.
- worldatlas.com - this site contains the highest mountain of each country in the world.
