= Geography of Saint Helena =

Coordinates: 15°56′S 5°42′W

St Helena island

Saint Helena is an island in the South Atlantic Ocean, about midway between South America and Africa. St Helena has a land area of 122 square kilometres and is part of the territory of Saint Helena, Ascension and Tristan da Cunha which includes Ascension Island and the island group of Tristan da Cunha.

== Physical geography ==
=== Climate ===
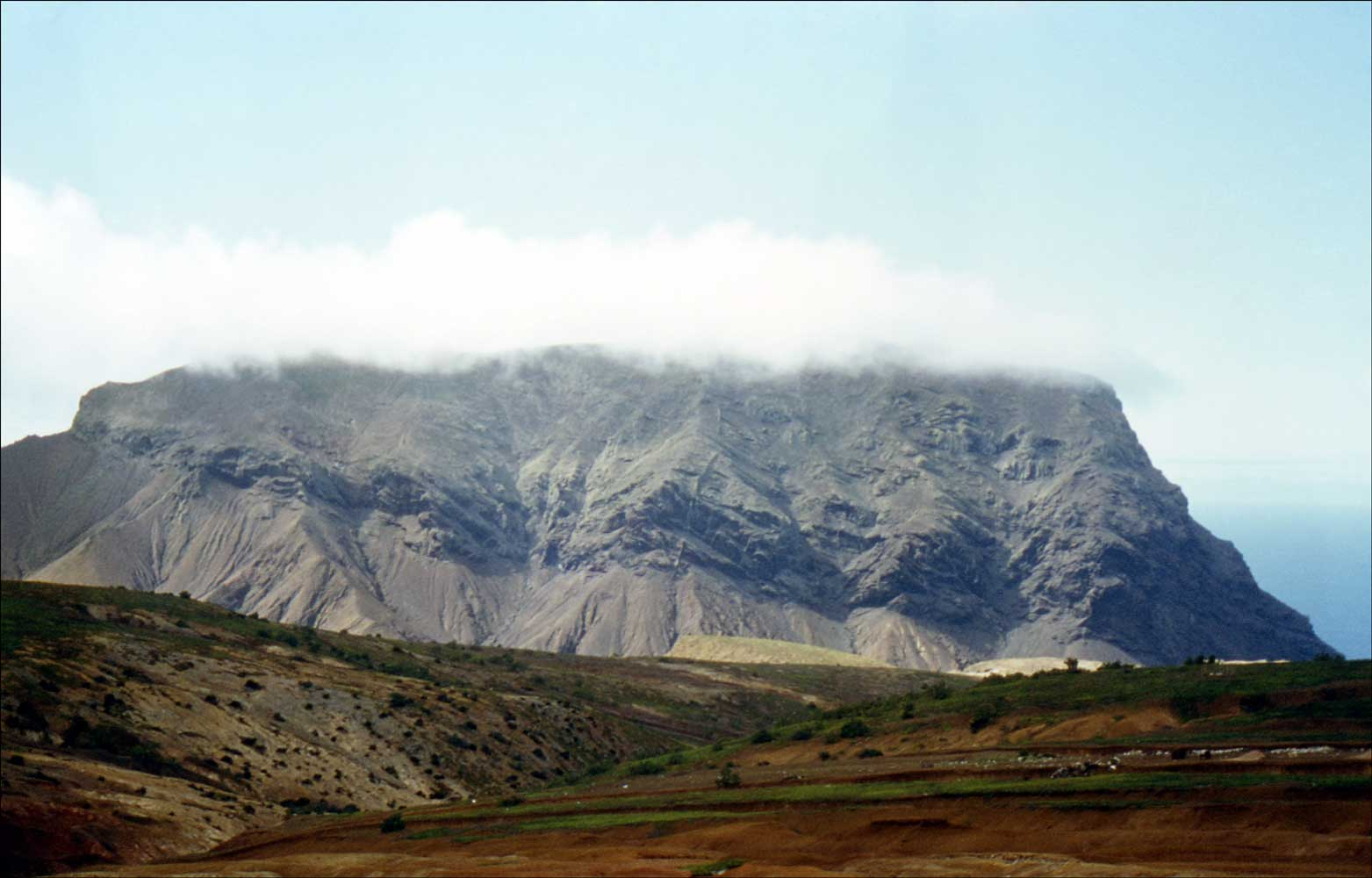
The Barn, which forms the northeast point of the island

The climate of Saint Helena island can be described as tropical, marine and mild, tempered by the Benguela Current and trade winds which blow almost continuously. Similarly, the climate of Tristan da Cunha is marine, mild and also tempered by trade winds, although the climate is temperate in nature. Ascension Island is warmer and wetter than St Helena.

=== Terrain ===
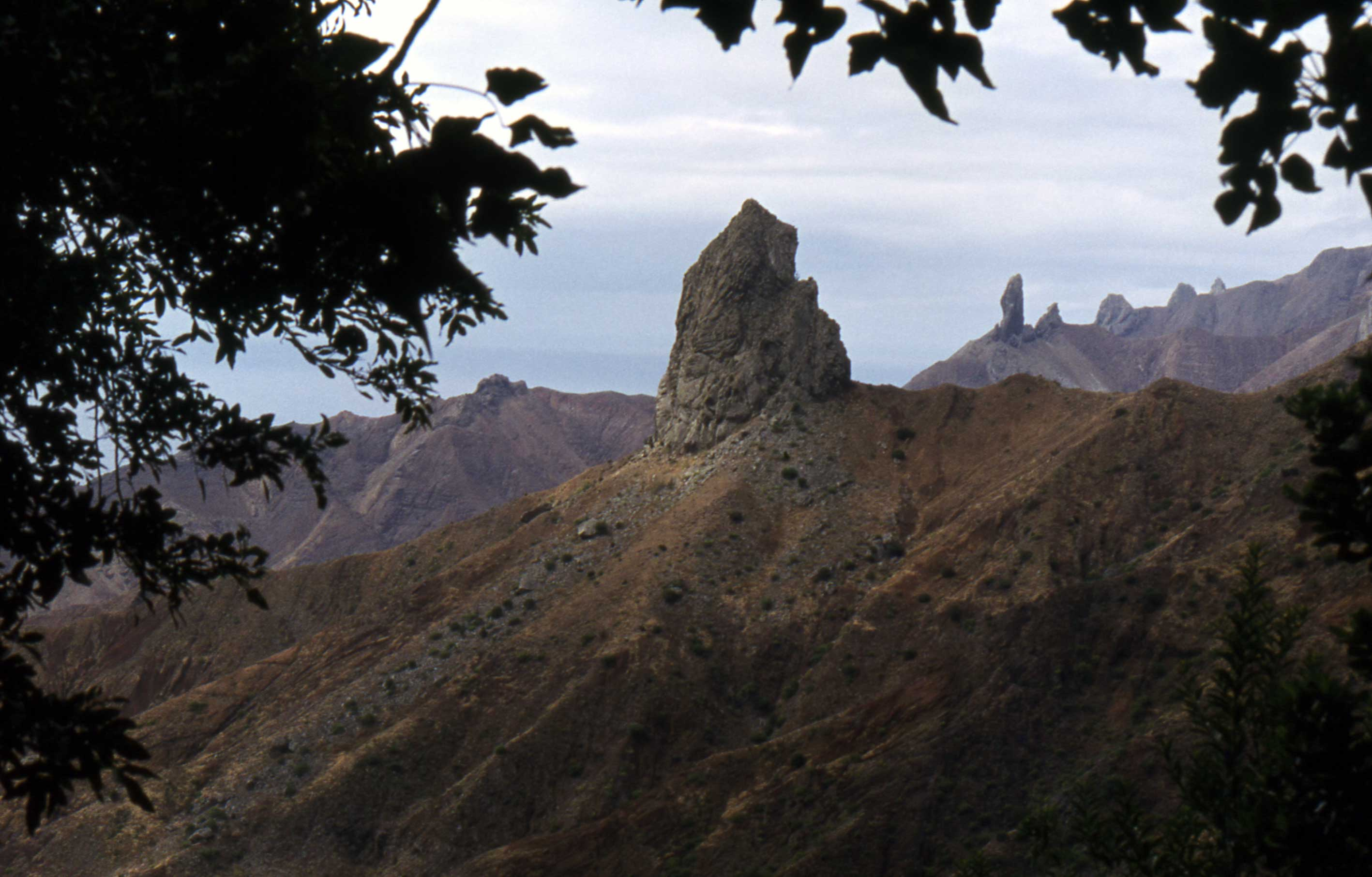
Picture of 'Lot' and 'Lot's Wife'.

Saint Helena has a rugged, volcanic terrain, with small scattered plateaus and plains, with the largest area of level ground on the island being Prosperous Bay Plain in the eastern arid area. The other islands of the group have a volcanic origin. The highest point on the island is Diana's Peak at 818 metres (2,684 ft), though Queen Mary's Peak on Tristan da Cunha is the highest in the British territory at 2,062 m.

A natural hazard on Tristan da Cunha is active volcanism, though this is not the case on St Helena itself.

=== Geology ===
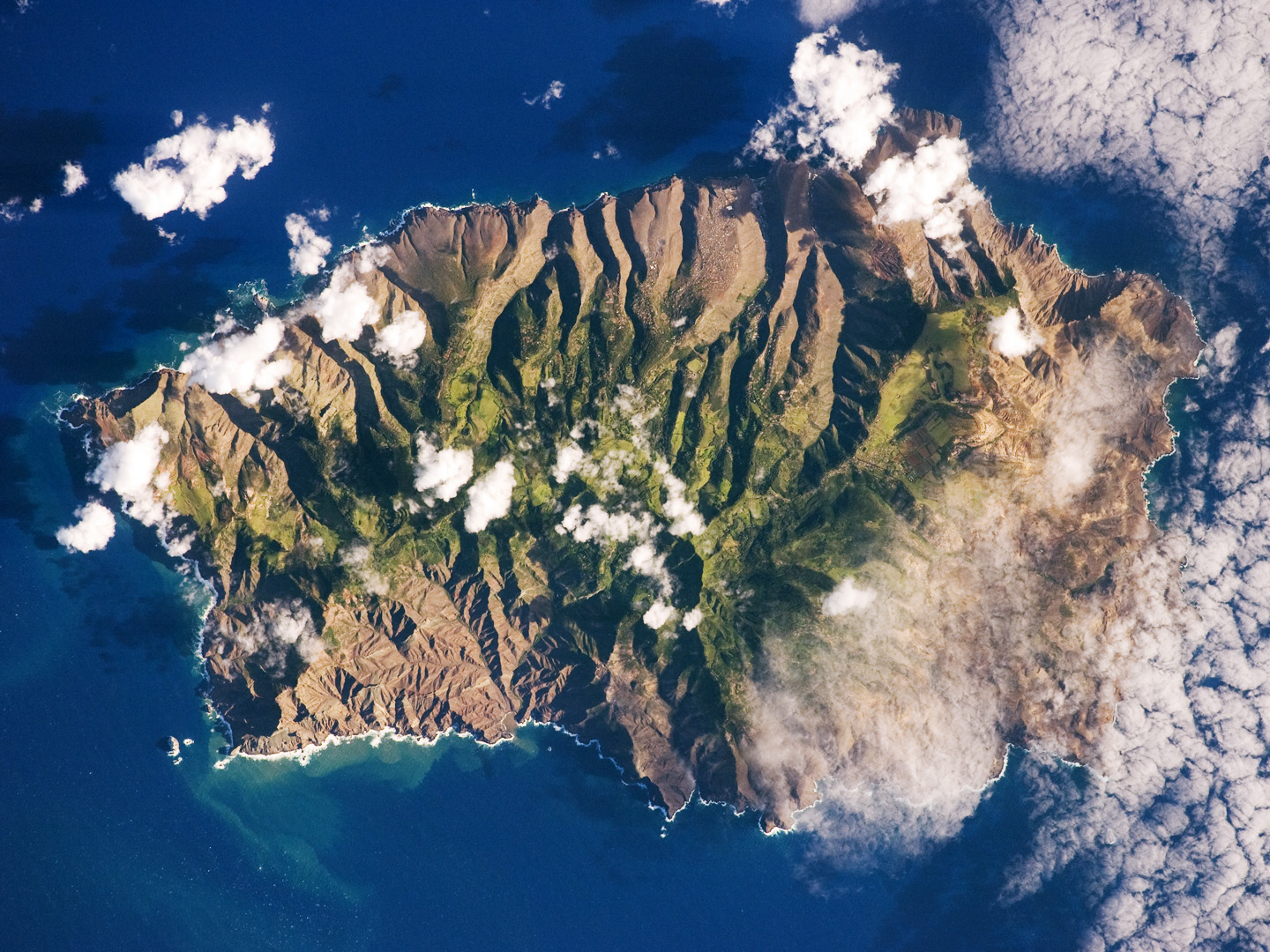
Saint Helena Island as seen from space.

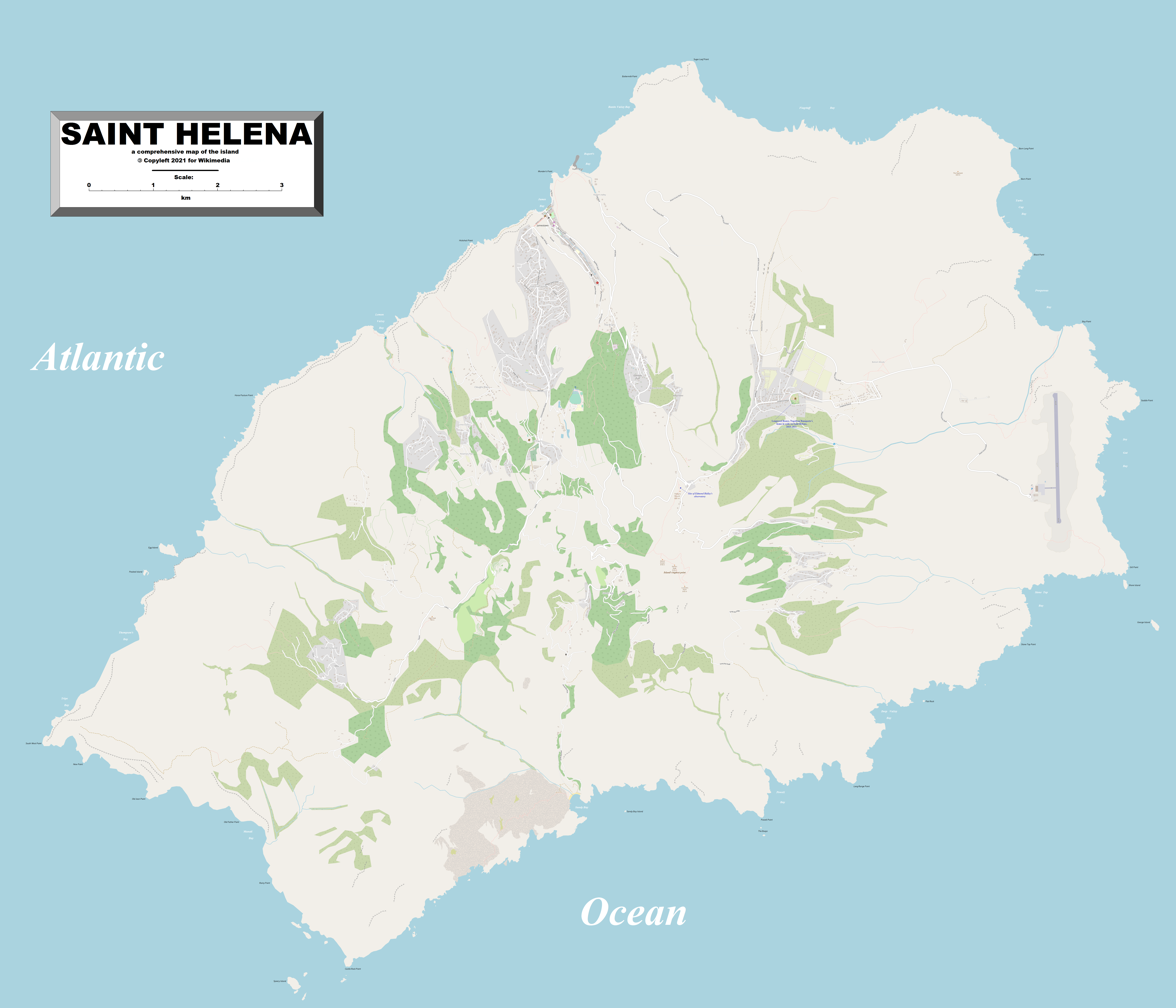
Enlargeable, detailed map of Saint Helena.

St. Helena exists because of the St. Helena hotspot which began to produce basaltic lava about 145 million years ago when it was near the constructive plate margin of the Mid-Atlantic Ridge. The movement of the African Plate away from the hotspot has left the chain of the St. Helena seamounts, which may connect with the Cameroon Volcanic Line. St. Helena, the most south westerly point on the chain, is close to the plate margin, but the last volcanic eruptions occurred about 7 million years ago.

The first investigations of St. Helena geology were made when Charles Darwin visited the island on the voyage of HMS Beagle in July 1836. He "used the observations on St Helena to formulate an intermediate hypothesis (published in 1844 in his book "Geological Observations on the volcanic islands and parts of South America visited during the Voyage of H.M.S. "Beagle") - volcanoes rise by slow, gradual and episodic events".

==== Geological features ====
The Barn is a capping of younger lavas upon weaker rocks. The Barn features cliffs on the side that faces the sea. It overlooks the pyroclasts and weak flows of Turk's Cap Valley to the south.

Taking their names from the story of Lot in the Book of Genesis, "Lot" and "Lot's Wife" are two solitary pillars of rock topping two valleys near Sandy Bay. The pillars are phonolitic intrusions, which are more resistant to erosion than surrounding volcanic features which have, in time, eroded away.

=== Natural resources ===
Saint Helena possesses fish as a main natural resource. Land use in the island group is divided between arable land (with 12.9% of the area given to this) and other uses, which occupy the remaining 87.1%.

In terms of maritime claims, St Helena has an exclusive fishing zone of 200 nautical miles, and a territorial sea of twelve nautical miles.

=== Islands ===
Just off the coast of St Helena island itself are numerous small islands. Starting from the north and running clockwise, these are: Shore Island, George Island, Rough Rock Island, Flat Rock, The Buoys, Sandy Bay Island, Black Horse Island, White Bird Island, Frightus Island, Jar Rock, Castle Point Rock, Robert Rock, Salt Rock, Speery Island, Flat Rock, The Needle, Lower and Upper Black Rock, Bird Island, Black Rock, Thompson's Valley Island, Peaked Island, Egg Island, Lady's Chair, Lighter Rock, Long Ledge, and Red Rock.

== Ecology ==
Saint Helena harbours at least 40 species of plants unknown anywhere else in the world, and Ascension is a breeding ground for sea turtles and sooty terns.

== Districts ==
The island of St Helena is divided into 8 districts, which are used for electoral and administrative purposes.

== See also ==
- List of mountains and hills of Saint Helena, Ascension and Tristan da Cunha
- List of towns in Saint Helena, Ascension and Tristan da Cunha
- Geography of Tristan da Cunha
