= Sandy Point, Tristan da Cunha =

Easternmost extremity of the island of Tristan da Cunha

Coordinates: 37°06′57.6″S 12°13′01.2″W

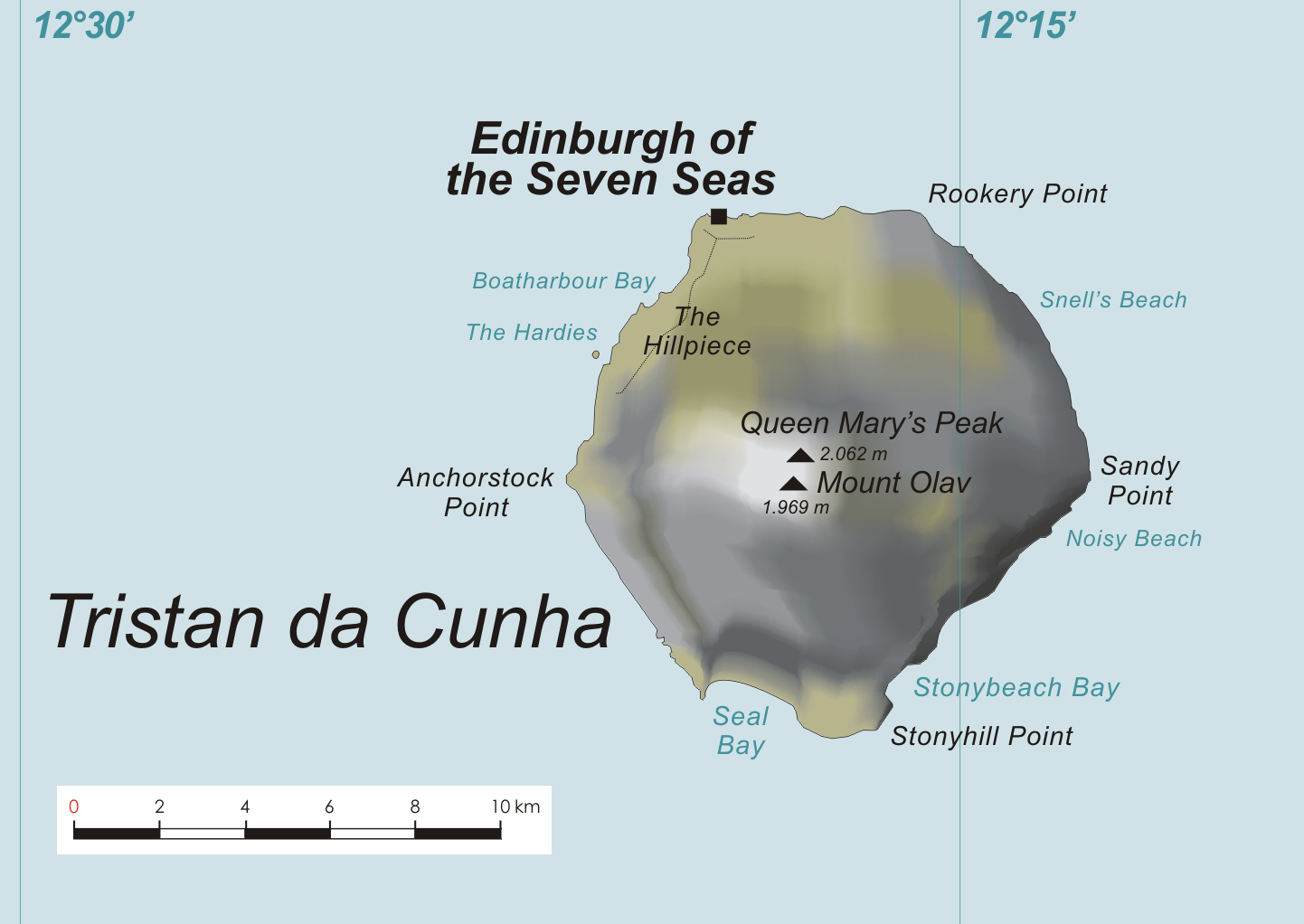
Map of Tristan da Cunha main island showing location of Sandy Point in the east

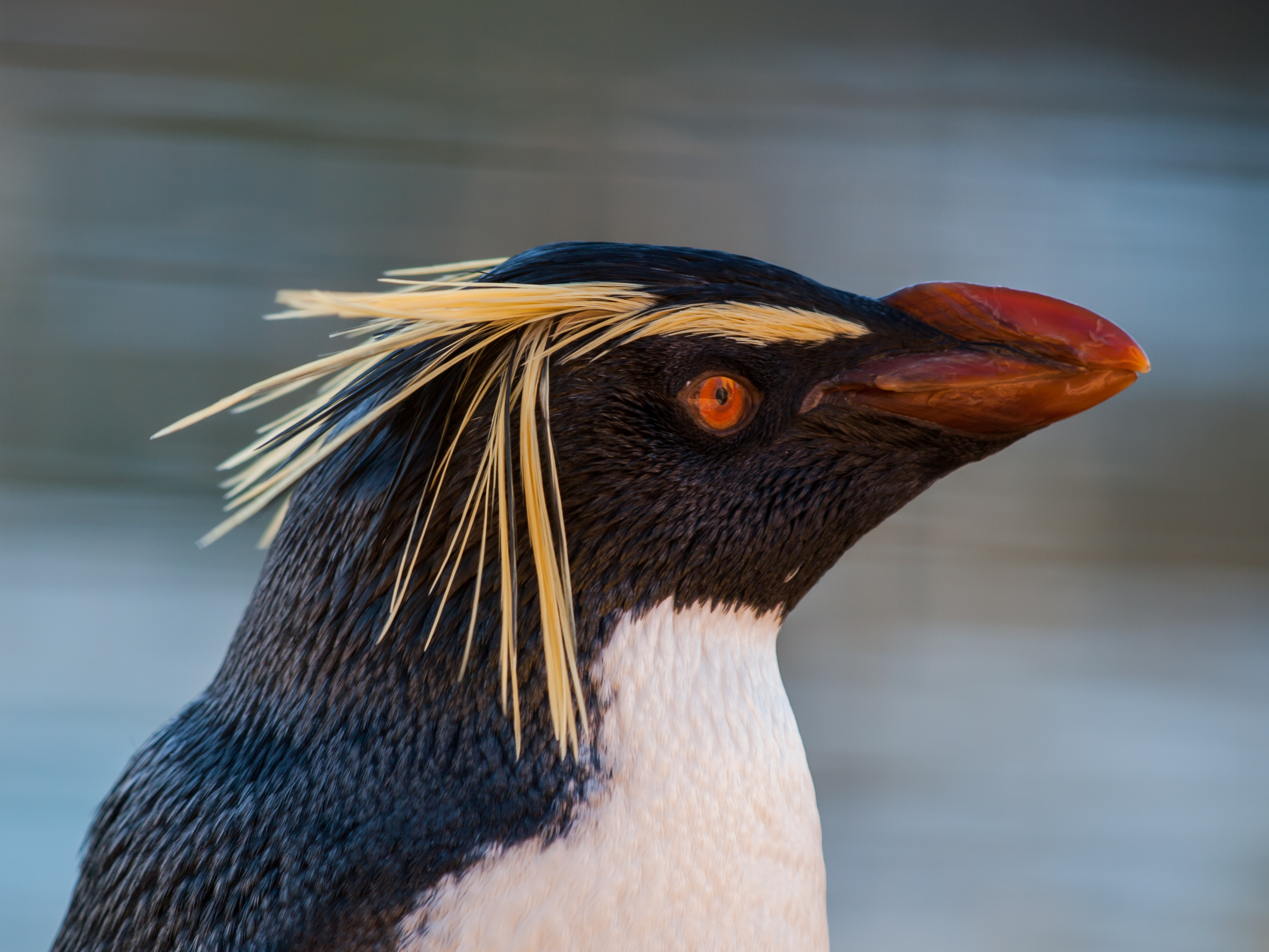
Northern rockhopper penguin, Eudyptes moseleyi

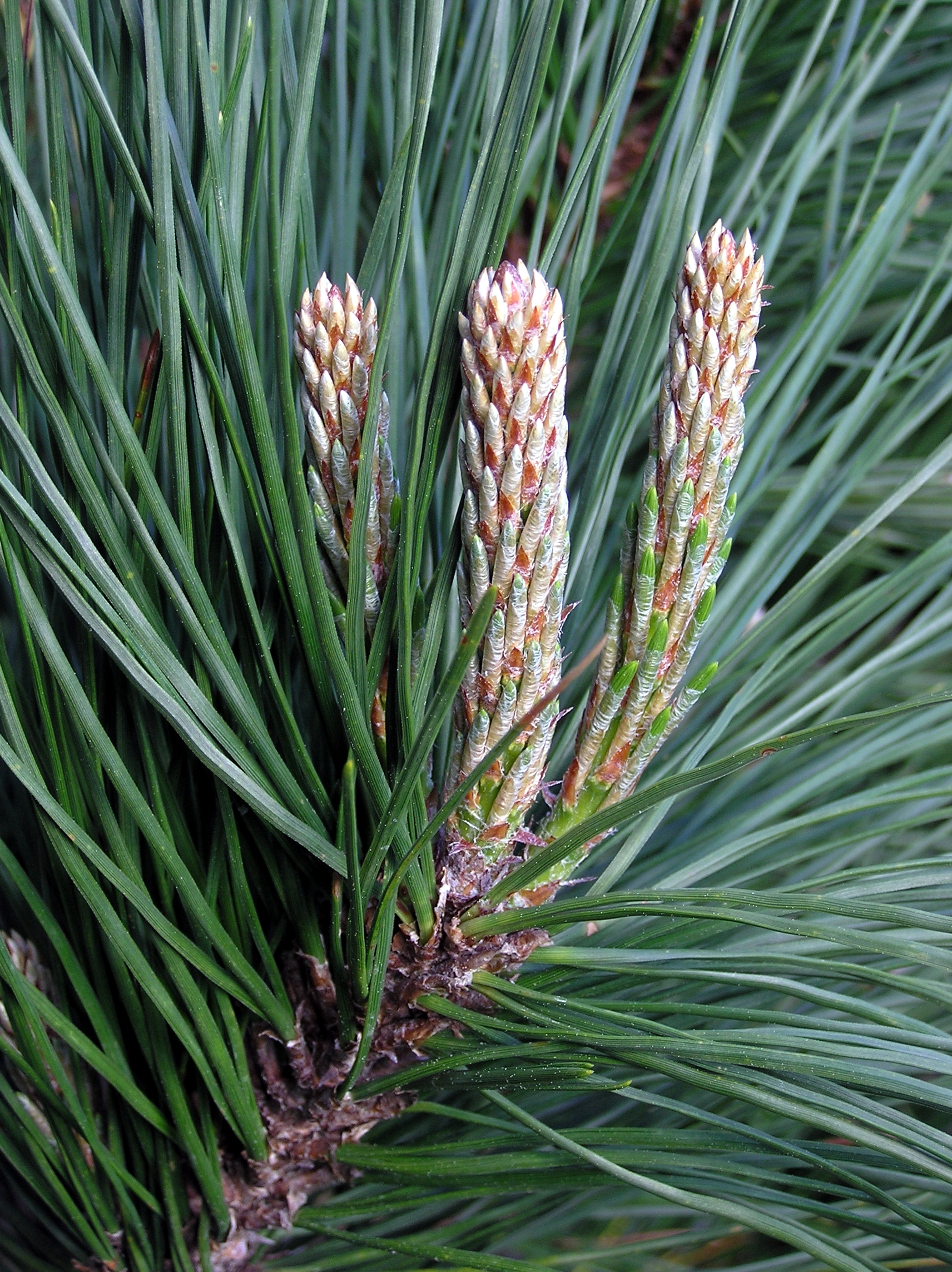
Monterey pine, Pinus radiata

Sandy Point is the easternmost extremity of the island of Tristan da Cunha in the South Atlantic Ocean. It is a distance of about 7 miles (12 km) by sea from the island's only settlement, Edinburgh of the Seven Seas. There is a beach of black volcanic sand fringed by low cliffs and a sloping plateau leading up to Tristan's mountainous interior. Its climate is warmer and drier than that of the Settlement, being in the lee of the island's prevailing winds.

A farm was established in the 1950s, and although attempts to grow vegetables were abandoned, the pine plantation and fruit trees of apple, pear, plum and peach make the area unique. The grassy slopes above the cliffs are grazed by sheep and a herd of about 15 beef cattle.

There is a colony of Northern rockhopper penguins (known on the island as pinnamins) at the east end of Sandy Point. The penguins come onshore to breed between August and December, and again for moulting between January and March. Harvesting penguin eggs is a tradition on Tristan da Cunha, but the northern rockhopper is now listed as an endangered species and eggs are no longer collected on the main island.

== History ==
In 1882 the American schooner Henry B. Paul was wrecked on the beach at Sandy Point, and black rats came ashore. Within three years they had spread to the entire island, devastating the native birdlife as well as islanders' crops.

In 1956 a number of Gough moorhens were reportedly released at Sandy Point, and have subsequently colonised the island. These "island cocks" are closely related to the extinct Tristan moorhen, and are believed by the Tristanians to eat the eggs of the Atlantic yellow-nosed albatross.

In June 2006 islanders were fishing offshore at Sandy Point when they spotted an oil platform washed ashore on the coast. The 6000-tonne platform PXXI had been lost in bad weather en route from Brazil to Singapore.

== The plantation ==
The Sandy Point plantation consists mainly of introduced Monterey pines, a species of tree native to coastal California which is known for its versatile, fast-growing, medium-density softwood. The indigenous Island Cape Myrtle is also present, along with pussy willow, grey poplar and various Eucalyptus species. The impact of invasive trees on Tristan's ecology is potentially large, with the Monterey pine being notably successful in extending its range. There have been efforts to eradicate invasive loganberry from Sandy Point, where it formed a dense undergrowth in the plantation, making the area unsuitable for nesting albatrosses and Atlantic petrels.

The islanders do not make extensive use of the plantation, preferring to import wood more cheaply from South Africa. However, in the 1980s the Sandy Point Hut was rebuilt by the Agriculture Department, allowing forestry workers to be based there.

== The orchard ==
The Tristanians traditionally held an annual "Happling Day" outing to collect fruit from the orchard. A sour cider known as Old Tom was made from the apples grown at Sandy Point. In more recent years, the once-productive orchard had been in decline, being overrun by loganberry and with many ageing trees dead or dying. In 2007 the Tristan Conservation Department restocked the area with 52 new apple trees of the Royal Gala and Golden Delicious varieties. Pear and peach trees were also imported from Cape Town as part of the restoration of the Sandy Point area.

== See also ==
- Geography of Tristan da Cunha
