= List of islands by name =

This is a list of islands by name. As this list is too long to be contained within this page, it has been divided into 26 different articles corresponding to their first letter, accessible from the table below.

== See also ==
- List of islands (by country)
- List of islands by area
- List of islands by population
- List of islands by highest point
