= List of mountains and hills of Saint Helena, Ascension and Tristan da Cunha =

This is a list of mountains and hills in Saint Helena, Ascension, and Tristan da Cunha, the British Overseas Territory, listed by height.

== List of mountains and hills ==
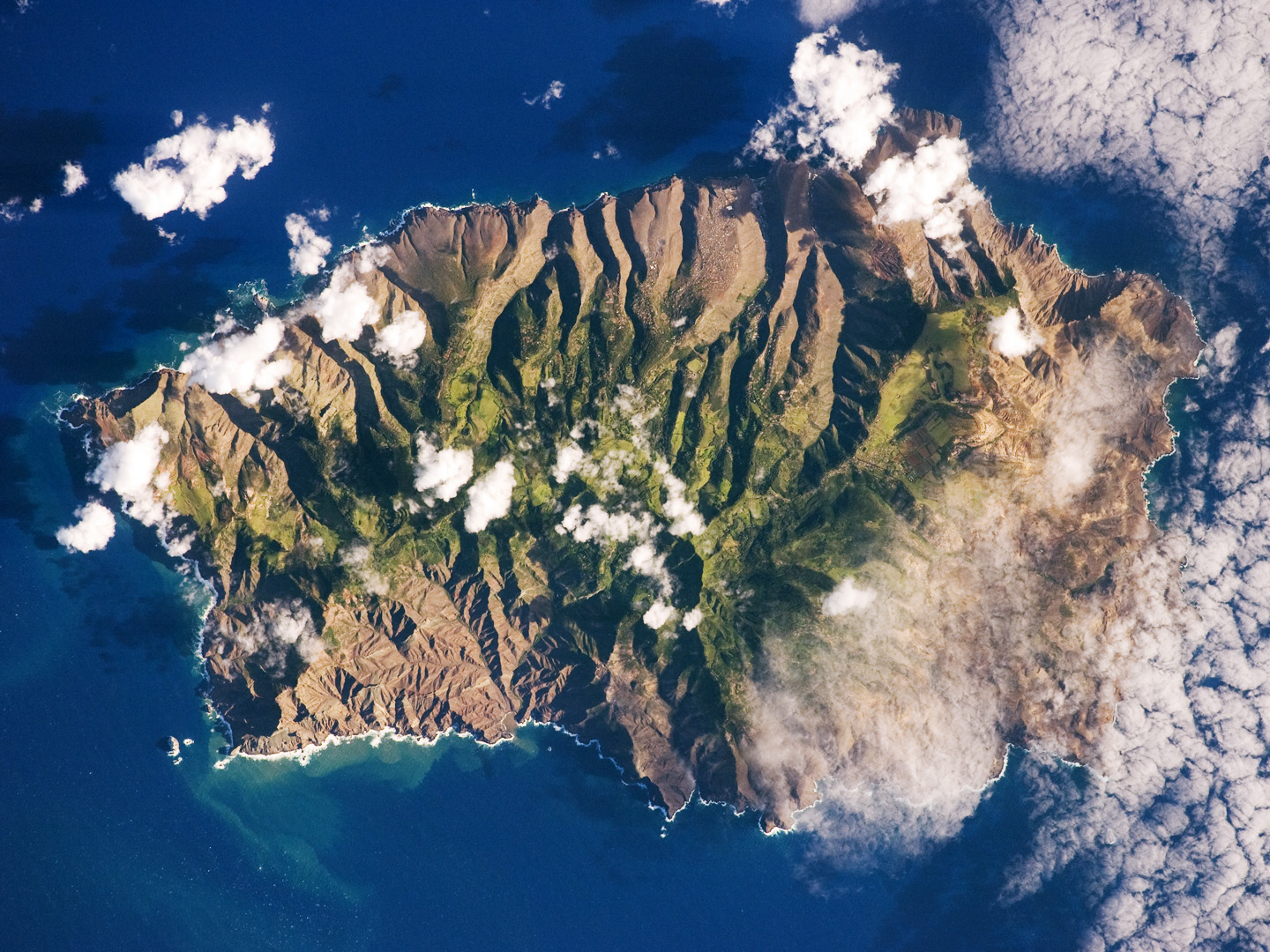
Saint Helena island seen from above

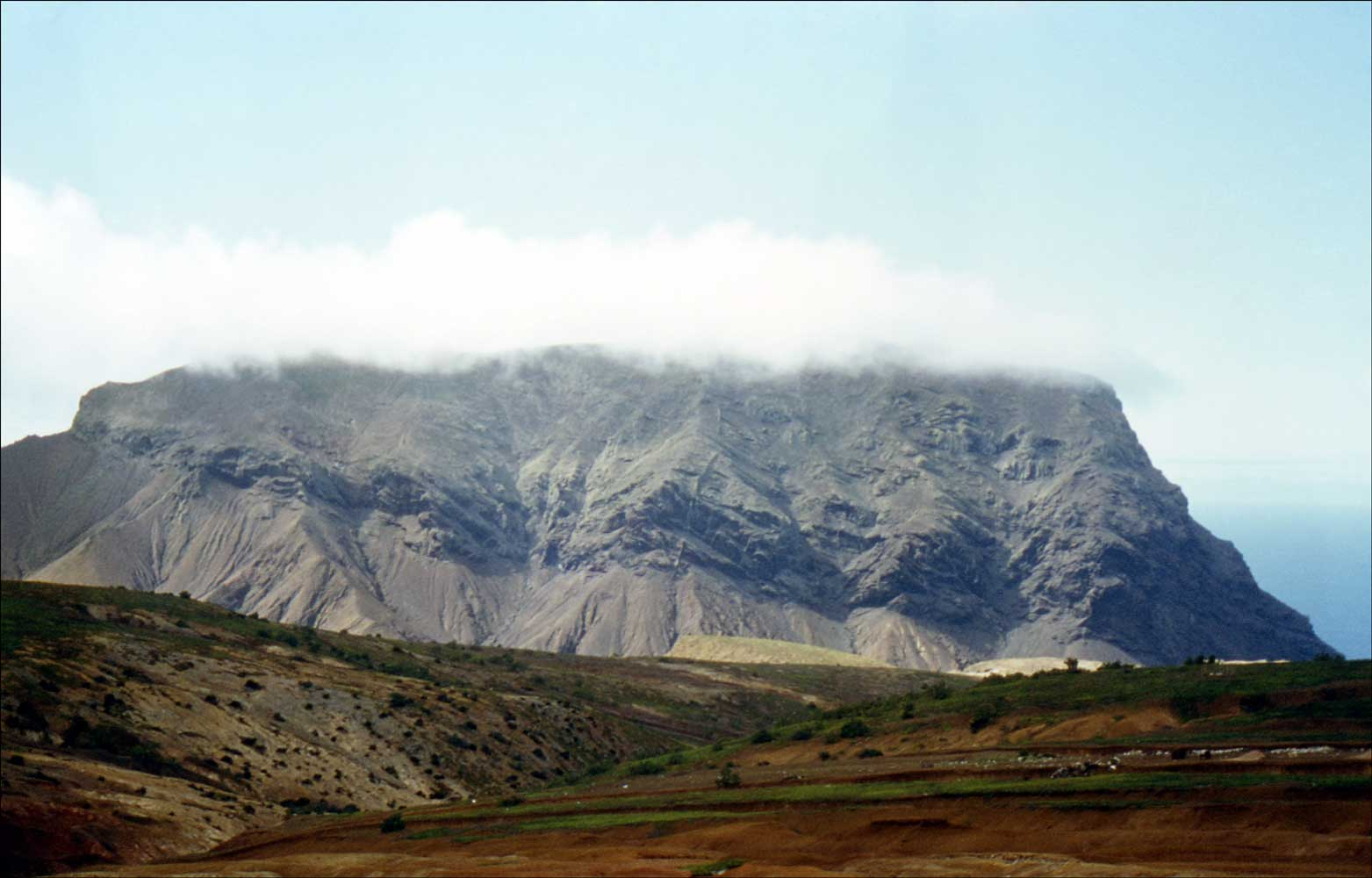
The Barn on Saint Helena

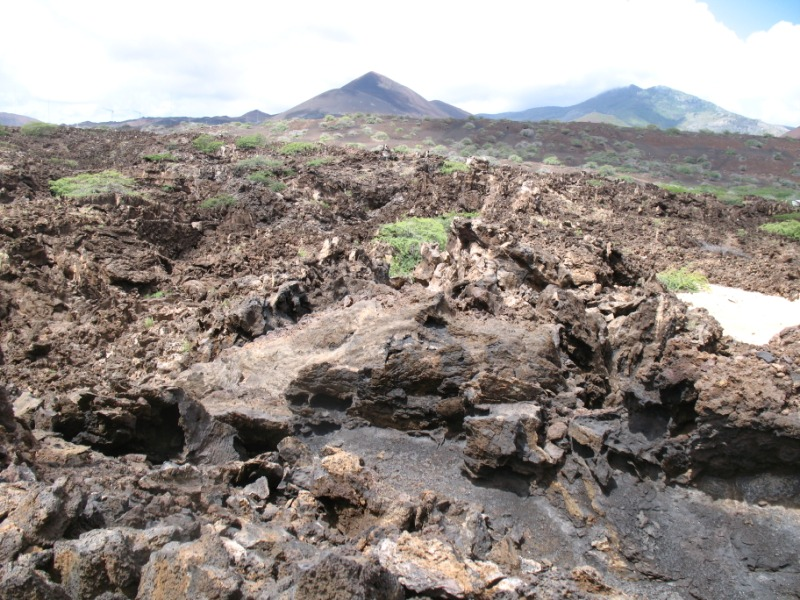
The lava field terrain on Ascension Island

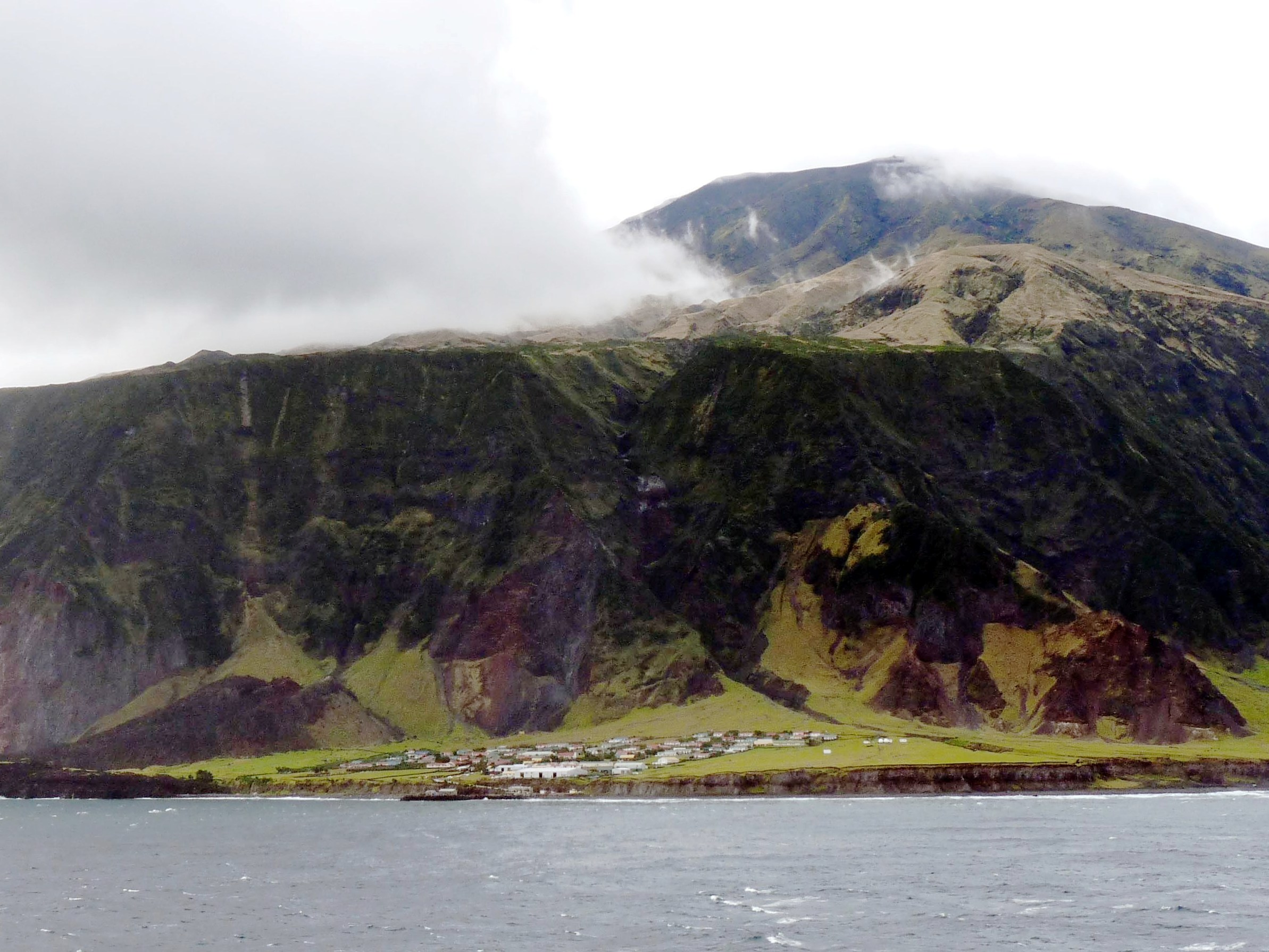
The terrain at Edinburgh of the Seven Seas on Tristan da Cunha

=== Over 1000m ===
Mountain or hill	Height	Island	Notes
Queen Mary's Peak	2,062 metres (6,765 ft)	Tristan da Cunha	an Ultra prominent peak tallest in whole overseas territory and on the island
Mount Olav	1,969 metres (6,460 ft)	Tristan da Cunha	

=== 750m to 1000m ===
Mountain or hill	Height	Island	Notes
Edinburgh Peak	910 metres (2,990 ft)	Gough Island (Tristan da Cunha)	tallest on the island
Expedition Peak	909 metres (2,982 ft)	Gough Island	
Green Mountain "The Peak"	859 metres (2,818 ft)	Ascension Island	tallest on the island
Centre Rowett	836 metres (2,743 ft)	Gough Island	highest of the Mount Rowett peaks
Diana's Peak	818 metres (2,684 ft)	Saint Helena	tallest on the island
Nigel's Cap	811 metres (2,661 ft)	Gough Island	
North Rowett	808 metres (2,651 ft)	Gough Island	one of the Mount Rowett peaks
West Rowett	805 metres (2,641 ft)	Gough Island	one of the Mount Rowett peaks
High Peak	798 metres (2,618 ft)	Saint Helena	
False Peak	757 metres (2,484 ft)	Gough Island	

=== 500m to 750m ===
Mountain or hill	Height	Island	Notes
Sandy Bay Ridge	747 metres (2,451 ft)	Saint Helena	
Sea-hen Crag	710 metres (2,330 ft)	Gough Island	
High Hill	707 metres (2,320 ft)	Saint Helena	
White Point	694 metres (2,277 ft)	Saint Helena	
Hag's Tooth	692 metres (2,270 ft)	Gough Island	
Hooper's Ridge	691 metres (2,267 ft)	Saint Helena	
Flagstaff Hill	688 metres (2,257 ft)	Saint Helena	
Halley's Mount	680 metres (2,230 ft)	Saint Helena	named for Edmond Halley
Tavistock Crag	640 metres (2,100 ft)	Gough Island	
The Saddle	639 metres (2,096 ft)	Saint Helena	
Triple Peak	634 metres (2,080 ft)	Gough Island	
The Haystack	616 metres (2,021 ft)	Saint Helena	highest point of The Barn
Weather Post	608 metres (1,995 ft)	Ascension Island	
Long Range	588 metres (1,929 ft)	Saint Helena	
Mount Argus	587 metres (1,926 ft)	Gough Island	
High Knoll	584 metres (1,916 ft)	Saint Helena	
Joan Hill	579 metres (1,900 ft)	Saint Helena	
Blue Point	573 metres (1,880 ft)	Saint Helena	
Green Hill	570 metres (1,870 ft)	Gough Island	
Stone Top Ridge	566 metres (1,857 ft)	Saint Helena	height given near "The Bellstone"
Swale's Fell	561 metres (1,841 ft)	Inaccessible Island (Tristan da Cunha)	tallest on the island; on Gony Ridge
Red Hill	546 metres (1,791 ft)	Ascension Island	("The Ring")
White Hill	543 metres (1,781 ft)	Saint Helena	
Devil's Ashpit	536 metres (1,759 ft)	Ascension Island	location of NASA Challenger Centre
Piccolo Hill	529 metres (1,736 ft)	Saint Helena	
White Hill	525 metres (1,722 ft)	Ascension Island	
Boulder Hill	510 metres (1,670 ft)	Inaccessible Island	on Gony Ridge

=== 250m to 500m ===
Mountain or hill	Height	Island	Notes
Great Stone Top	494 metres (1,621 ft)	Saint Helena	
Lot's Wife	462 metres (1,516 ft)	Saint Helena	(also a rock off the north coast of Gough Island)
Lot	454 metres (1,490 ft)	Saint Helena	
Cairn Peak	323 metres (1,060 ft)	Inaccessible Island	
Sisters Peak	445 metres (1,460 ft)	Ascension Island	
Boxwood Hill	434 metres (1,424 ft)	Saint Helena	
Sandy Bay Barn	431 metres (1,414 ft)	Saint Helena	
Rupert's Hill	405 metres (1,329 ft)	Saint Helena	
Horse Point	403 metres (1,322 ft)	Saint Helena	
Round Hill	388 metres (1,273 ft)	Inaccessible Island	
Denstone Hill	384 metres (1,260 ft)	Inaccessible Island	
High Ridge	378 metres (1,240 ft)	Nightingale Island (Tristan da Cunha)	tallest on the island
Spoon Crater	364 metres (1,194 ft)	Ascension Island	
Traveller's Hill	357 metres (1,171 ft)	Ascension Island	also name of nearby RAF base
The Fid	355 metres (1,165 ft)	Gough Island	
South East Crater	349 metres (1,145 ft)	Ascension Island	
Joe's Hill	330 metres (1,080 ft)	Inaccessible Island	
Lady Hill	329 metres (1,079 ft)	Ascension Island	
South Hill	323 metres (1,060 ft)	Inaccessible Island	
	300 metres (980 ft)	Nightingale Island (Tristan da Cunha)	
Sugar Loaf Hill	272 metres (892 ft)	Saint Helena	
Ladder Hill	268 metres (879 ft)	Saint Helena	
Cross Hill	263 metres (863 ft)	Ascension Island	

=== 50m to 250m ===
Mountain or hill	Height	Island	Notes
Bears Back	240 metres (790 ft)	Ascension Island	
Dark Slope Crater	234 metres (768 ft)	Ascension Island	
Broken Tooth	228 metres (748 ft)	Ascension Island	("East Crater")
South Gannet Hill	228 metres (748 ft)	Ascension Island	
Goat Pound Ridge	227 metres (745 ft)	Saint Helena	
Richmond Hill	210 metres (690 ft)	Gough Island	SE of the island, near the Meteorological Station
Pig Beach Hill	207 metres (679 ft)	Inaccessible Island	
Egg Island	79 metres (259 ft)	Saint Helena	

=== Other hills and hill features ===
NB: Many of these hills and features are over 200m.

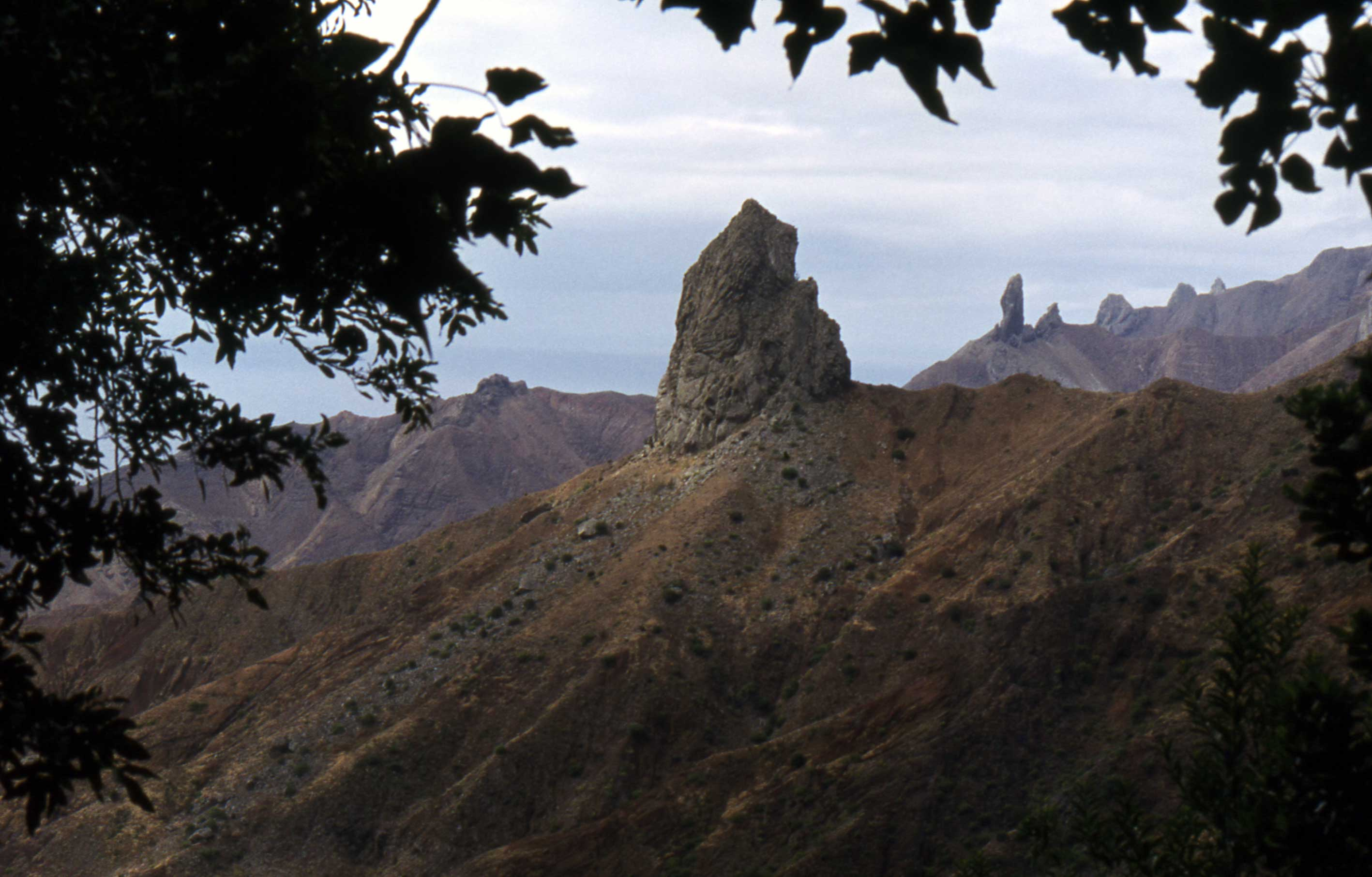
Lot and Lot's Wife (in background)

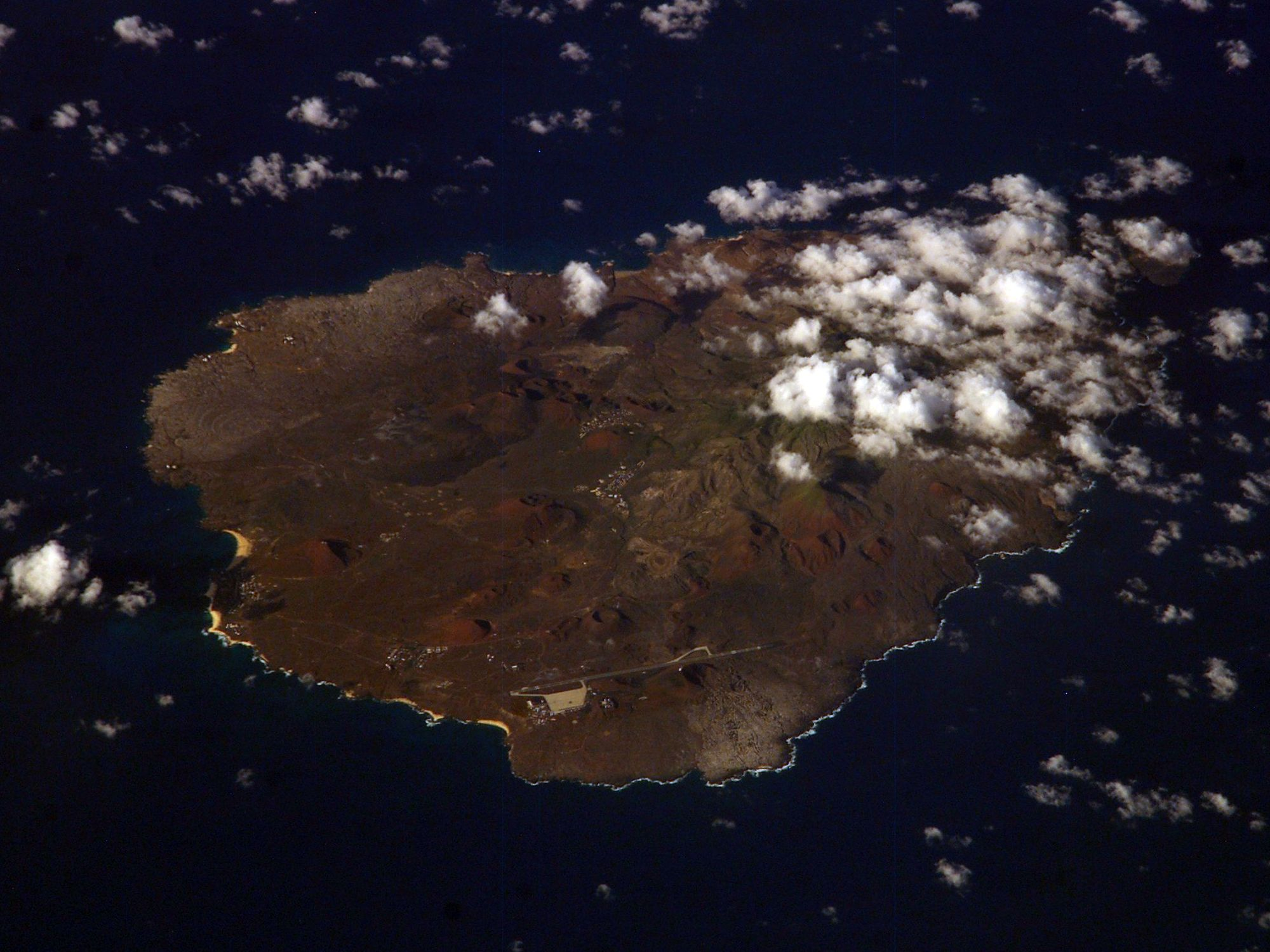
Ascension Island (note the volcanic craters)

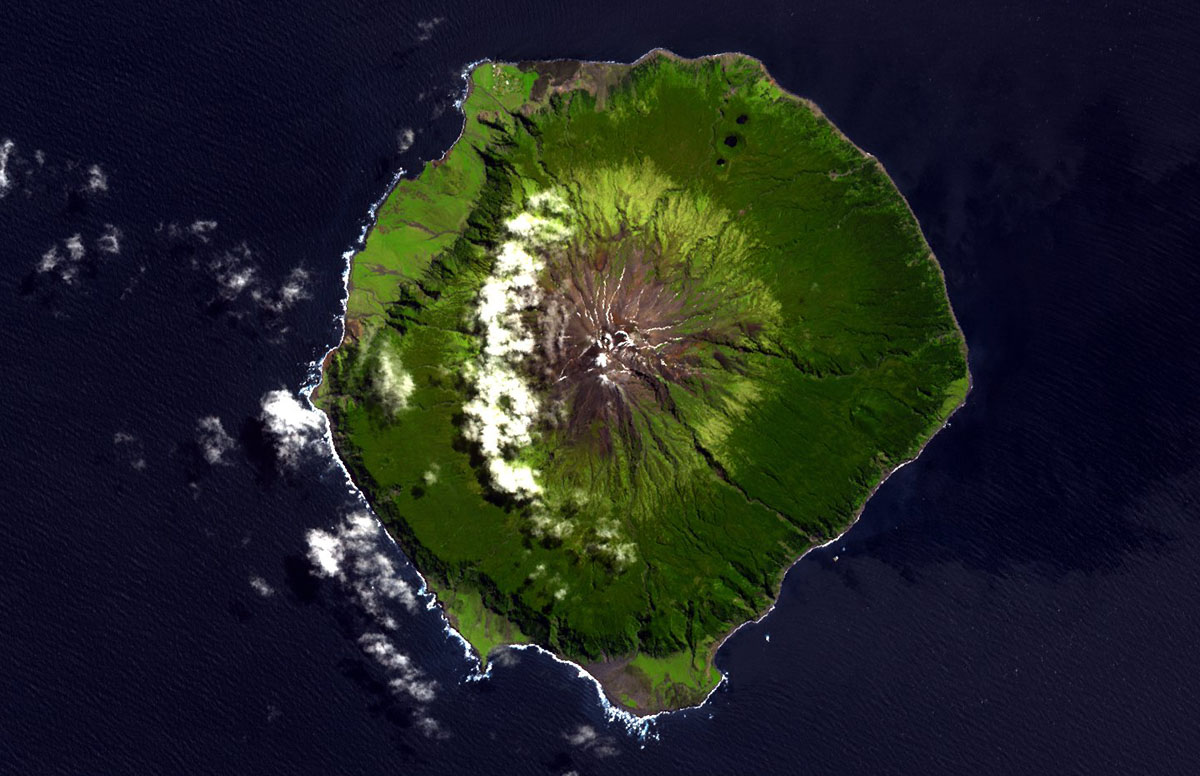
Tristan da Cunha island

Mountain or hill	Height	Island	Notes
Cat Hill		Ascension Island	location of the main US base
Letter Box		Ascension Island	
Devil's Riding School		Ascension Island	a crater
Devil's Cauldron		Ascension Island	a crater, near Weather Post
Round Hill		Ascension Island	
Booby Hill		Ascension Island	
Holland's Crater		Ascension Island	
Dune Hills		Inaccessible Island	
Long Ridge		Inaccessible Island	
Little Stone Top		Saint Helena	
Mount Vesey		Saint Helena	
Drummond's Point		Saint Helena	
Munden's Mount		Saint Helena	
Green Hill		Saint Helena	
Cuckold's Point		Saint Helena	near Diana's Peak
Mount Actaeon		Saint Helena	near Diana's Peak
Mount Ross		Saint Helena	
Bunker's Hill		Saint Helena	
Silver Hill		Saint Helena	
Blue Hill		Saint Helena	
The Saddle		Saint Helena	
Beach Hill		Saint Helena	
Horse Point		Saint Helena	
Turk's Cap		Saint Helena	
Thompson's Hill		Saint Helena	
King & Queen Rocks		Saint Helena	
Horse Ridge		Saint Helena	
Dry Gut Hill		Saint Helena	
Botley's Point		Saint Helena	
Rock Mount		Saint Helena	
Sheep Knoll		Saint Helena	
Powell's Valley Hill		Saint Helena	
Brown's Hill		Saint Helena	
Bonfire Ridge		Saint Helena	
Woodland's Hill		Saint Helena	
Isaac's Hill		Saint Helena	
Round Hill		Tristan da Cunha	
Cave Gulch Hill		Tristan da Cunha	
Red Hill		Tristan da Cunha	

== Maps ==
Topographic map of Saint Helena

Topographic map of Ascension Island

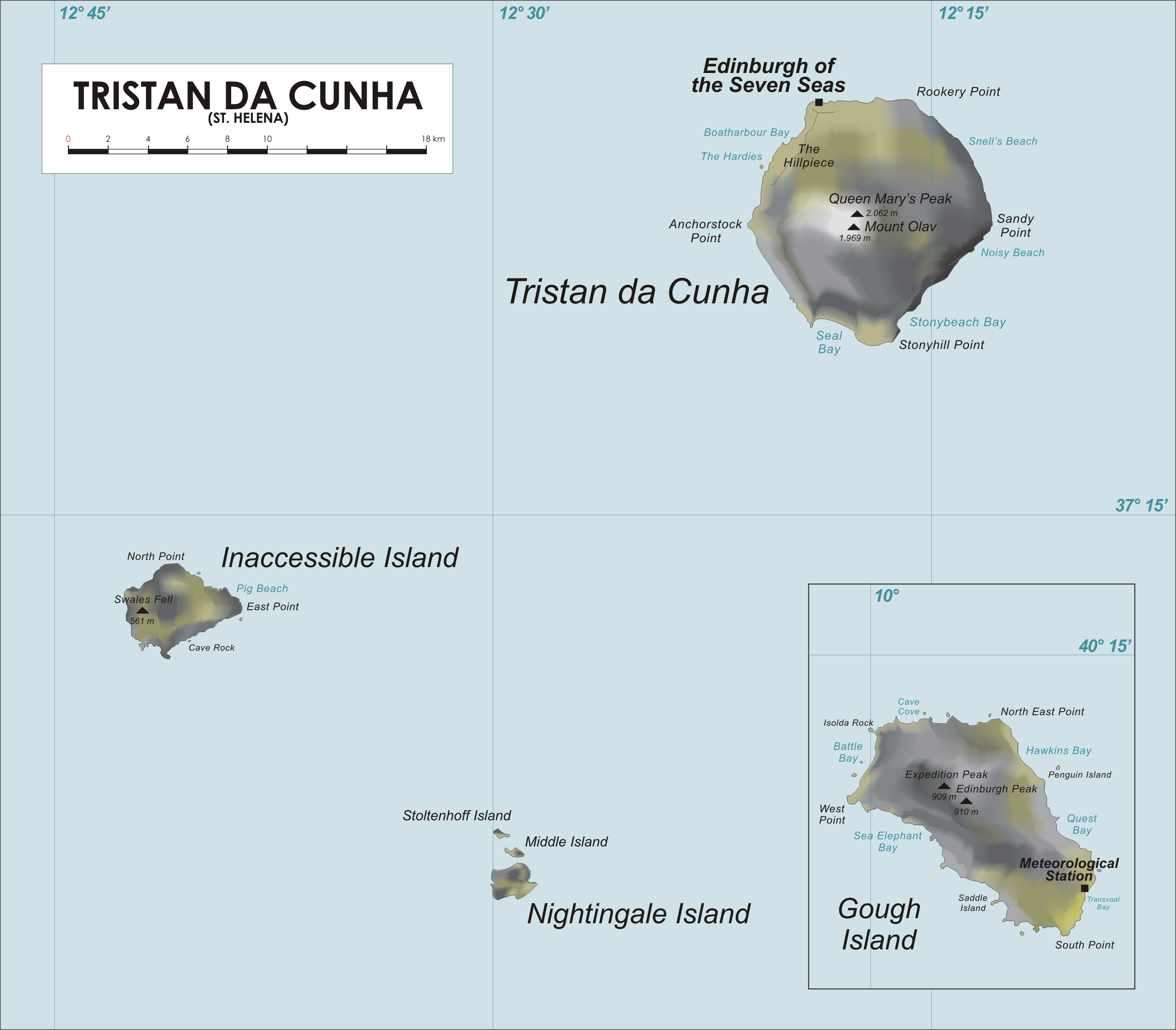
The Tristan da Cunha archipelago

Relief map of Gough Island

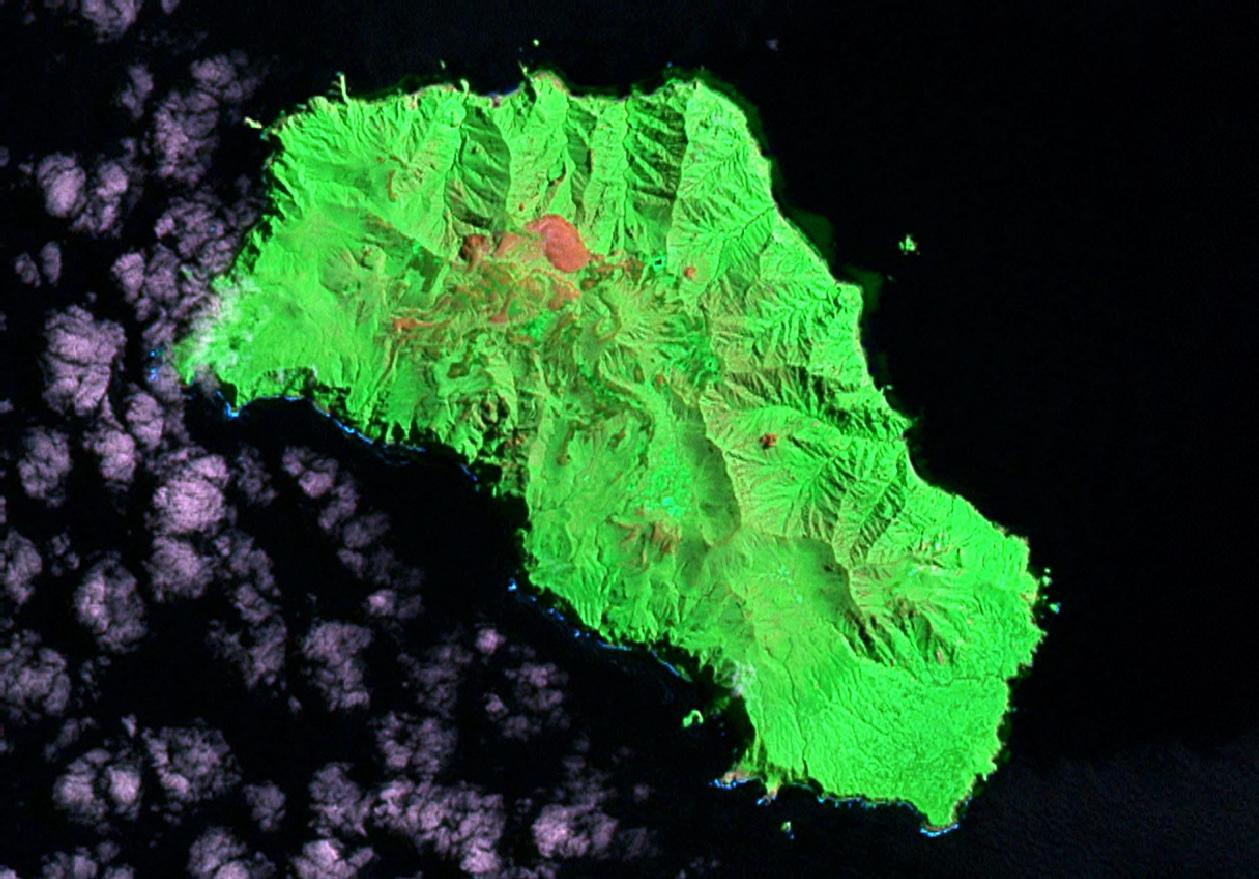
Satellite map of Gough Island

== See also ==
- Geography of Saint Helena
- Geography of Tristan da Cunha

== Sources ==
- Gizimap.hu: St Helena & Dependencies (2011)
- Map of Nightingale Island in «Vegetation and checklist of Inaccessible Island, central South Atlantic Ocean, with notes on Nightingale Island»
