= Edinburgh Peak =

Mountain on Gough Island in the South Atlantic Ocean

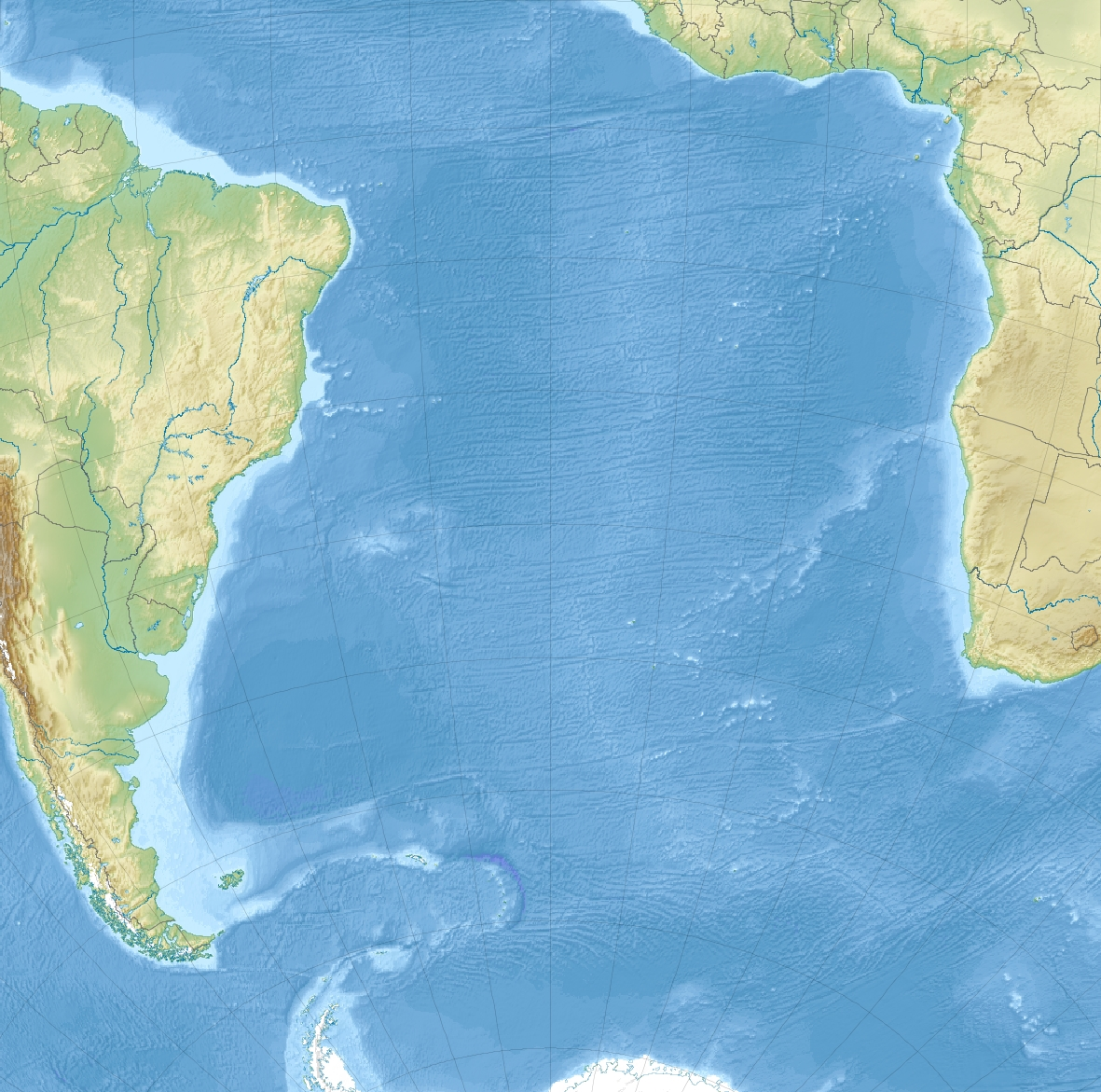
- Location within South Atlantic

Highest point
- Elevation: 902 m (2,959 ft)
- Coordinates: 40°18′7″S 9°57′47″W

Geography
- Location: Gough Island, St Helena, Ascension and Tristan da Cunha, UK

Climbing
- First ascent: unknown

Edinburgh Peak is the highest mountain in Gough Island, South Atlantic Ocean.

== Geography ==
This 902 m (2,959 ft) high peak is the highest point of a ridge that runs in a roughly NW/SE direction in the central area of Gough Island. Slightly lower Expedition Peak is located close to it. The island is part of the Tristan da Cunha Archipelago, an outlying territory of the United Kingdom. The mountain is an extinct volcano which erupted about 2,400 years ago.

== See also ==
- List of islands by highest point
- List of mountains and hills of Saint Helena, Ascension and Tristan da Cunha
