= Mjältön =

Island in the High Coast, Sweden

Coordinates: 63°03′N 18°31′E

Aerial photograph of Mjältön.

Mjältön is an island in the middle of The High Coast in Sweden. Mjältön is the highest island in Sweden, with a height of 236 meters above sea level.
