= Command Ridge =

Highest point in Nauru

- Location within Nauru

Highest point
- Elevation: 65 m (213 ft)
- Prominence: 65 m (213 ft)
- Listing: Country high point
- Coordinates: 0°31′52″S 166°55′00″E

Geography
- Location: Aiwo district, Nauru

Geology
- Mountain type: Hill (Limestone)

Command Ridge is considered the highest point of Nauru, with an elevation of 65 metres (213 ft).

Passing close to Command Ridge is the boundary between Aiwo and Buada districts.

== History ==
Nauru was once occupied by the Japanese during World War II. Command Ridge contained their communications bunker on Nauru, and some remnants of it remain, including rusted WWII guns/artillery. The bunker itself contains Japanese writing on the walls

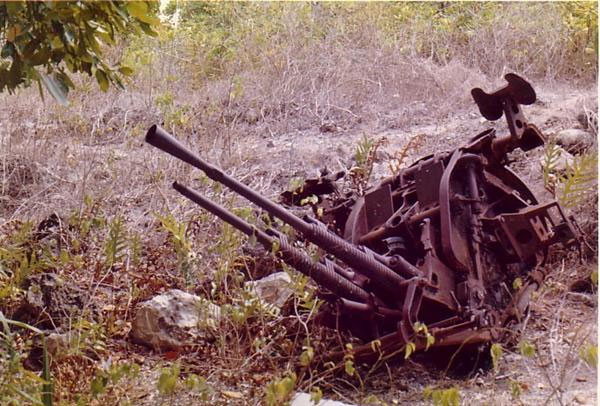
Japanese relic from World War II on Command Ridge.

== See also ==
- Geography of Nauru
