= Queen Mary's Peak =

Mountain in Tristan da Cunha

- Tristan da Cunha
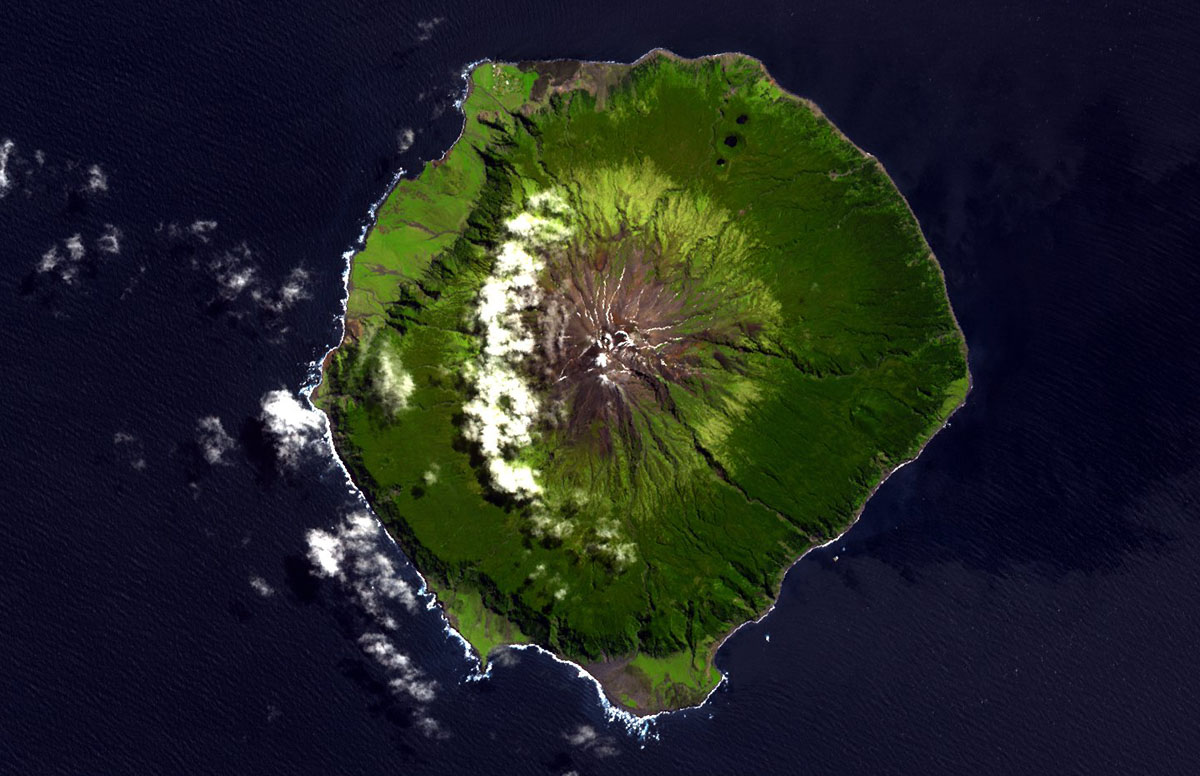
- Satellite photo of Tristan da Cunha

Highest point
- Elevation: 2,062 m (6,765 ft)
- Prominence: 2,062 m (6,765 ft)
- Listing: Ultra; Ribu
- Coordinates: 37°06′40″S 12°17′18″W

Geography
- Location on Tristan da Cunha
- Location: Tristan da Cunha

Geology
- Rock age: 148 ± 8 ka
- Mountain type: Shield volcano
- Last eruption: October 1961–March 1962

Climbing
- First ascent: About 1 January 1817

Queen Mary's Peak is an active stratovolcano and the summit of the island of Tristan da Cunha, in the South Atlantic Ocean. It has an elevation of 2,062 metres (6,765 ft) above sea level. It is named after Mary of Teck, the Queen consort of King George V. It is the highest point of the British overseas territory of Saint Helena, Ascension and Tristan da Cunha, and the highest point of any British territory with a permanent population. Queen Mary's Peak is ranked 17th by topographic isolation.

== Outline ==
The mountain is the peak of the massive shield volcano which forms the island. A 300 m (1,000 ft) wide summit crater caps the peak, and it contains a heart-shaped crater lake. This lake is normally frozen during the winter, and the upper slopes of the volcano are covered in snow.

The first observed eruption began on 10 October 1961 from a vent on the north shore of the island and continued into March 1962. The entire population of the island (264) had to be evacuated and did not return until 1963. There was an eruption during the early 18th century on the main peak on Tristan da Cunha when the island was not inhabited; islanders were unaware about previous volcanic activity before the 1961 eruption, as they could not find any evidence of previous eruptions. There was also a 2004 eruption which happened underwater, as there was an earthquake on Tristan da Cunha, as well as pumice that was picked up by fishermen, suggesting that the volcano is still active.

Queen Mary's Peak was used by sailors on the route from Europe to the Indian Ocean and beyond as a navigational aid. In the 17th century, the East India Company instructed captains to sail via Tristan. In 2004, Ellen MacArthur sighted the Peak on her record-breaking circumnavigation of the world.

== Climbing the peak ==
The first known attempt to climb the peak was in 1793 by the French naturalist Louis-Marie Aubert du Petit-Thouars, but this was without success. However, from this expedition, hundreds of plants were collected and catalogued. In January 1817, the first successful climb was made to the peak. Queen Mary's Peak is a steep climb and can take 5 to 10 hours, depending on the capability of the walker. The walk and climb is allowed only when accompanied by a local guide.

Queen Mary's Peak is the brand name for Tristan da Cunha island knitwear, which is exported to New Zealand.

== See also ==
- Geography of Tristan da Cunha
- List of mountains and hills of Saint Helena, Ascension and Tristan da Cunha
- List of ultras of Antarctica
- List of volcanoes in Tristan da Cunha

== Other projects ==
Media related to Queen Mary's Peak at Wikimedia Commons
