= Tazing Dong =

Mountain in Bangladesh

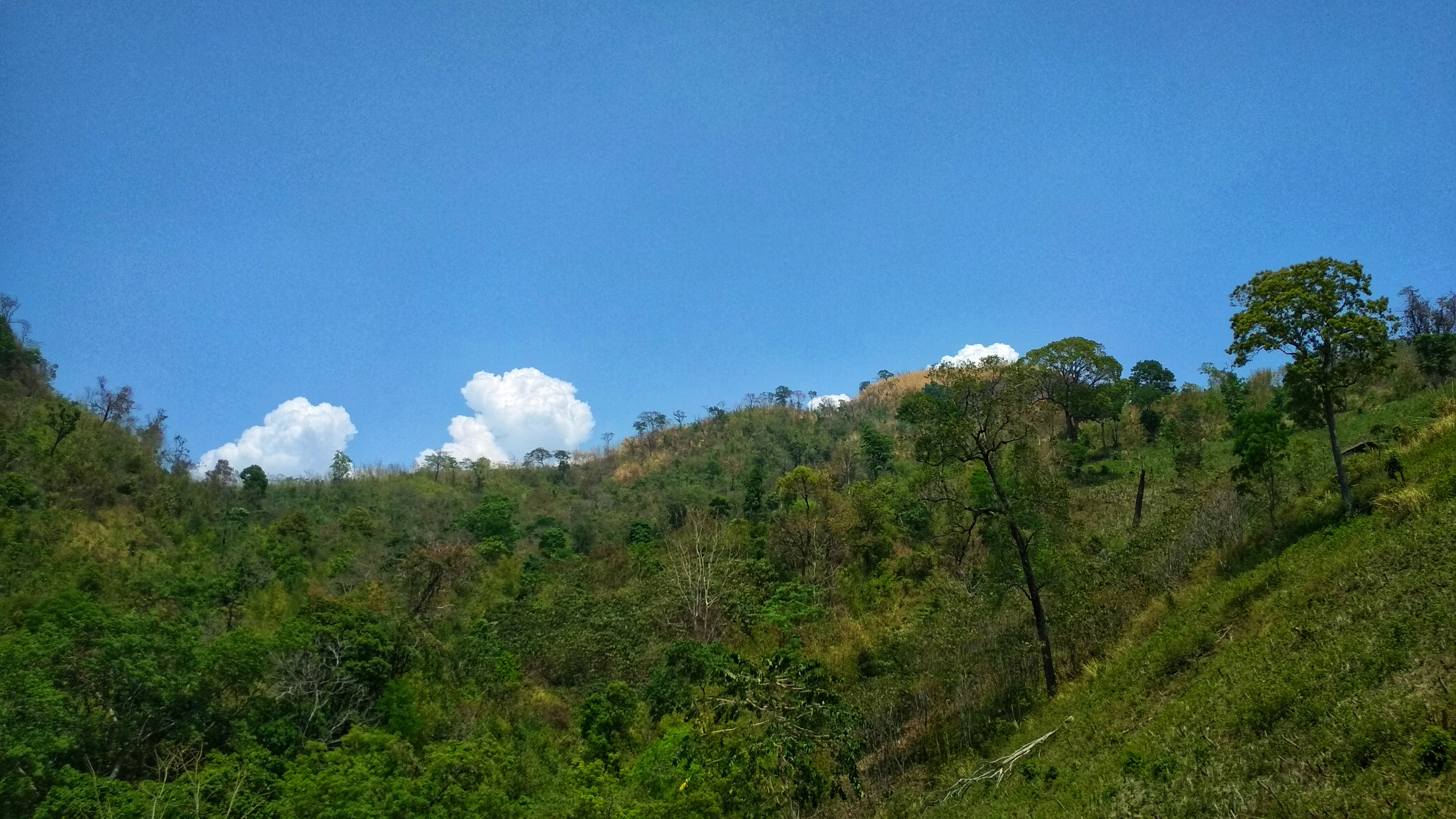

Highest point
- Elevation: 830 m (2,720 ft)

Geography
- Location: Saichol Mountain ranges, Ruma Upazila, Bandarban
- Region: Bangladesh

Geology
- Mountain type: Peak

Tazing Dong (also known as Bijoy) is a peak in Bangladesh, with an elevation of 830 m. It is located in the "Saichol Mountain ranges", Ruma Upazila, Bandarban District, in southeastern Bangladesh. It is sometimes claimed to be the highest mountain in Bangladesh. According to 2015 research using SRTM data, the actual highest peak is the nearby Saka Haphong, with an elevation of approximately 1052 m.

== Geography ==
Tazing Dong is located in the "Saichol Mountain ranges", Remakri Union, Ruma Upazila, Bandarban District, Bangladesh. It is 25 kilometres (16 mi) from Upazila Sadar of Ruma Upazila. There is a tribal village near this peak.

== Etymology ==
In the local tribal dialect, "tazing" translates to "big" or "highest," while "dong" means "mountain" or "peak." The name of the peak originates from these two words, and it has been officially designated as "Bijay Mountain."

== See also ==
- List of mountains of Bangladesh
- Keokradong
- Saka Haphong
