= Thingdawl Te Tlang =

Thingdawlte Tlang
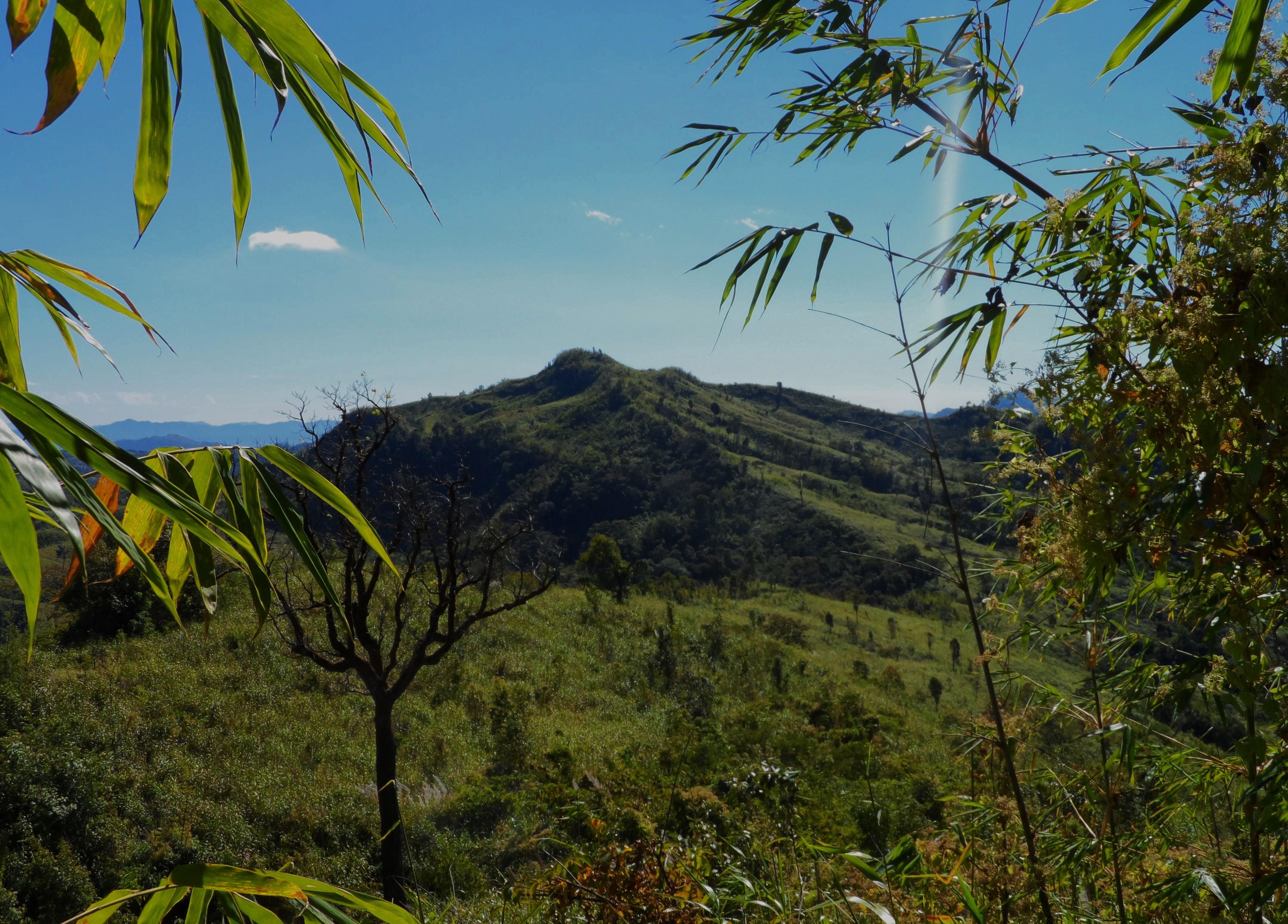
- Thingdawlte Tlang

Highest point
- Elevation: 959.8 m (3,149 ft)
- Prominence: 65 m (213 ft)
- Listing: List of mountains of Bangladesh
- Coordinates: 21°54′37″N 92°35′22″E

Geography
- Location within Bangladesh
- Location: Ruma Bandarban
- Parent range: Lowmbok Row

Geology
- Mountain type: Mountain

Thingdawlte Tlang is a mountain in Bangladesh. It is the highest point of the Lowmbok Row range and possibly the country's 7th tallest. In December 2012 local explorer Fahim Hasan of BD Explorer summited the peak and measured its height for the first time. The name of the peak was collected by BD Explorer and confirmed by the local residents. A few days later Zaqiul Deep of Travelers of Bangladesh measured the altitude as 3,133 feet (955 m). The easiest summit route is to start from Ruma of Bandarban District. The nearest settlement is Thingdawlte (Bawm) village, for which the peak is named.

== See also ==
- Geography of Bangladesh
- List of countries by highest point
- List of mountains of Bangladesh
