= Mukhra Thuthai haphong =

Mukhra Thuthai Haphong
- মুখরা থুতাই হাফং
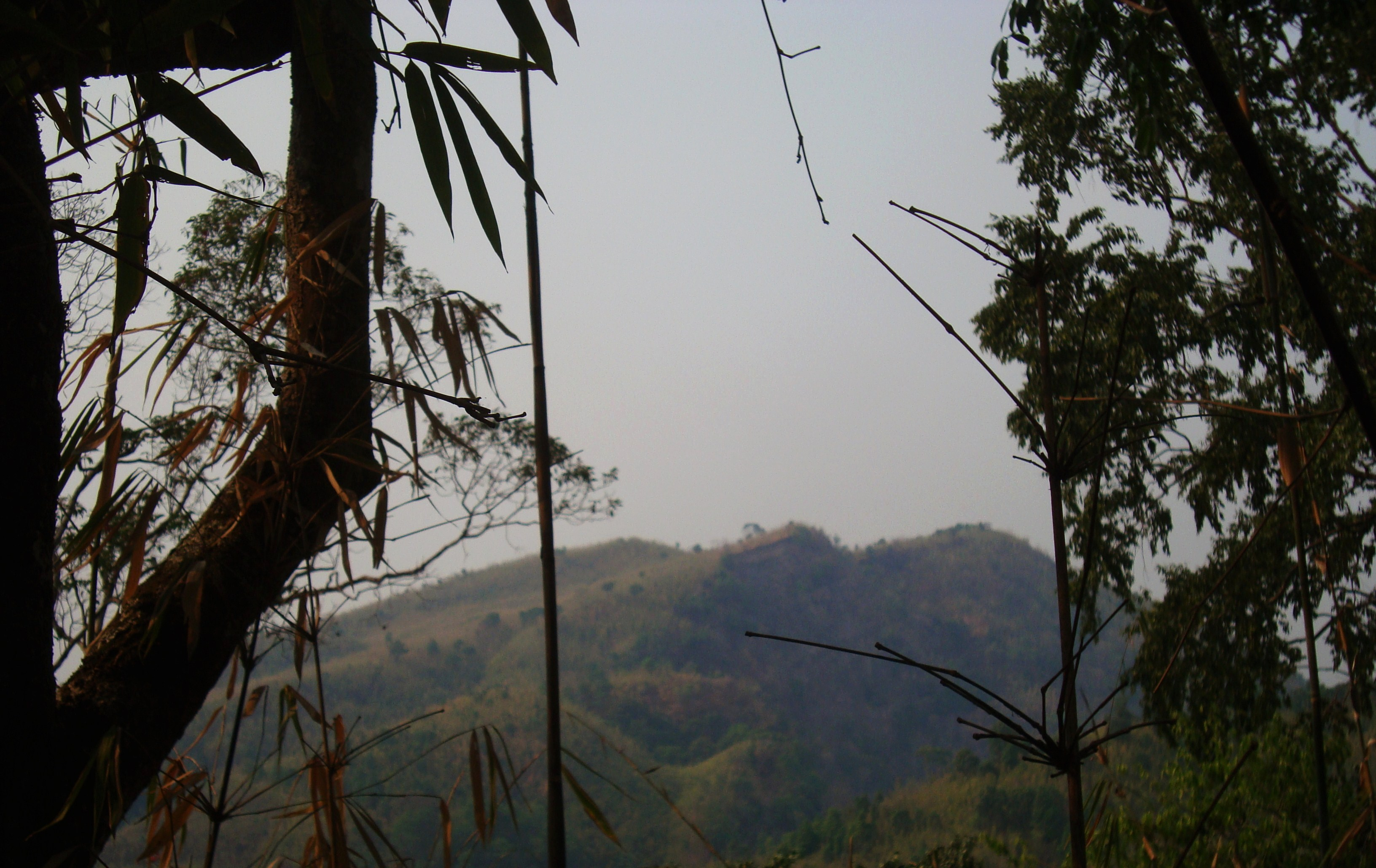
- Three peaks of Mukhra Thuthai Haphong

Highest point
- Elevation: 953.6 m (3,129 ft)
- Listing: List of mountains of Bangladesh
- Coordinates: 21°58′52″N 92°36′13″E

Geography
- Location within Bangladesh
- Location: Belaichori Rangamati
- Parent range: Reng Tlang

Geology
- Mountain type: Mountain

Mukhra Thuthai Haphong is a significant border peak of Bangladesh situated in the southern part of Belaichori of Rangamati Hill District. In April 2013, Fahim Hasan of BD Explorer summitted and measured this peak for the first time. The peak's elevation was measured at 953.6 metres (3,129 ft). The name of the peak was collected by BD Explorer and confirmed by the local tribal people of Dhupanichora village. The name Mukhra Thuthai Haphong came from the Tripura language. The nearest settlement is known as Dhupanichora para. The easiest route to summit this peak is to start from Ruma of Bandarban district.

== See also ==
- Geography of Bangladesh
- List of countries by highest point
- List of mountains of Bangladesh
