= Zow Tlang =

Mountain on the Bangladesh–Myanmar border

Zow Tlang / Reang Haphong
- Reang Hills
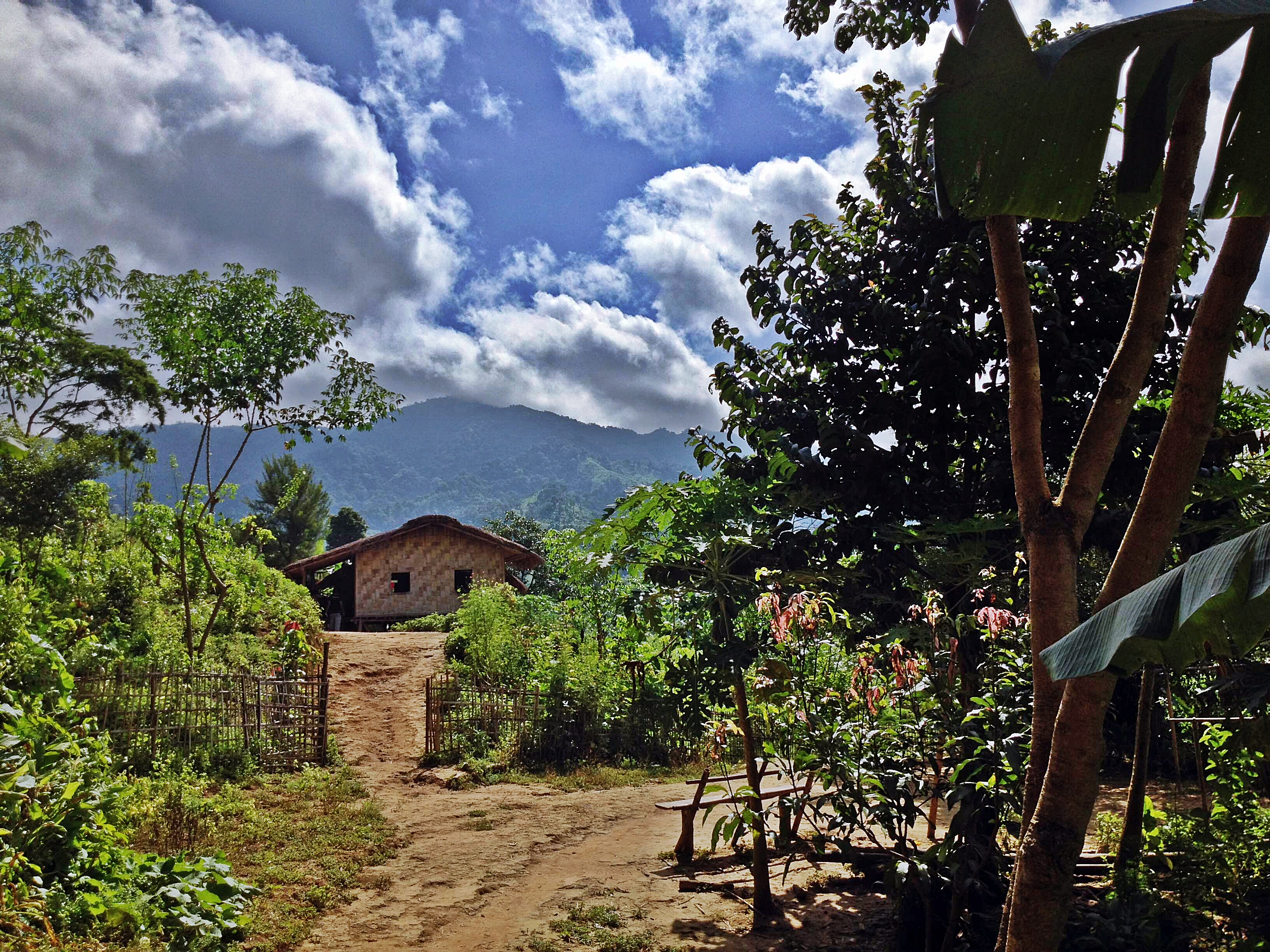
- View of Zow Tlang from the nearest village, Dowlian Para.

Highest point
- Elevation: 1,021.69 m (3,352.0 ft)
- Listing: List of mountains of Bangladesh
- Coordinates: 21°40′23.76″N 92°36′16.03″E

Geography
- Location within Bangladesh Location within Myanmar
- Location: Bangladesh–Myanmar border
- Parent range: Mowdok Range

Zow Tlang or Reang Haphong is a mountain on the Bangladesh–Myanmar border. Height of the mountain is equal to 1,022 m.

== Etymology ==
In the Bawm language, "Zow" means Mizo, a term derived from Mizoram, India. This is probably due to the fact that Bangladesh was a part of greater India before 1947. "Tlang" means mountain. According to American and Russian topographic maps Zow Tlang is mentioned as "Mowdok Mual" . As per Bangla Trek, it is the second highest peak of the country; though it is not officially recognized by the government. Many local adventurers describe this as one of the wildest peaks of Bangladesh.

The peak was first summited in 2005 by Bangladeshi adventurers Subrata Das Nitish and Bijoy Shankar Kar. The same team repeated the feat in 2007. The altitude could not be measured in these two expeditions as the team was not carrying a GPS device. On January 12, 2012, the peak was summited for the third time by Bangla Trek team members Tashdid Rezwan Mugdho, Tarikul Alom Sujon, Salehin Arshady and S.M. Mainul. They precisely measured altitude and location. Two of the team members, Mugdho and Sujon died in a bus crash on their return to Bandarban. The other two members, Salehin and Mainul suffered serious injuries.

On October 13, 2013, a team led by Shahzaman Chowdhury Hira became the third team to summit the peak. This team had six members - Sharfaraj Hussain Jony, Sidratul Afia Mohona, Mahbubur Rahman, Abdullah Anas Oni and Baqui Billah Milon. One member of this team was the first woman to summit this peak. Several other teams summited thereafter.

== See also ==
- Geography of Bangladesh
- Geography of Burma
- List of countries by highest point
- List of mountains of Bangladesh
- List of mountains in Burma
