= Dumlong =

Dumlong /Msha Panji Haphong
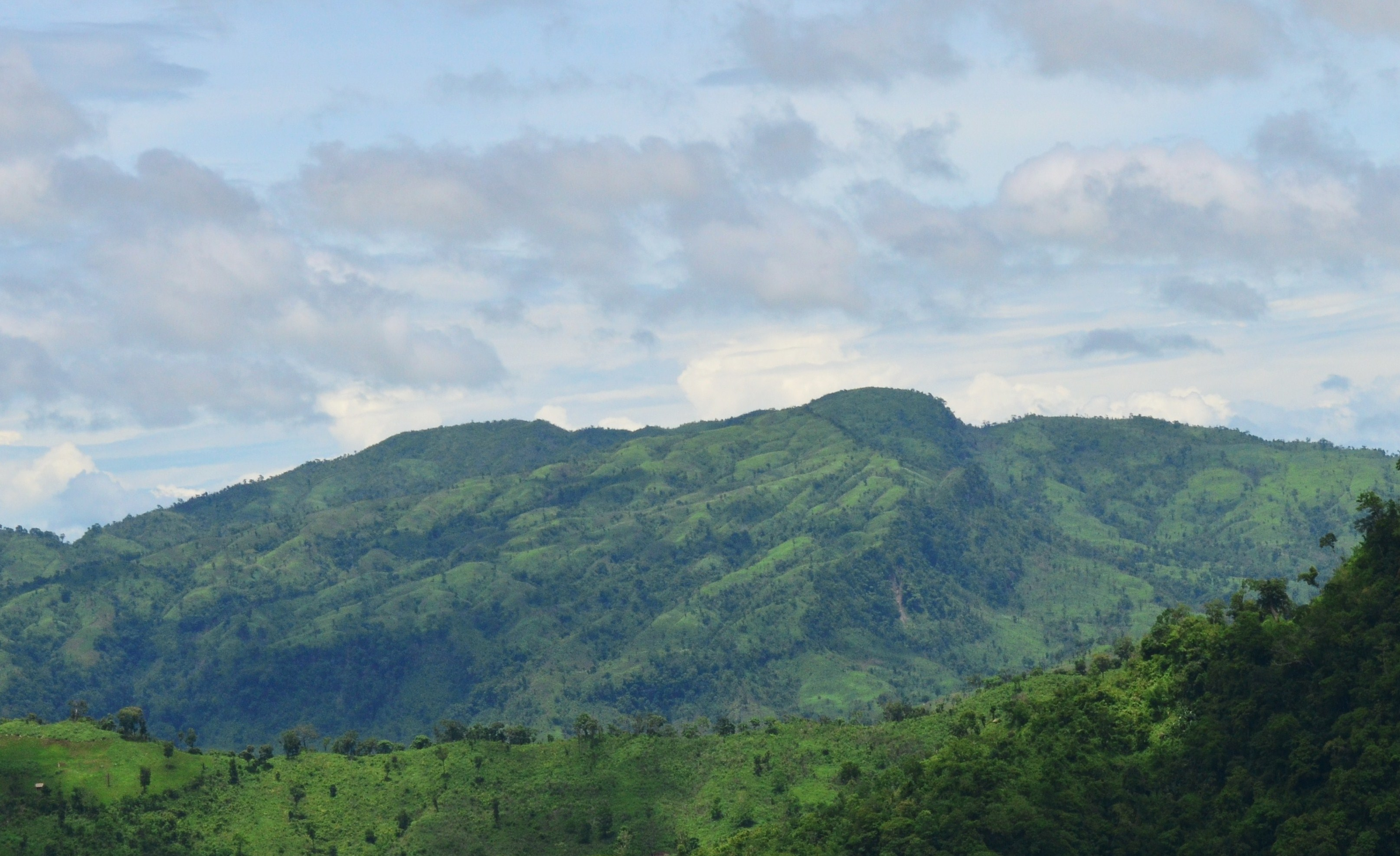
- Dumlong

Highest point
- Elevation: 1,010 m (3,310 ft)
- Listing: List of mountains of Bangladesh
- Coordinates: 22°02′29″N 92°35′02″E

Geography
- Location within Bangladesh
- Location: Belaichori, Rangamati
- Parent range: Rang Tlang

Geology
- Mountain type: Mountain

Dumlong or Msha Panji Haphong mountain in Belaichori, Rangamati, Bangladesh may be the second highest mountain in the country, as claimed by Wadud Mohosin Rubel, Asif Aminur Rashid, Nagib Meshkat & Abdul Haq of the Nature Adventure Club in 2011. On the basis of Garmin GPS they have measured the height of the mountain which is 3314 feet. The location he recorded, 22°02′02.1″N 92°35′36.3″E, accurately matches the location given by Google Earth.

A few months after his expedition, the Travelers of Bangladesh team led by Zaqiul Deep measured this peak as 3,312 feet. After that Fahim Hasan of BD Explorer reached the summit of Dumlong as a 3rd team. There is little doubt about the height of Dumlong peak but whether it is 2nd or 3rd highest peak in the country, is not confirmed yet. It is the highest peak of Rangamati hill district and also the one of three 1000 metres peaks in Bangladesh.

Long time ago over the rocks of Mount Dumlong was built a fortress which was the capital of Dumlong Dynasty.

== See also ==
- List of mountains of Bangladesh
