= Saka Haphong =

Mountain peak in Bangladesh

- Mayung Hills, Saka Haphong Tlang
- Location within Bangladesh Location within Myanmar

Highest point
- Elevation: 1,063 m (3,488 ft)
- Prominence: 820 m (2,690 ft)
- Listing: Country high point; Mountains of Bangladesh
- Coordinates: 21°47′19″N 92°36′31″E

Naming
- Native name: সাকা হাফং (Bengali); ဆကးအဖောင် တောင် (Burmese)

Geography
- Location: Bangladesh–Myanmar border
- Countries: Bangladesh and Myanmar

Saka Haphong (Bengali: সাকা হাফং; Burmese: ဆကးအဖောင် တောင်) (also known as Modowk Taung (Bengali: মোদক টং), Tlang Moy or Sopno Chura), is a peak in Southeast Asia and South Asia. It is located on the Bangladesh–Myanmar border and is the highest peak of Bangladesh, with an elevation of 1,063 metres (3,488 ft).

== See also ==
- Geography of Bangladesh
- Geography of Myanmar
- List of elevation extremes by country
