= Bangladesh Climate Change Resilience Fund =

Multi-donor trust fund

The Bangladesh Climate Change Resilience Fund (BCCRF) is a multi-donor trust fund (MDTF) created to collect and disburse climate adaptation funding for Bangladesh.

On February 15, 2009, the Bangladeshi government refused to accept a £60 million climate funding offer from the United Kingdom at if it was channeled through the World Bank, at first, then the government has accepted the terms and the money.

== Scope ==
According to Mohammed Shamsuddoha and Rezaul Karim Chowdhury, "The 'draft concept note' prepared by the government of Bangladesh on the MDTF suggested that the secretariat be based in the World Bank office in Dhaka. The bank would co-chair the management committee and administer, manage, supervise, and monitor implementation of the MDTF's projects and programmes. For this job, the bank will charge a fee of $8 million. All implementing agencies will have to follow the bank's guidelines and policies on project implementation and procurement."

== Support ==
The British Department for International Development (DFID) has been insisting that climate finance should be channeled through a Multi Donor Trust Fund managed by the World Bank; this position has been supported by the Danish government.

At the 2009 Copenhagen climate conference, a Bangladeshi delegate told reporters that Bangladesh might let the World Bank manage the funds, if that was set as a condition by funders. After the conference, Bangladeshi Prime Minister Sheikh Hasina stated that establishing a Multi Donor Trust Fund is part of her government's response to climate change.

== Criticism ==
According to the New Age, the Multi Donor Trust Fund has "more or less unanimous opposition among climate change researchers, environment ministry officials, and NGOs and civil society members in Bangladesh alike." Bangladeshi civil society organizations are strongly critical of the Multi Donor Trust Fund idea, generally preferring that funds be managed by a state-run board. Campaigners have expressed concern about the 10–15% management fees to be charged by World Bank consultants and the lack of democratic access to adaptation funding. Other campaigners are strongly critical of World Bank-funded projects, which they say "have often created ecological hazards and destroyed ecological goods and services."

Bangladeshi opponents of a World Bank-managed MDTF include the Equity and Justice Working Group Bangladesh (EquityBD).

British opponents include the Jubilee Debt Coalition and the World Development Movement.
