= List of mountains of Bangladesh =

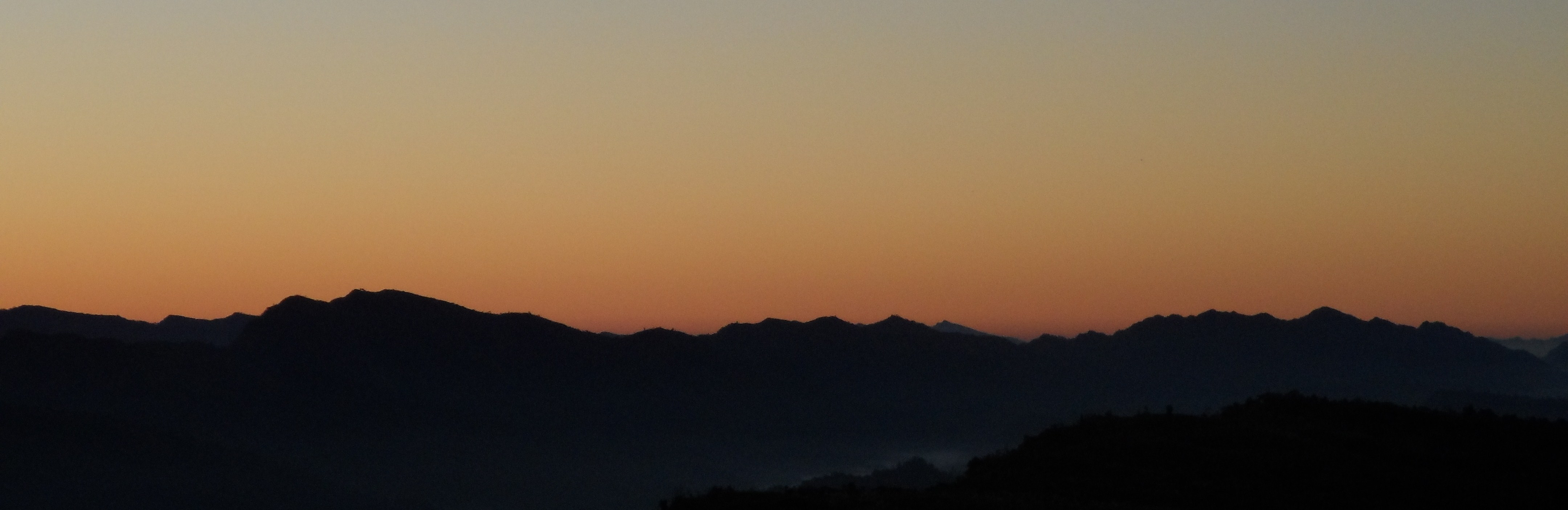
The Mowdok mountain range in Chittagong Hills

Bangladesh is primarily a low-lying country. The main areas of elevation are the Chittagong Hills in the southeast. The Chittagong Hills, which are the only significant hill system in the country, contain at least seventy-five mountain peaks, which range in altitude approximately from 600 to 1,000 m (2,000 to 3,300 ft) above sea level. The highest point in the Chittagongs and Bangladesh is at 1,063 metres (3,488 ft) at Saka Haphong in the Mowdok mountain range.

== Saka Haphong ==
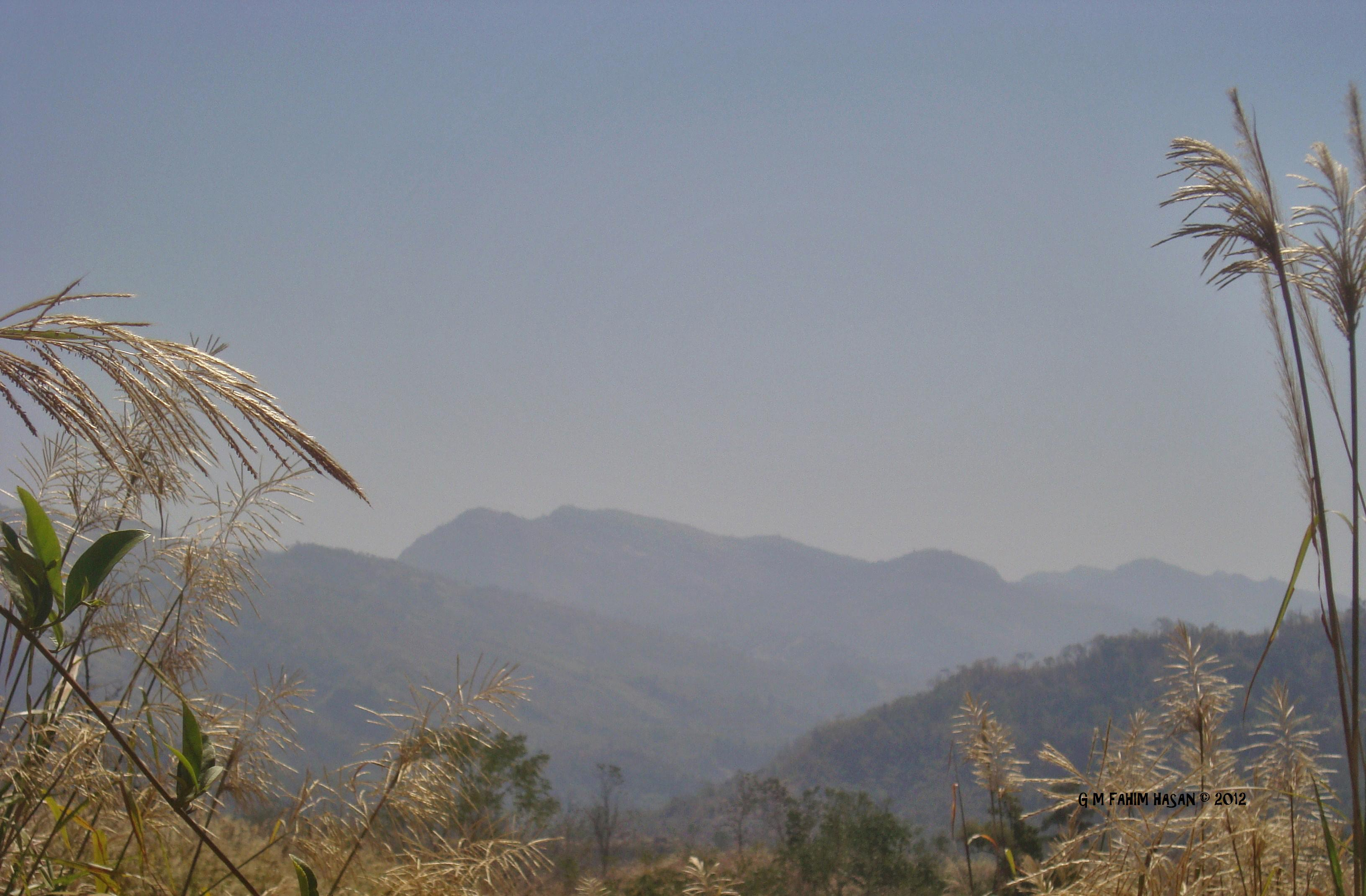
Saka Haphong

Saka Haphong is the Tripura tribal name which is the highest peak of Chittagong and Bangladesh. The peak is at an altitude of 1,064 meters (3,491 feet) and located at 21°47′19″N 92°36′31″E in the Mowdok mountain range on the border with Myanmar.

== Zow Tlang/ Reang Haphong ==
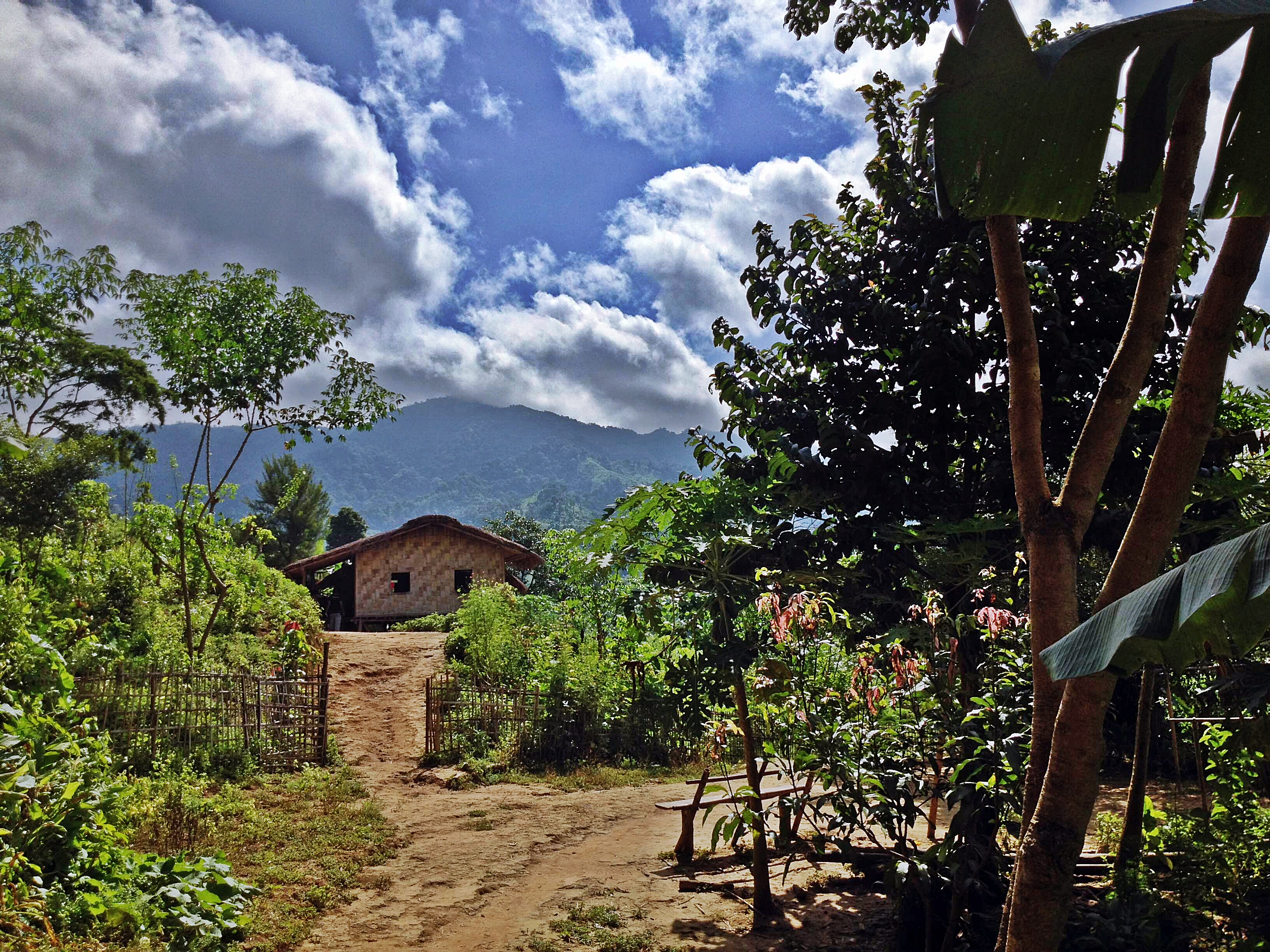
Zow Tlang seen from the nearest village, Dowlian Para

Zow Tlang or Reang Haphong is a peak in the Mowdok range located at 21°40′23″N 92°36′16″E on the border with Myanmar. Its peak is at an altitude of 1,022 metres (3,353 ft). According to Bangla Trek, it is the second-highest peak in the country, though it has not yet been officially recognized by Bangladesh's government.

The local name comes from the Bawm language. The name 'Zow' refers to 'Mizo', a derivative of Mizoram in India. 'Tlang' means mountain in the Bwam language. The official name, 'Mowdok Mual', comes from American and Russian topographic maps.

== Dumlong/ Msha Panji Haphong ==
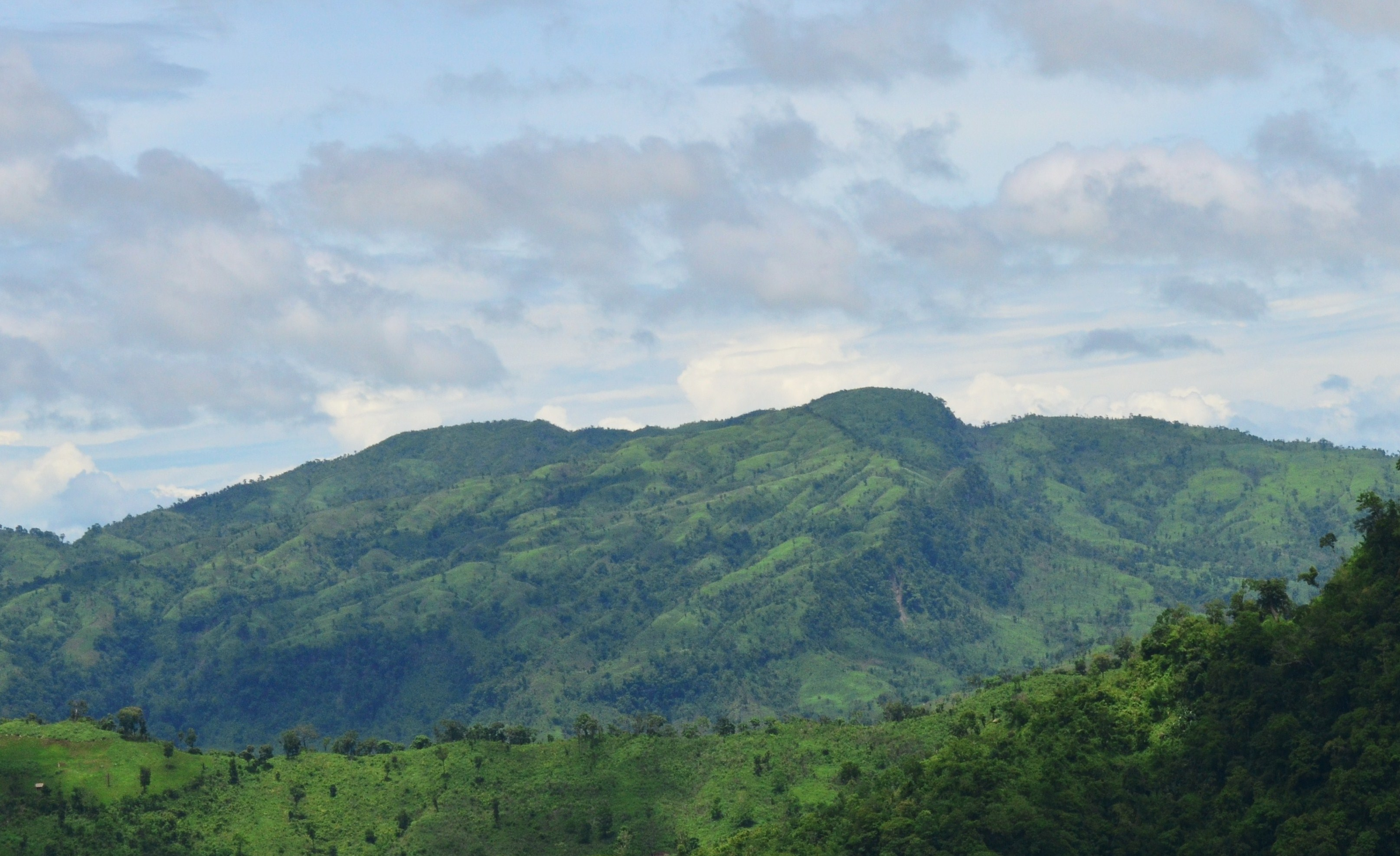
Dumlong

In 2011, Wadud Mohosin Rubel alongside his three travel partners Asif Aminur Rashid, Nagib Meshkat and Abdul Haque have claimed the mountain, 'Dumlong/Msha Panji Haphong' to be the second highest mountain in Bangladesh on the basis of measurements made by their Garmin GPS. The height was found at 3,314 ft. (1,010 m). The location was recorded as 22°02′02.1″N 92°35′36.3″E, accurately matching the coordinates given by Google Earth.

A few months after this expedition, a team of Bangladeshi travelers led by Zaqiul Deep measured the height at 3,312 ft. (1,009 m). A third team also reached the summit later led by Fahim Hasan of BD Explorer. There is no doubt about the height of Dumlong but whether it is the second or third highest mountain in the country is yet to be confirmed. Nevertheless, it is indeed the highest peak of Rangamati Hill District and one of only three mountains measured at more than a thousand metres in height.

In 2014, several teams climbed the summit of Zow Tlang, and based on their readings, they surmised Dumlong is the third-highest mountain in Bangladesh.

== Keokradong ==
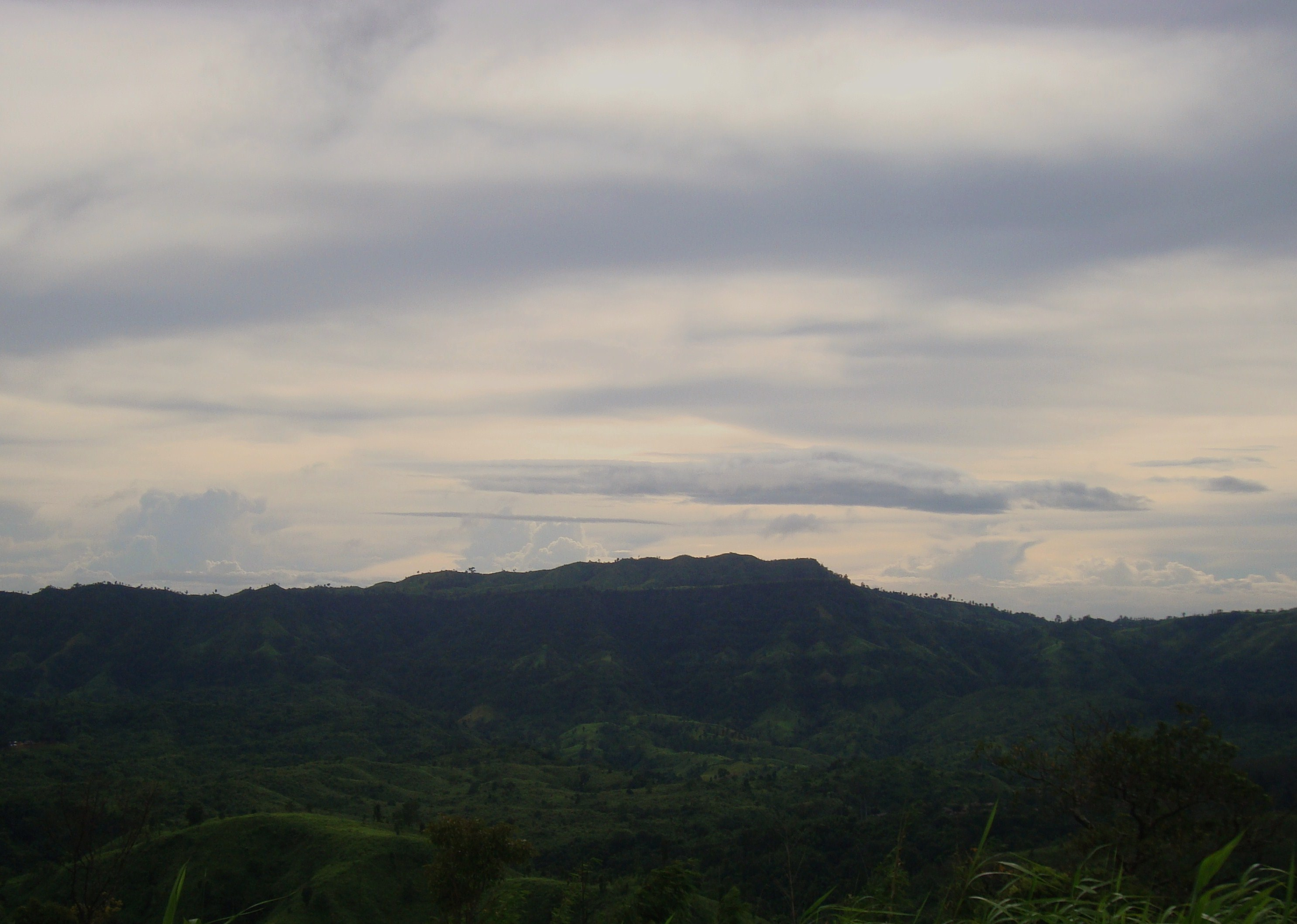
Eastern face of Keokradong

Although sometimes incorrectly known as the highest point in Bangladesh at 1,230 metres (4,040 ft), recent SRTM data, GPS readings and Russian topographic mapping show that its true height is far less.

On the top of Keokradong there is a small shelter and a signboard put up by the Bangladeshi military proclaiming the altitude to be 967 m (3,173 ft). Garmin GPS recorded 974 m (3,196 ft) at this location, a different team measured 986 m (3,235 ft) with 3 m (9.8 ft) accuracy by GPS, a measurement consistent with Russian topographic mapping and SRTM data. It is at 21°57′00″N 92°30′53″E. USGS and Russian mapping dispute the claim that this is the location correctly named Keokradong; they show Keokradong at an 883 m (2,897 ft) summit further north.

== Maithaijama Haphong ==
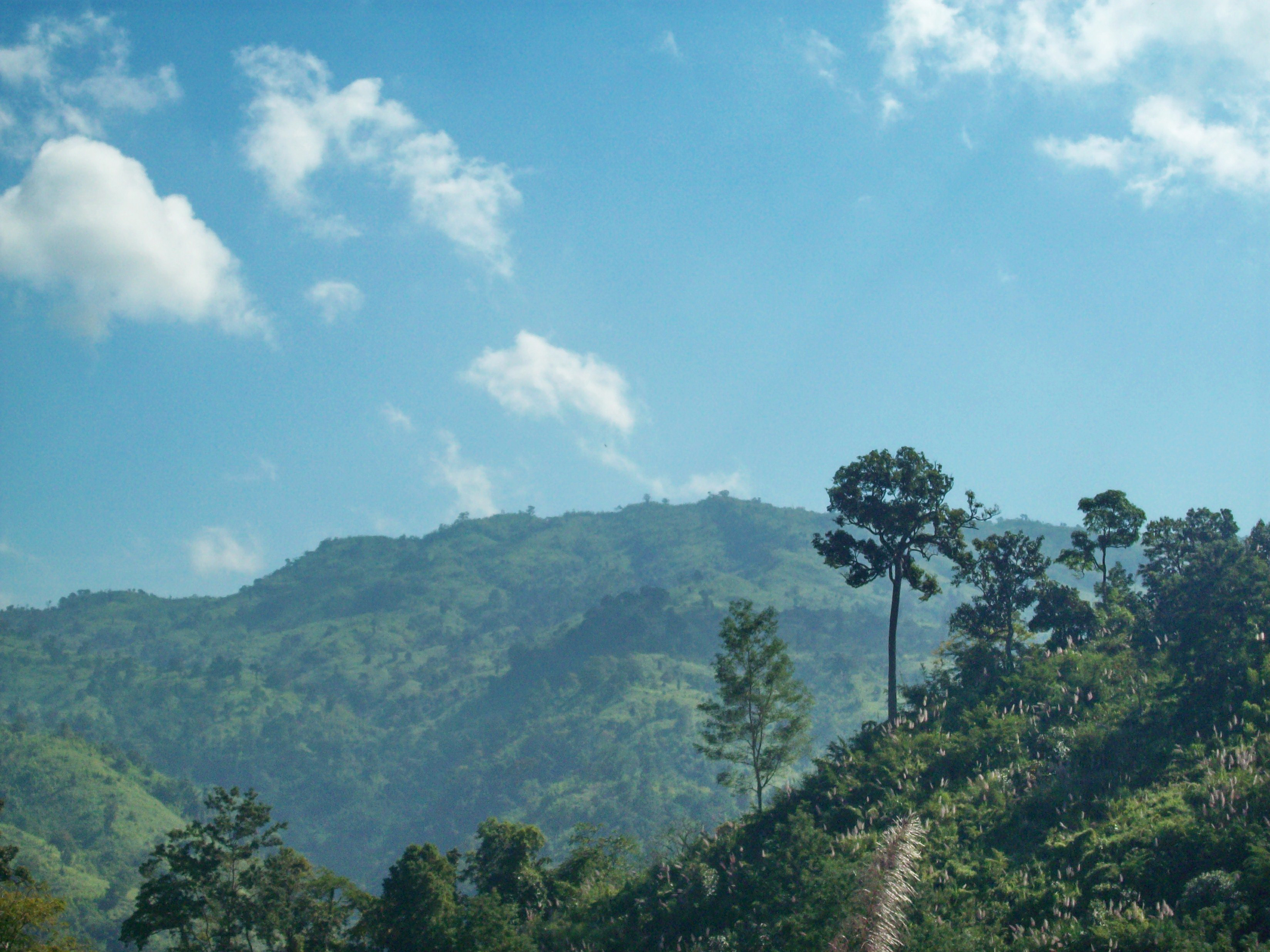
View of Maithaijama Haphong from Pukur Para trail

Located at the south-eastern part of Chittagong hill tracts between the Bangladesh and India border, Maithaijama Haphong is the sixth-highest peak of Bangladesh. However it is not officially recognized according to the Bangladesh government. This peak is also the second-highest peak of Reng Tlang range after Dumlong. On 7 December 2014 Fahim Hasan from Dhaka, a member of an adventure team BD Explorer with the help of the local villagers summitted the peak of Maithai Jama Haphong and measured this height as 967 m (3,173 ft) by the Garmin GPS device for the very first time. Exact Geo location of the highest point was N 22°00.714', E 92°35.863'. The name "Maithai Jama Haphong" came from the Tripura language. which means, "Bad hilly place for vegetation." Stream (Jhiri) route to summit & view from the peak is extraordinary.

- Location: Bilaichori, Rangamati.
- Range: Reng Tlang
- Elevation: 3,174 ft (967 m) (GPS accuracy: 2 m +/-)
- Position: N 22°00.714', E 92°35.863'
- Measured by: BD Explorer

== Thingdawlte Tlang ==
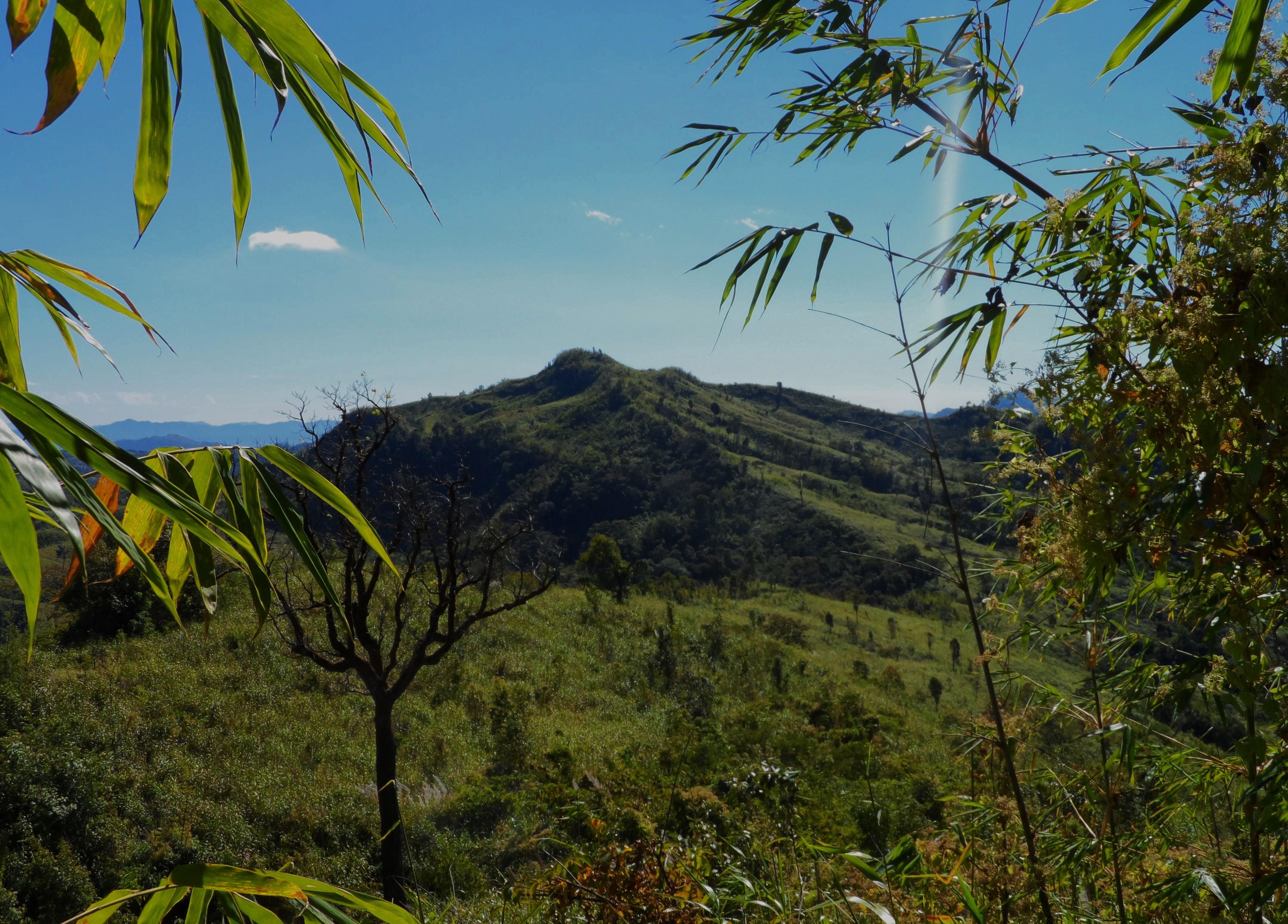
Thingdawl Te Tlang

Thingdawlte Tlang is a significant peak of Bangladesh. This peak is the highest point of 'lawmbok Row' range and possible seventh-highest of the country. In December 2012 a local explorer Fahim Hasan of "BD Explorer" summitted the peak of Thingdawlte Tlang and measured the height for the first time, which is 3,149 ft (960 m). GPS accuracy was 3 m (9.8 ft) (+/-). The name of the peak was collected by BD Explorer and confirmed by the local tribal people of Thingdawlte village. Few days later Zaqiul Deep of "Travelers Of Bangladesh" measured this peak as 3,133 ft (955 m). The easiest route to summit this peak is to start from Ruma of Bandarban district. Nearest settlement is known as Thingdawlte (Bawm) village. This peak is named after this village.

- Location: Ruma, Bandarban
- Range: Lawmbok row
- Elevation: 3,149 ft (960 m) (GPS accuracy 3m +/-) [Possible seventh-highest peak of Bangladesh and highest point of lowmbok Row range]
- Geo position: N 21°54.611', E 092°35.380′ (21.910182, 92.589654)
- Measured by: BD Explorer

== Mukhra Thuthai Haphong ==
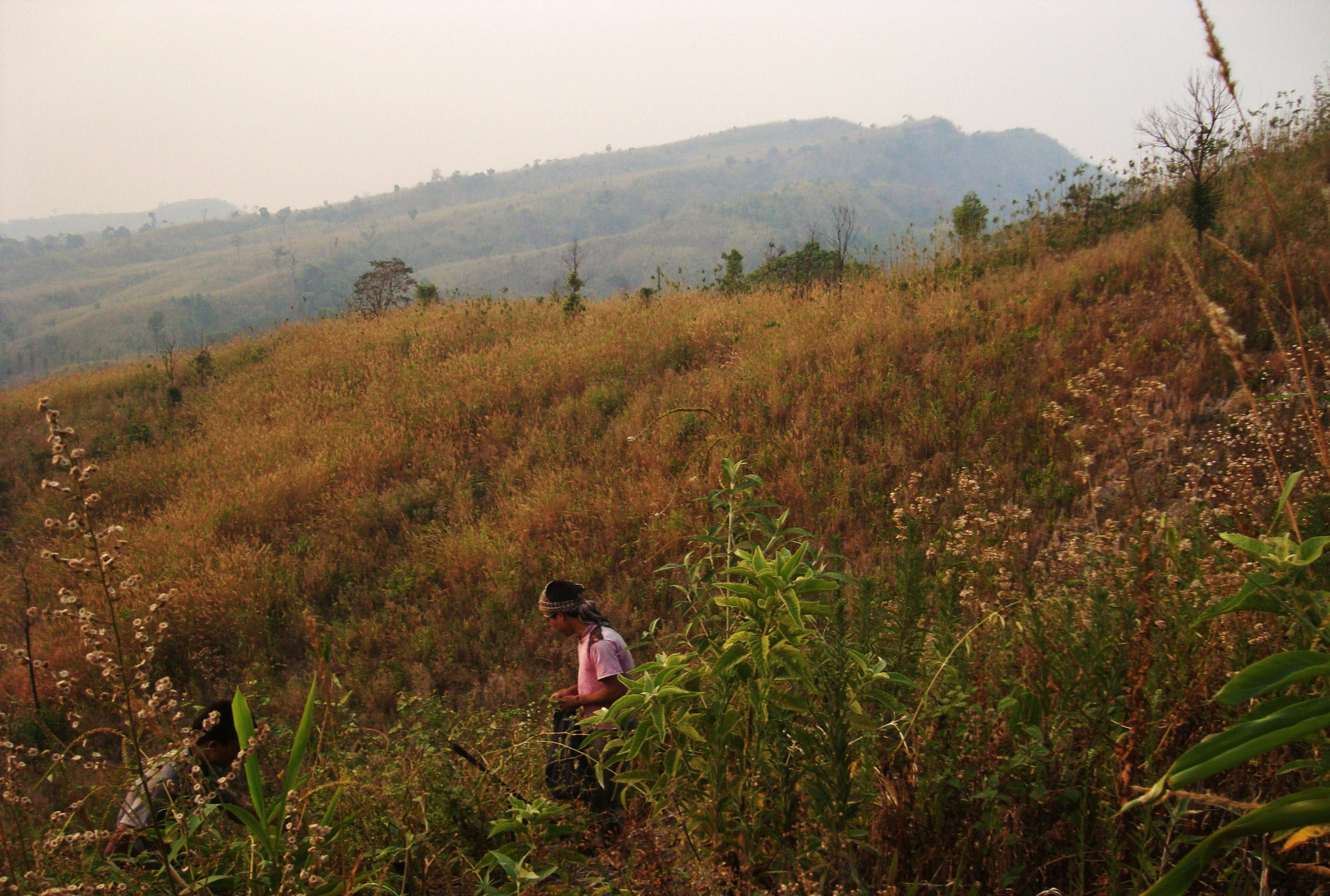
Mukhra Thuthai Haphong

Mukhra Thuthai Haphong is a significant border peak of Bangladesh, situated at the southernmost part of Belaichori of Rangamati Hill District. In April 2013, Fahim Hasan of BD Explorer summited and measured this peak for the first time. Highest elevation measured at 953.6 m (3,129 ft). The name of the peak was collected by BD Explorer and confirmed by the local tribal people of local village. The name Mukhra Thuthai Haphong came from the Tripura language. Nearest settlement is known as Dhupanichora para. The easiest route to summit this peak is to start from Ruma of Bandarban district.

- Location: Belaichori, Rangamati
- Range: Reng Tlang
- Elevation: 3,129 ft (954 m) (GPS accuracy: 2 m (6 ft 7 in) (+/-)
- Position: N 21°58'51.87", E 92°36'12.88"
- Measured by: BD Explorer

== Kapital Haphong ==
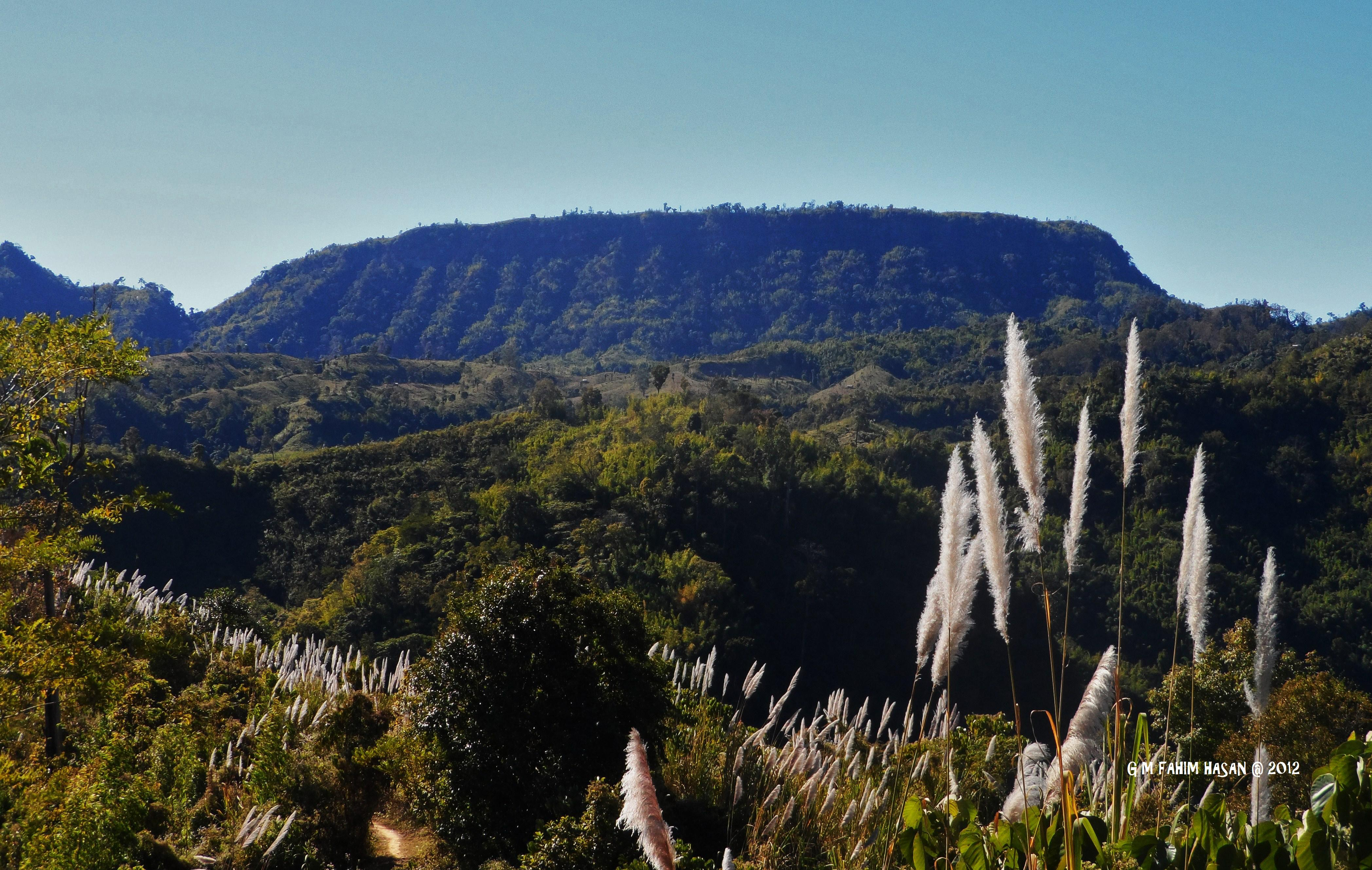
Kapital

Kapital/Capital is a peak on the Politai range near Thaikeng para. This flat mountain top was once used as a hideout by a separatist group from Mizoram. They declared this mountaintop as their temporary capital of free and independent Mizoram, later moving to another location. The locals nevertheless still call this area the 'Kapital'.

- Location: Ruma, Bandarban
- Range: Politai range
- Elevation: 3,094 ft (943 m)
- Geo position: N 21°54'2.58", E 92°31'26.68"

== Kreikung Taung ==
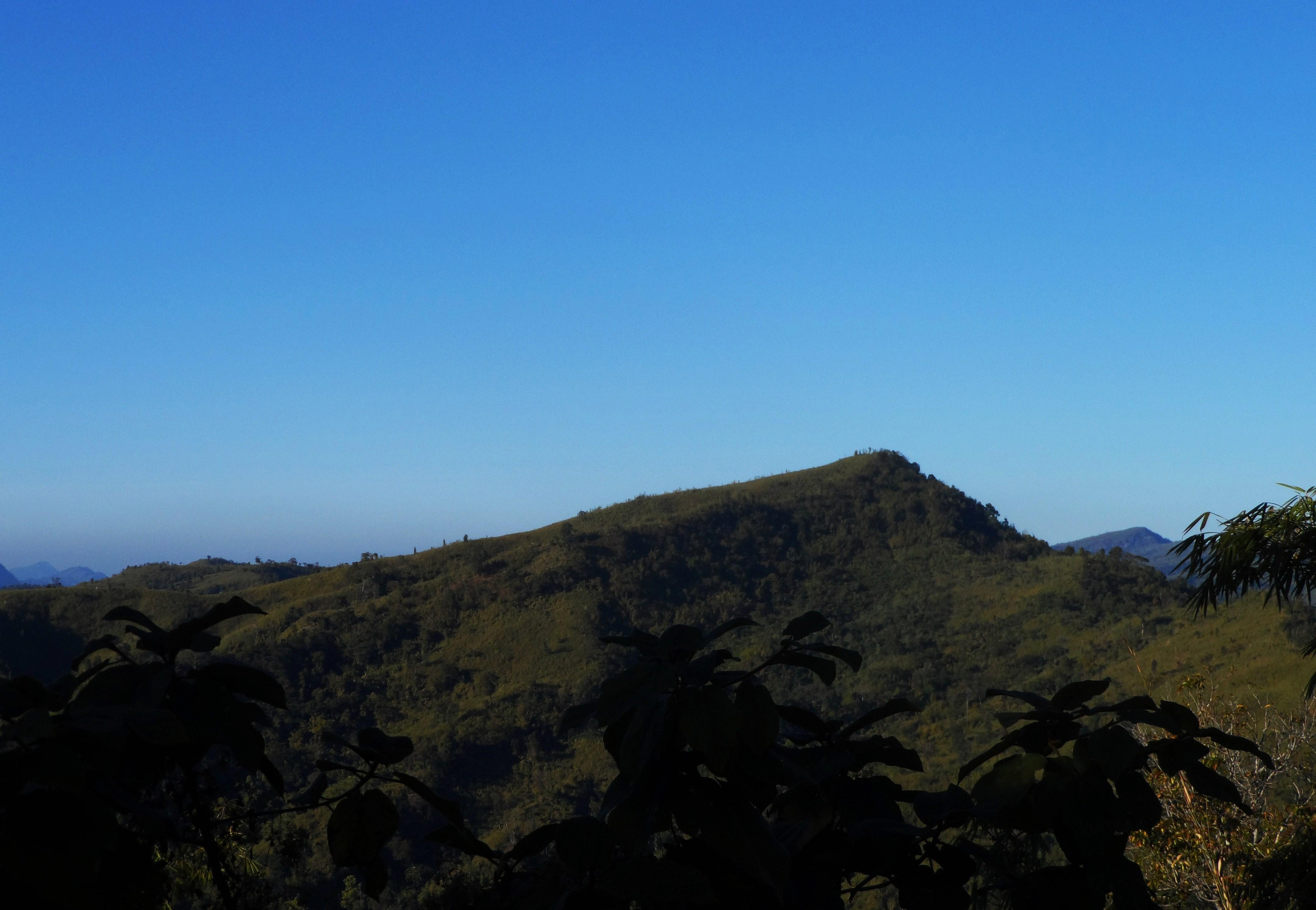
Kreikung

Kreikung Taung is a significant peak of Bangladesh. This peak is the second highest point of 'Lawmbok Row' range and possibly the eleventh-highest in the country. In December 2012, a local explorer Fahim Hasan of "BD Explorer" summitted the peak of Kreikung Taung and measured the height for the first time at 3,083 ft (940 m). GPS accuracy was 2 m (6 ft 7 in) (+/-). The name of the peak was collected by BD Explorer and confirmed by the local tribal people of Thingdawlte village. The easiest route to summit this peak is to start from Ruma of Bandarban district. Nearest settlement is known as Thingdawlte (Bawm) village.

- Alternative name: Ngaramh Tlang (ন্যারা্ম্ ত্ল্যাং,বম); Kreikung Taung name originated from local Marma language.
- Bengali meaning: মাছ পাহাড়
- Location: Ruma, Bandarban
- Range: Lawmbok row
- Elevation: 3,083 ft (940 m) (GPS accuracy 2m +/-) [2nd-highest peak of Lowmbok row range]
- Geo location: N 21°55.563', E 092°34.827′
- Measured by: BD Explorer

== Sippi Ar-suang ==
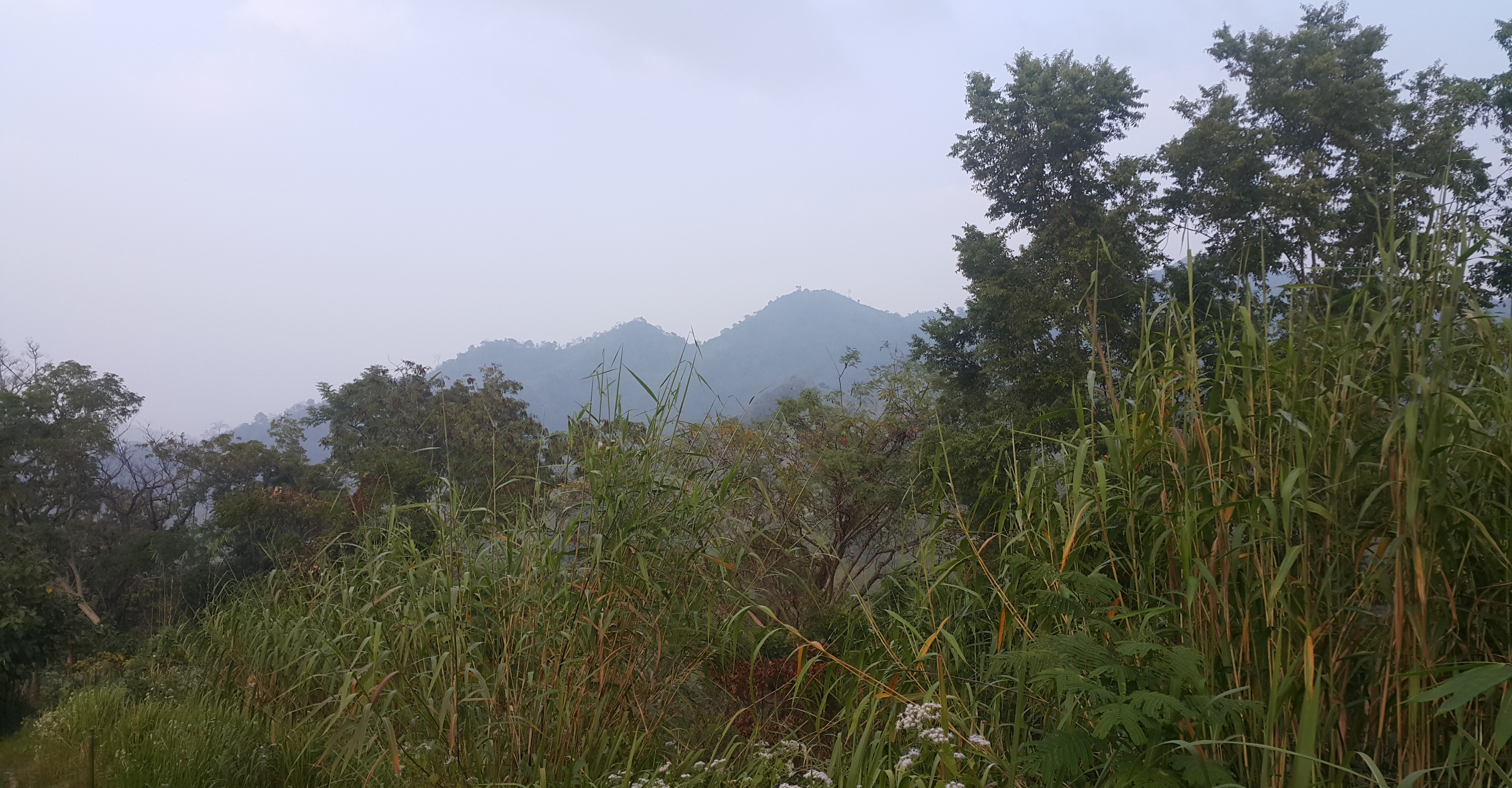
A view from Ronin Para (Fiangpidung Para) on the way to Sippi Arsuang

Sippi Arsuang is located at N 22°11′03.43″ E 92°29′01.57″ with a height of 896 m (2,940 ft) (15 m (49 ft) accuracy). In US Army 1:250k topo map this peak is shown as Ramju Taung with a height of 3,016 ft (919 m) and in Russian 1:200k topo map it is shown as 917 m (3,009 ft).

== Taung Prai ==
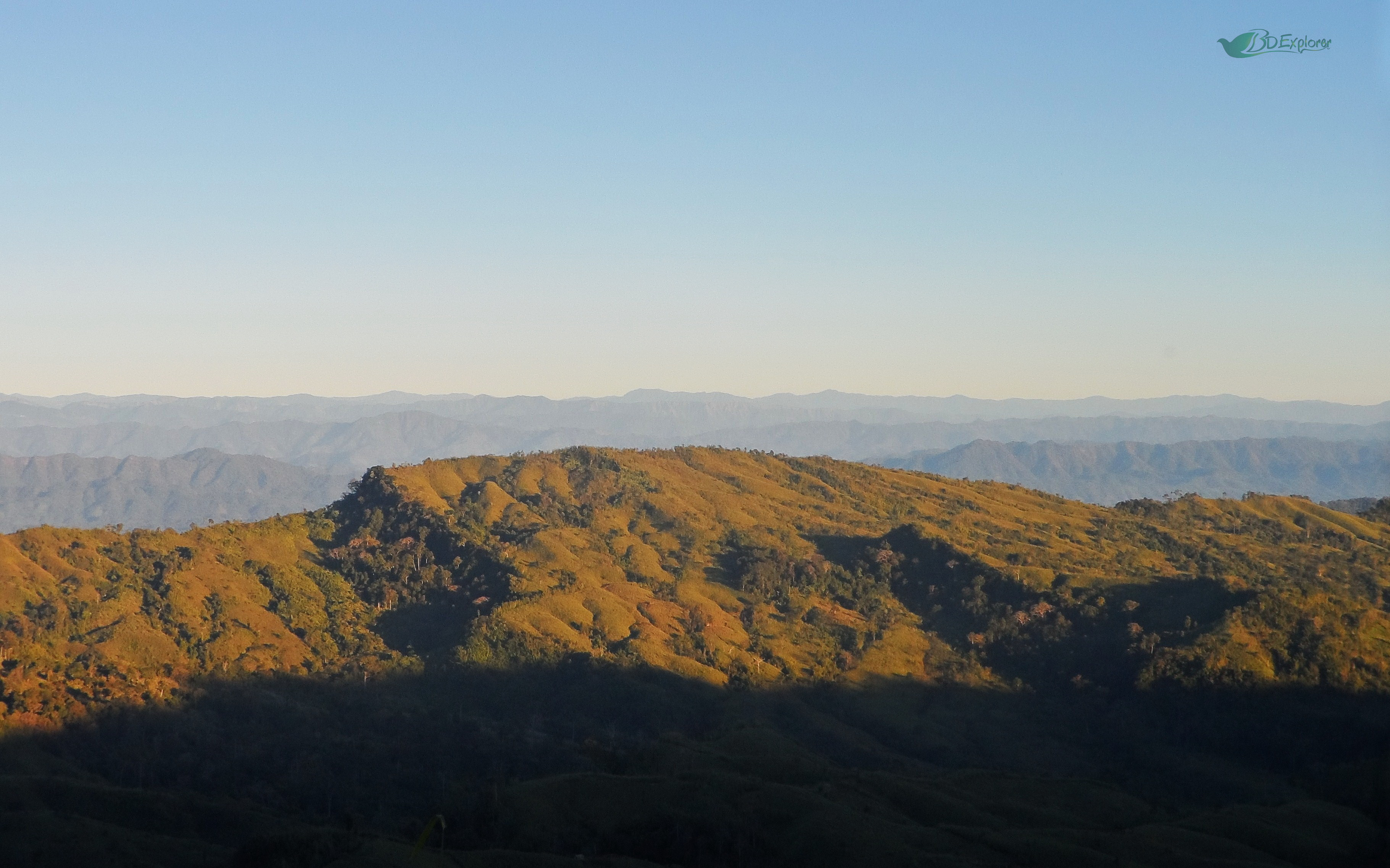
Taung Prai

Taung Prai, a dome-shaped mountain at Reng Tlang border range, is the most south-eastern border peak of Rangamati district. It is also the last major peak at Reng Tlang range inside the Bangladesh border. The view seen from the top is mind-blowing. Taung prai is a Marma word which means "Ulta pahar"(উল্টা পাহাড়). In 2013, 6 November, Fahim Hasan along with Saki Khan from Dhaka, members of local adventure group BD Explorer, summited the peak of Taung Prai and measured the peak as 2,959 ft (902 m) by a Garmin GPS device for the first time.

- Location: Belaichori, Rangamati
- Range: Reng Tlang
- Elevation:2,959 ft (902 m) (GPS accuracy 3m+/-)
- Nearest village: Kes Pai (Khumi)
- Geo position: 21° 54.176'N 92° 37.611'E
- Measured by: BD Explorer

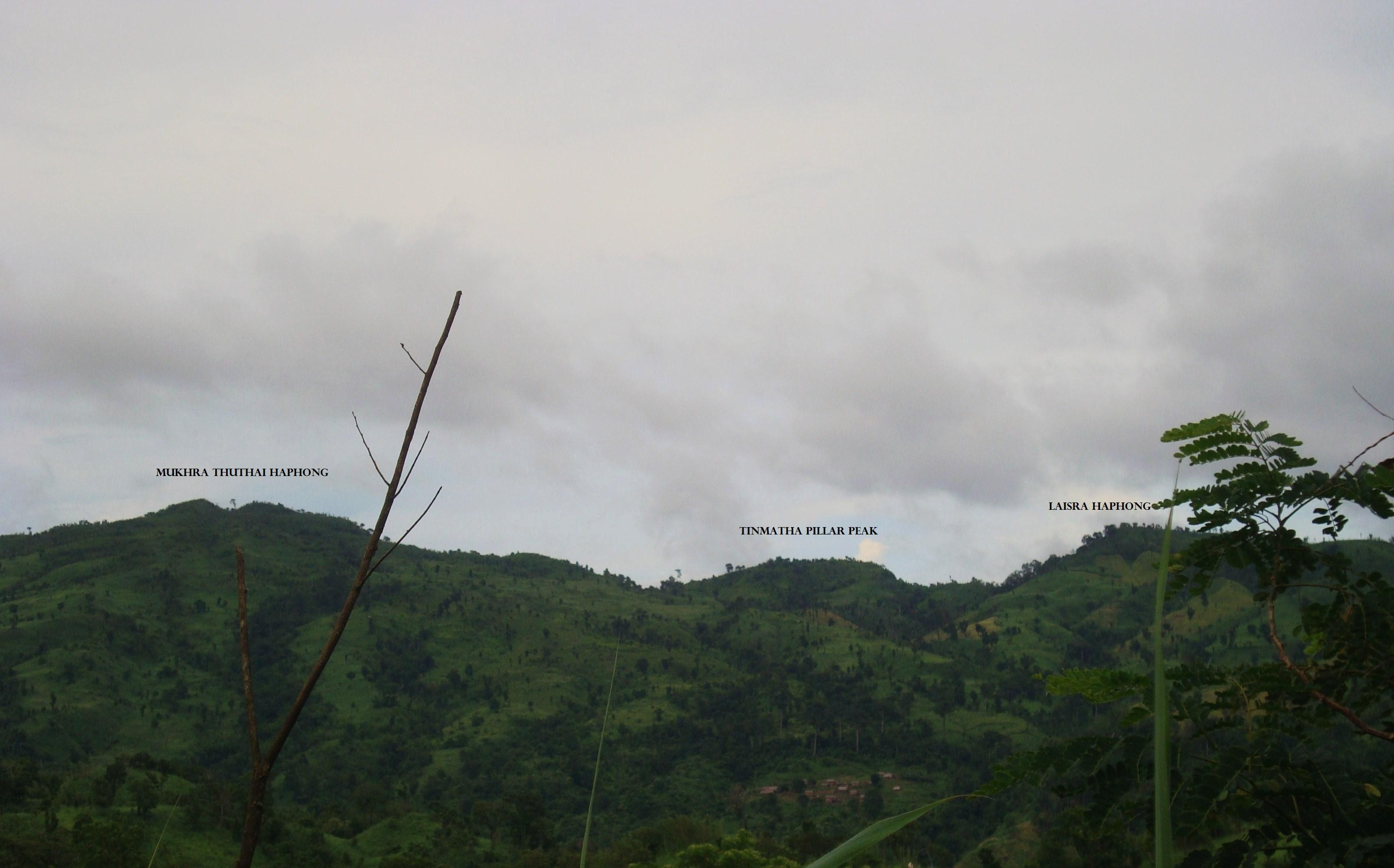
Tinmatha pillar peak in between Mukhra Thuthai and Laisra Haphong

Tinmukh/Tinmatha pillar is a significant border pillar that marks the meeting point of three countries's borders; Bangladesh, Myanmar and India, located above a peak in between "Mukhra Thuthai Haphong" and "Laisra Haphong".

- Location: Belaichori, Rangamati
- Range: Reng Tlang
- Elevation: 2,912 ft (888 m) (GPS accuracy 2m +/-)
- Geo position: N21 58.474 E92 36.440

== Tazing Dong ==
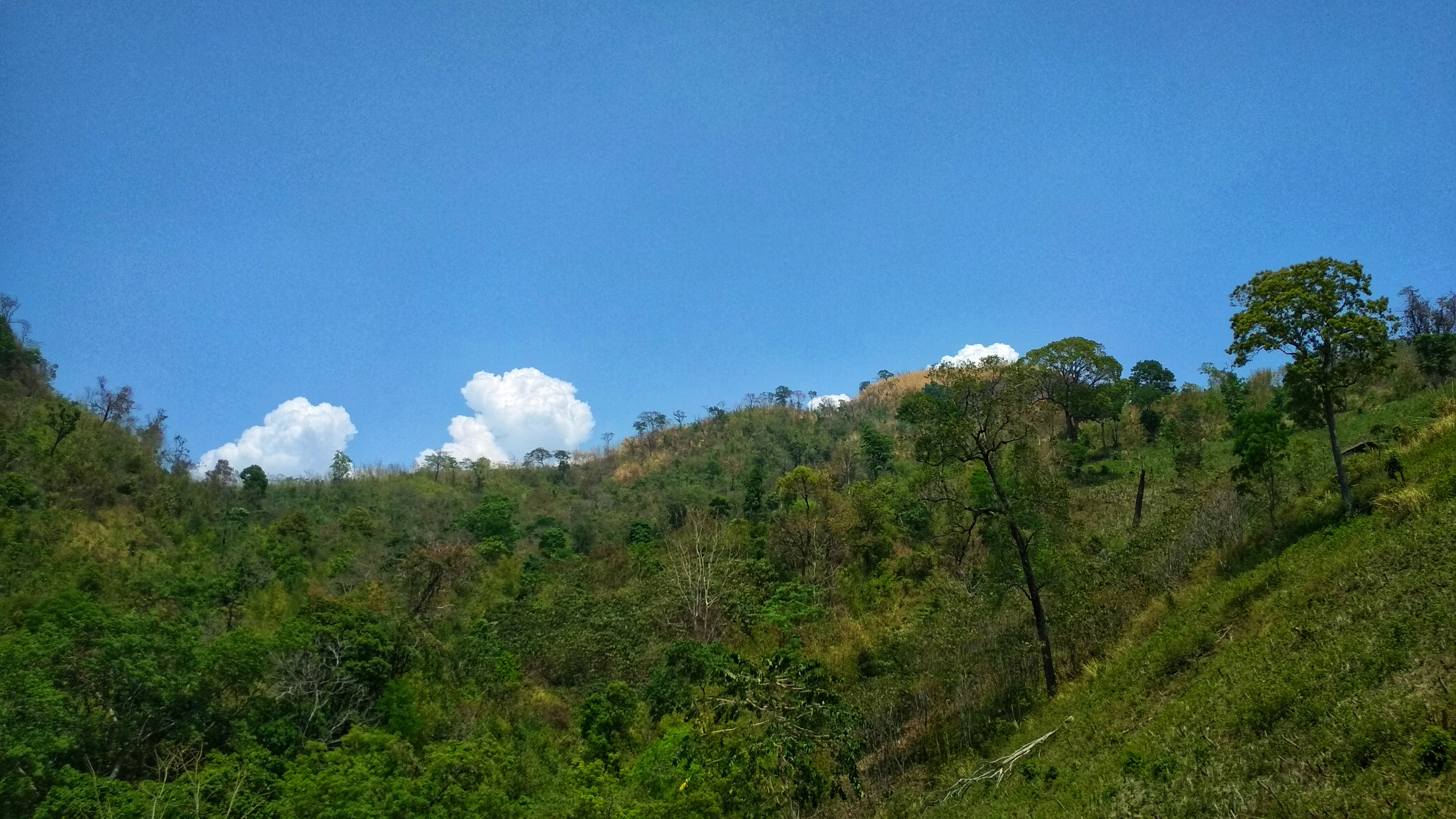
Tazing Dong peak

Another peak that is sometimes incorrectly claimed to be the peak of Bangladesh is Tazing Dong (sometimes spelled as Tahjingdong, and also known as Bijoy). It has incorrectly been claimed to be 1,280 m (4,200 ft), however neither Russian topographic mapping nor SRTM data show anything in the area exceeding 1,000 m (3,300 ft).

There are three peaks in that area known as Thajindong (Lungphe Taung in US army 1:250K topo map and Russian 1:200k topo map). A local trekker team measured the highest two peaks and found the middle one (N 21° 49' 16.20" - E 92° 32' 11.61") is 871 m (2,858 ft)(3 m (9.8 ft) accuracy), and higher than the other peak which was at N 21° 48' 58.17" - E 92° 31' 49.87" with 829m (accuracy 3m) measured height. A different measurement done by another team using Garmin GPS shows the height of the other peak as 829.66m with 3m accuracy.

== List of peaks above 3,000 ft (910 m) ==
Rank	Peak Name	Elevation	Location	Notes
1	Saka Haphong	3,465 ft (1056.132 meters)	Thanchi, Bandarban	Unofficially the highest peak of Bangladesh.; 1st summit by English adventurer Ginge Fullen in 2006.
2	Zow Tlang	3,353 ft (1,022 m)	Thanchi, Bandarban	This peak was first summitted in 2005 by two Bangladeshi adventurers, Subrata Das Nitish and Bijoy Shankar Kar.
3	Dumlong	3,314 ft (1,010 m)	Belaichori, Rangamati	Highest peak in Rangamati.; Elevation measured during the summit expedition by Nature Adventure Club in 2011.
4	Aiyang Tlang	3,298 ft (1,005 m)	Thanchi, Bandarban	Elevation measured using GPS in November, 2019
5	Jogi Haphong	3,251 ft (991 m)	Thanchi, Bandarban	1st summited in 2012.
6	Keokradong	3,235 ft (986 m)	Ruma, Bandarban	Most popular trekking route in Bangladesh.
7	Maithai jama Haphong	3,174 ft (967 m)	Belaichori, Rangamati	Elevation measured during the summit expedition by BD Explorer in 2014.
8	Thingdawl Te Tlang	3,149 ft (960 m)	Ruma, Bandarban	Highest peak of Lowmbok row range.; Elevation measured during the summit expedition by BD Explorer in 2012.
9	Mukhra Thuthai haphong	3,129 ft (954 m)	Belaichori, Rangamati	Elevation measured during the summit expedition by BD Explorer in 2013.
10	Haja chora Haphong	3,105 ft (946 m)	Thanchi, Bandarban	Elevation measured during the survey expedition'14-15 by 'D'-Way Expeditors.
11	Kopital	3,094 ft (943 m)	Ruma, Bandarban	This flat mountain top once used as a hide out place by separatist group from Mizoram.
12	Kreikung Taung/Ngaramh Tlang	3,083 ft (940 m)	Ruma, Bandarban	Elevation measured during the summit expedition by BD Explorer in 2012.
13	Rang Tlang/Bortholi Pahar/Khum Haphong	measured	Belaichori, Rangamati	Elevation measured during the survey expedition'14-15 by 'D'-Way Expeditors.
14	Sippi Arsuang	3,030 ft (920 m)	Rowangchori, Bandarban	Elevation 1st measured during the summit expedition by Nature Adventure Club in 2008.
15	Nasai Hum	3,005 ft (916 m)	Thanchi, Bandarban	Most south-east corner peak of Bangladesh.; Elevation measured during the joint expedition of maran source by D-way expeditors & Nature Adventure Club in 2011.

== See also ==
- List of waterfalls in Bangladesh
