= Geography of Bangladesh =

Coordinates: 24°00′N 90°00′E

Map of Bangladesh

Bangladesh is a densely populated, low-lying, mainly riverine country located in South Asia with a coastline of 580 km (360 mi) on the northern littoral of the Bay of Bengal. The delta plain of the Ganges (Padma), Brahmaputra (Jamuna), and Meghna Rivers and their tributaries occupy 79 percent of the country. Four uplifted blocks (including the Madhupur and Barind Tracts in the centre and northwest) occupy 9 percent and steep hill ranges up to approximately 1,000 metres (3,300 ft) high occupy 12 percent in the southeast (the Chittagong Hill Tracts) and in the northeast. Straddling the Tropic of Cancer, Bangladesh has a tropical monsoon climate characterised by heavy seasonal rainfall, high temperatures, and high humidity. Natural disasters such as floods and cyclones accompanied by storm surges periodically affect the country. Most of the country is intensively farmed, with rice the main crop, grown in three seasons. Rapid urbanisation is taking place with associated industrial and commercial development. Exports of garments and shrimp plus remittances from Bangladeshis working abroad provide the country's three main sources of foreign exchange income.

== Physical geography ==
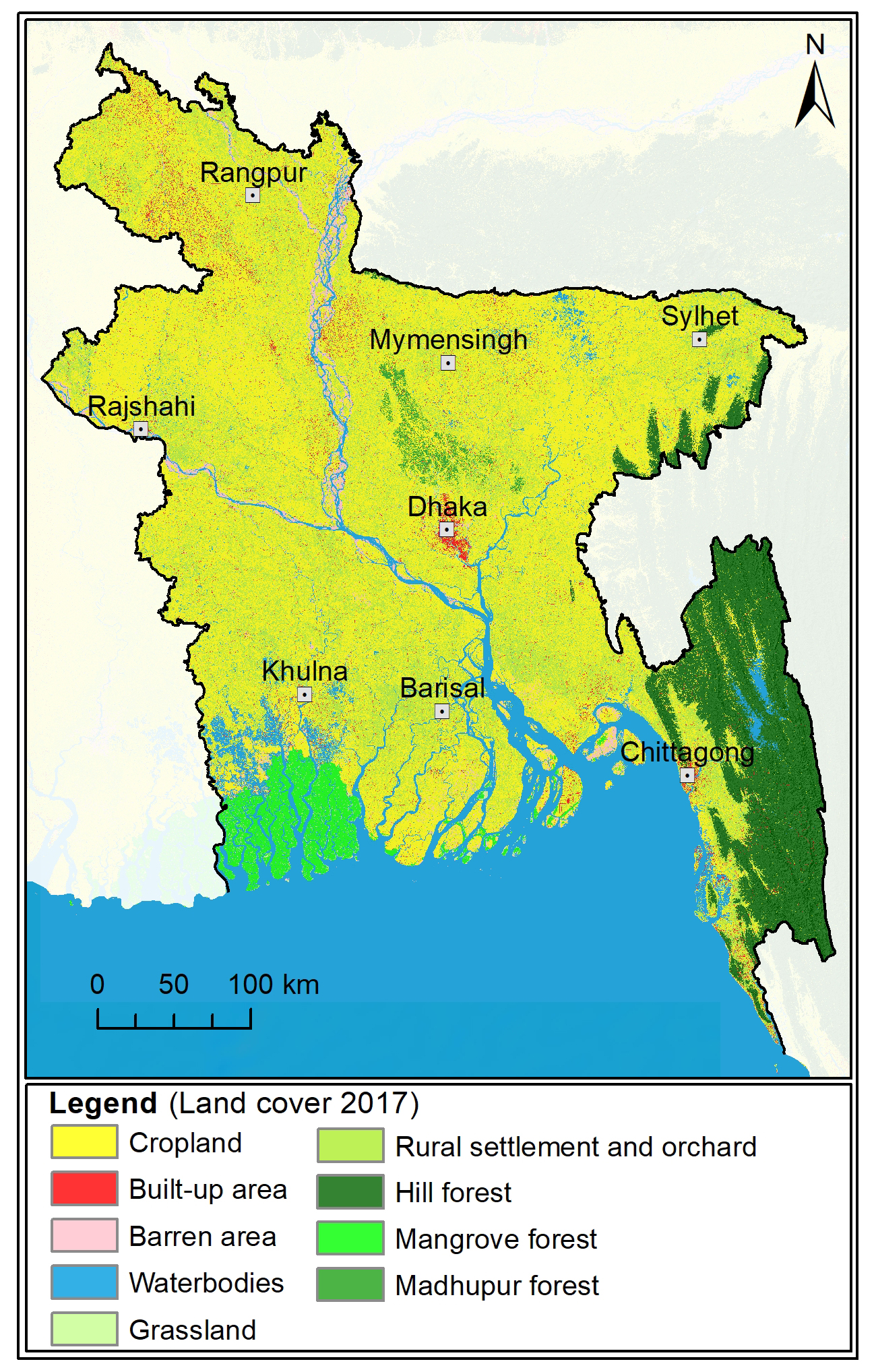
Land cover map of Bangladesh

Satellite photographs (from Terra-MODIS) and computer-generated models help visualise Bangladesh's place in the world. Located in South Asia, it is virtually surrounded by India and the Bay of Bengal to the south. But in many ways, the country's fate is dominated by the world's highest mountain range looming to the north-the Himalayas.

The physical geography of Bangladesh is varied and has an area characterised by two distinctive features: a broad deltaic plain subject to frequent flooding, and a small hilly region crossed by swiftly flowing rivers. The country has an area of 147,570 square kilometres (56,980 sq mi) (according to BBS 2020) or 148,460 square kilometres (57,320 sq mi) (according to CIA World Factbook 2021) and extends 767 kilometres (477 mi) north to south and 454 kilometres (282 mi) east to west. Bangladesh is bordered on the west, north, and east by a 4,095 kilometres (2,545 mi) land frontier with India and, in the southeast, by a short land and water frontier of 193 kilometres (120 mi) with Myanmar. On the south is a highly irregular deltaic coastline of about 580 kilometres (360 mi), fissured by many rivers and streams flowing into the Bay of Bengal. The territorial waters of Bangladesh extend 12 nautical miles (22 km), and the exclusive economic zone of the country is 200 nautical miles (370 km).

Roughly 80% of the landmass is made up of fertile alluvial lowland called the Bangladesh Plain. The plain is part of the larger Plain of Bengal, which is sometimes called the Lower Gangetic Plain. Although, altitudes up to 105 metres (344 ft) above sea level occur in the northern part of the plain, most elevations are less than 10 metres (33 ft) above sea level; elevations decrease in the coastal south, where the terrain is generally at sea level. With such low elevations and numerous rivers, water—and concomitant flooding—is a predominant physical feature. About 10,000 square kilometres (3,900 sq mi) of the total area of Bangladesh is covered with water, and larger areas are routinely flooded during the monsoon season.

The only exceptions to Bangladesh's low elevations are the Chittagong Hills in the southeast, the Low Hills of Sylhet in the northeast, highlands in the north, northwest at the Mymensingh-Tangail region and the Barendra area of Rangpur ang Rajshahi division. The Chittagong Hills constitute the only significant hill system in the country and, in effect, are the western fringe of the north–south mountain ranges of Myanmar and eastern India. The Chittagong Hills rise steeply to narrow ridgelines, generally no wider than 36 metres (118 ft), with altitudes from 600 to 900 metres (2,000 to 3,000 ft) above sea level. Saka Haphong Mountain is the highest peak in Bangladesh with an elevation of 1,052 metres (3,451 ft), located in the south-eastern part of the hills. Fertile valleys lie between the hill lines, which generally run north–south. West of the Chittagong Hills is a broad plain, cut by rivers draining into the Bay of Bengal, that rises to a final chain of low coastal hills, mostly below 200 metres (660 ft), that attain a maximum elevation.

In Bangladesh forest cover is around 14% of the total land area, equivalent to 1,883,400 hectares (ha) of forest in 2020, down from 1,920,330 hectares (ha) in 1990. In 2020, naturally regenerating forest covered 1,725,330 hectares (ha) and planted forest covered 158,070 hectares (ha). Of the naturally regenerating forest 0% was reported to be primary forest (consisting of native tree species with no clearly visible indications of human activity) and around 33% of the forest area was found within protected areas. For the year 2015, 100% of the forest area was reported to be under public ownership.

The country produces large quantities of quality timber, bamboo, and sugarcane. Bamboo grows in almost all areas, but high-quality timber grows mostly in the highland valleys. Rubber planting in the hilly regions of the country was undertaken in the 1980s, and rubber extraction had started by the end of the decade. A variety of wild animals are found in the forest areas, such as in the Sundarbans on the southwest coast, which is the home of the Royal Bengal tiger. The alluvial soils in the Bangladesh Plain are generally fertile and are enriched with heavy silt deposits carried downstream during the rainy season.

== Human geography ==
Urbanisation is proceeding rapidly, and it is estimated that only 30% of the population entering the labour force in the future will be absorbed into agriculture, although many will likely find other kinds of work in rural areas. The areas around Dhaka and Comilla are the most densely settled. The Sundarbans, an area of coastal tropical jungle in the southwest and last wild home of the Bengal tiger, and the Chittagong Hill Tracts on the south-eastern border with Myanmar and India, are the least densely populated.

== Climate ==
Bangladesh is divided between a monsoon-influenced humid subtropical climate in the northern half (north of Dhaka), and a tropical monsoon climate in the southern half which is characterized by wide seasonal variations in rainfall, high temperatures, and high humidity. Regional climatic differences in this flat country are minor, though some variations can be seen between the weather patterns of the northern and southern regions, as the piedmontal plains of the former have a humid subtropical climate. According to Bangladesh Meteorological Department, there are six seasons in Bangladesh depending on the temperature, rainfall and direction of wind: mild and cool winter from December to February, hot and sunny summer or pre-monsoon season from March to May, somewhat cooler and very wet monsoon season from June to September and pleasant, shorter and cooler autumn or post-monsoon season in October–November. In general, maximum summer temperatures range between 38 and 41 °C (100.4 and 105.8 °F). April is the hottest month in most parts of the country. January is the coolest month, when the average temperature for most of the country is 16–20 °C (61–68 °F) during the day and around 10 °C (50 °F) at night.

Winds are mostly from the north and northwest in the winter, blowing gently at 1 to 3 kilometres per hour (0.6 to 1.9 mph) in northern and central areas and 3 to 6 kilometres per hour (1.9 to 3.7 mph) near the coast. From March to May, violent thunderstorms, called northwesters by local English speakers, produce winds of up to 60 kilometres per hour (37.3 mph). During the intense storms of the early summer and late monsoon season, southerly winds of more than 160 kilometres per hour (99.4 mph) cause waves to crest as high as 6 metres (19.7 ft) in the Bay of Bengal, which brings disastrous flooding to coastal areas.

Bangladesh map of Köppen climate classification zones

Heavy rainfall is characteristic of Bangladesh, causing it to flood every year. Except for the relatively dry western region of Rajshahi, where the annual rainfall is about 1,600 mm (63.0 in), most parts of the country receive at least 2,300 mm (90.6 in) of rainfall per year. Because of its location just south of the foothills of the Himalayas, where monsoon winds turn west and northwest, the region of Sylhet in northeastern Bangladesh receives the greatest average precipitation. From 1977 to 1986, annual rainfall in that region ranged between 3,280 and 4,780 mm (129.1 and 188.2 in) per year. Average daily humidity ranged from March lows of between 55 and 81% to July highs of between 94 and 100%, based on readings taken at selected stations nationwide in 1986.

About 80% of Bangladesh's rain falls during the monsoon season. The monsoons result from the contrasts between low and high air pressure areas that result from differential heating of land and water. During the hot months of April and May, hot air rises over the Indian subcontinent, creating low-pressure areas into which rush cooler, moisture-bearing winds from the Indian Ocean. This is the southwest monsoon, commencing in June and usually lasting through September. Dividing against the Indian subcontinent, the monsoon flows in two branches, one of which strikes western India. The other travels up the Bay of Bengal and over eastern India and Bangladesh, crossing the plain to the north and northeast before being turned to the west and northwest by the foothills of the Himalayas.

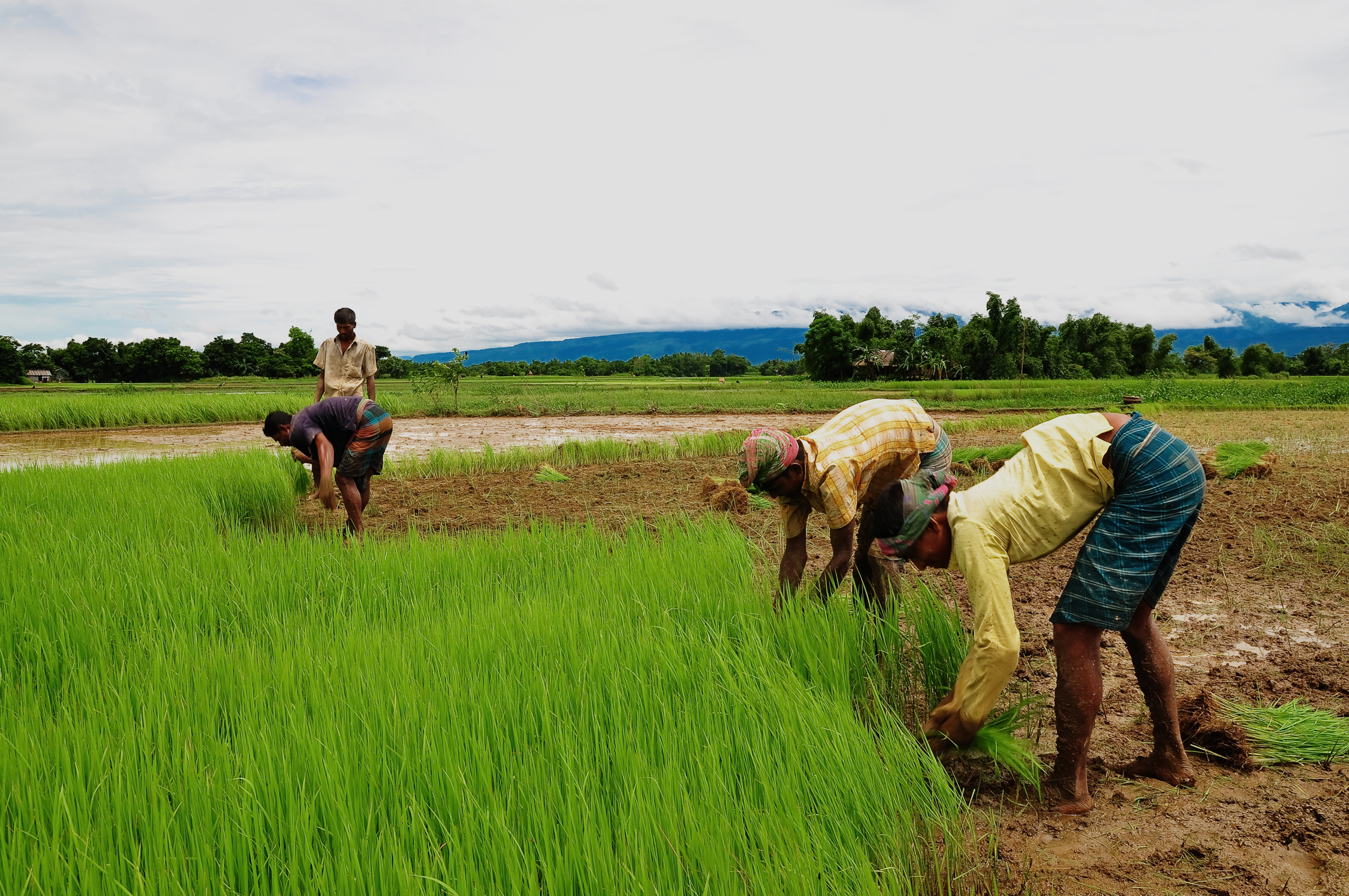
Bangladesh has a tropical climate

Natural calamities, such as floods, tropical cyclones, tornadoes, and tidal bores—destructive waves or floods caused by flood tides rushing up estuaries—ravage the country, particularly the coastal belt, almost every year. Between 1947 and 1988, 13 severe cyclones hit Bangladesh, causing enormous loss of life and property. In May 1985, for example, a severe cyclonic storm packing 154-kilometre-per-hour (95.7 mph) winds and waves 4 metres (13.1 ft) high swept into south-eastern and southern Bangladesh, killing more than 11,000 persons, damaging more than 94,000 houses, killing some 135,000 head of livestock, and damaging nearly 400 kilometres (248.5 mi) of critically needed embankments.

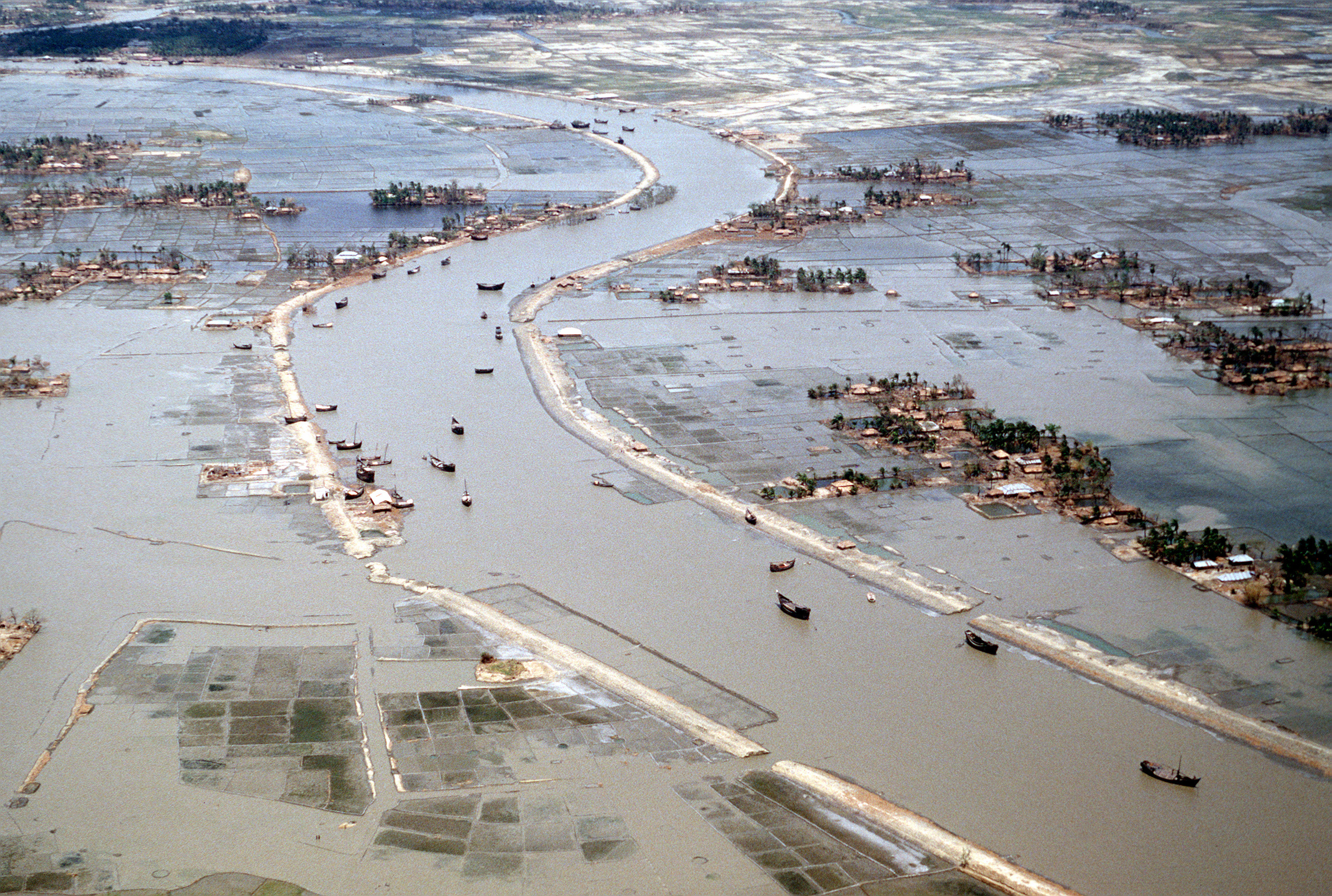
Flooding after the 1991 Bangladesh cyclone

Annual monsoon flooding results in the loss of human life, damage to property and communication systems, and a shortage of drinking water, which leads to the spread of disease. For example, in 1988, two-thirds of Bangladesh's 64 districts experienced extensive flood damage in the wake of unusually heavy rains that flooded the river systems. Millions were left homeless and without potable water. Half of Dhaka, including the runway at the Shahjalal International Airport—an important transit point for disaster relief supplies—was flooded. About 2,000,000 tonnes (2,204,623 short tons; 1,968,413 long tons) of crops were reported destroyed, and relief work was rendered even more challenging than usual because the flood made transportation exceedingly difficult. A tornado in April 1989 killed more than 600 people, possibly many more.

There are no precautions against cyclones and tidal bores except giving advance warning and providing safe public buildings where people may take shelter. Adequate infrastructure and air transport facilities that would ease the suffering of the affected people had not been established by the late 1980s. Efforts by the government under the Third Five-Year Plan (1985–90) were directed toward accurate and timely forecast capability through agrometeorology, marine meteorology, oceanography, hydrometeorology, and seismology. Necessary expert services, equipment, and training facilities were expected to be developed under the United Nations Development Programme.

Climate data for Dhaka (1981–2010)
Month	Jan	Feb	Mar	Apr	May	Jun	Jul	Aug	Sep	Oct	Nov	Dec	Year
Record high °C (°F)	31.1 (88.0)	34.4 (93.9)	40.6 (105.1)	42.2 (108.0)	41.1 (106.0)	36.7 (98.1)	35.0 (95.0)	36.1 (97.0)	36.7 (98.1)	37.4 (99.3)	34.4 (93.9)	30.6 (87.1)	42.2 (108.0)
Mean daily maximum °C (°F)	25.1 (77.2)	28.3 (82.9)	32.5 (90.5)	33.8 (92.8)	33.4 (92.1)	32.5 (90.5)	31.8 (89.2)	32.1 (89.8)	32.0 (89.6)	31.8 (89.2)	29.7 (85.5)	26.5 (79.7)	30.8 (87.4)
Daily mean °C (°F)	18.6 (65.5)	22.0 (71.6)	26.3 (79.3)	28.4 (83.1)	28.8 (83.8)	29.0 (84.2)	28.7 (83.7)	28.9 (84.0)	28.5 (83.3)	27.4 (81.3)	24.0 (75.2)	20.0 (68.0)	25.9 (78.6)
Mean daily minimum °C (°F)	13.1 (55.6)	16.2 (61.2)	20.8 (69.4)	23.8 (74.8)	24.8 (76.6)	26.2 (79.2)	26.3 (79.3)	26.4 (79.5)	25.9 (78.6)	23.9 (75.0)	19.4 (66.9)	14.8 (58.6)	21.8 (71.2)
Record low °C (°F)	6.1 (43.0)	6.7 (44.1)	10.6 (51.1)	16.7 (62.1)	14.4 (57.9)	19.4 (66.9)	21.1 (70.0)	21.7 (71.1)	21.1 (70.0)	17.2 (63.0)	11.1 (52.0)	7.2 (45.0)	6.1 (43.0)
Average rainfall mm (inches)	7.5 (0.30)	23.7 (0.93)	61.7 (2.43)	140.6 (5.54)	278.4 (10.96)	346.5 (13.64)	375.5 (14.78)	292.9 (11.53)	340.0 (13.39)	174.5 (6.87)	31.1 (1.22)	12.1 (0.48)	2,084.5 (82.07)
Average rainy days	2	3	5	10	15	14	17	16	13	7	2	1	105
Average relative humidity (%)	71	64	62	71	76	82	83	82	83	78	73	73	75
Mean monthly sunshine hours	220.3	225.3	256.3	237.8	220.9	142.2	131.5	140.6	152.7	228.6	236.3	242.6	2,435.1
Source 1: Bangladesh Meteorological Department
Source 2: Sistema de Clasificación Bioclimática Mundial (extremes 1934–1994), Deutscher Wetterdienst (sun, 1961–1990)

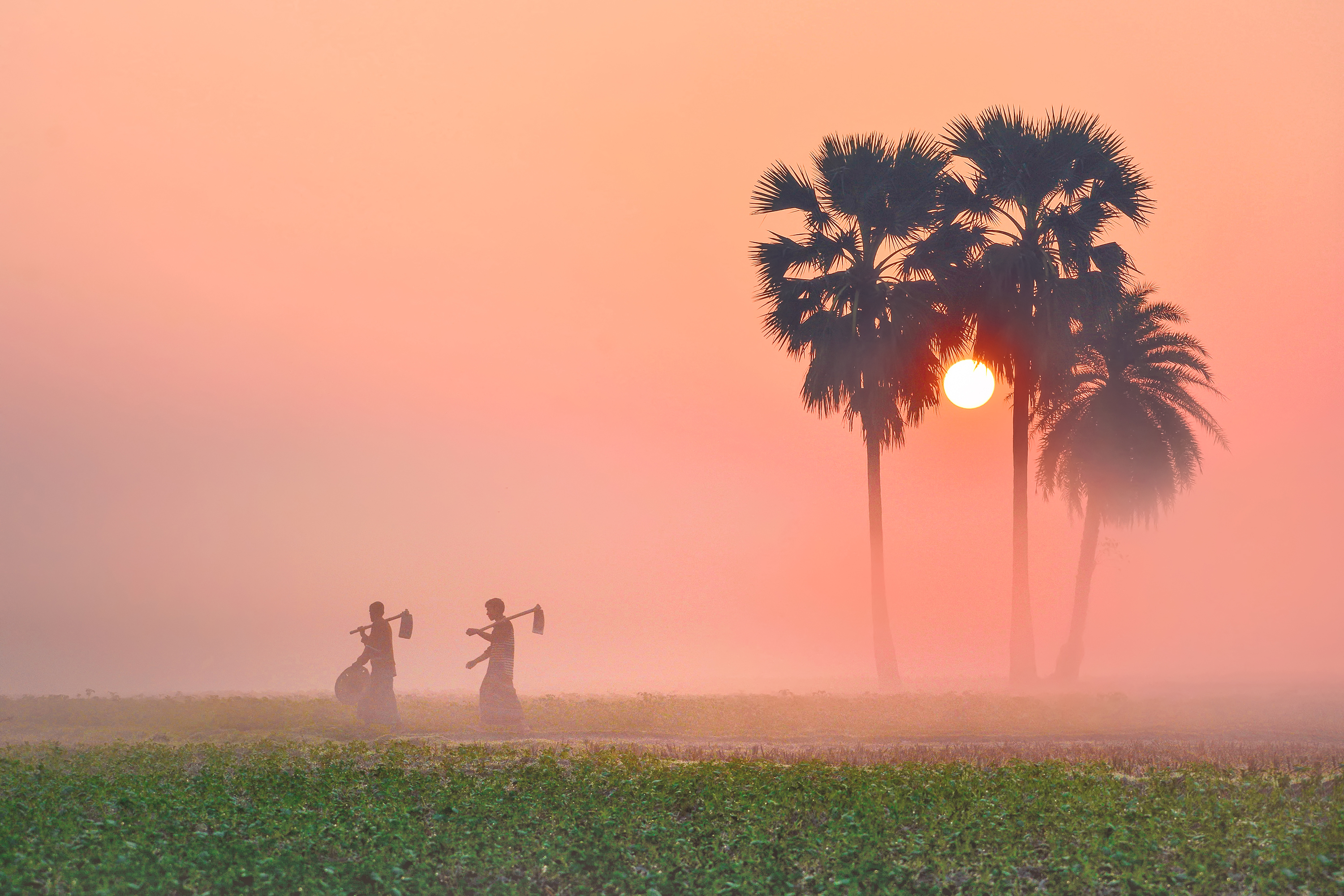
Winter morning in Bangladesh

Cold weather is unusual in Bangladesh. When temperatures decrease to 8 °C (46 °F) or less, people without warm clothing and living in inadequate homes may die from the cold.

=== Climate change ===
Climate change is a critical issue in Bangladesh. The country is one of the most vulnerable to the effects of climate change. In the 2020 edition of Germanwatch's Climate Risk Index, it ranked seventh in the list of countries most affected by climate calamities during the period 1999–2018. Bangladesh's vulnerability to the effects of climate change is due to a combination of geographical factors, such as its flat, low-lying, and delta-exposed topography and socio-economic factors, including its high population density, levels of poverty, and dependence on agriculture. The impacts and potential threats include sea level rise, temperature rise, food crisis, droughts, floods, and cyclones. Bangladesh has established a set of actions for climate mitigation and adaptation that includes reducing greenhouse gas emissions, supporting renewable energy projects, increasing forest cover, and planning response to disaster risks (p. 9).

Natural hazards that come from increased rainfall, rising sea levels, and tropical cyclones are expected to increase as the climate changes, each seriously affecting agriculture, water and food security, human health, and shelter.

Sea levels in Bangladesh are predicted to rise by up to 0.30 metres by 2050, resulting in the displacement of 0.9 million people, and by up to 0.74 metres by 2100, resulting in the displacement of 2.1 million people.

== River systems ==
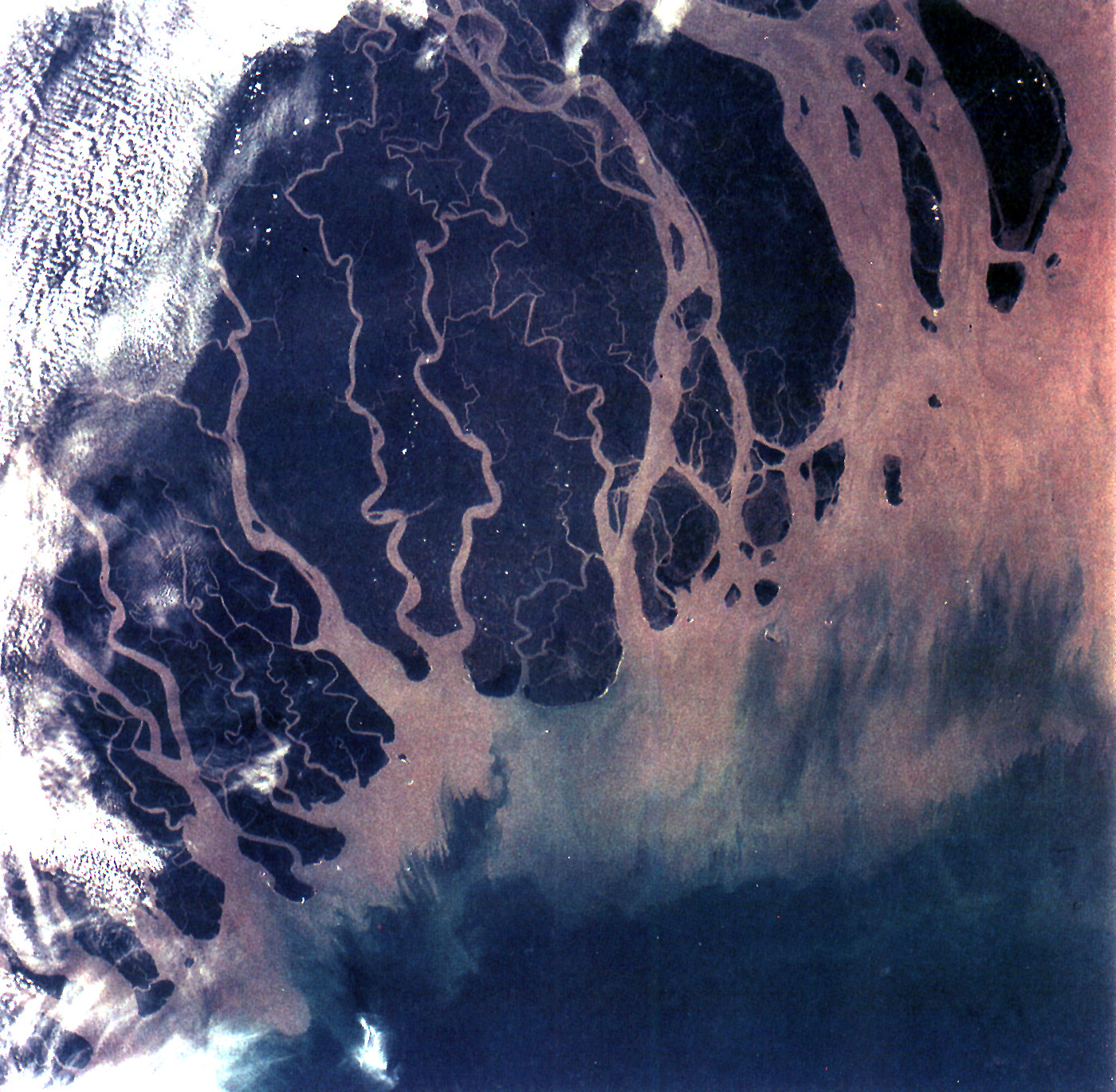
Ganges River Delta, Bangladesh and India

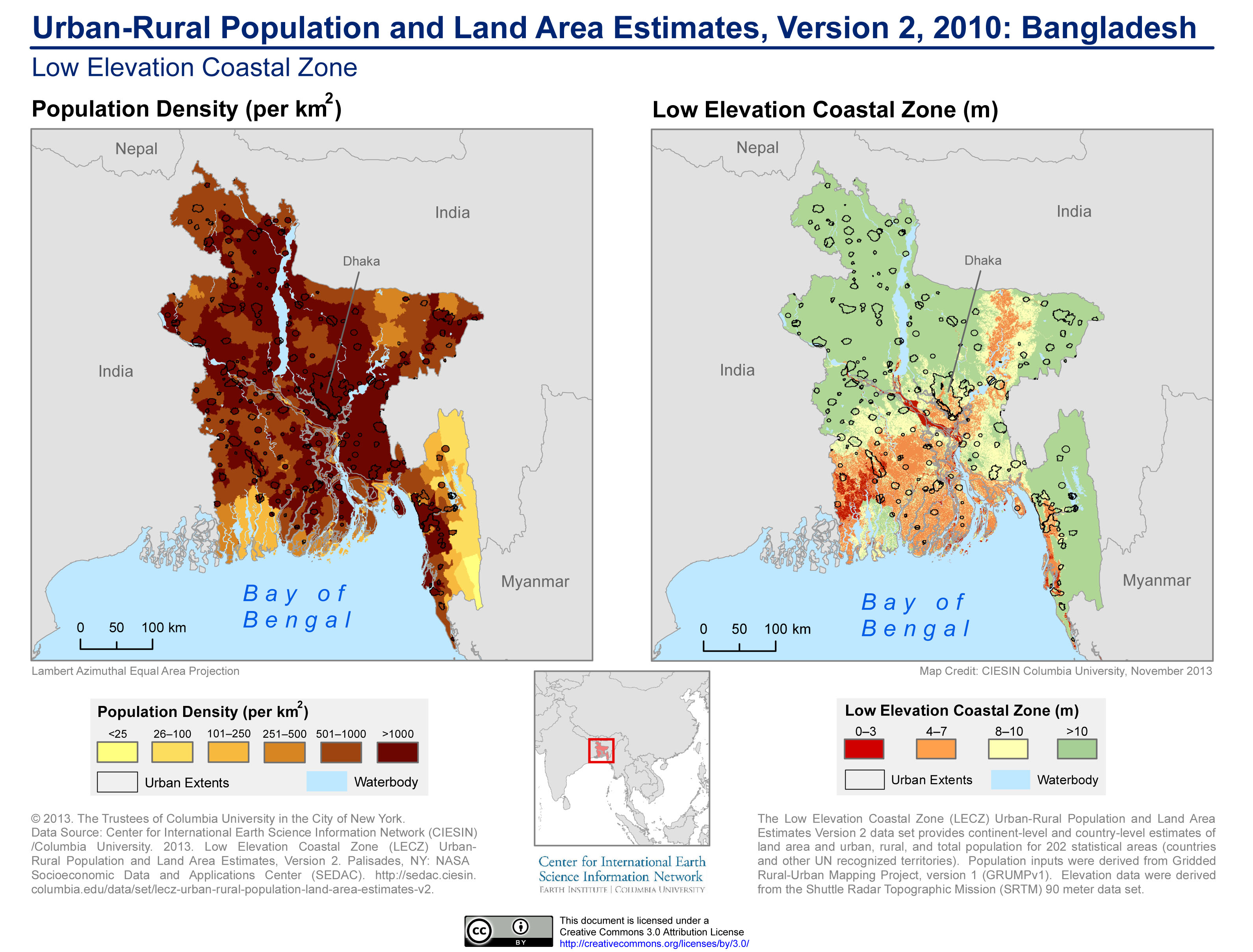
Population density and height above sea level in Bangladesh (2010). Bangladesh is especially vulnerable to sea level rise.

The rivers of Bangladesh mark both the physiography of the nation and the life of the people. About 700 in number, these rivers generally flow south. The larger rivers serve as the main source of water for cultivation and as the principal arteries of commercial transportation. Rivers also provide fish, an important source of protein. Flooding of the rivers during the monsoon season causes enormous hardship and hinders development, but fresh deposits of rich silt replenish the fertile but overworked soil. The rivers also drain excess monsoon rainfall into the Bay of Bengal. Thus, the great river system is at the same time the country's principal resource and its greatest hazard.

The profusion of rivers can be divided into five major networks. The Jamuna-Brahmaputra is 292 kilometres (181 mi) long and extends from northern Bangladesh to its confluence with the Padma. Originating as the Yarlung Tsangpo River in China's Xizang Autonomous Region (Tibet) and flowing through India's state of Arunachal Pradesh, where it becomes known as the Brahmaputra ("Son of Brahma"), it receives waters from five major tributaries that total some 740 kilometres (460 mi) in length. At the point, where the Brahmaputra meets the Tista River in Bangladesh, it becomes known as the Jamuna. The Jamuna is notorious for its shifting subchannels and for the formation of fertile silt islands (chars). No permanent settlements can exist along its banks.

The second system is the Padma-Ganges, which is divided into two sections: a 258 kilometres (160 mi) segment, the Ganges, which extends from the western border with India to its confluence with the Jamuna some 72 kilometres (45 mi) west of Dhaka, and a 126 kilometres (78 mi) segment, the Padma, which runs from the Ganges-Jamuna confluence to where it joins the Meghna River at Chandpur. The Padma-Ganges is the central part of a deltaic river system with hundreds of rivers and streams—some 2,100 kilometres (1,300 mi) in length—flowing generally east or west into the Padma.

The third network is the Surma-Meghna River System, which courses from the north-eastern border with India to Chandpur, where it joins the Padma. The Surma-Meghna, at 669 kilometres (416 mi) by itself the longest river in Bangladesh, is formed by the union of six lesser rivers. Below the city of Kalipur it is known as the Meghna. When the Padma and Meghna join, they form the fourth river system—the Padma-Meghna—which flows 145 kilometres (90 mi) to the Bay of Bengal.

This mighty network of four river systems flowing through the Bangladesh Plain drains an area of some 1.5 million square kilometres (580,000 sq mi). The numerous channels of the Padma-Meghna, its distributaries, and smaller parallel rivers that flow into the Bay of Bengal are referred to as the Mouths of the Ganges. Like the Jamuna, the Padma-Meghna and other estuaries on the Bay of Bengal are also known for their many chars.

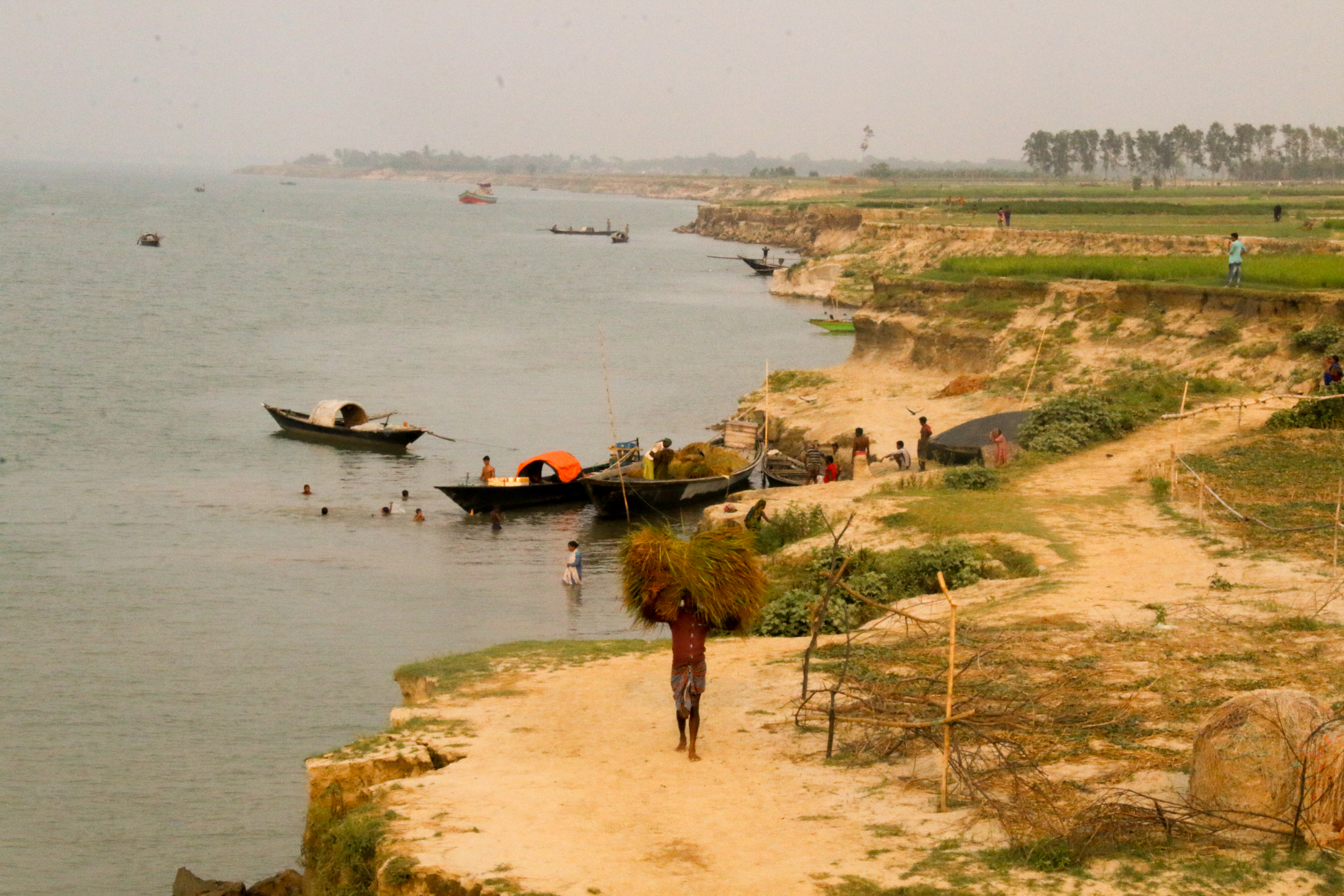
Goalundo Ghat in central Bangladesh

A fifth river system, unconnected to the other four, is the Karnaphuli. Flowing through the region of Chittagong and the Chittagong Hills, it cuts across the hills and runs rapidly downhill to the west and southwest and then to the sea. The Feni, Karnaphuli, Sangu, and Matamuhari—an aggregate of some 420 kilometres (260 mi)—are the main rivers in the region. The port of Chittagong is situated on the banks of the Karnaphuli. The Karnaphuli Reservoir and Karnaphuli Dam are located in this area. The dam impounds the Karnaphuli River's waters in the reservoir for the generation of hydroelectric power.

The Ganga–Brahmaputra rivers contribute nearly 1000 million tons/yr of sediment. The sediment contributed from these two rivers forms the Bengal Delta and Submarine fan, a vast structure that extends from Bangladesh to the south of the Equator which is up to 16.5 km thick, and contains at least 1130 trillion tonnes of sediment accumulating over the last 17 million years at an average rate of 665 million tons/yr. The Bay of Bengal used to be deeper than the Mariana Trench, the present deepest ocean point.

During the annual monsoon period, the rivers of Bangladesh flow at about 140,000 cubic metres per second (4,900,000 cu ft/s), but during the dry period they diminish to 7,000 cubic metres per second (250,000 cu ft/s). Because water is vital to agriculture, more than 60% of the net arable land, some 91,000 square kilometres (35,000 sq mi), is cultivated in the rainy season despite the possibility of severe flooding, and nearly 40% of the land is cultivated during the dry winter months. Water resources development has responded to this "dual water regime" by providing flood protection, drainage to prevent over flooding and waterlogging, and irrigation facilities for the expansion of winter cultivation. Major water control projects have been developed by the national government to provide irrigation, flood control, drainage facilities, aids to river navigation and road construction, and hydroelectric power. In addition, thousands of tube wells and electric pumps are used for local irrigation. Despite severe resource constraints, the Government of Bangladesh has made it a policy to try to bring additional areas under irrigation without salinity intrusion.

Water resources management, including gravity flow irrigation, flood control, and drainage, were largely the responsibility of the Bangladesh Water Development Board. Other public sector institutions, such as the Bangladesh Krishi Bank, the Bangladesh Rural Development Board, the Bangladesh Bank, and the Bangladesh Agricultural Development Corporation were also responsible for the promotion and development of minor irrigation works in the private sector through government credit mechanisms.

== Coastal systems ==
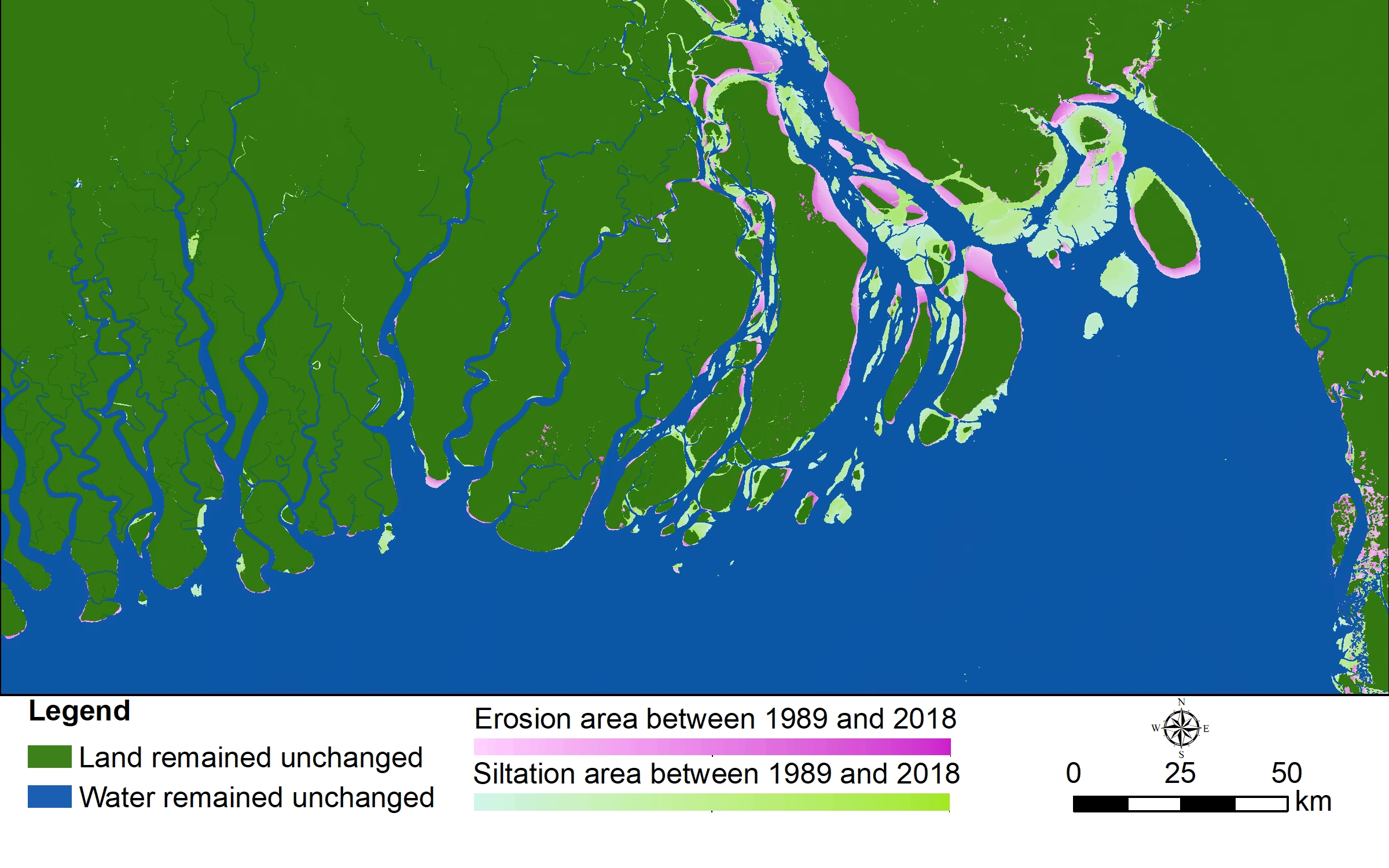
Morphological changes: the process of erosion and acceleration in the coastal area of Bangladesh between 1989 and 2018

Bangladesh coastal areas are covering the south part of Bangladesh. The main rivers of Bangladesh derived from the Himalayas carry a high level of sediment and deposit it across the Bay of Bengal. This has led to major changes in the coastal region between 1989 and 2018. Over 30 years of morphological changes many islands are losing land area. However, there has been an overall net gain in the land area due to the regular acceleration process in other parts of those islands. In the west, new islands were found, but no significant changes were observed. At the mouth of the Meghna estuary, noticeable variable changes have been observed with the formation of many new islands.

In 1989, the land area was only 28835 km^{2} (56.06%), while the water area was 22600 km^{2} (43.94%) with the region falling among 20° 34' N to 26°38 N and 88° 01' E to 92° 41' E, and with an area of 147,570 km^{2}. In 2018, the land area increased to 29426 km^{2} (57.21%); an increase of 590 km^{2} (1.15%). The land area in 1999 and 2009 was 56.49% and 56.68%, respectively, with a total increase of 0.19%. The island reformation tendency showed that the new land area increased every year by an average of 20 km^{2} (0.038) along the coastal region of Bangladesh. Plant growth has been observed in the newly formed islands over a period of 30 years. In the early stages, the islands are usually muddy waste areas that gradually changed into grasslands and Trees.

A recent global remote sensing analysis suggested that there were 2,262 km^{2} of tidal flats in Bangladesh and is therefore ranked 14th in terms of how much tidal flat occurs there. The analysis showed that the tidal flats of the Meghna River estuary have undergone considerable geomorphological change over a 33-year period, from 1984 to 2016, now only occurring in 17.1% of their initial extent despite expanding in area by 20.6%.

== Area and boundaries ==
Area:

- total: 148,460 km^{2}
- country ranking in the world: 92nd
- land: 130,170 km^{2}
- water: 18,290 km^{2}

Area comparative

- Australia comparative: slightly less than 2/3 the size of Victoria
- Canada comparative: approximately twice the size of New Brunswick
- United Kingdom comparative: slightly larger than England
- United States comparative: approximately equal in size to Iowa
- EU comparative: slightly larger than Greece

Land boundaries:

- total: 4,427 km
- border countries: Myanmar 271 km, India 4,156 km

Coastline: 580 km

Maritime claims:

- territorial sea: 12 nmi (22.2 km; 13.8 mi)
- contiguous zone: 18 nmi (33.3 km; 20.7 mi)
- exclusive economic zone: 200 nmi (370.4 km; 230.2 mi)
- continental shelf: up to the outer limits of the continental margin

Elevation extremes:

- lowest point: Indian Ocean 0 m
- highest point: Mowdok Taung in the Mowdok range at 1052 m (at N 21°47'12" E 92°36'36"), NOT Keokradong (883 m not 1,230 m) or Tazing Dong (985 m not 1,280 m as sometimes reported)

== Resources and land use ==
Natural resources: natural gas, arable land, timber, coal

Land use:
Arable land: 58.96%
Permanent crops: 6.53%
other: 34.51% (2012)

Irrigated land: 50,000 km^{2} (2008)

Total renewable water resources: 1,227 km^{3} (2011)

Freshwater withdrawal (domestic/industrial/agricultural):
total: 35.87 km^{3}/yr (10%/2%/88%)
per capita: 238.3 m^{3}/yr (2008)

== Environmental concerns ==
Natural hazards: Much of the country is submerged by floodwater in the monsoon season (and traditional settlements and agriculture are adapted to this); damaging floods occur when rivers rise higher than normal; tropical cyclones (hurricanes) and storm surges; droughts; riverbank erosion along the country's major rivers and in the Meghna estuary; earthquakes; possibly tsunamis.

Environment – current issues: Country very densely populated (1,125 per km^{2}); rapid urbanisation taking place; many people landless, and many live on and cultivate land exposed to floods, riverbank erosion or cyclones; groundwater used for drinking water and irrigation is widely contaminated with naturally occurring arsenic in some floodplain areas; water-borne diseases prevalent; surface water widely polluted by industrial, agricultural and urban effluents, affecting domestic supplies and inland fisheries; intermittent water shortages because of falling water tables in some northern and central parts of the country; increasing water and soil salinity in some coastal areas, especially in the south-west, due to abstraction of river and groundwater upstream; soil degradation due to intensive cropping, depletion of organic matter and unbalanced use of fertilisers; deforestation and soil erosion in hill areas.

Environment – international agreements:
party to: Biodiversity, Climate Change, Climate Change-Kyoto Protocol, Desertification, Endangered Species, Environmental Modification, Hazardous Wastes, Law of the Sea, Ozone Layer Protection, Ship Pollution, Wetlands

== See also ==
- 2007 South Asian floods
- Bangladesh Climate Change Resilience Fund
- List of islands of Bangladesh
