= Arthur Marshall =

Arthur Marshall may refer to:

== Sportspeople ==
- Arthur Marshall (rugby union) (1855–1909), Scotland international rugby union player
- Arthur Marshall (footballer) (1881–?), English footballer
- Arthur Marshall (American football) (1969–2026), American football wide receiver

== Politicians ==
- Arthur Marshall (Australian politician) (1934–2018), Australian former politician and tennis player
- Arthur Marshall (British politician) (1870–1956), English Liberal Party politician
- Arthur Wellington Marshall (1841–1918), mayor of Huntingdon
- Arthur Marshall (Mississippi politician) (1862–1946), state legislator in Mississippi

== Writers ==
- Arthur Marshall (broadcaster) (1910–1989), British writer and broadcaster
- Arthur Hammond Marshall (1866–1934), English novelist who wrote under the pseudonym Archibald Marshall
- Arthur Calder-Marshall (1908–1992), British novelist, essayist, memoirist and biographer

== Scientists ==
- Arthur R. Marshall (1919–1985), scientist, ecologist and Everglades conservationist
- Arthur Milnes Marshall (1852–1893), English zoologist

== Others ==
- Arthur George Marshall (1858–1915), British architect and photographer
- Arthur Marshall (engineer) (1903–2007), British aviation pioneer and businessman
- Arthur Marshall (composer) (1881–1968), African-American composer and performer of ragtime music
- Arthur Featherstone Marshall (1818–1877), English Anglican priest who converted to Roman Catholicism
- Arthur H. Marshall (1885/1886–1951), American hiker/climber, the first person to reach every U.S. state highpoint
