= High Point =

High Point may refer to:

== Places ==
=== United States ===
==== California ====
- High Point (California), the summit of Palomar Mountain

==== Florida ====
- High Point, Hernando County, Florida
- High Point, Palm Beach County, Florida
- High Point (Cocoa, Florida), an area in the town of Cocoa

==== Georgia ====
- High Point (Atlanta), a neighborhood on the south side of the city of Atlanta
- High Point, Georgia, an unincorporated community in Walker County

==== Iowa ====
- High Point Township, Decatur County, Iowa

==== Missouri ====
- High Point, Missouri

==== New Jersey ====
- High Point (New Jersey), a prominence on Kittatinny Mountain that is New Jersey's highest elevation.
- High Point Monument, 220-foot high obelisk veterans memorial
- High Point State Park, a 15,000-acre state park in Montague Township, New Jersey

==== New York ====
- High Point (Olive, Ulster County, New York)

==== North Carolina ====
- High Point, North Carolina
  - High Point University, located in the above community

==== Pennsylvania ====
- High Point Raceway, a motocross track in Mount Morris

==== South Carolina ====
- High Point (Jenkinsville, South Carolina), listed on the NRHP in South Carolina

==== Washington ====
- High Point, Seattle, a neighborhood in the Delridge district of West Seattle
- High Point, Washington, an unincorporated community

=== Other ===
- High Point Estates, Alberta, Canada
- High Point, Bradford, West Yorkshire, England

== Schools ==
- High Point University, High Point, North Carolina, U.S.
- High Point High School, Beltsville, Maryland, U.S.
- High Point Regional High School, Sussex, New Jersey, U.S.

== Other ==
- High Point (coffee), a brand of instant decaffeinated coffee
- Camp High Point, a summer camp in West Shokan, New York
- High Point Market, a home furnishing industry trade show held biannually in High Point, North Carolina
- USS High Point (PCH-1), a U.S. Navy patrol craft
- High Point Solutions Stadium, the football stadium at Rutgers University in New Brunswick, New Jersey
- Hi-Point Firearms
- The highest point in a given area (highpointing)

== See also ==
- Lists of highest points
- Highpoint (disambiguation)
- High water mark
- Turning Point (disambiguation)
