= Highpoint =

Highpoint can refer to:

- Highpoint, Florida, an unincorporated community near Tampa Bay
- Highpoint, Mississippi, an unincorporated community in Winston County
- Highpoint Shopping Centre in Melbourne, Australia
- Highpoint (building), an apartment building in London, United Kingdom.
- Highpoint I, a set of 1930s apartment buildings in London, United Kingdom.
- Highpointing, the sport of visiting the point with the highest elevation within some area
- Highpoint (film), a 1982 American film starring Christopher Plummer
- Hi-Point Firearms

== See also ==
- Lists of highest points
- High Point (disambiguation)
- Highpoint Prison (disambiguation)
