= Peakbagger.com =

Online mountain database website

- Screenshot
- Company type: Privately held
- Available in: English
- Founded: 1987; 39 years ago
- Founder: Greg Slayden
- Website: www.peakbagger.com
- Commercial: Free

Peakbagger.com is an American free online public database of mountain summits, primarily geared towards highpointers and peakbaggers created by Greg Slayden in 1987 and launched in 2004.

== Overview ==
Peakbagger.com offers its users the ability to log ascents, write trip reports, make lists of summits, upload GPX tracks, and add summits to its database. The Peakbagger.com database features over 200,000 individually documented summits worldwide and is a significant resource for trip reports and route directions, especially for obscure summits.

Notable users of Peakbagger.com include Eric Gilbertson.

Peakbagger.com has garnered criticism for promoting trespassing, as some specific peaks, especially certain county high points, are on private property. Despite this, Peakbagger explicitly states on its front page that it does not condone any dangerous or illegal activity, and peaks that are on private land are tagged as such.

== History ==
Peakbagger.com was originally devised by American mountaineer and programmer Greg Slayden in 1987, initially being a simple text file listing mountains. In 1997, the Peakbagger.com domain was launched, with the mountain database being released in 2004. Peakbagger.com has had its functionality continually updated since, but had its last major visual update in 2004.

At some point in the 2010s, a free Peakbagger app was developed by Andrew Kirmse for IOS and Android devices.

In 2017, a conference was held in Seattle, Washington featuring Slayden giving a presentation on the website.
