= Eamon Ginge Fullen =

British mountaineer

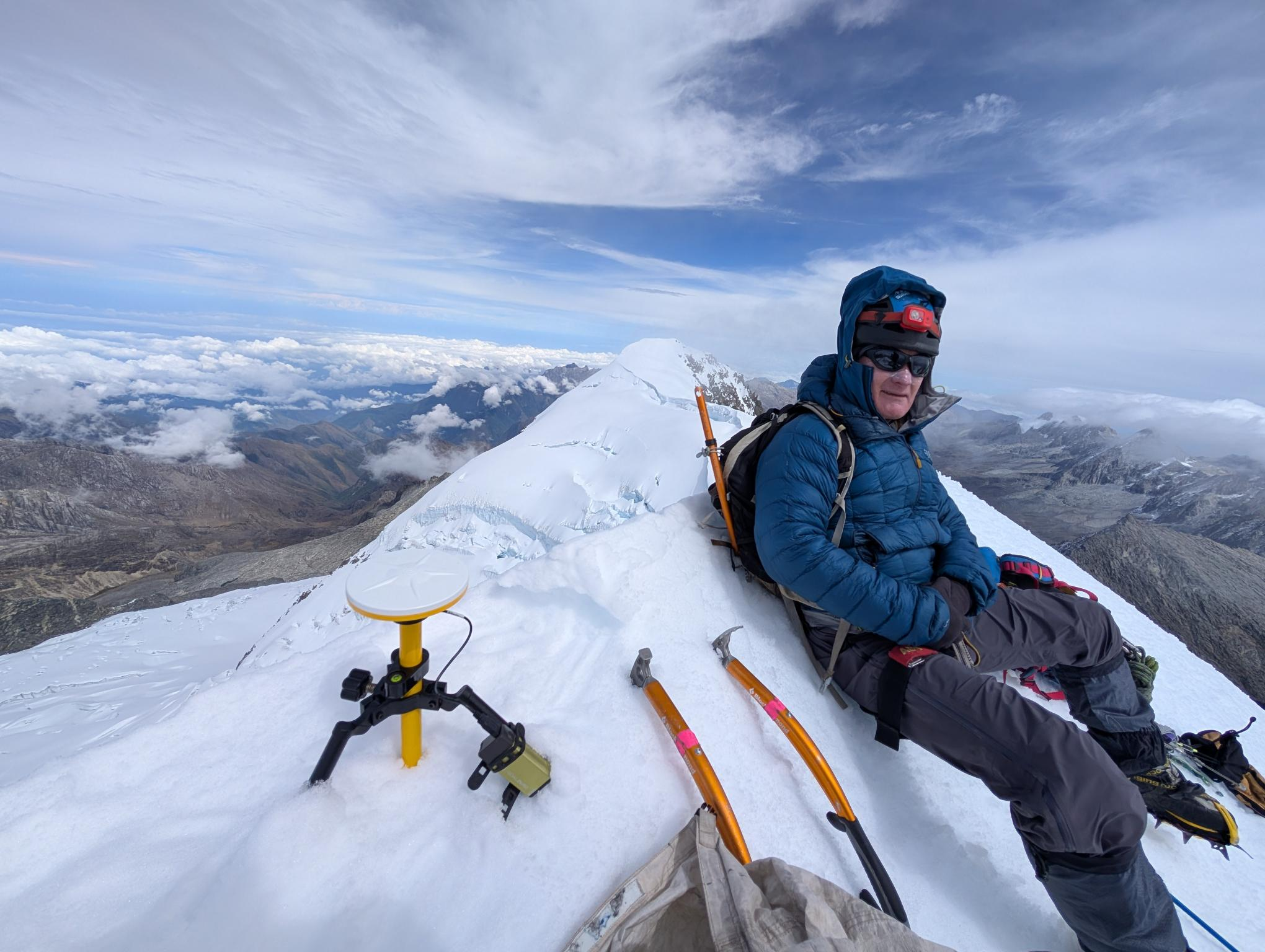
- Fullen on the summit of Pico Simón Bolívar in 2024

Personal information
- Nationality: British
- Born: 1967/1968 (age 57–58)

Climbing career
- Type of climber: Peak bagger; Highpointer

Eamon Christopher McKinley "Ginge" Fullen QGM (born 1967/1968) is a British mountaineer and former Royal Navy clearance diver who holds the Guinness World Records for the fastest climbs of every country high point in Europe and Africa.

== Early life and diving career ==
Born in Nigeria, Fullen joined the Royal Navy in 1984, when he was 16 years old. As a clearance diver, he specialized in removing unexploded ordinances in the oceans around the world. He was awarded the Queen's Gallantry Medal in the 1988 New Year Honours for saving lives during the 1987 Herald of Free Enterprise ferry disaster whilst serving in the Royal Navy.

Fullen broke his neck in 1990 while playing rugby.

In 2007, while paying off climbing expenses, a vessel Fullen was working on in the Bight of Benin was attacked by Nigerian pirates.

== Climbing career ==
Growing up inspired by Edmund Hillary and Tenzing Norgay, Fullen climbed Mount Elbrus, the highest mountain in Russia and Europe, in 1992. The year after, he climbed Kilimanjaro and Denali, where he struggled with altitude sickness. Fullen suffered a heart attack on Mount Everest in 1996, which led him to cap his ascents at 6,000 metres (20,000 feet). In 1999, Fullen became the first person to climb the highest point in each of the 47 European countries.

After completing the European high points, Fullen made the first ascent of Uzbekistan's highest point and Bangladesh's highest point. He then shifted focus toward Africa, moving to the continent in 2002. After one year, Fullen climbed every country high point in Africa except for Bikku Bitti, Libya. After two unsuccessful expeditions, Fullen summited Bikku Bitti in December 2005. (Note: Fullen achieved this when there were 53 African countries, before the separation of South Sudan.)

In 2018, after summiting Pico da Neblina, the highest peak of Brazil, Fullen contracted leishmaniasis.

Fullen has climbed 174 country high points, the most of any person in the world.

== See also ==
- Tibesti Mountains
- Saka Haphong
