= List of South African provinces by highest point =

The following is a list of the provinces of South Africa ranked by highest point in elevation.

== List ==
Rank	Province	Highest point	Elevation	Coordinates
1	KwaZulu-Natal	Mafadi	3,451 m (11,322 ft)	29.202857°S 29.358324°E
2	Free State	Namahadi Peak	3,274 m (10,741 ft)	28.772286°S 28.822285°E
3	Eastern Cape	KwaDuma	3,019 m (9,905 ft)	30.467214°S 28.155861°E
4	Mpumalanga	Die Berg	2,331 m (7,648 ft)	25.20935°S 30.149692°E
5	Western Cape	Seweweekspoortpiek	2,325 m (7,628 ft)	33.398214°S 21.367753°E
6	Northern Cape	Murch Point	2,156 m (7,073 ft)	31.693607°S 24.513417°E
7	Limpopo	Iron Crown	2,126 m (6,975 ft)	23.999197°S 29.946223°E
8	Gauteng	Toringkop	1,913 m (6,276 ft)	26.511319°S 28.229797°E
9	North West	Nooitgedacht West	1,852 m (6,076 ft)	25.861053°S 27.530813°E
