= Lists of highest points =

A list of highest points typically contains the name, elevation, and location of the highest point in each of a set of geographical regions. Such a list is important in the sport of highpointing. A partial list of highpoint lists is below:

== Worldwide ==
=== Physical geography ===
==== Global ====
- List of highest mountains on Earth
- Summits farthest from the Earth's center
- List of islands by highest point

==== By geographical region ====
- List of highest points on each continent
- List of elevation extremes by country
  - List of countries by highest point
  - List of countries whose highest point is not on the mainland
  - List of highest points of African countries
  - List of highest points of Asian countries
  - List of highest points of European countries
  - List of highest points of Oceanian countries
  - List of highest points of North American countries
  - List of highest points of South American countries
- List of elevation extremes by region

=== Human geography ===
- List of highest towns by country
  - List of highest cities
  - List of highest large cities

== Within a particular country ==
=== Highest points of administrative divisions ===
- List of Brazilian states by highest point
- List of highest points of Canadian provinces and territories
- List of Chinese administrative divisions by highest point
- List of the highest points of the German states
- List of Indian states and union territories by highest point
- List of Indonesian provinces by highest point
- List of Irish counties by highest point
- List of Italian regions by highest point
- List of Nigerian states by highest point
- List of highest points of Norwegian counties
- List of South African provinces by highest point
- List of Swiss cantons by elevation (including highest points in each Swiss canton)

==== Within the United Kingdom ====
- List of highest points in the United Kingdom
  - List of English counties by highest point
  - List of counties of England and Wales in 1964 by highest point
  - List of Welsh principal areas by highest point
  - List of Scottish counties by highest point
  - List of Scottish council areas by highest point
  - List of Northern Ireland counties by highest point
  - List of Northern Ireland districts by highest point
  - List of highest points in London

==== Within the United States ====
- List of U.S. states and territories by elevation (including highest points in each U.S. state)
  - List of highest U.S. county high points
    - List of highest points in California by county
    - List of Colorado county high points
    - List of highest points in Oregon by county
    - List of highest points in Nevada by county
    - List of highest points in Washington by county
  - List of Florida's highest points
  - List of highest United States cities by state or territory

=== Mean elevations of administrative divisions ===
- List of Swiss cantons by elevation (including mean elevations of each Swiss canton)
- List of U.S. states and territories by elevation (including mean elevations of each U.S. state)
  - List of highest counties in the United States

== See also ==
- Lists of mountains
  - List of mountains by elevation
- List of tallest buildings and structures
