= Lester Brinkley =

American gridiron football player (1965–2002)

Profile
- Position: Defensive end

Personal information
- Born: May 13, 1965; Ruleville, Mississippi
- Died: July 7, 2002 (aged 37); Houston, Texas
- Listed height: 6 ft 6 in (1.98 m)
- Listed weight: 270 lb (122 kg)

Career information
- College: Mississippi

Career history
- Dallas Cowboys (1990); New York Jets (1991); Winnipeg Blue Bombers (1992); Iowa Barnstormers (1995)

Career statistics
- Games played: 6
- Stats at Pro Football Reference

Career AFL statistics
- Tackles: 6
- Sacks: 1
- Receiving yards: 11
- Receiving TDs: 1
- Stats at ArenaFan.com

Lester F. Brinkley (born May 13, 1965 – July 7, 2002) was an American football defensive end in the National Football League for the Dallas Cowboys for the 1990 NFL season. He played college football at the University of Mississippi.
