= Leroy Bass =

American baseball player (1918-2003)

- Catcher
- Born: May 5, 1918; Ruleville, Mississippi, U.S.
- Died: May 7, 2003 (aged 85); El Paso, Texas, U.S.
- Batted: Unknown Threw: Unknown

Negro league baseball debut
- 1940, for the Homestead Grays

Last appearance
- 1940, for the Birmingham Black Barons
- Stats at Baseball Reference

Teams
- Homestead Grays (1940); Birmingham Black Barons (1940)

Leroy "Red" Bass (May 5, 1918 – May 7, 2003) was an American professional baseball catcher in the Negro leagues. He played with the Homestead Grays and the Birmingham Black Barons in 1940.
