= Ruleville-Drew Airport =

Airport in Mississippi, US

- IATA: none; ICAO: none; FAA LID: M37

Summary
- Airport type: Public
- Owner: Cities of Ruleville and Drew
- Serves: Drew & Ruleville, Mississippi
- Elevation AMSL: 137 ft / 42 m
- Coordinates: 33°46′35″N 090°31′30″W

Map
- Location of airport in Mississippi M37 (the United States)

Runways
Direction	Length		Surface
Direction	ft	m	Surface
18/36	3,000	914	Asphalt

Statistics (2012)
- Aircraft operations: 10,400
- Based aircraft: 5
- Source: Federal Aviation Administration

Ruleville-Drew Airport (FAA LID: M37) is a public use airport in Sunflower County, Mississippi, United States. Jointly operated by the cities of Drew and Ruleville, it is located two nautical miles (4 km) south of Drew, and north of Ruleville.

This airport is included in the National Plan of Integrated Airport Systems for 2011–2015, which categorized it as a general aviation facility. In 2010 the airport received a $88,997 Federal Aviation Administration Airport Improvement Program grant to rehabilitate the airport beacon and to fund the installation of a water system.

== Facilities and aircraft ==
Ruleville-Drew Airport covers an area of 55 acres (22 ha) at an elevation of 137 feet (42 m) above mean sea level. It has one runway designated 18/36 with an asphalt surface measuring 3,000 by 60 feet (914 x 18 m).

For the 12-month period ending February 7, 2012, the airport had 10,400 general aviation aircraft operations, an average of 28 per day. At that time there were five single-engine aircraft based at this airport.

== See also ==
- List of airports in Mississippi
