= Bikku Bitti =

Highest mountain of Libya

- Pic Bette
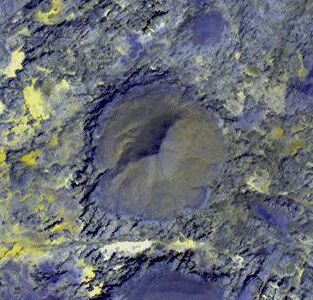
- Bikku Bitti as viewed by TerraLook ASTER in 2002

Highest point
- Elevation: 2,266 m (7,434 ft)
- Listing: Country high point
- Coordinates: 22°0′13″N 19°12′24″E

Geography
- Location within Libya
- Location: Libya
- Parent range: Tibesti Mountains

Climbing
- First ascent: December 2005; Ginge Fullen (Note: First recorded ascent)

Bikku Bitti, also known as Bette Peak, is the highest mountain in Libya at 2,266–2,267 metres (7,434–7,438 ft). It is located on the Dohone spur of the Tibesti Mountains in southern Libya, near the Chadian border.

In December 2005, after two failed attempts, Ginge Fullen became the first known person to summit Bikku Bitti.
