= Ruleville, Mississippi =

- City
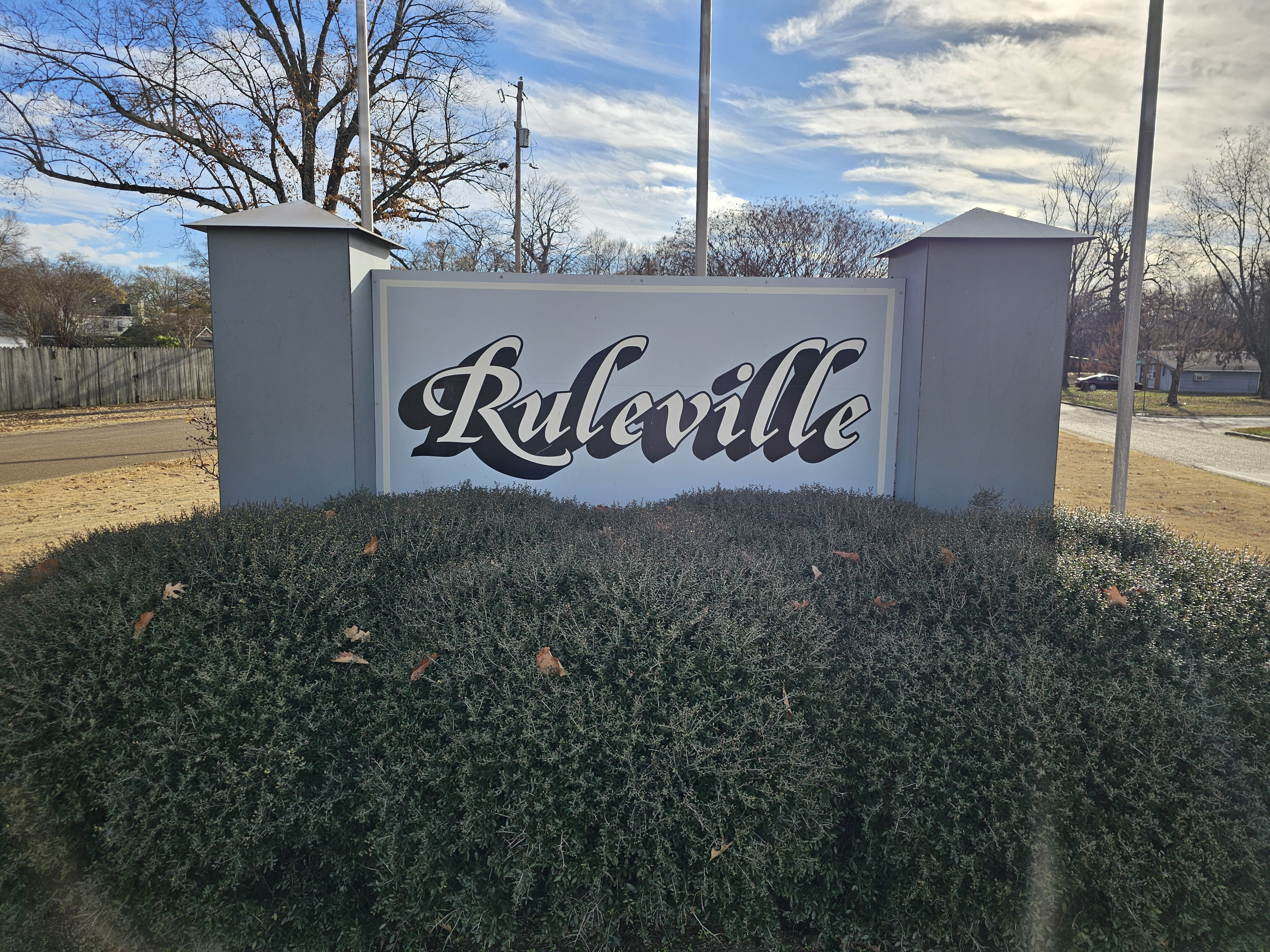
- Ruby Avenue in Ruleville

- Location of Ruleville, Mississippi

- Location in the United States
- Coordinates: 33°43′28″N 90°33′00″W
- Country: United States
- State: Mississippi
- County: Sunflower

Area
  - Total: 2.53 sq mi (6.54 km^{2})
  - Land: 2.52 sq mi (6.52 km^{2})
  - Water: 0.0077 sq mi (0.02 km^{2})
- Elevation: 135 ft (41 m)

Population (2020)
  - Total: 2,642
  - Density: 1,049.1/sq mi (405.07/km^{2})
- Time zone: UTC-6 (Central (CST))
  - Summer (DST): UTC-5 (CDT)
- ZIP code: 38771
- Area code: 662
- FIPS code: 28-64200
- GNIS feature ID: 2404654

Ruleville is a city in Sunflower County, Mississippi, United States, in the Mississippi Delta region. As of the 2020 census, Ruleville had a population of 2,642. It is the second-largest community in the rural county.

== History ==
Ruleville was described as "surrounded by a fine fertile country and timber lands". Development of the settlement followed construction of the Yazoo and Mississippi Valley Railroad, which established a stop here. The village was laid out in 1898 by J. W. Rule, for whom it was named. In September 1899 the official petition to Governor Anselm J. McLaurin to incorporate contained 98 names of the 'citizens and electors of Sunflower County...[who] reside in the village' noting that 150 people currently lived inside the village.

The rural area was being developed for cotton plantations after the American Civil War. Ruleville was established as an important cotton shipping point on the railroad. By the early 1900s, Ruleville had telephone and telegraph facilities, about 20 businesses, two white churches and one black church, a water works system, an electric light plant, three public gins, and excellent public schools for the white population. The population in 1900 was 336. The Bank of Ruleville was established in 1903.

During the Civil Rights Movement that expanded beginning in the 1950s, Fannie Lou Hamer, a farm worker, started a movement for poor people.

== Geography ==
According to the United States Census Bureau, the city has a total area of 2.5 square miles (6.5 km^{2}), of which 2.5 square miles (6.5 km^{2}) is land and 0.39% is water.

Ruleville is along U.S. Route 49W. Ruleville is about 15 miles (24 km) from the Mississippi State Penitentiary (Parchman).

== Demographics ==
Historical population
Census	Pop.	Note	%±
1900	226		—
1910	451		99.6%
1920	1,022		126.6%
1930	1,181		15.6%
1940	1,378		16.7%
1950	1,521		10.4%
1960	1,902		25.0%
1970	2,351		23.6%
1980	3,332		41.7%
1990	3,245		−2.6%
2000	3,234		−0.3%
2010	3,007		−7.0%
2020	2,642		−12.1%
U.S. Decennial Census

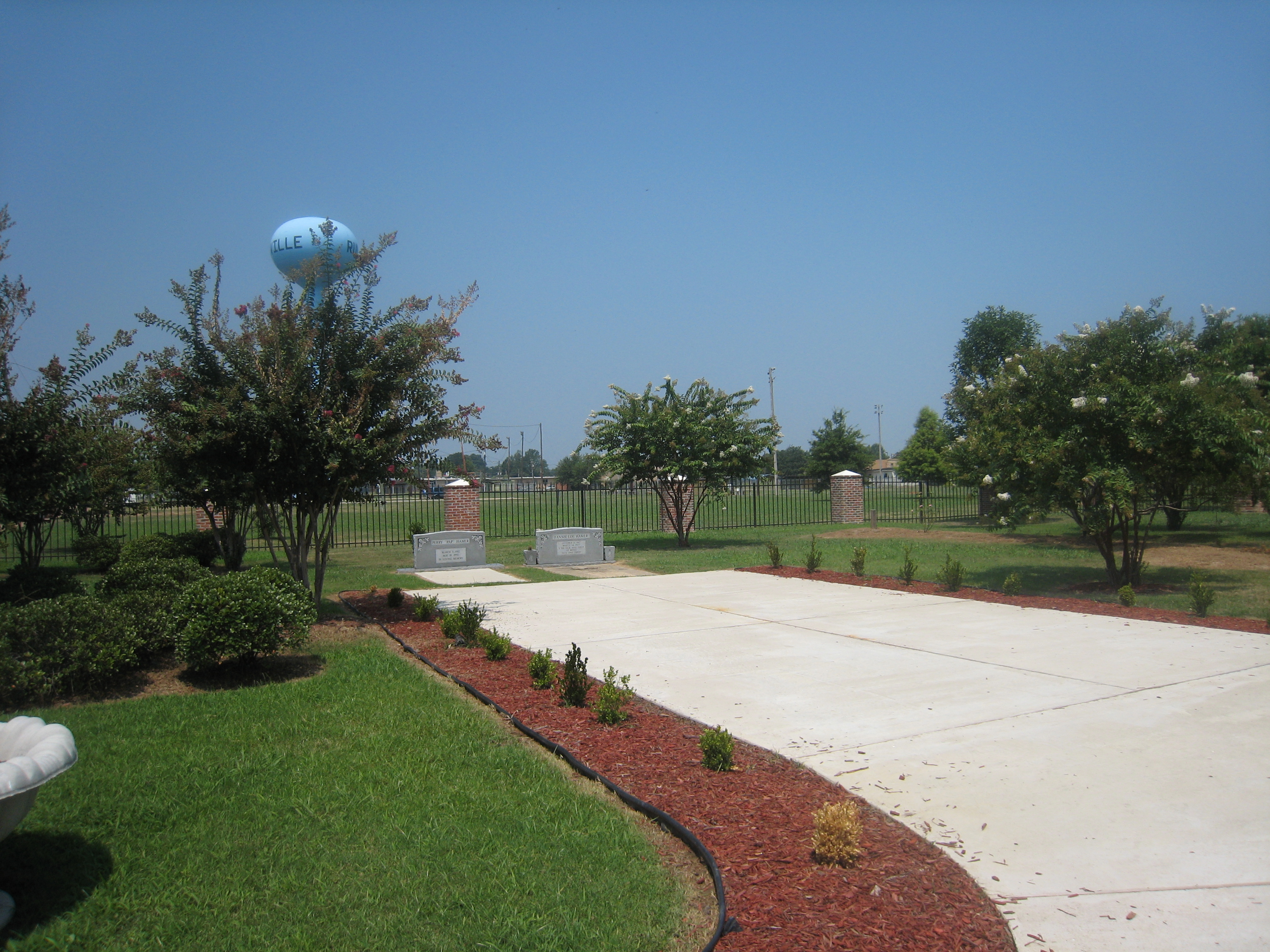
Fannie Lou Hamer Memorial in Ruleville

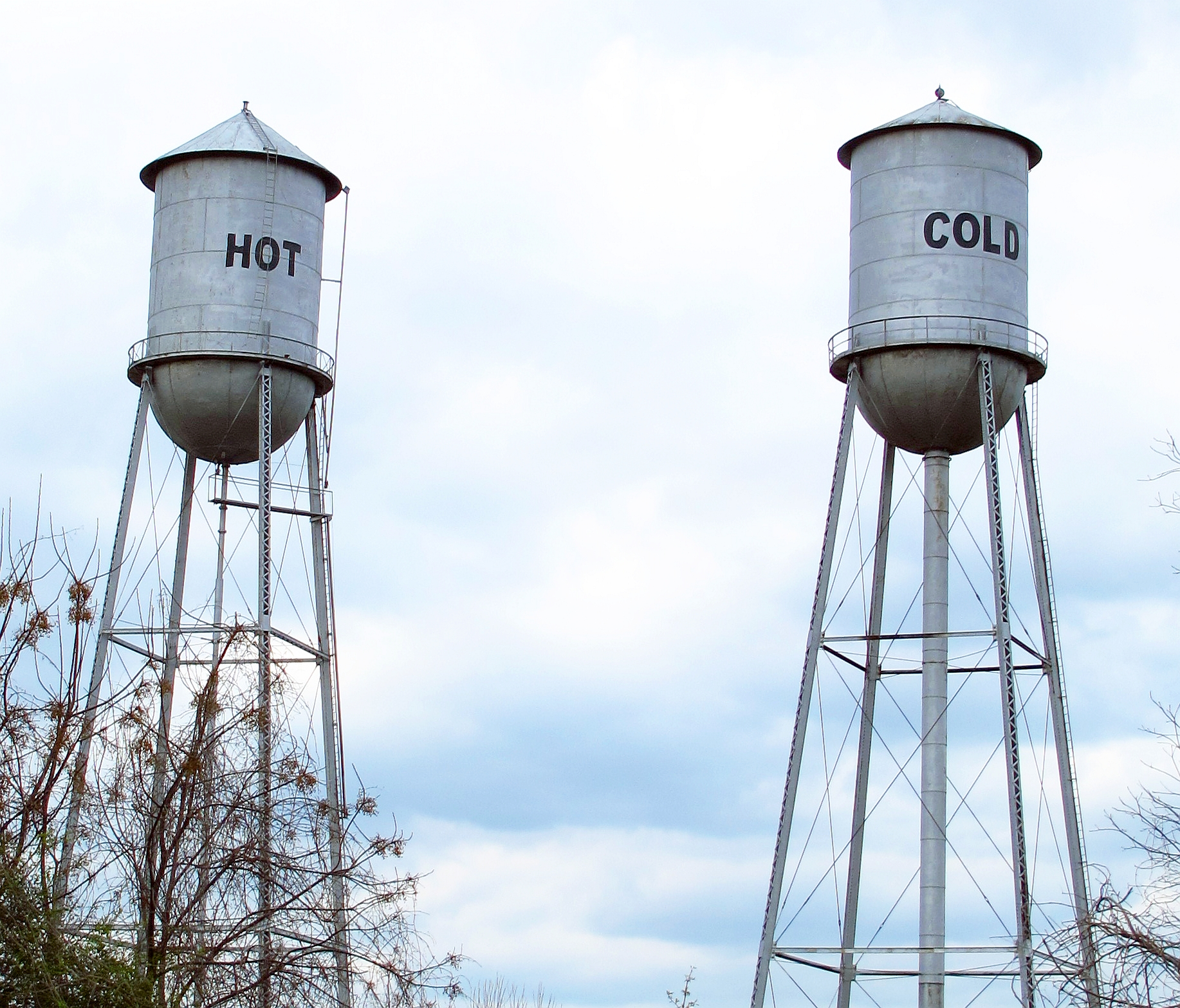
Water towers

=== Racial and ethnic composition ===
Ruleville city, Mississippi – Racial and ethnic composition Note: the US Census treats Hispanic/Latino as an ethnic category. This table excludes Latinos from the racial categories and assigns them to a separate category. Hispanics/Latinos may be of any race.
Race / Ethnicity (NH = Non-Hispanic)	Pop 2000	Pop 2010	Pop 2020	% 2000	% 2010	% 2020
White alone (NH)	602	386	344	18.61%	12.84%	13.02%
Black or African American alone (NH)	2,586	2,565	2,238	79.96%	85.30%	84.71%
Native American or Alaska Native alone (NH)	2	4	0	0.06%	0.13%	0.00%
Asian alone (NH)	14	4	0	0.43%	0.13%	0.00%
Native Hawaiian or Pacific Islander alone (NH)	0	10	0	0.00%	0.33%	0.00%
Other race alone (NH)	0	2	6	0.00%	0.07%	0.23%
Mixed race or Multiracial (NH)	2	15	39	0.06%	0.50%	1.48%
Hispanic or Latino (any race)	28	21	15	0.87%	0.70%	0.57%
Total	3,234	3,007	2,642	100.00%	100.00%	100.00%

=== 2020 census ===
As of the 2020 census, Ruleville had a population of 2,642. The median age was 41.9 years. 22.1% of residents were under the age of 18 and 20.8% of residents were 65 years of age or older. For every 100 females there were 86.2 males, and for every 100 females age 18 and over there were 82.4 males age 18 and over.

0.0% of residents lived in urban areas, while 100.0% lived in rural areas.

There were 918 households and 521 families in Ruleville, of which 36.2% had children under the age of 18 living in them. Of all households, 23.6% were married-couple households, 18.1% were households with a male householder and no spouse or partner present, and 50.0% were households with a female householder and no spouse or partner present. About 28.7% of all households were made up of individuals and 12.4% had someone living alone who was 65 years of age or older.

There were 1,005 housing units, of which 8.7% were vacant. The homeowner vacancy rate was 1.6% and the rental vacancy rate was 5.6%.

Racial composition as of the 2020 census
Race	Number	Percent
White	345	13.1%
Black or African American	2,247	85.0%
American Indian and Alaska Native	0	0.0%
Asian	0	0.0%
Native Hawaiian and Other Pacific Islander	0	0.0%
Some other race	8	0.3%
Two or more races	42	1.6%

=== 2010 census ===
As of the 2010 United States census, there were 3,007 people living in the city. The racial makeup of the city was 85.3% black, 12.8% white, 0.1% Native American, 0.1% Asian, 0.3% Pacific Islander, 0.1% from some other race and 0.5% from two or more races. 0.7% were Hispanic or Latino of any race.

=== 2000 census ===
As of the census of 2000, there were 3,234 people, 1,020 households, and 774 families living in the city. The population density was 1,278.3 inhabitants per square mile (493.6/km^{2}). There were 1,096 housing units at an average density of 433.2 per square mile (167.3/km^{2}). The racial makeup of the city was 80.77% black, 18.65% white, 0.43% Asian, 0.06% Native American, 0.03% from other races, and 0.06% from two or more races. Hispanic or Latino of any race were 0.87% of the population.

There were 1,020 households, out of which 36.6% had children under the age of 18 living with them, 35.5% were married couples living together, 34.6% had a female householder with no husband present, and 24.1% were non-families. 21.4% of all households were made up of individuals, and 11.7% had someone living alone who was 65 years of age or older. The average household size was 3.03 and the average family size was 3.55.

In the city, the population was spread out, with 31.3% under the age of 18, 11.2% from 18 to 24, 23.0% from 25 to 44, 19.2% from 45 to 64, and 15.3% who were 65 years of age or older. The median age was 31 years. For every 100 females, there were 80.7 males. For every 100 females age 18 and over, there were 71.5 males.

The median income for a household in the city was $21,351, and the median income for a family was $23,036. Males had a median income of $25,104 versus $21,063 for females. The per capita income for the city was $11,664. About 29.5% of families and 36.0% of the population were below the poverty line, including 47.7% of those under age 18 and 27.4% of those age 65 or over.

== Education ==
The City of Ruleville is served by the Sunflower County Consolidated School District. Schools serving Ruleville and in Ruleville include Ruleville Central Elementary School, Ruleville Middle School, and Thomas E. Edwards, Sr. High School (formerly Ruleville Central High School).

North Sunflower Academy is in an unincorporated area of Sunflower County, about 2 miles (3.2 km) north of Ruleville. The school originated as a segregation academy, founded to evade orders to integrate the public schools.

Delta State University is located ten miles away in Cleveland.

During the Civil Rights Movement, 1964 was Freedom Summer, organizing for voter registration and education, and adding to the curriculum in the local segregated schools for blacks. The "Ruleville Freedom School" was established to try to provide an alternative to the second-class education that had been provided to black students. It tried to prepare students to be part of change and a democratic society, to prepare for the civil freedom that the movement supported and would press the political system to provide.

The Sunflower County Library operates the Horace Stansel Memorial Library in Ruleville.

== Infrastructure ==
=== Transportation ===
Ruleville-Drew Airport is in unincorporated Sunflower County, between Ruleville and Drew. The airport is jointly operated by the cities of Ruleville and Drew.

=== Hotel ===
- Ruleville Inn Motel

=== Healthcare ===
The North Sunflower Medical Center is a rural critical access hospital located in Ruleville, with 95 beds and approximately 500 employees. The medical center includes a surgical center, sleep center and outpatient rehabilitation unit. The center partners with other facilities to provide specialty care, including the University of Mississippi Medical Center's Diabetes Telehealth Network and Mississippi Sports Medicine Center.

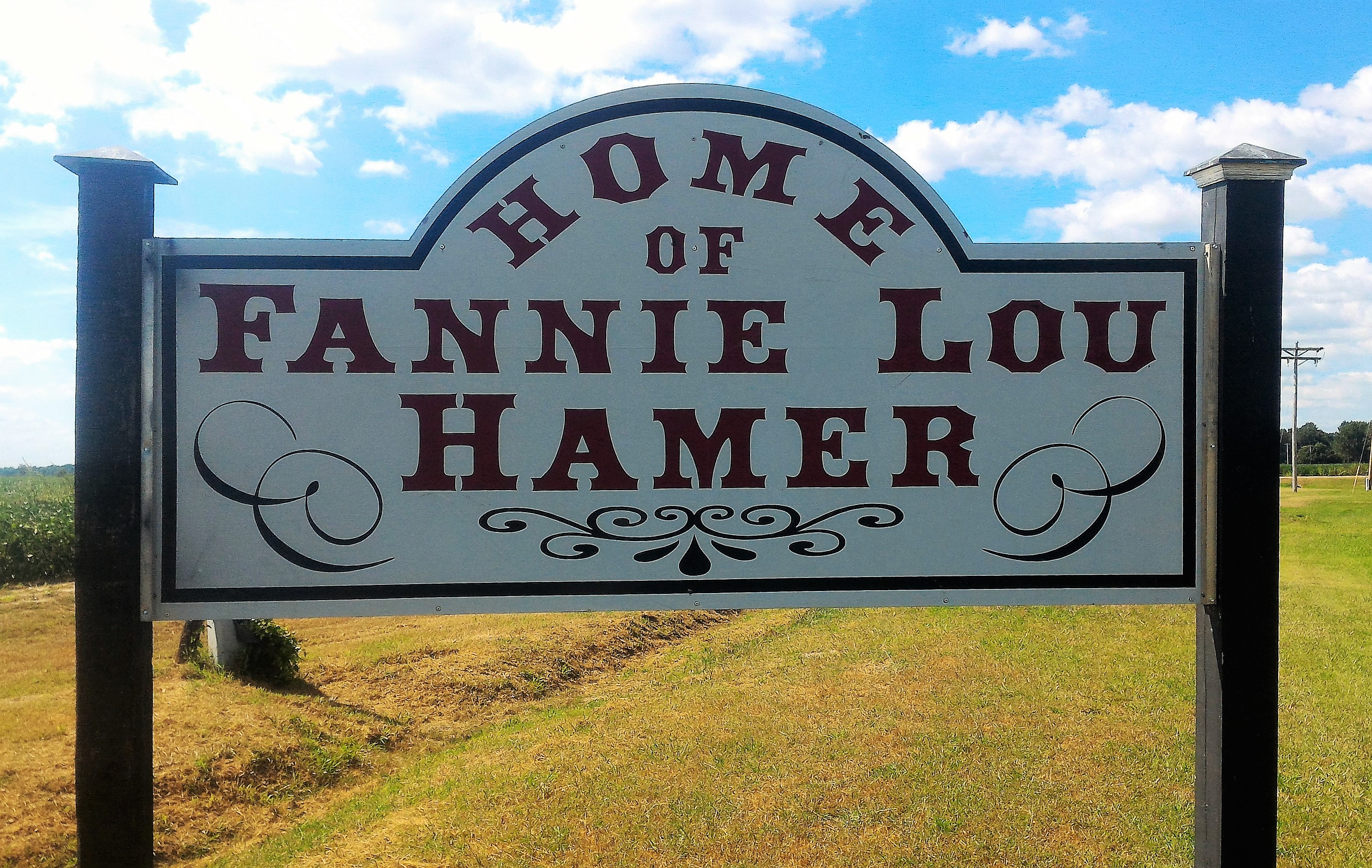
A sign honoring Fannie Lou Hamer for her work in Ruleville, Mississippi.

== Notable people ==
- Hugh M. Arant, member of the Mississippi House of Representatives from 1968 to 1972
- Leroy Bass, former Negro league catcher
- Marion Enoch Boyles, state legislator and teacher
- Lester Brinkley, American football player
- Melissa Cookston, chef and author
- Robert Crook, Mississippi politician and lawyer
- Fannie Lou Hamer, civil rights leader
- Arthur Marshall, member of the Mississippi Senate from 1924 to 1926
- Dave Minor, former National Basketball Association player
- Jimmy Rogers, Blues singer and musician
- Horace Stansel, civil engineer
