= List of Nigerian states by highest point =

The following is a list of the states of Nigeria ranked by the highest point in elevation.

== List ==
Rank	State	Highest point	Elevation m (ft)	Notes
1	Taraba State	Chappal Waddi	2,419 m (7,936 ft)	Highest point in Nigeria
2	Niger State	Tsaunin Kwaiki	2,359 m (7,740 ft)	
3	Borno State	Kumari	2,280 m (7,480 ft)	
4	Adamawa State	Mount Dimlang	2,042 m (6,699 ft)	
5	Plateau State	Shere Hills	1,829 m (6,001 ft)	
6	Cross River State	Sankwala Mountains	1,800 m (5,906 ft)	
7	Bauchi State	Masaijeh Hill	1,593 m (5,226 ft)	
8	Ondo State	Idanre Hill	1,053 m (3,455 ft)	
9	Federal Capital Territory	Plateau	840 m (2,756 ft)	
10	Sokoto State	Yakunuji Hill	450 m (1,476 ft)	Highest point in Sokoto State
