= Arthur R. Marshall =

American conservationist

- Born: March 2, 1919; Charleston, South Carolina
- Died: February 18, 1985 (aged 65)

Arthur Raymond Marshall Jr. (March 2, 1919 – February 18, 1985) was a scientist and Everglades conservationist who spearheaded efforts to preserve Florida’s wetlands.

== Early life and education ==
Born in Charleston, South Carolina, Marshall moved to West Palm Beach, Florida at the age of six and embraced the outdoor lifestyle of what was, at the time, a largely rural community. He was known to spend many hours fishing in Lake Worth off the center bridge to Palm Beach and in a floating wheelbarrow that he converted into a boat. He and his brothers, Jack and Bill, after moving to Miami, often swam nude in the Miami River. He graduated from Miami Edison High School.

Prior to his college education he was a combat officer in WW2. He landed on Omaha Beach as a platoon commander with the 81st Chemical Mortar Battalion about 45 minutes after the invasion began on D-Day, and was field promoted to Company Commander. He and his unit stayed in almost constant front line duty from D-Day to the end of the war, then liberating a Nazi labor camp. After returning from the war Marshall married Kathlene Eppen, a nurse whom he had met in England during the war, and they had two sons. He then began studies at the University of Florida where he graduated with a degree in biology Phi Beta Kappa (1953). There he met Dr. Carr and his wife Marjorie and became good friends. The Carrs were involved in conservation issues at that time, including protecting sea turtles in the Caribbean Sea, and Marshall probably developed his keen interest in conservation from that relationship. Marjorie Carr later began a years long campaign against the Cross Florida Barge Canal and Marshall assisted her in that effort.

Other influences that helped him choose a career as a conservationist where his contacts with some of the great biologists/conservationists in South Florida...these included Dr. Frank Craighead, Dr. Durbin Tabb, Mr. John Clark, Mr. Nathaniel Reed, Mr. Johnny Jones, Dr. Gerald Parker, Mrs. Marjory Stoneman Douglas, Mr. Timothy Keyser and many others. His interest in conservation developed to a high intensity as he realized how development had altered much of Florida's natural ecosystems.

Marshall received (1957) an MS in marine science from the University of Miami where his research was on the biology of the snook (Family Centropomidae) (5 species) in South Florida. He worked for several years as a biologist for the Bureau of Commercial Fisheries (later renamed as the National Marine Fisheries Service) in Miami where he studied shrimp trawling and other kinds of offshore fisheries. In 1955 he began working for the United States Fish and Wildlife Service (USFWS) at their office in Vero Beach, Florida. His work there included ichthyological surveys studies on the St. Johns River and assessments of many dredge and fill project applications throughout Florida. He became the office director of the USFWS office in Vero in about 1965. He resigned from the Service in 1970 and moved to Miami where he became a professor of urban studies at the University of Miami.

== Career ==
Major projects that he was involved in while an employee of the United States Fish and Wildlife Service (USFWS) included a study of the potential impacts of the Sanibel Causeway on water quality and fisheries in Pine Island Sound, water quality studies (especially salinity) in the 10,000 islands area of the Everglades, siting studies and ecological impacts of the proposed Jetport that would otherwise have been constructed in the Everglades, Marco Island development impact studies, Cross Florida Barge Canal Impact studies, an expansion of Pelican Island National Wildlife Refuge, establishment of the Key Biscayne National Monument, and many other projects around Florida. It was his move to Miami and his friendship with Mrs. Douglas that led him to focus on Everglades issues. In addition to his role as a scientist he spent much time traveling around South Florida to speak to conservation groups and to county commission meetings about the threat of development (especially farming and water diversions) to the Everglades. He was also appointed to the board of the South Florida Water Management District in 1972-73. Since his views were usually quite different that those of the other board members he was eventually forced to resign from the board. (After his death his views became much more widely accepted, and his papers were widely referenced by scientists developing an Everglades Restoration plan).

Marshall's appointment at the University of Miami also ended when his grant supported projects ended. He and Kay moved to Interlachen, Florida, where he built a house and eventually found work at the University of Florida. His job at UF ended when the State of Florida and the University System underwent severe budget cuts. All UF staff who had less than 2 years of service at that time were released. Marshall had also been appointed to the first chairmanship of board of the then newly created St. Johns Water Management District. Again Marshall soon ran into political disputes that led to his dismissal from the board by Governor Reuben Askew. Marshall spent the balance of his career as a consultant to conservation groups throughout Florida. He continued to campaign, at his own expense, for protection of the Everglades and against the construction of the Cross Florida Barge Canal.

== Everglades projects ==
One of Marshall's ideas was the concept of “system generalists.” When applied to the Everglades, a generalist means professionals who are not simply scientists specializing in one discipline, but those who possess a full understanding of the chemistry, geology, hydrology, ecology and overall environmental significance of the system and also have an appreciation for its historic and aesthetic value.

He also wrote what is referred to as “The Marshall Plan” in the early 1970s, which was a blueprint for Everglades restoration. The plan emphasized the need for 'sheet flow', the slow movement of surface water in a southerly direction that is natural and essential to the Everglades ecosystem. The scheme promoted in the Marshall Plan helps retain water in the wetlands and preserves the original habitat found in the ancient Everglades.

== Legacy ==
Douglas, author of the 1947 book The Everglades: River of Grass, paid tribute to Marshall in some of her writing. In Florida: the Long Frontier, she wrote, “Although my phrase 'River of Grass' first awakened people to the notion of the Everglades as a river, it was Arthur Marshall who filled in all the blanks. More than any other person, he stretched our idea of the Everglades and how we are connected, which created the most powerful arguments for restoring the ecosystem.”

In 1984, a year before his death, Marshall was named “Conservationist of the Decade” by the Florida Wildlife Federation. He asked to have a chair at the University of Florida named after him, leading to an initial $600,000 endowment for the Arthur R. Marshall Eminent Scholar Chair in the Department of Zoology.

Two other living memorials bear his name: the Arthur R. Marshall Loxahatchee National Wildlife Refuge in Boynton Beach and the Arthur R. Marshall Foundation, a non-profit West Palm Beach organization founded by Marshall’s nephew, John Arthur Marshall, with the help of Tim Keyser, in 1998. The Foundation has as its mission to preserve and restore the Florida Everglades, in part by educating young people and the public about Everglades ecology through comprehensive public outreach and environmental education programs.

Marshall's numerous writings and salient correspondence were donated to the University of Florida's Smather's Library by his widow...the late Kathlene Eppen Marshall. Additional archives are held at the ArtMarshall.org office in West Palm Beach, and have been made available to researchers. Some of his major works have been placed in the Everglades digital library at Florida International University.
