= Peak bagging =

Goal to reach a collection of summits

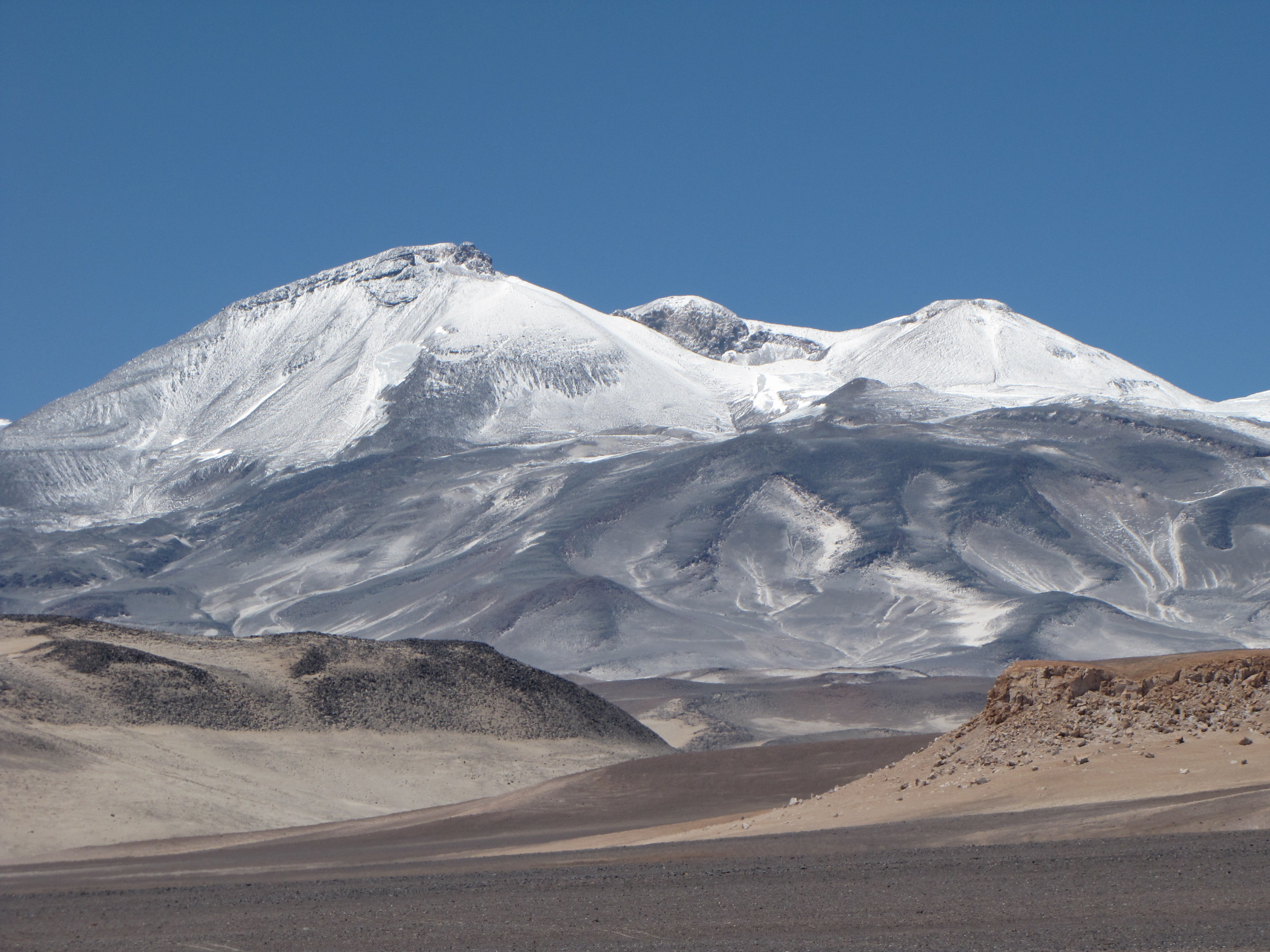
- Ojos del Salado, a member of the Seven Second Summits

Characteristics
- Type: Recreational activity

Presence
- Country or region: Worldwide

Peak bagging or hill bagging is an activity in which hikers, climbers, and mountaineers attempt to reach a collection of summits, published in the form of a list. This activity has been popularized around the world, with lists such as 100 Peaks of Taiwan, four-thousand footers, 100 Famous Japanese Mountains, the Sacred Mountains of China, the Seven Summits, the Fourteeners of Colorado, and the eight-thousanders becoming the subject of mass public interest.

There are numerous lists that a peakbagger may choose to follow. A list usually contains a set of peaks confined to a geographical area, with the peaks having some sort of subjective popularity or objective significance, such as being among the highest or most prominent of the area. Some maps and lists may be inaccurate, however, which has implications for climbers and peak-baggers who rely on publicly reported data.

Although peak bagging as such is a fundamental part of the sport of mountaineering, the term is instead strongly associated with non-technical activities like hiking and snowshoeing. A handful of lists, such as the eight-thousanders and the Alpine four-thousanders, have an extremely high reputation among mountaineers, but in general the term "peak bagging" is a pejorative to many climbers.

Peak bagging is distinguished from highpointing, where the goal is to reach the highest point in some geographic area (e.g. county, state, or country), whether or not it is a peak.

== History ==
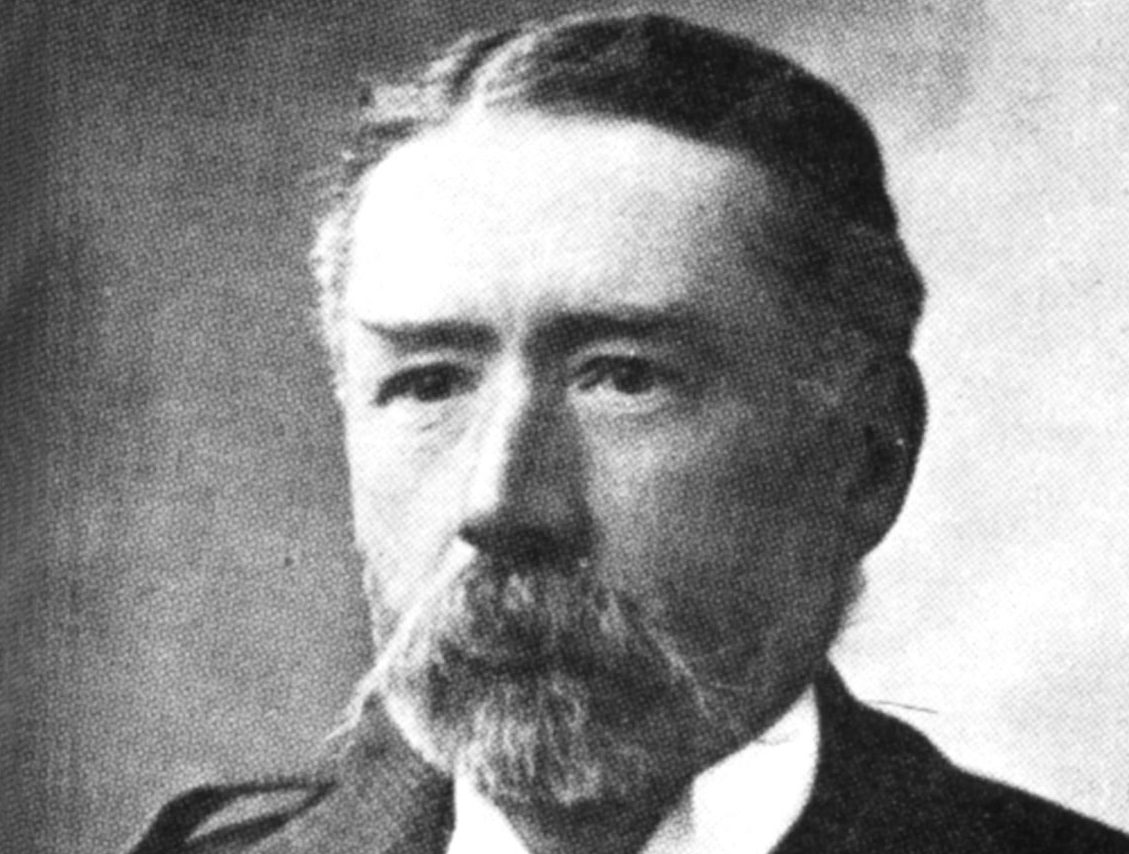
Sir Hugh Munro, 4th Baronet, creator of Munro's Tables, an early list for peak baggers

During the Silver Age of Alpinism in the late 19th century, most of the unclimbed major mountaineering objectives were reached. With the "closing" of the age of discovery of mountain peaks, interest shifted towards finding enjoyable ways to climb already-ascended mountains. In the 1890s, Sir Hugh Munro created the Munro list, containing the highest peaks of Scotland; summiting the peaks on such lists soon became known as peak bagging.

The list of the Adirondack High Peaks, compiled by Robert and George Marshall, was first published in 1922. Almost at the same time, the list of Colorado fourteeners became a peak bagging challenge. Backpacking increased in popularity in the United States between the 1950s and 1980s, causing additional clubs to organize peak-bagging lists, including the New Hampshire and New England Four-thousand footers, the Northeast 111, and the Catskill Mountain 3500 Club.

== Aspects ==
The central part of peak bagging is the list, which details all the summits one must obtain to complete or finish the list.

=== Clubs ===
Clubs are often formed to gather people who share an interest in bagging peaks on a list. Some clubs are specialized, such as the Sierra Peaks Section or the Adirondack Forty-Sixers. Alpine clubs may include peak bagging as one of the activities for members; notable alpine clubs that maintain peak bagging lists include the Scottish Mountaineering Club, the Mazamas of Oregon and the Mountaineers of Washington.

=== Books ===
Another source of lists are mountaineering guidebooks that detail information about how to climb peaks in a certain region. 100 Famous Japanese Mountains, Fifty Classic Climbs of North America, and the Alpine Club Guides are notable examples of such books.

== Summit logs ==
In some parts of the world, a summit register or summit log may be located in a watertight container such as a jar or can, stashed in a protected spot. Peak baggers often will write a note or log entry and leave it in the "summit log" as a record of their accomplishment. Increasingly, peak baggers are also logging their summits online by signing virtual summit logs. One popular website is Peakbagger.com, founded by Greg Slayden, which lists mountains and regional highpoints. It allows peak baggers to record their summits.

== Arguments for and against ==
The term "peak bagging" can have a negative connotation among traditional mountaineers. Traditional climbers or adventurers may argue that peak bagging devalues the experience of climbing in favour of the achievement of reaching an arbitrary point on a map; that bagging reduces climbing to the status of stamp collecting or train spotting; or that is seen as obsessive and beside the point. For example, in explaining why he chose to remove some minor peaks from his guidebook, climber Steve Roper wrote:

Most of the peaks had as their first ascenders those who in a former day would have been called explorers but now could only be thought of as peakbaggers, interested primarily in trudging endlessly over heaps of stones, building cairns, and inserting their business cards into specifically designed canisters especially carried for this purpose. But perhaps I am being too harsh. They're having their fun.

Some peak baggers say peak bagging is a motivation to keep reaching new summits. For mountain range peak lists, attaining the goal provides the peak bagger with a deeper appreciation for the topography of the range. For example, each peak is typically enjoyed from multiple aspects as the peak bagger also climbs the major neighboring summits.

There is also concern that encouraging the climbing of certain mountains has caused trail damage from erosion through heavy use and, where mountains have no trails, created trails. Proponents note that many peak baggers become active in maintaining trails and more aware about mitigating damage than casual hikers.

== See also ==
- Eight-thousanders, summits above 8,000 metres (26,247 feet)
- Seven Summits, the highest mountain on each continent
- Seven Second Summits, the second highest mountain on each continent
- Volcanic Seven Summits, the highest volcanos on each continent
- List of mountain lists, list of all peak bagging classifications
- Highpointing, activity of ascending to the highest point in a given area
- Geocaching, location-based game
- Peakbagger.com
