= High Point (coffee) =

Coffee brand

High Point was a brand of instant decaffeinated coffee marketed and distributed by The Folger Coffee Company, a subsidiary of Procter & Gamble. The production technique was created by Dennis Grubbs, an employee of Procter & Gamble at the time. It was introduced on a test basis in 1975. In 1980, the product was launched nationally as a competitor to Kraft Foods' Sanka.

The coffee was advertised as being "97% caffeine free."

Procter & Gamble's national launch of the beverage received a heavy marketing push with print ads and national TV advertisements, some featured prominently on P&G's soap operas. High Point is mainly known today by its television advertisements. Initial marketing centered on the slogan "Decaffeinate the ones you love." A year later, the campaign was ditched in favor of a celebrity endorsement. Several famous TV spots featured Lauren Bacall extolling the virtues of the decaffeinated brew. Bacall claimed that High Point was "a coffee-lover's dream" due to its special way of "capturing flavor - deep brewed flavor." Another commercial featured the actress in the back of a limo, saying that "Rushing for an eight 'o clock curtain every night means giving up a lot of things - but coffee ISN'T ONE OF 'EM!" One memorable ad featured Bacall backstage at rehearsal, commenting that "Around here, we don't LIKE coffee - we LOVE it!"

Subsequent ads did not feature Bacall, but instead focused on homemakers and female executives who wanted coffee without the caffeine and the bitterness.

Initial sales of the product were good, and P&G made a serious push to unseat Sanka.

The product was given a packaging redesign in the mid-1980s. The label changed from bold orange and brown coloring to a more homestyle look featuring greens and tans.

High Point coffee was discontinued by P&G in 1993.

Forty years later, in May 2024, Maya Rudolph spoofed Bacall's High Point coffee commercials in a SNL skit.

Procter & Gamble still retains the rights to the brand.
