= List of countries whose highest point is not on the mainland =

Countries whose highest elevation lies outside their mainland territory

This is a list of countries whose highest point is not on the mainland, i.e. sovereign states whose highest natural elevation lies on an island, an overseas territory or another non-contiguous part of the country, rather than on the country's principal landmass.

Whether a country belongs on this list depends on how the country is defined. The list below therefore distinguishes between:

- countries whose highest point lies outside the mainland but within the country's integral territory (e.g. Spain, whose highest peak Teide is in the Canary Islands)
- countries whose highest point lies in a dependent, autonomous or overseas territory (e.g. the Kingdom of Denmark, whose highest peak Gunnbjørn Fjeld is in Greenland)
- countries whose claim depends on a territorial claim in Antarctica, which is held in abeyance under the Antarctic Treaty System (e.g. Norway and New Zealand)

New surveys occasionally change a country's highest point. A 2017 re-measurement by the British Antarctic Survey established Mount Hope as the highest peak in territory claimed by the United Kingdom, and a 2024 survey lowered Mount Scenery, the highest point of the Kingdom of the Netherlands, by seven metres.

A counter-example is the United States: its highest point, Denali, lies in Alaska, which is separated from the contiguous United States by Canada but is still part of the continental United States, on the North American mainland. (Note: In official American usage the term "continental United States" sometimes excludes Alaska, and colloquially "the mainland" often means only the contiguous states. Under that stricter reading the United States would qualify for this list, since its highest point outside Alaska is Mount Whitney in California at 4,418 m (14,495 ft), well below Denali at 6,190 m (20,310 ft). Geologically, however, Alaska is attached to the North American landmass, making it a semi-exclave of the United States rather than an overseas territory.)

== Highest point within integral territory ==
| Country | Highest point | Elevation | Location | Highest point on the mainland | Elevation |
|---|---|---|---|---|---|
| Equatorial Guinea | Pico Basilé | 3,008 m (9,869 ft) | Bioko island | unnamed point in the interior plateau of Río Muni (Note: No single named summit is consistently identified as the highest point of mainland Río Muni, whose forested plateau reaches its greatest elevations near the border with Gabon.) | c. 1,219 m (3,999 ft) |
| Malaysia | Mount Kinabalu | 4,095 m (13,435 ft) | Sabah, Borneo (Note: East Malaysia lies on the island of Borneo, while the mainland portion of the country is Peninsular Malaysia.) | Mount Tahan | 2,187 m (7,175 ft) |
| Netherlands | Mount Scenery | 870 m (2,850 ft) (Note: 2024 survey by the Dutch Kadaster and the Royal Netherlands Meteorological Institute.) | Saba, Caribbean Netherlands (Note: Saba has been a special municipality of the Netherlands proper since the dissolution of the Netherlands Antilles in 2010. Before 2010 the highest point of the Netherlands was the Vaalserberg.) | Vaalserberg | 322 m (1,056 ft) |
| Portugal | Mount Pico | 2,351 m (7,713 ft) | Pico Island, Azores | Torre | 1,993 m (6,539 ft) |
| South Korea | Hallasan | 1,950 m (6,400 ft) | Jeju Island (Note: See the section on other territorial claims.) | Jirisan | 1,915 m (6,283 ft) |
| Spain | Teide | 3,715 m (12,188 ft) (Note: The World Factbook gives 3,718 m (12,198 ft) for Teide.) | Tenerife, Canary Islands | Mulhacén | 3,479 m (11,414 ft) |

== Highest point in a dependent or overseas territory ==
| Country | Highest point | Elevation | Location | Highest point on the mainland | Elevation |
|---|---|---|---|---|---|
| Australia | Mawson Peak | 2,745 m (9,006 ft) | Heard Island (external territory) (Note: Including its claim to the Australian Antarctic Territory, Australia's highest point is Dome Argus, listed below.) | Mount Kosciuszko | 2,228 m (7,310 ft) |
| Denmark | Gunnbjørn Fjeld | 3,694 m (12,119 ft) | Greenland (autonomous territory of the Danish Realm) (Note: The highest point of the Faroe Islands, Slættaratindur at 882 m (2,894 ft), also exceeds the highest point of metropolitan Denmark.) | Møllehøj | 171 m (561 ft) |
| United Kingdom | Mount Paget | 2,934 m (9,626 ft) | South Georgia (British Overseas Territory) (Note: Including its claim to the British Antarctic Territory, the highest point is Mount Hope, listed below.) | Ben Nevis | 1,345 m (4,413 ft) |

== Highest point in a claimed Antarctic territory ==
Territorial claims in Antarctica are not universally recognised and are held in abeyance under the Antarctic Treaty of 1959. Without their claims, the highest points of Norway and New Zealand are on the mainland.

| Country | Highest point | Elevation | Location | Highest point on the mainland | Elevation |
|---|---|---|---|---|---|
| Australia | Dome Argus | 4,093 m (13,428 ft) | Australian Antarctic Territory (claimed) | Mount Kosciuszko | 2,228 m (7,310 ft) |
| New Zealand | Mount Kirkpatrick | 4,528 m (14,856 ft) | Ross Dependency (claimed) | Aoraki / Mount Cook (Note: New Zealand has no continental mainland. Aoraki / Mount Cook lies on the South Island, the larger of the country's two main islands.) | 3,724 m (12,218 ft) |
| Norway | Jøkulkyrkja | 3,148 m (10,328 ft) | Queen Maud Land (claimed) (Note: Norway's highest point outside the mainland and Antarctica is Beerenberg on Jan Mayen, at 2,277 m (7,470 ft).) | Galdhøpiggen | 2,469 m (8,100 ft) |
| United Kingdom | Mount Hope | 3,239 m (10,627 ft) | British Antarctic Territory (claimed) | Ben Nevis | 1,345 m (4,413 ft) |

== Other territorial claims ==
Territorial claims outside Antarctica seldom change the identity of a country's highest point. The main exception in this list is South Korea, whose constitution defines its territory as "the Korean peninsula and its adjacent islands". Under that claim its highest point would be Paektu Mountain (2,744 m or 9,003 ft) on the mainland border between North Korea and China, rather than Hallasan on Jeju Island.

Other claims have no such effect. India claims Gilgit-Baltistan, administered by Pakistan, where K2 (8,611 m or 28,251 ft) would replace Kangchenjunga (8,586 m or 28,169 ft) as the country's highest point, but both peaks stand on the Asian mainland. Argentina claims South Georgia, where Mount Paget is far below Aconcagua (6,962 m or 22,841 ft) on the Argentine mainland.

== Countries with transcontinental mainland ==
A related but distinct situation arises in transcontinental countries, whose highest point may lie in a different continent from most of their territory while still being on a contiguous mainland. Their highest points are on the mainland under the definition used in this article, but continent-restricted lists, such as the list of highest points of European countries, treat several of them as special cases:

- Turkey's highest point, Mount Ararat (5,137 m or 16,854 ft), lies in Anatolia in Asia, while its European part (East Thrace) rises only to about 1,030 m or 3,380 ft at Mahya Dağı, the summit of the Yıldız Mountains.
- Kazakhstan is situated primarily in Central Asia, but about 4% of its territory, west of the Ural River, lies in Eastern Europe. Its highest point, Khan Tengri (7,010 m or 23,000 ft, including its ice cap), stands in the Tian Shan in Asia, while the European portion is low-lying steppe.
- Egypt's highest point, Mount Catherine (2,629 m or 8,625 ft), lies on the Sinai Peninsula, which is conventionally placed in Asia, while the rest of the country is in Africa.
- Russia is the converse case: although about three quarters of its territory is in Asia, its highest point, Mount Elbrus (5,642 m or 18,510 ft), is also the highest point of Europe. The highest summit of its Asian part is Klyuchevskaya Sopka on the Kamchatka Peninsula, at about 4,750 m or 15,580 ft.
- Georgia and Azerbaijan are similar converse cases. Their highest points, Shkhara (5,193 m or 17,037 ft) and Bazardüzü (4,466 m or 14,652 ft), lie on the main crest of the Greater Caucasus, whose watershed is a common convention for the Europe–Asia boundary. That convention conditionally places both summits in geographical Europe, while most of the territory of the two countries lies south of the crest, in Asia.
- Indonesia, an archipelago without a mainland, is conventionally an Asian country, yet its highest point, Puncak Jaya (4,884 m or 16,024 ft), lies on New Guinea, which is geographically part of Oceania. Its highest peak in Asia is Mount Kerinci (3,805 m or 12,484 ft) on Sumatra.

== See also ==
- List of elevation extremes by country
- List of islands by highest point
- Lists of highest points
- List of enclaves and exclaves
