= High Point, Washington =

Unincorporated community in King County, Washington

- Unincorporated community
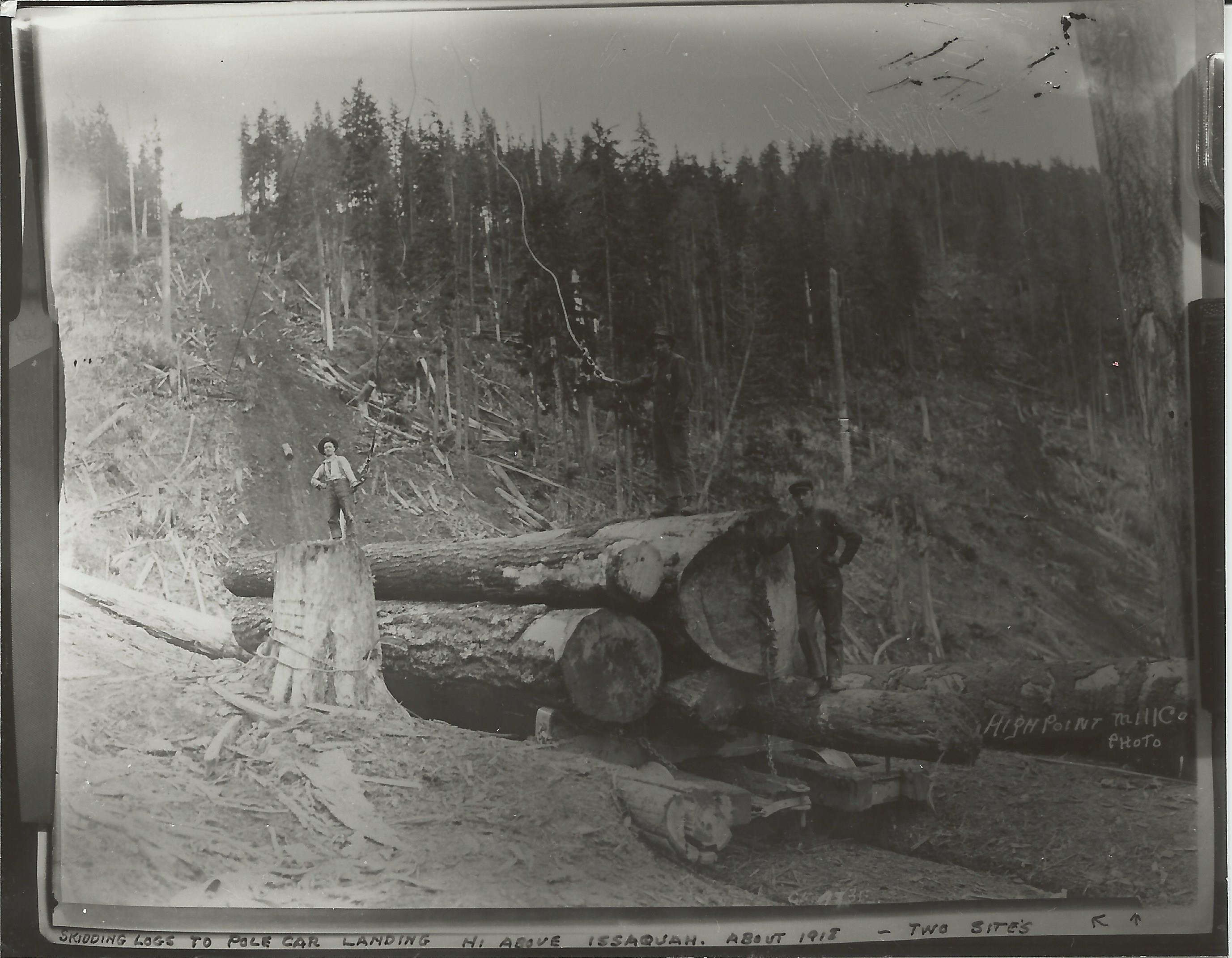
- 1918 photo taken on the Tiger Mountain skid row coming down to the High Point mills

- Location in Washington and the United States High Point (the United States)
- Coordinates: 47°31′59″N 121°58′42″W
- Country: United States
- State: Washington
- County: King
- Elevation: 499 ft (152 m)
- Time zone: UTC-8 (Pacific (PST))
  - Summer (DST): UTC-7 (PDT)
- Area code: 360
- GNIS feature ID: 1520785

High Point is an unincorporated community in King County, in the U.S. state of Washington.

High Point, on the eastern fringe of Issaquah, is named for its location at the highest point on a railroad grade. Once the location of a significant lumber mill and railway station, it is now only a small collection of houses on large lots along I-90 at the "High Point Way" exit, and a Tiger Mountain trailhead.

== History ==
High Point was founded by John Lovegren in 1905, and a post office was established in 1910, which operated until its closure in 1943.

A lumber mill once existed at High Point, which employed 52 workers in 1913. Many of the state-owned timberlands near High Point continue to produce logs for mills elsewhere to this day, while also being open for recreational use.

== Modern day ==
High Point was the location of Tent City 4 beginning in early 2016, while the camp was awaiting a permit to move to Bellevue. Today, High Point consists of a small collection of houses, Tiger Mountain State Forest access roads, and a Tiger Mountain trailhead at a minor exit on Interstate 90 east of Issaquah. This trailhead includes access to the popular Tradition Lake loop.
