= Camp High Point =

Defunct summer camp in New York, US

Camp emblem

Infirmary and totem pole, circa 1964

Camp High Point was an eight-week-long summer camp on Route 28A in West Shokan (Ulster County), New York. Located at the foot of Mt. High Point, on the shores of the Ashokan Reservoir, Camp High Point was a 150-acre (0.61 km^{2}) coeducational camp. It consisted of two separate campuses and a central area for administration, dining, medical, and social facilities. It also featured a large (325 ft. x 110 ft.) natural mountain-fed swimming pool. The camp colors were green and white.

== History ==
Boys' campus, circa 1964

Boys' campus, 2004

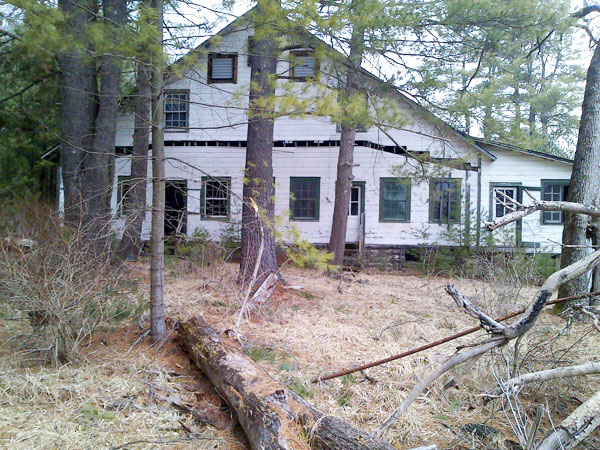
Dining Hall, 2013

Camp High Point was established in 1923 by the Levy and Greenberg families. The Sonnenreichs, who began their association with the camp in 1931, owned and operated it from 1945 until 1970, its final season. The camp was both traditional and progressive. Traditional, because (for its time) it encompassed just about every sport and activity to which a camper should be exposed. Progressive, because it was the Sonnenreichs' philosophy to provide a vacation place in which children had the opportunity to express themselves in just about any way that motivated them.

The Sonnenreichs also fostered cultural diversity at camp by hiring counselors from England, Scotland, and Germany, and by participating in the Experiment in International Living program during the 1969 camp season.

One of the most recognizable High Point campers was Peter Falk, who made his first stage appearance at camp, at the age of 12. He recalled his experiences at camp in a TV Guide article, published in 1972.

== Camp today ==
Unused for over 56 years, the camp is now in varying stages of decay. As of March 2013, most of the bunks and other sites on girls' campus either were in ruins or completely gone. The entire area sat in knee-high grasses, weeds, and other overgrowth. What was once a large, open space was a forest of pine trees. Boys' campus fared somewhat better, since it was maintained for several years for group rentals. The central-area buildings, including the dining hall, infirmary, and social hall, were still standing.

Rather than sell it for development, the current owners have chosen to let the property return to its natural state.

== Notable attendees ==
- Peter Falk
- Ross Martin
- Lynn Rogoff
- Peter Lefcourt
- Michael Sonnenreich
