= KwaDuma =

- Location within Lesotho

Highest point
- Elevation: 3,019 m (9,905 ft)
- Coordinates: 30°28′0″S 28°9′25″E

Geography
- Location: Quthing District, Lesotho / Eastern Cape, South Africa
- Parent range: Drakensberg
- Topo map: CD:NGI 3028AC

KwaDuma is a peak in the Drakensberg mountains on the border between Lesotho and South Africa. At a height of 3,019 metres (9,905 ft), it is the highest peak in South Africa's Eastern Cape province. (Ben Macdhui is the highest peak in the Eastern Cape that does not lie on the border.)
