= Arthur Marshall (footballer) =

English footballer

Arthur George Marshall (born October 1881) was an English footballer. His regular position was at full back. He was born in Liverpool. He played for Manchester United, Everton, Chester City, Crewe Alexandra, Stockport County, Portsmouth, and Leicester Fosse.
