= Arthur George Marshall =

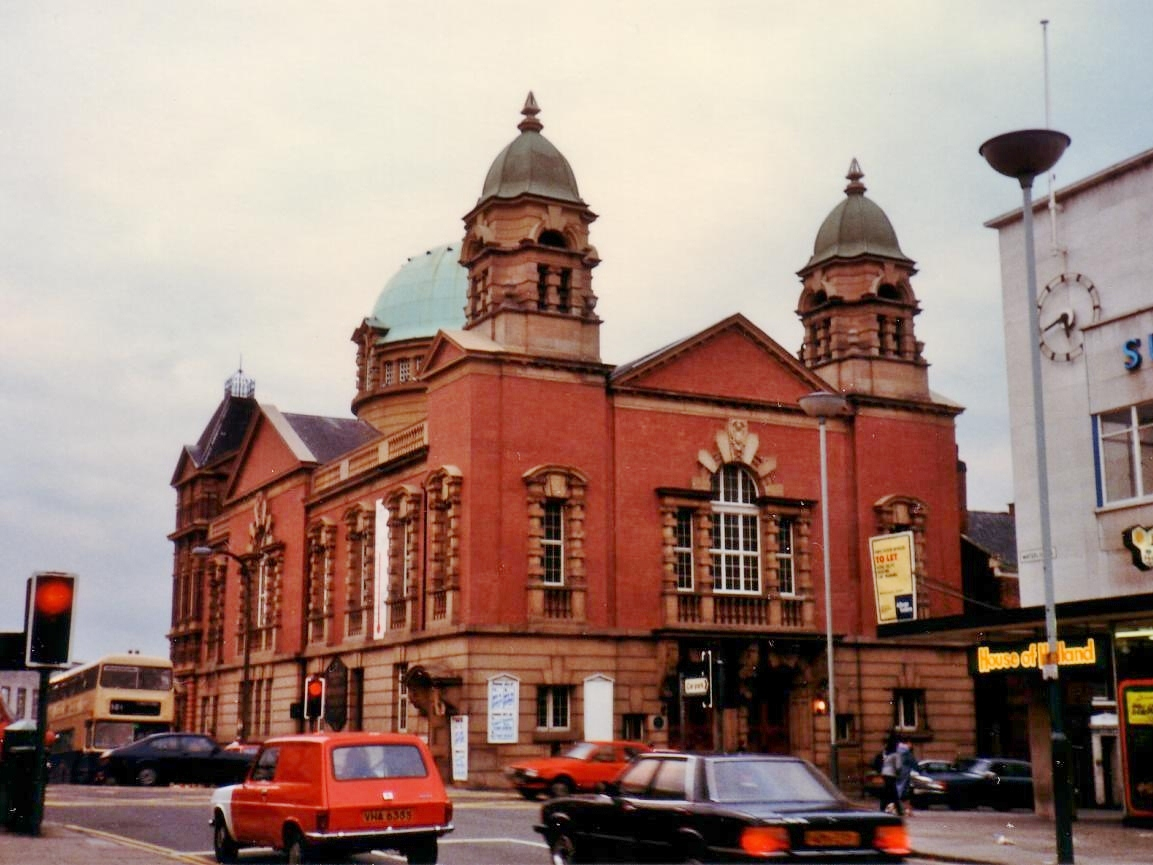
Wesleyan Methodist Church, Darlington Street, Wolverhampton 1900-01

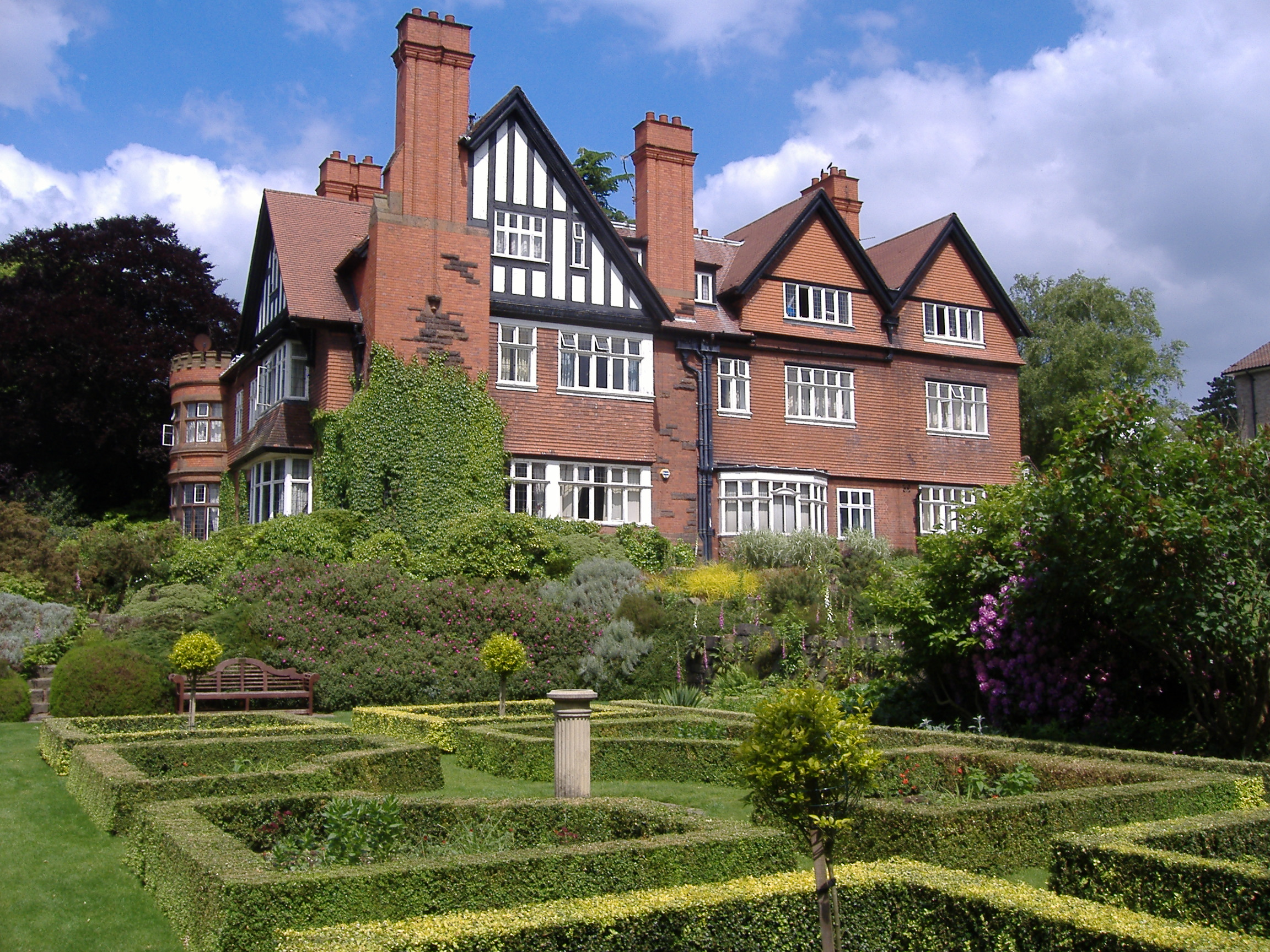
Lenton Hurst, University of Nottingham 1900

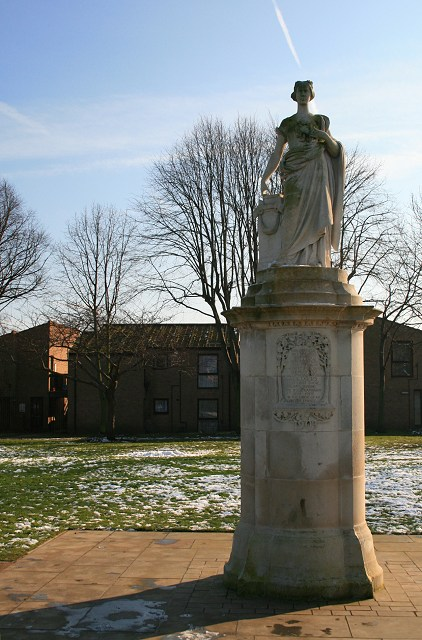
Boer War memorial "Hope" in Beeston, Nottinghamshire 1903

Arthur George Marshall (23 December 1858 – 25 February 1915) ARIBA was an architect based in Nottingham from 1881.

== History ==
He was born in Nottingham on 23 December 1858, the son of James Matthew Marshall, a well-known local decorator, carver and gilder. He was educated in Brunswick House Collegiate School, Hammersmith, London, and then articled to Samuel Dutton Walker in Nottingham from 1873 to 1878, and in 1881 set himself up in independent practice with offices in King Street. Around 1891 he entered a partnership with George Turner, an association which lasted for about 8 years.

He became an Associate of the Royal Institute of British Architects on 9 January 1882.

He married Hilda Maud at St Andrew’s Church, Westminster in June 1903. In 1908 she sued for divorce, citing cruelty and misconduct.

== Works ==
- Clipstone Wesleyan Methodist Church 1882-83
- Lenton Wesleyan Methodist Church 1882
- Free Methodist Church, Mansfield Woodhouse 1883-84
- Brightlands, Clumber Road East, The Park Estate, Nottingham 1885(now renamed Adam House)
- Women’s Hospital, Sandfield House, Raleigh Street, Nottingham 1885-86
- Forest Lodge, Sherwood Rise, Nottingham
- Russell Chambers, King Street, Nottingham 1895-96
- Bagthorpe Workhouse 1896-1903 (now within the Nottingham City Hospital complex)
- Lenton Hurst, University of Nottingham 1900 (now part of Lenton Hall)
- Workhouse, New Cross, Wednesfield 1900-01
- Wesleyan Methodist Church, Darlington Street, Wolverhampton 1900-01
- Bagthorpe Workhouse Chapel 1903 Afterwards the Hospital Church of St Luke at City Hospital (now storeroom)
- Hope Boer War Memorial, Beeston 1903
- Hawtonville Hospital, Newark 1905
- Eye Hospital, Ropewalk, Nottingham 1910 now apartments
- 32 Upper Parliament Street, Nottingham 1913-14

== Publications ==
- Specimens of Antique Carved Furniture and Woodwork Measured and Drawn 1888
