= Arthur H. Marshall =

First person to successfully reach the highest point in every U.S. state

- Born: 1885/1886
- Died: February 9, 1951 (aged 65)
- Known for: Being the first to summit the highest point in each U.S. State (48 at the time of completion), finishing in 1936

Arthur Harmon Marshall (1885/1886 – February 9, 1951) was the first person to successfully reach the highest point in every U.S. state, of which there were 48 at the time of completion.

== Climbing career ==
Marshall's first state high point was Mount Rainier of Washington, which he climbed in 1919. Marshall climbed his last state high point, Indiana's, in July 1936. Due to limited data of the era, over ten of the highest points he visited are no longer considered to be the high points of those states. Nevertheless, Marshall is still considered the first completer of the list.

As a lifelong bachelor, Marshall was able to find the time to travel to state high points. He worked for the railway and did not drive, and would thus reach each point by travelling at a discount by railway to the nearest station, then hiring a driver to take him as close as possible via roadway. Marshall lived in a hotel while traveling.

In 1936, after completing his initial goal of reaching the highest point in each of the 48 U.S. States, Marshall travelled back to Arkansas as there were two high points of equal elevation, of which he had previously only summited one. To reach the second point, he walked for hours through the woods in a heat wave, and took refuge in a backwoods cabin.

== Death ==
Marshall died of suicide on February 9, 1951 at the age of 65.
