= Arthur Marshall (Mississippi politician) =

American politician

Member of the Mississippi State Senate for Sunflower County
- In office 1924–1926

Personal details
- Born: January 19, 1862 Cumberland County, Virginia
- Died: January 29, 1946 (aged 84)
- Spouse: Sallie A. Davidson Marshall
- Occupation: police officer, plantation owner

Arthur Leroy Marshall (January 19, 1862-January 29, 1946) was a plantation owner and state legislator in Mississippi. He represented Sunflower County in the Mississippi State Senate from 1924 to 1926. He helped establish Delta State Teachers College in Cleveland, Mississippi.

== Biography ==
Marshall was born January 19, 1862 near Ruleville Sunflower County, Mississippi to Berry Stowers Marshall and Louisa Georgia Marshall (née McKinsey). He went to McNutt, Mississippi high school and then studied engineering and law.

He was made a special police officer designated to deal with a group of outlaws in the Mississippi Delta.

His political career started as a delegate to the San Francisco Democratic National Convention in 1920 and he was made a Presidential elector in the 1924 United States presidential election.

Marshall announced that he was standing for the Sunflower County seat in the state senate March 1923 and was expected to have no opposition. He was elected to the Mississippi State Senate in 1923, and served from 1924 to 1926.

He married Sallie A. Davidson Marshall May 4 1890 and they had four children together.

Marshall died January 29, 1946.

== See also ==
- List of former members of the Mississippi State Senate
