= Highpointing =

Sport of visiting the point with the highest elevation within some area

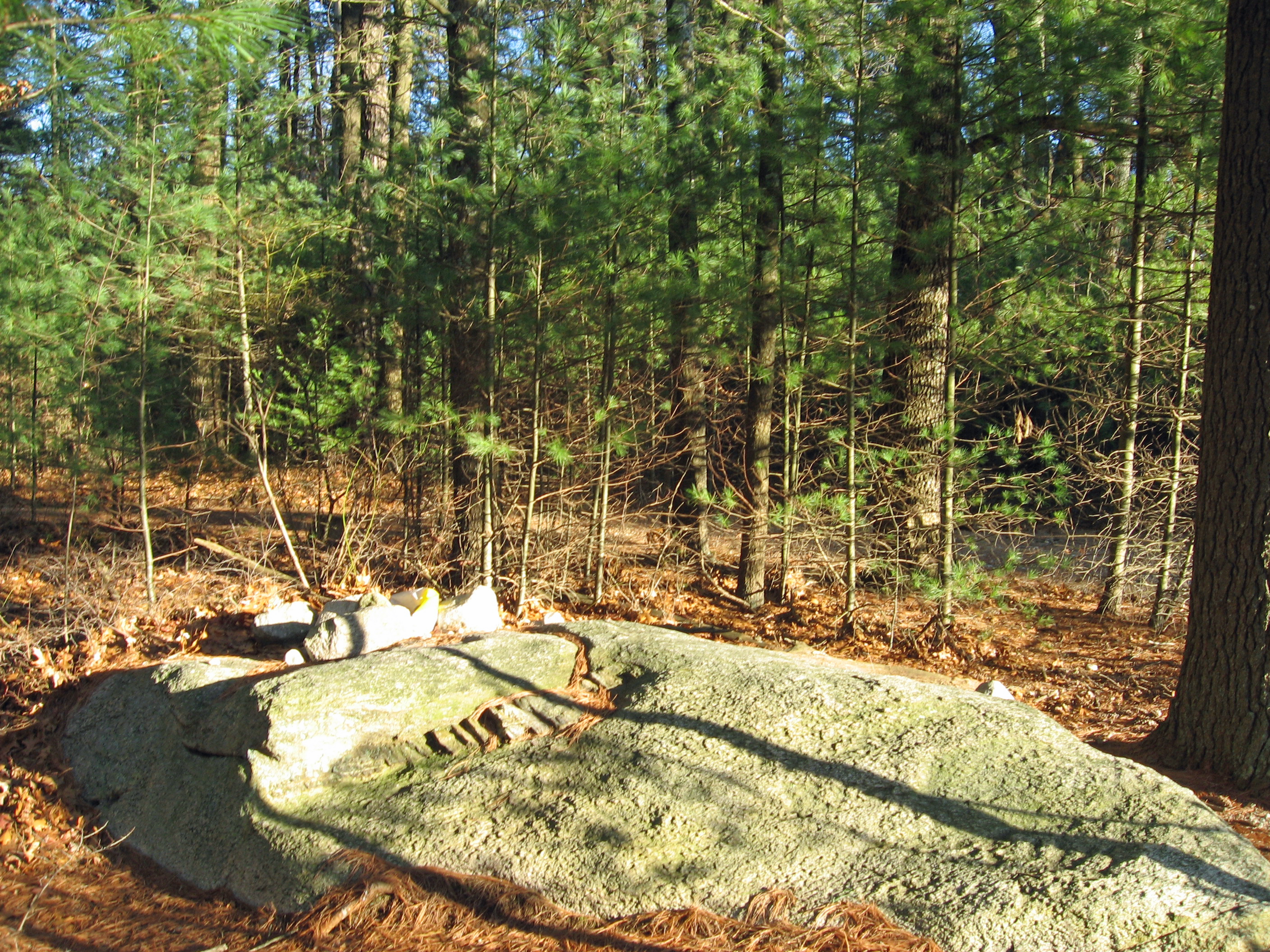
- Jerimoth Hill, the highest natural point of elevation in the U.S. state of Rhode Island.

Characteristics
- Type: Recreational activity

Presence
- Country or region: Worldwide, most popular in the United States

Highpointing is the activity of ascending to the point with the highest natural elevation within a given area, known as the highpoint. Those who pursue the activity are known as highpointers.

Highpointing has been considered a subset of peak bagging, the goal of which is to reach the summit of every mountain on a certain list.

== History and background ==
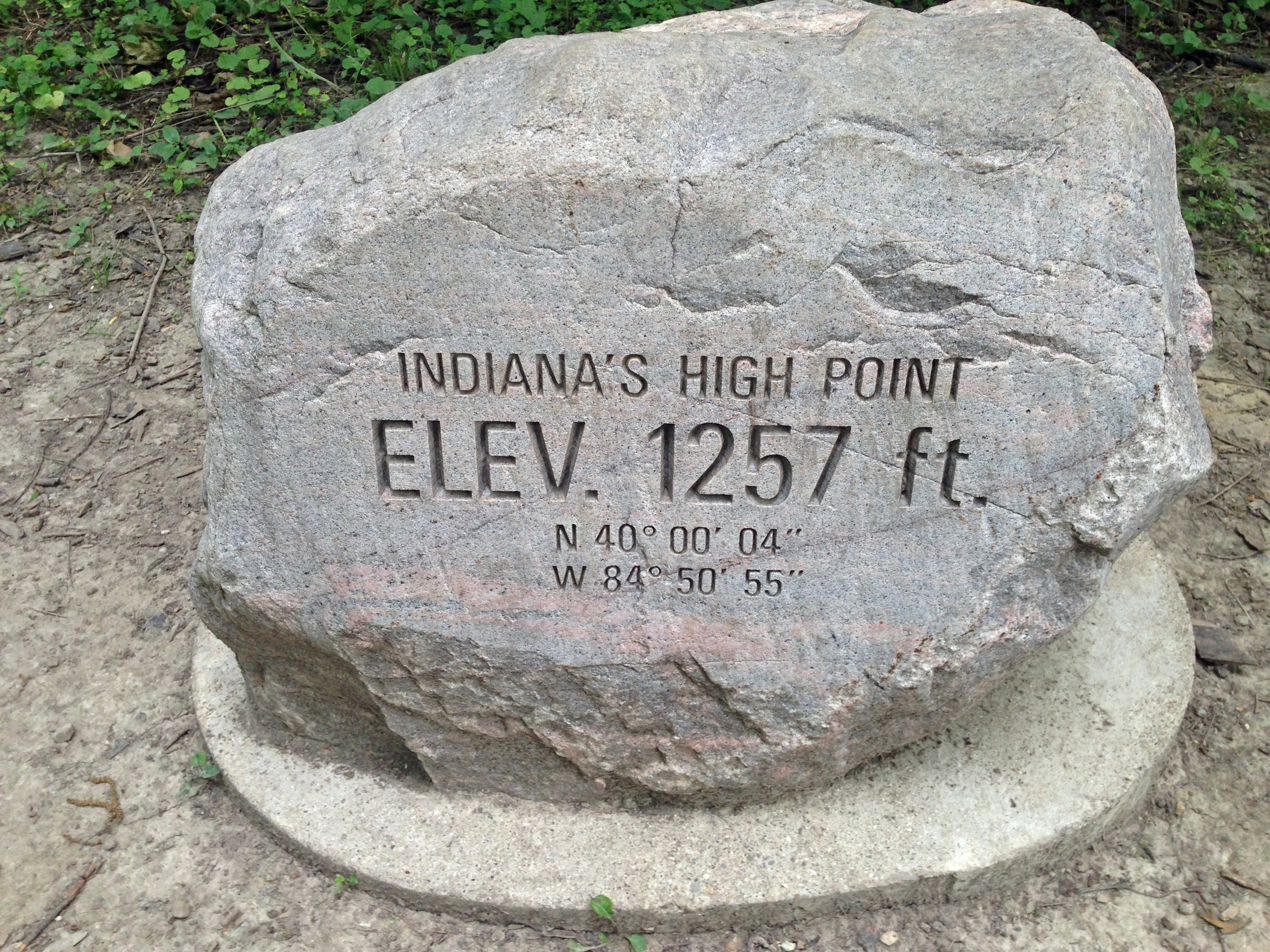
Hoosier Hill, Indiana

Highpointing has its roots in the United States. Starting in the early 20th century, a few pioneers of highpointing began visiting the highest natural point in each of the 50 U.S. states. In the early days, this endeavor involved dispute and original research, as the tools to precisely map the country were just beginning to find widespread use. The first person to successfully climb each U.S. state highpoint was Arthur H. Marshall, who finished in July 1936, on Indiana's Hoosier Hill, when there were only 48 states. Vin Hoeman was the first person to climb the highest point in all 50 U.S. states, finishing in 1966.

Today, U.S. state highpointing appeals to a wide range of individuals, from families to mountaineers. Not all highpointers have the goal of completing the entire list, instead choosing to pursue the activity to see different parts of the country. Highpointers often take road trips to climb multiple high points in an outing.

According to the Highpointers' Club, founded in 1988, the activity has a following of more than 10,000 people. Over 300 people have been recorded to have summited the highest elevation in each U.S. state, with roughly ten people per year. U.S. state highpoints range in difficulty from nondescript flat points accessible by road, to moderate, hilly hikes, to glaciated mountains requiring specialized skills.

Some highpointers extend the fifty U.S. state high points to include the highest point in the District of Columbia and the five U.S. territories. John Michler and Reid Larson became the first two people to climb the territory highpoints in addition to the state highpoints, finishing in 2018 on Agrihan, Northern Mariana Islands.

== Speed records ==
In 1991, a team consisting of Pete Allard, Jim Grace, Shaun Lacher, David Sandway and Dennis Stewart, who called themselves "The Highpoint Hoppers," set the first recognized record for climbing the highest point in each of the lower contiguous states in the fastest time. The team began on the summit of Mount Rainier in Washington at midnight on July 1 and finished on the summit of Gannett Peak in Wyoming on July 31, thus completing their goal of ascending all 48 state highpoints in one calendar month. Their time was 30 days, 10 hours and 52 minutes. For their effort, the Highpoint Hoppers got recognition in the Guinness Book of Records.

Fifteen years later, British climber Jake Meyer broke the speed record for climbing the lower 48 highpoints in 23 days, 19 hours and 31 minutes in 2006. The record stood until American siblings Josh and Lindsay Sanders broke the record in 19 days, 7 hours and 37 minutes in 2015.

In 2018, Colin O'Brady broke the speed record for climbing all 50 state highpoints, finishing in 21 days. The previous record was 41 days, set in 2016.

== Other forms of highpointing ==
The Seven Summits, or the highest mountain on each continent, is a popular form of highpointing.

Some highpointers pursue the highest points of U.S. counties, often choosing to focus on a specific state or group of states.

Climbs to the highest points of states, provinces, or territories in countries such as Canada, Australia, Germany, among others, has been recorded in addition to the U.S. states and territories. Len Vanderstar became the first Canadian to reach the highest point in each of the country's provinces and territories, finishing in 2017 on Barbeau Peak, Nunavut.

No person has climbed the highest point in every country in the world. Ginge Fullen has climbed 174 country highpoints, the most of anyone in the world. Fullen was the first person to climb the highest point in each of the 47 countries of Europe, along with the fastest to climb Africa's 53 country highpoints, done prior to the separation of South Sudan. Francis Tapon has climbed 50 of the 54 African country highpoints.

== See also ==
- Peak bagging
- Geocaching
- Lists of highest points
- List of countries whose highest point is not on the mainland
