= Municipalities of Equatorial Guinea =

Equatorial Guinea is a unitary republic located on the west coast of Africa which is divided into eight provinces, 19 districts (distritos) and 32 municipalities (municipios). These are organized as shown in the following table. Municipalities that are the capitals of their respective provinces are shown in bold.

== List of Municipalities ==
A clickable map of Equatorial Guinea exhibiting its two regions and eight provinces. The island nation of São Tomé and Príncipe is not part of Equatorial Guinea.

Districts and municipalities of Equatorial Guinea, grouped by province (Note: Capital cities are marked in bold.)
Provinces	Districts	Municipalities
Annobón	San Antonio de Palé	**San Antonio de Palé**
Bioko Norte	Malabo	**Malabo**
Bioko Norte	Baney	Baney
Bioko Norte	Baney	**Rebola**
Bioko Sur	Luba	Batete
Bioko Sur	Luba	**Luba**
Bioko Sur	Luba	Moka
Bioko Sur	Riaba	Riaba
Centro Sur	Akurenam	Akurenam
Centro Sur	Evinayong	Bicurga
Centro Sur	Evinayong	**Evinayong**
Centro Sur	Evinayong	Teguete
Centro Sur	Niefang	Niefang
Centro Sur	Niefang	Nkimi
Centro Sur	Niefang	Nkumekien
Djibloho	Djibloho	Djibloho
Djibloho	Djibloho	**Ciudad de la Paz** (Capital of Equatorial Guinea)
Djibloho	Mbere	Mbere
Kié-Ntem	Ebebiyín	Bidjabidján
Kié-Ntem	Ebebiyín	**Ebebiyín**
Kié-Ntem	Micomeseng	Micomeseng
Kié-Ntem	Micomeseng	Ncue
Kié-Ntem	Micomeseng	Nsang
Kié-Ntem	Nsok-Nsomo	Nsok-Nsomo
Litoral	Bata	**Bata**
Litoral	Bata	Machinda
Litoral	Bata	Río Campo
Litoral	Mbini	Bitica
Litoral	Mbini	Mbini
Litoral	Cogo	Cabo San Juan
Litoral	Cogo	Cogo
Litoral	Cogo	Corisco
Wele-Nzas	Aconibe	Aconibe
Wele-Nzas	Añisok	Añisok
Wele-Nzas	Añisok	Ayene
Wele-Nzas	Mongomo	Mengomeyén
Wele-Nzas	Mongomo	**Mongomo**
Wele-Nzas	Mongomo	Nzangayong
Wele-Nzas	Nsork	Nsork

== See also ==
- List of cities in Equatorial Guinea
- Provinces of Equatorial Guinea
- Subdivisions of Equatorial Guinea
