= Subdivisions of Equatorial Guinea =

According to Article 3 of the Constitution of Equatorial Guinea, the country is divided for administrative and economic purposes into regions, provinces, districts, and municipalities. In practice, the provinces serve as the first-level administrative divisions. Municipalities are subdivided into village councils and neighbourhood communities. Many of the sub-municipal entities are grouped into urban districts, which remain subordinate to municipalities and are distinct from districts proper.

== Regions ==
Equatorial Guinea is divided into a continental region known as Río Muni, and an insular region comprising Bioko, Annobón, Corisco, Elobey Grande, Elobey Chico, Mbañe, Conga, Leva, Cocoteros and other smaller islets. The islets of Mbañe, Conga, and Cocoteros were subject to a territorial dispute with Gabon until 2025, when the International Court of Justice ruled in favour of Equatorial Guinea.

== Provinces ==
A clickable map of Equatorial Guinea exhibiting its two regions and eight provinces. The island nation of São Tomé and Príncipe is not part of Equatorial Guinea.

Equatorial Guinea is divided into eight provinces (capitals appear in parentheses):

1. Annobón (San Antonio de Palé)
2. Bioko Norte (Malabo)
3. Bioko Sur (Luba)
4. Centro Sur (Evinayong)
5. Djibloho (Ciudad de la Paz)
6. Kié-Ntem (Ebebiyín)
7. Litoral (Bata)
8. Wele-Nzas (Mongomo)

The provinces are further divided into 19 districts and 37 municipalities.

== Districts and municipalities ==
The 19 districts and 37 municipalities of Equatorial Guinea are organized as shown in the following table. Municipalities that are the capitals of their respective provinces are shown in bold.

Districts and municipalities of Equatorial Guinea, grouped by province
Provinces	Population			Area	Districts	Population		Municipalities	Population
Provinces	1994	2001	2015	Area	Districts	1994	2001	Municipalities	2001
Annobón	2,820	5,008	5,314	17	San Antonio de Palé	2,820	5,008	**San Antonio de Palé**	5008
Bioko Norte	75,137	231,428	300,374	776	Malabo	64,439	211,276	**Malabo**	211,276
Bioko Norte	75,137	231,428	300,374	776	Baney	10,698	20,152	Baney	11,893
Bioko Norte	75,137	231,428	300,374	776	Baney	10,698	20,152	Rebola	8,259
Bioko Sur	12,469	29,034	34,674	1,241	Luba	9,242	23,870	**Luba**	23,870
Bioko Sur	12,469	29,034	34,674	1,241	Riaba	3,327	5,164	Riaba	5,164
Centro Sur	60,341	120,856	141,986	9,931	Akurenam	11,631	20,255	Akurenam	20,255
Centro Sur	60,341	120,856	141,986	9,931	Evinayong	21,353	46,867	Bicurga	15,346
Centro Sur	60,341	120,856	141,986	9,931	Evinayong	21,353	46,867	**Evinayong**	31,521
Centro Sur	60,341	120,856	141,986	9,931	Niefang	27,357	53,734	Niefang	37,273
Centro Sur	60,341	120,856	141,986	9,931	Niefang	27,357	53,734	Nkimi	16,461
Kié-Ntem	92,779	167,279	183,664	3,943	Ebebiyín	45,557	88,891	Bidjabidján	28,144
Kié-Ntem	92,779	167,279	183,664	3,943	Ebebiyín	45,557	88,891	**Ebebiyín**	60,747
Kié-Ntem	92,779	167,279	183,664	3,943	Micomeseng	29,953	45,409	Micomeseng	20,226
Kié-Ntem	92,779	167,279	183,664	3,943	Micomeseng	29,953	45,409	Ncue	14,955
Kié-Ntem	92,779	167,279	183,664	3,943	Micomeseng	29,953	45,409	Nsang	10,228
Kié-Ntem	92,779	167,279	183,664	3,943	Nsok-Nsomo	17,269	32,979	Nsok-Nsomo	32,979
Litoral	100,047	298,414	367,348	6,665	Bata	71,406	244,264	**Bata**	230,282
Litoral	100,047	298,414	367,348	6,665	Bata	71,406	244,264	Machinda	9,387
Litoral	100,047	298,414	367,348	6,665	Bata	71,406	244,264	Río Campo	4,595
Litoral	100,047	298,414	367,348	6,665	Mbini	14,034	28,586	Bitica	8,291
Litoral	100,047	298,414	367,348	6,665	Mbini	14,034	28,586	Mbini	20,295
Litoral	100,047	298,414	367,348	6,665	Cogo	14,607	25,564	Cogo	23,121
Litoral	100,047	298,414	367,348	6,665	Cogo	14,607	25,564	Corisco	2,443
Wele-Nzas	62,458	157,980	192,017	5,478	Aconibe	9,065	20,105	Aconibe	20,105
Wele-Nzas	62,458	157,980	192,017	5,478	Añisok	22,613	52,684	Añisok	40,395
Wele-Nzas	62,458	157,980	192,017	5,478	Añisok	22,613	52,684	Ayene	12,289
Wele-Nzas	62,458	157,980	192,017	5,478	Mongomo	23,756	69,154	Mengomeyén	15,644
Wele-Nzas	62,458	157,980	192,017	5,478	Mongomo	23,756	69,154	**Mongomo**	53,510
Wele-Nzas	62,458	157,980	192,017	5,478	Nsork	7,024	16,037	Nsork	16,037

== Sub-municipal local government ==
Below the municipalities are further entities of local government, called village councils (consejos de poblados) in rural areas and neighbourhood communities (comunidades de vecinos) in urban areas. According to a 2013 United Nations report, there were 716 village councils and 344 neighbourhood communities in Equatorial Guinea.

Neighbourhood communities in the urban areas of Malabo and Bata are grouped into urban districts (distritos urbanos), five in each city. These urban districts are subordinate to municipalities and are thus different from districts proper which lie above the municipal level of government.

In 2017, Equatorial Guinea created three new urban districts from various village councils and neighbourhood communities in every district proper (including Bata and Malabo, which now have eight urban districts each) except for Annobón and Djibloho, which each saw the creation of two urban districts. Thus there are now a total of 65 urban districts in Equatorial Guinea.

== See also ==
- List of cities in Equatorial Guinea
- Municipalities of Equatorial Guinea
- Provinces of Equatorial Guinea
