= List of cities in Equatorial Guinea =

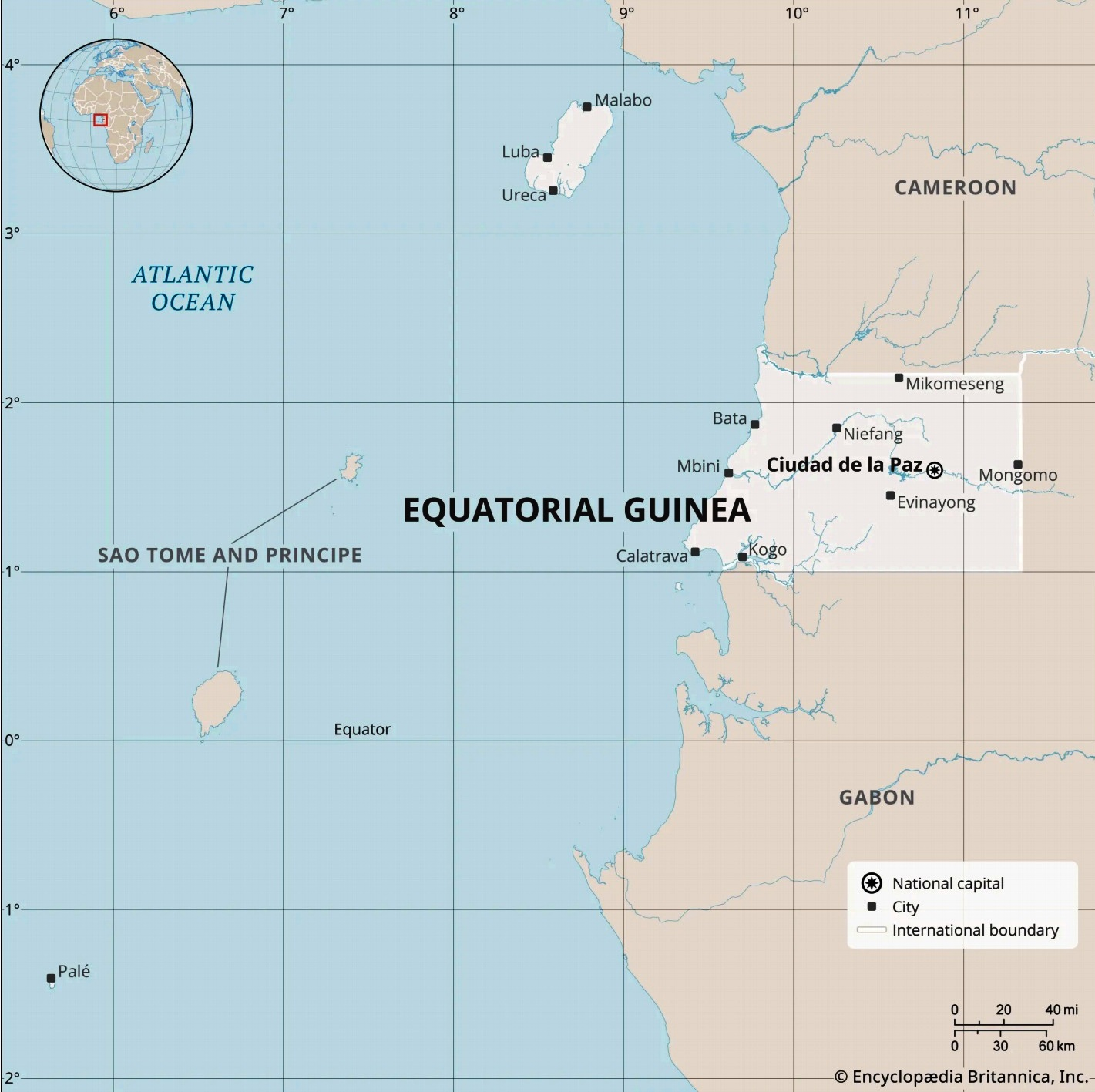
Map of Equatorial Guinea in 2026

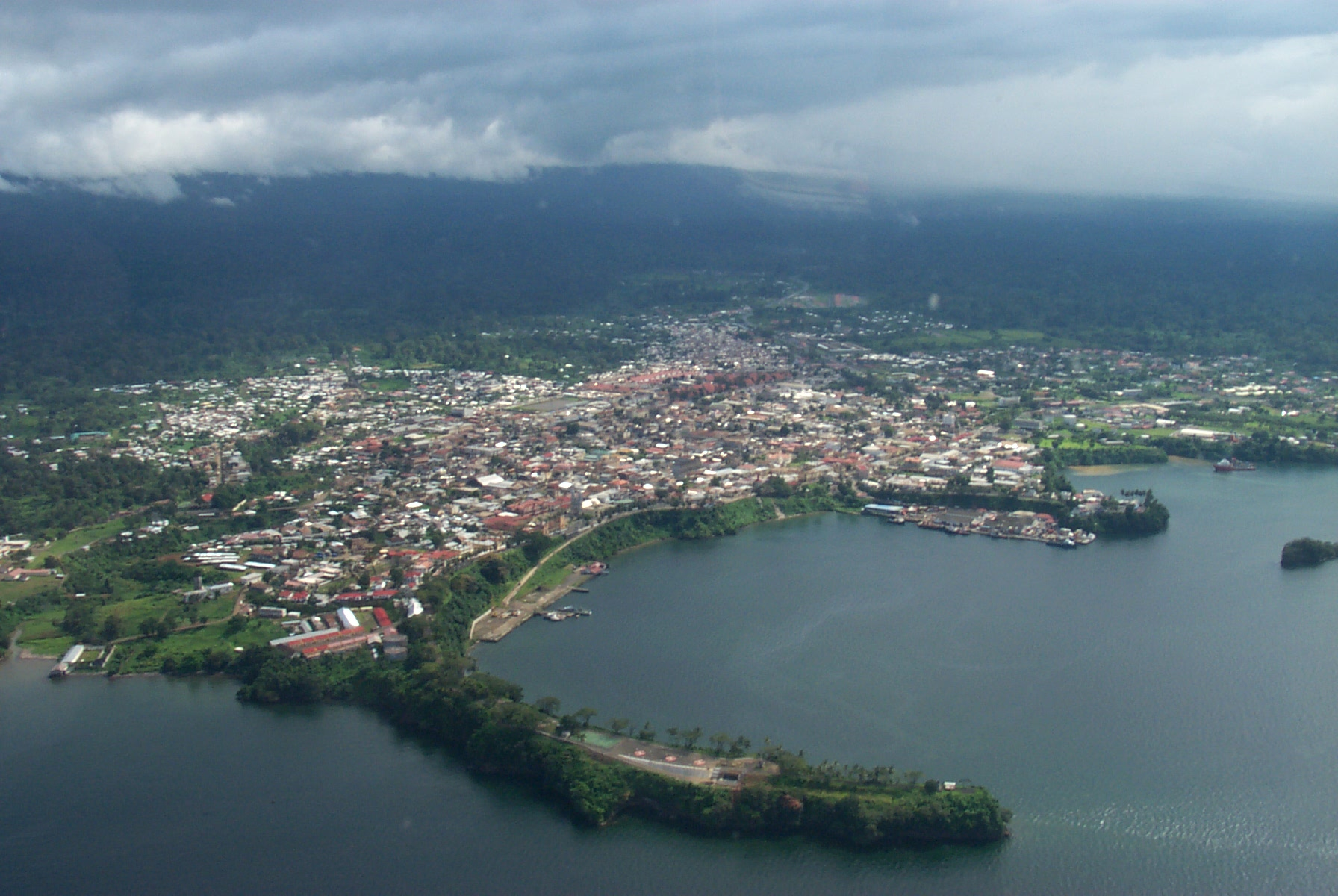
Malabo, former Capital of Equatorial Guinea

Bata

This is a list of cities in Equatorial Guinea, arranged by population. It includes all settlements with a population over 1,000.

== List ==
Cities in Equatorial Guinea
Rank	City	Population			Province
Rank	City	1983 Census	2001 Census	2005 estimate	Province
1	Bata	24,390	132,235	173,046	Litoral
2	Malabo	31,650	132,440	155,963	Bioko Norte
3	Ebebiyín	3,540	19,515	24,831	Kié-Ntem
4	Aconibe	1,700	8,795	11,192	Wele-Nzas
5	Añisoc	1,100	7,586	10,191	Wele-Nzas
6	Luba	2,450	9,011	8,655	Bioko Sur
7	Evinayong	3,170	7,997	8,462	Centro Sur
8	Mongomo	2,370	5,791	6,393	Wele-Nzas
9	Mengomeyén	N/A	5,294	5,947	Wele-Nzas
10	Micomeseng	1,300	5,327	5,813	Kié-Ntem
11	Rebola	N/A	5,445	5,450	Bioko Norte
12	Bidjabidjan	N/A	5,167	4,998	Kié-Ntem
13	Niefang	1,200	4,292	4,858	Centro Sur
14	Cogo	N/A	3,952	4,693	Litoral
15	Nsok	500	3,929	4,620	Kié-Ntem
16	San Antonio de Palé	910	5,008	4,433	Annobón
17	Mbini	1,229	3,421	4,062	Litoral
18	Nsork	N/A	3,355	3,769	Wele-Nzas
19	Ayene	N/A	3,099	3,482	Wele-Nzas
20	Nkimi	N/A	3,217	3,313	Centro Sur
21	Machinda	N/A	2,440	2,897	Litoral
22	Acurenam	1,500	2,748	2,736	Centro Sur
23	Corisco	N/A	2,140	2,541	Litoral
24	Baney	N/A	2,363	2,365	Bioko Norte
25	Bicurga	N/A	2,251	2,318	Centro Sur
26	Nsang	N/A	2,194	2,122	Kié-Ntem
27	San Francisco Javier de Nkué	N/A	1,740	1,683	Kié-Ntem
28	Bitica	N/A	1,233	1,464	Litoral
29	Río Campo	N/A	931	1,105	Litoral
30	Riaba	200	1,086	1,071	Bioko Sur

=== Other towns and villages ===
- Acalayong
- Bolondo
- Moca
- Ciudad de la Paz, the current capital of Equatorial Guinea.
- San Antonio de Palé
