= List of football clubs in Equatorial Guinea =

This is a non-exhaustive list of football clubs in Equatorial Guinea, which is ordered according to the division they played in during the 2014 season.

For a complete list see Category:Football clubs in Equatorial Guinea

== Equatoguinean Primera División (2014) ==
=== Región Continental ===
Club	City	Province	Stadium
AD Mongomo	Mongomo	Wele-Nzas	
Águilas Verdes de Guadalupe	Bata	Litoral	
Akonangui FC	Ebibeyin	Kié-Ntem	Manuel Enguru
Campo Amor FC			
Deportivo Mongomo	Mongomo	Wele-Nzas	La Libertad
Dragón	Bata	Litoral	La Libertad
Mesi Nkulu	Ebibeyin	Kié-Ntem	Manuel Enguru
Nsok Nsomo	Nsok	Wele-Nzas	
Quince de Agosto			
Racing de Micomeseng	Micomeseng	Kié-Ntem	
Real Sanidad	Evinayong	Centro Sur	
Robella Inter			

=== Región Insular ===
Club	City	Province	Stadium
Ateneo			
Atlético Malabo	Malabo	Bioko Norte	Estadio de Malabo
Atlético Semu	Malabo	Bioko Norte	Estadio de Malabo
Deportivo Ebenezer	Luba	Bioko Sur	Estadio de Luba
CD Unidad Malabo	Malabo	Bioko Norte	Estadio de Malabo
Inter Junior			
Leones Vegetarianos	Malabo	Bioko Norte	Estadio de Malabo
Real X			
San Pablo de Nsork	Nsork	Wele-Nzas	La Paz
Santa Rosa	Malabo	Bioko Norte	La Paz
Sony de Elá Nguema	Malabo	Bioko Norte	Estadio de Malabo
The Panthers	Malabo	Bioko Norte	Estadio de Malabo

== Segunda División (2014) ==
=== Group A ===
Club	City	Province	Stadium
Anastasia			
Atlético Malabo B	Malabo	Bioko Norte	Estadio de Malabo
Deportivo Duma Duma			
Leones Vegetarianos B	Malabo	Bioko Norte	Estadio de Malabo
Leving Stong			
Lombé	Luba	Bioko Sur	
Real Teka			

=== Group B ===
Club	City	Province	Stadium
Estrella Roja			
Once Esperanzas			
Real Basakato	Basacato del Este	Bioko Norte	
Real Castel	Mongomo	Wele-Nzas	
Real Felixtel			
Real Rebola	Rebola	Bioko Norte	
Real Villa			
Recreativo Lamper			
San Kuma Sport			
Santa Isabel			

== Women's clubs ==
- Malabo Kings F.C.

== Rest of the Country ==
=== Disbanded or not currently playing ===
- Café Band Sportif
- Renacimiento
