= ISO 3166-2:GQ =

Entry for Equatorial Guinea in ISO 3166-2

ISO 3166-2:GQ is the entry for Equatorial Guinea in ISO 3166-2, part of the ISO 3166 standard published by the International Organization for Standardization (ISO), which defines codes for the names of the principal subdivisions (e.g., provinces or states) of all countries coded in ISO 3166-1.

Currently for Equatorial Guinea, ISO 3166-2 codes are defined for two levels of subdivisions:

- two regions (i.e., the Continental Region and the Insular Region)
- eight provinces

Each code consists of two parts, separated by a hyphen. The first part is GQ, the ISO 3166-1 alpha-2 code of Equatorial Guinea. The second part is either of the following:

- one letter: regions
- two letters: provinces

== Current codes ==
Subdivision names are listed as in the ISO 3166-2 standard published by the ISO 3166 Maintenance Agency (ISO 3166/MA).

ISO 639-1 codes are used to represent subdivision names in the following administrative languages:

- (es): Spanish
- (fr): French
- (pt): Portuguese

Click on the button in the header to sort each column.

=== Regions ===
Code	Subdivision name (es)	Subdivision name (fr)	Subdivision name (pt)	Subdivision name (en) (Note: For reference only, English name not included in the ISO 3166-2 standard.)
GQ-C	Región Continental	Région Continentale	Região Continental	Continental
GQ-I	Región Insular	Région Insulaire	Região Insular	Insular

=== Provinces ===
Code	Subdivision name (es)	Subdivision name (fr)	Subdivision name (pt)	Subdivision name (en)	Region
GQ-AN	Annobón	Annobon	Ano Bom	Annobon	I
GQ-BN	Bioko Norte	Bioko Nord	Bioko Norte	North Bioko	I
GQ-BS	Bioko Sur	Bioko Sud	Bioko Sul	South Bioko	I
GQ-CS	Centro Sur	Centro Sud	Centro Sul	South Center	C
GQ-DJ	Djibloho	Djibloho	Djibloho	Djibloho	C
GQ-KN	Kié-Ntem	Kié-Ntem	Kié-Ntem	Kie-Ntem	C
GQ-LI	Litoral	Littoral	Litoral	Coast	C
GQ-WN	Wele-Nzas	Wele-Nzas	Wele-Nzas	Wele-Nzas	C

== Changes ==
The following changes to the entry have been announced in newsletters by the ISO 3166/MA since the first publication of ISO 3166-2 in 1998:

Newsletter	Date issued	Description of change in newsletter
Newsletter II-3	2011-12-13 (corrected 2011-12-15)	Language adjustment, typo correction, first level prefix addition and source list update.
Online Browsing Platform (OBP)	2020-11-24	Addition of province GQ-DJ; Update List Source

== See also ==
- Subdivisions of Equatorial Guinea
- FIPS region codes of Equatorial Guinea
- Neighbouring countries: CM, GA
