= List of provinces of Equatorial Guinea by Human Development Index =

This is a list of provinces of Equatorial Guinea by Human Development Index as of 2023.

Rank	Province	HDI (2023)
High human development
1	Annobón, Bioko Norte, Bioko Sur	0.761
2	Litoral	0.703
Medium human development
–	Equatorial Guinea (average)	0.674
3	Kié-Ntem	0.627
4	Centro Sur	0.619
5	Wele-Nzas	0.598

== See also ==
- List of countries by Human Development Index
