= Vehicle registration plates of Equatorial Guinea =

Equatorial Guinea
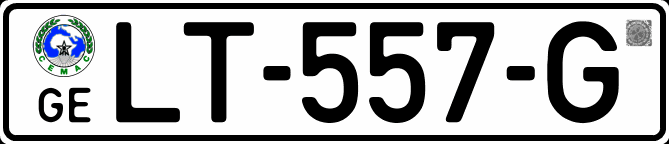
- Equatoguinean regular legal standard number plate.
- Country: Equatorial Guinea
- Country code: None (unofficially using Georgia's code, GE)

Current series
- Size: 520 mm × 110 mm 20.5 in × 4.3 in
- Serial format: AB-123-C (AB being the regional code)
- Colour (front): Black on white
- Colour (rear): Black on white

Vehicle registration plates of Equatorial Guinea is a legal form requiring the citizens of Equatorial Guinea to have the car registered.

The license plates of Equatorial Guinea, like the former Spanish colony, are built on the Spanish principle and have the format "AB-123-C". The prefix "AB" means the region, "123" - the number, the suffix "С" - the series. The license plates have European shapes and sizes. Regular plates have a white background with black marks. Since 2009, on the left side of the plates is the logo of the Economic Community of Central African States and the unofficial reduction of "GE".

== Provinces ==
- AN - Annobón Island
- BN - Bioko Norte
- BS - Bioko Sur
- CS - Centro Sur
- KN - Kié-Ntem
- LT - Litoral
- WN - Wele-Nzas
