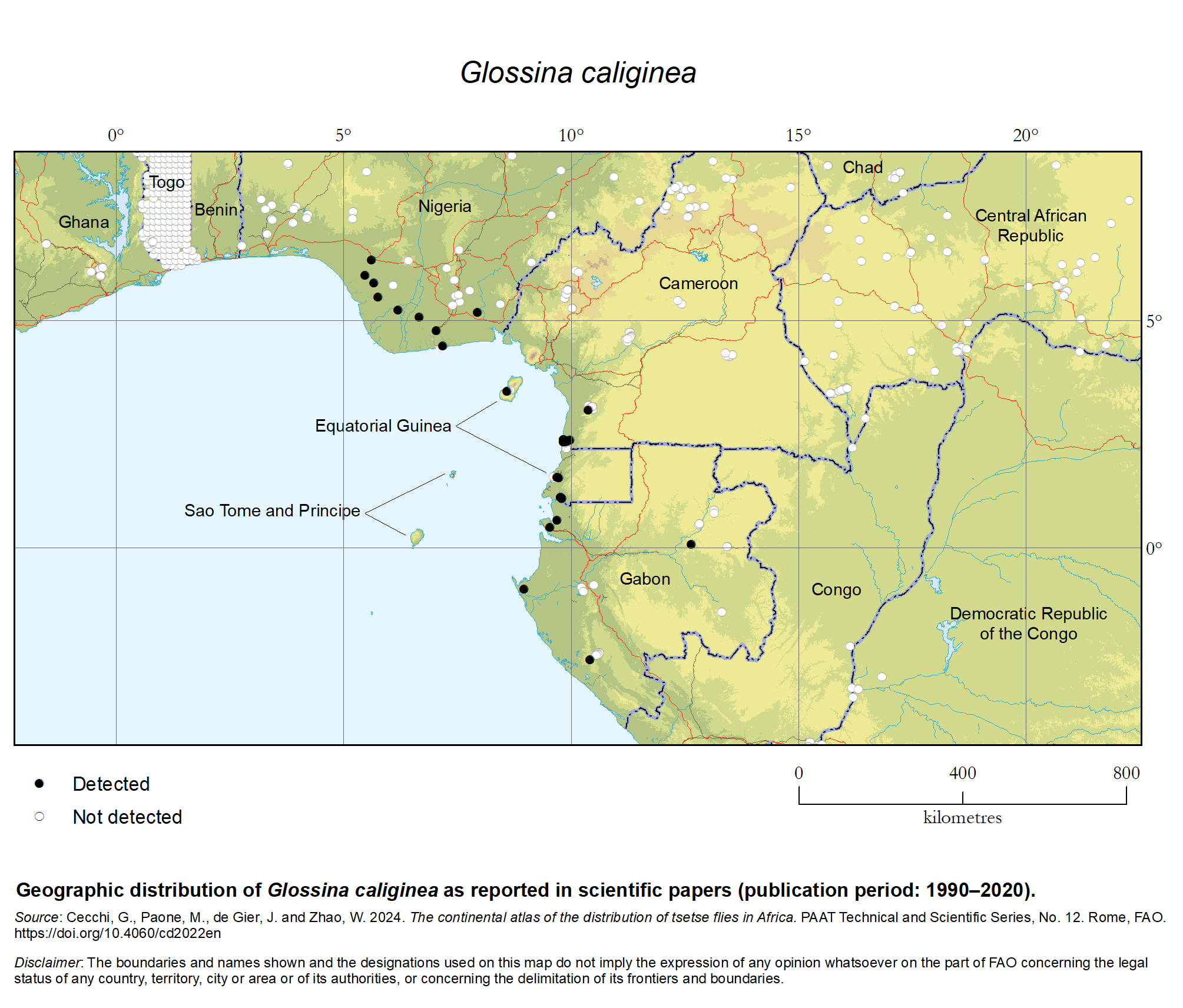
- Geographic distribution of Glossina caliginea as reported in scientific papers – Publication period 1990–2020

Scientific classification
- Kingdom: Animalia
- Phylum: Arthropoda
- Class: Insecta
- Order: Diptera
- Family: Glossinidae
- Genus: Glossina
- Species: G. caliginea

Binomial name
- Glossina caliginea Austen, 1911

= Glossina caliginea =

Species of fly

Glossina caliginea is one of the 23 recognized species of tsetse flies (genus Glossina), and it belongs to the riverine/palpalis group (subgenus Nemorhina).

== Distribution ==
Glossina caliginea was known to be present in seven countries in Africa: Cameroon, the Central African Republic, the Republic of the Congo, Equatorial Guinea, Gabon, Ghana and Nigeria. However, in the peer-reviewed scientific literature for the period 1990–2020, data on its occurrence was only available for four contiguous countries in central Africa and western Africa, i.e. Cameroon, Equatorial Guinea, Gabon and Nigeria. In Equatorial Guinea the species was detected in sympatry with other tsetse species of the palpalis and fusca groups, and in particular with the more abundant and widely distributed Glossina palpalis palpalis. All the studies that reported the presence of G. caliginea in Equatorial Guinea in the period 1990-2020 were carried out in sleeping sickness foci, i.e. Campo, Mbini and Kogo, while in Nigeria, the species was reported from a single study in the Niger Delta Region. Before 1990, reports or suggestions of G. caliginea occurrence also included the Central African Republic, the Republic of the Congo and Ghana.
