= Nsue =

Nsue is a Fang masculine name. Notable people with the name include:

- Baruc Nsue (born 1984), Equatoguinean footballer
- Emilio Nsue (born 1989), Spanish-born Equatoguinean footballer
- Fabián Nsue, Equatoguinean lawyer
- Federico Nsue (born 1997), Equatoguinean footballer
- Juanjo Muko Nsue (born 1993), Equatoguinean footballer and fashion stylist
- Leandro Mbomio Nsue (1938–2012), Equatoguinean sculptor and artist
- Luis Enrique Nsue (born 1998), Equatoguinean footballer
- Manuel Osa Nsue Nsua (born 1976), Equatoguinean politician and banker
- María Nsué Angüe (1945 or 1950–2017), Equatoguinean writer and politician
