= Geography of Equatorial Guinea =

Geography of the Republic of Equatorial Guinea República de Guinea Ecuatorial (Spanish) République de Guinée équatoriale (French) República da Guiné Equatorial (Portuguese)
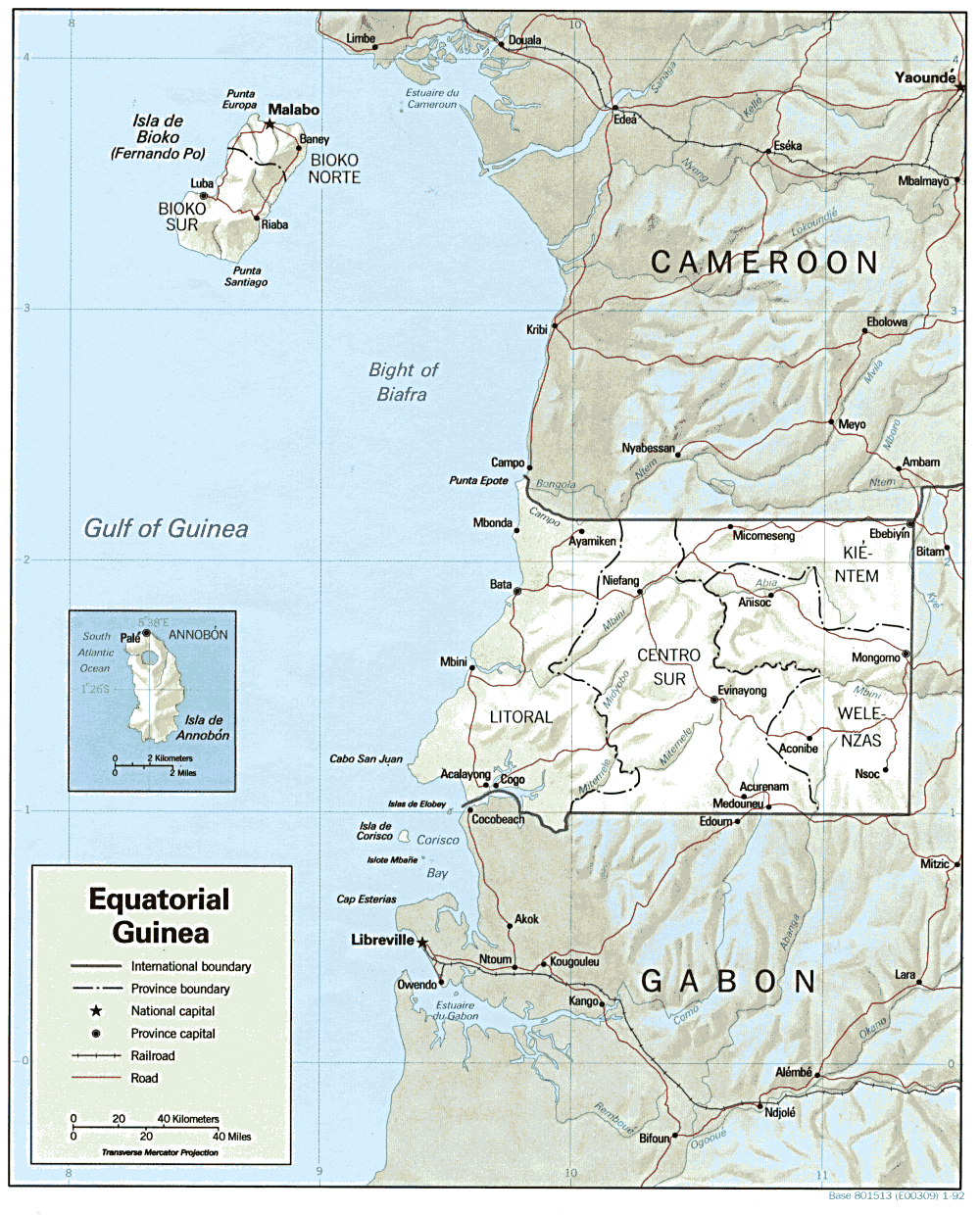
- Continent: Africa
- Coordinates: 2°00′N 10°00′E
- Area: Ranked 141st
  - Total: 28,051 km^{2} (10,831 sq mi)
- Coastline: 296 km (184 mi)
- Borders: 539 km
- Highest point: Pico Basile, 3,008 m
- Lowest point: Atlantic Ocean, 0 m
- Longest river: Benito River
- Climate: Tropical
- Natural resources: petroleum, timber, small unexploited deposits of gold, manganese, uranium
- Environmental issues: drinking water, desertification
- Exclusive economic zone: 303,509 km^{2} (117,185 mi^{2})

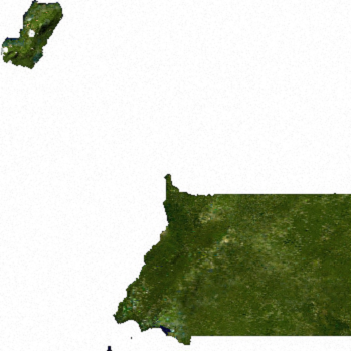
Satellite image of Equatorial Guinea

The Republic of Equatorial Guinea is located in west central Africa. Bioko Island lies about 40 kilometers (24.9 mi) from Cameroon. Annobón Island lies about 595 kilometres (370 mi) southwest of Bioko Island. The larger continental region of Río Muni lies between Cameroon and Gabon on the mainland; it includes the islands of Corisco, Elobey Grande, Elobey Chico, and adjacent islets. The total land area is 28,051 km^{2} (10,831 mi^{2}). It has an Exclusive Economic Zone of 303,509 km^{2} (117,185 mi^{2}).

Bioko Island, called Fernando Po until the 1970s, is the largest island in the Gulf of Guinea — 2,017 square kilometers (779 sq mi). It is shaped like a boot, with two large volcanic formations separated by a valley that bisects the island at its narrowest point. The 195-kilometer (121 mi) coastline is steep and rugged in the south but lower and more accessible in the north, with excellent harbors at Malabo and Luba, and several scenic beaches between those towns.

On the continent, Río Muni covers 26,003 square kilometers (10,040 sq mi). The coastal plain gives way to a succession of valleys separated by low hills and spurs of the Crystal Mountains. The Rio Benito (Mbini) which divides Río Muni in half, is unnavigable except for a 20-kilometer stretch at its estuary. Temperatures and humidity in Río Muni are generally lower than on Bioko Island.

Annobon Island, named for its discovery on New Year's Day 1472, is a small volcanic island covering 18 square kilometers (6.9 sq mi). The coastline is abrupt except in the north; the principal volcanic cone contains a small lake. Most of the estimated 1,900 inhabitants are fisherman specializing in traditional, smallscale tuna fishing and whaling. The climate is tropical—heavy rainfall, high humidity, and frequent seasonal changes with violent windstorms.

Location: Central Africa, bordering the Bight of Biafra, between Cameroon and Gabon.

== Area and boundaries ==
Area
- Total: 28,051 km²
  - country rank in the world: 141st
- Land: 28,051 km²
- Water: negligible km²

Equatorial Guinea's land boundaries total 539 km. It borders Cameroon (189 km) in the north and Gabon (350 km) in the east and south.

Area comparative
- Australia comparative: approximately 3/7 the size of Tasmania
- Canada comparative: approximately 1/2 the size of Nova Scotia
- United Kingdom comparative: approximately 1/3 larger than Wales
- United States comparative: slightly larger than Massachusetts
- EU comparative: slightly smaller than Belgium

Maritime claims: territorial sea: 12 nmi (22.2 km; 13.8 mi)

Exclusive economic zone: 303,509 km^{2} (117,185 mi^{2}) with 200 nmi (370.4 km; 230.2 mi)

== Terrain ==
Land Use (2012 est.)
- Arable land: 4.28%
- Permanent crops: 2.14%
- Other: 93.58%

Share of forest area in total land area, top countries (2021). Equatorial Guinea the seventh highest percentage of forest cover in the world.

Coastal plains rise to interior hills; islands are volcanic.

Total renewable water resources: 26 km^{3} (2011)

Natural hazards: violent windstorms, flash floods

Environment — current issues: tap water is not potable; deforestation

Environment — international agreements: party to: Biodiversity, Desertification, Endangered Species, Hazardous Wastes, Law of the Sea, Marine Dumping, Ozone Layer Protection, Ship Pollution, Wetlands

Geography note: insular and continental regions rather widely separated

== Climate ==
Köppen climate classification of Equatorial Guinea

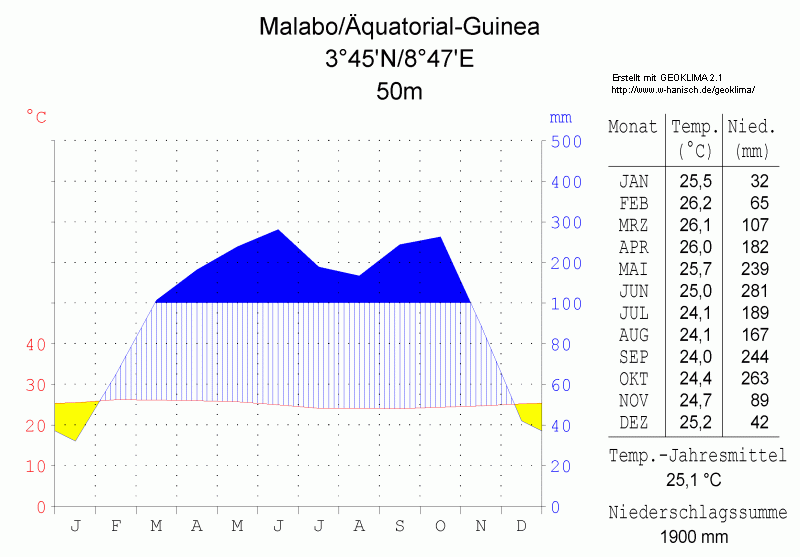
Climatological diagram of Malabo

The climate of both the continental region and the islands is typically equatorial, with high temperatures, heavy rainfall, and much cloud cover most of the year. Local variations are due to differences in altitude and proximity to the sea. The wet seasons in the continental region are from February to June and from September to December. Rainfall is higher on the coast than inland. In Bata the rainiest months are September, October, and November, with rainfall averaging more than 94 in (2,388 mm) a year. At Calatrava, farther south on the coast, it sometimes reaches 180 in (4,572 mm). Inland, however, rainfall diminishes; Mikomeseng, for example, receives only about 58 in (1,473 mm). The average annual temperature is about 79 °F (26.1 °C) and is fairly constant throughout the year. The temperature maxima are somewhat lower than in Bioko. The relative humidity, however, is higher than in Bioko. Bioko has a rather debilitating climate. The so-called dry season lasts from November to March, and the rest of the year is rainy. The average annual temperature of about 77 °F (25 °C) varies little throughout the year. Afternoon temperatures reach the high 80s °F (low 30s °C) and drop to only about 70 °F (21.1 °C) at night. Most of the time the sky is cloudy and overcast. Extreme rainfall occurs in the south, with rain brought by monsoon winds amounting to about 450 in (11,430 mm) a year around San Antonio de Ureca.

Climate data for Malabo
Month	Jan	Feb	Mar	Apr	May	Jun	Jul	Aug	Sep	Oct	Nov	Dec	Year
Record high °C (°F)	34.2 (93.6)	35.3 (95.5)	34.5 (94.1)	36.5 (97.7)	34.0 (93.2)	32.5 (90.5)	31.5 (88.7)	32.0 (89.6)	32.5 (90.5)	32.5 (90.5)	32.5 (90.5)	33.5 (92.3)	36.5 (97.7)
Mean daily maximum °C (°F)	31.1 (88.0)	31.8 (89.2)	31.3 (88.3)	31.3 (88.3)	30.5 (86.9)	29.5 (85.1)	28.4 (83.1)	28.0 (82.4)	28.1 (82.6)	28.8 (83.8)	29.8 (85.6)	30.8 (87.4)	30.0 (86.0)
Daily mean °C (°F)	26.9 (80.4)	27.7 (81.9)	27.6 (81.7)	27.2 (81.0)	26.7 (80.1)	25.9 (78.6)	25.3 (77.5)	25.0 (77.0)	25.1 (77.2)	25.5 (77.9)	26.1 (79.0)	26.6 (79.9)	26.3 (79.3)
Mean daily minimum °C (°F)	23.0 (73.4)	23.9 (75.0)	24.1 (75.4)	23.8 (74.8)	23.5 (74.3)	23.3 (73.9)	23.2 (73.8)	23.1 (73.6)	22.8 (73.0)	22.9 (73.2)	23.0 (73.4)	22.7 (72.9)	23.3 (73.9)
Record low °C (°F)	17.0 (62.6)	16.5 (61.7)	15.5 (59.9)	16.5 (61.7)	15.0 (59.0)	18.0 (64.4)	17.1 (62.8)	15.0 (59.0)	18.5 (65.3)	17.6 (63.7)	19.0 (66.2)	17.5 (63.5)	15.0 (59.0)
Average rainfall mm (inches)	28.9 (1.14)	70.6 (2.78)	102.7 (4.04)	155.7 (6.13)	227.1 (8.94)	260.8 (10.27)	202.0 (7.95)	177.1 (6.97)	250.1 (9.85)	254.3 (10.01)	100.3 (3.95)	39.6 (1.56)	1,869.1 (73.59)
Average rainy days (≥ 1.0 mm)	3.5	4.6	9.8	12.0	17.2	19.0	17.5	14.8	20.6	19.5	10.3	4.0	152.7
Average relative humidity (%)	83	83	84	84	87	89	90	89	91	90	88	84	87
Mean monthly sunshine hours	120.9	121.5	108.5	114.0	99.2	66.0	43.4	52.7	48.0	71.3	87.0	117.8	1,050.3
Mean daily sunshine hours	3.9	4.3	3.5	3.8	3.2	2.2	1.4	1.7	1.6	2.3	2.9	3.8	2.9
Source: Deutscher Wetterdienst

Climate data for Bata (1956–1965)
Month	Jan	Feb	Mar	Apr	May	Jun	Jul	Aug	Sep	Oct	Nov	Dec	Year
Record high °C (°F)	33.5 (92.3)	35.6 (96.1)	34.1 (93.4)	34.1 (93.4)	33.2 (91.8)	32.8 (91.0)	31.8 (89.2)	31.5 (88.7)	32.5 (90.5)	32.0 (89.6)	32.4 (90.3)	33.0 (91.4)	35.6 (96.1)
Mean daily maximum °C (°F)	30.5 (86.9)	31.1 (88.0)	31.3 (88.3)	31.0 (87.8)	30.7 (87.3)	29.7 (85.5)	28.8 (83.8)	28.9 (84.0)	29.1 (84.4)	29.1 (84.4)	29.6 (85.3)	30.1 (86.2)	30.0 (86.0)
Daily mean °C (°F)	25.6 (78.1)	25.8 (78.4)	25.7 (78.3)	25.6 (78.1)	25.6 (78.1)	25.0 (77.0)	24.1 (75.4)	24.2 (75.6)	24.6 (76.3)	24.8 (76.6)	25.2 (77.4)	25.0 (77.0)	25.1 (77.2)
Mean daily minimum °C (°F)	20.7 (69.3)	20.4 (68.7)	20.1 (68.2)	20.1 (68.2)	20.6 (69.1)	20.2 (68.4)	19.4 (66.9)	19.6 (67.3)	20.0 (68.0)	20.5 (68.9)	20.8 (69.4)	20.0 (68.0)	20.2 (68.4)
Record low °C (°F)	15.3 (59.5)	13.7 (56.7)	14.5 (58.1)	12.5 (54.5)	12.5 (54.5)	15.5 (59.9)	12.5 (54.5)	14.2 (57.6)	15.6 (60.1)	15.5 (59.9)	14.5 (58.1)	14.5 (58.1)	12.5 (54.5)
Average rainfall mm (inches)	116 (4.6)	102 (4.0)	205 (8.1)	292 (11.5)	285 (11.2)	90 (3.5)	25 (1.0)	26 (1.0)	221 (8.7)	457 (18.0)	306 (12.0)	109 (4.3)	2,234 (87.9)
Average rainy days (≥ 0.1 mm)	9	8	14	16	17	7	3	5	16	24	18	10	147
Mean monthly sunshine hours	201.5	192.1	173.6	177.0	189.1	147.0	142.6	142.6	114.0	114.7	141.0	186.0	1,921.2
Mean daily sunshine hours	6.5	6.8	5.6	5.9	6.1	4.9	4.6	4.6	3.8	3.7	4.7	6.0	5.3
Source: Deutscher Wetterdienst

== Forests ==
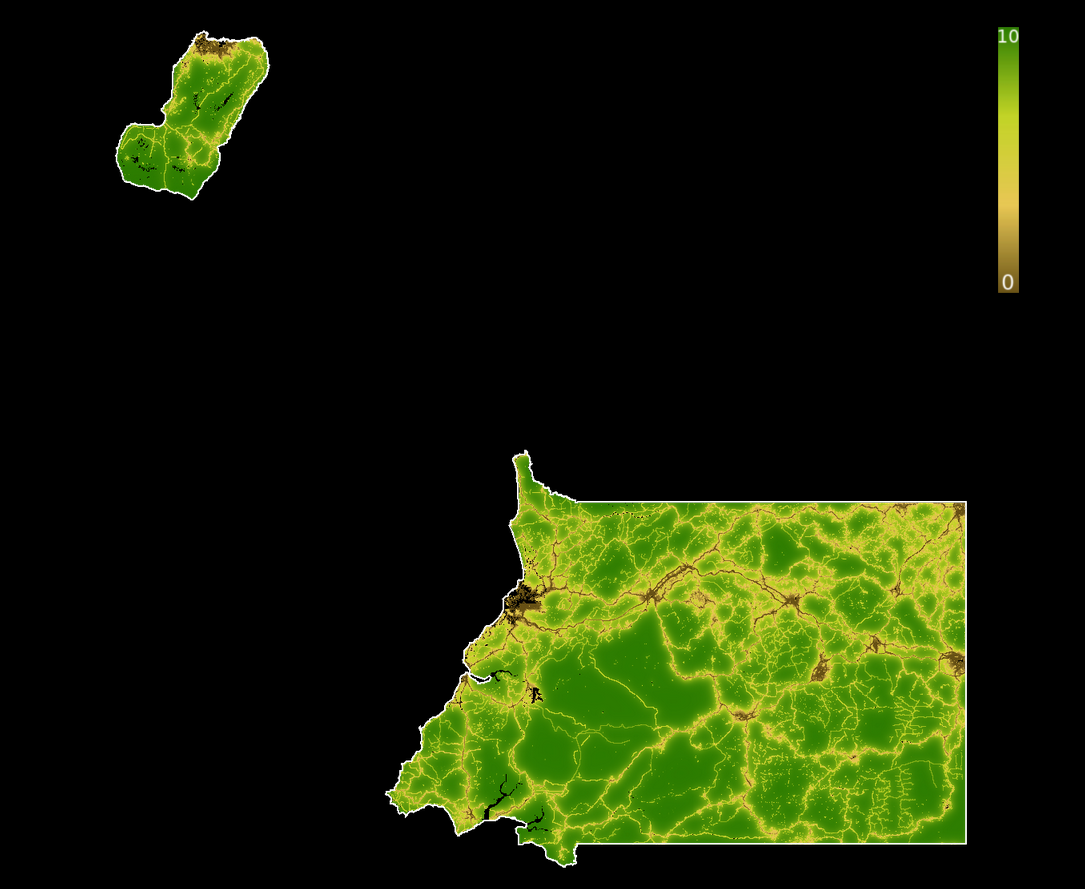
Equatorial Guinea had an average 2019 Forest Landscape Integrity Index score of 7.99, ranking it 30th out of 172 countries.

=== Tree cover extent and loss ===
Global Forest Watch publishes annual estimates of tree cover loss and 2000 tree cover extent derived from time-series analysis of Landsat satellite imagery in the Global Forest Change dataset. In this framework, tree cover refers to vegetation taller than 5 m (including natural forests and tree plantations), and tree cover loss is defined as the complete removal of tree cover canopy for a given year, regardless of cause.

For Equatorial Guinea, country statistics report cumulative tree cover loss of 155,331 ha (1,553.31 km^{2}) from 2001 to 2024 (about 5.9% of its 2000 tree cover area). For tree cover density greater than 30%, country statistics report a 2000 tree cover extent of 2,654,600 ha (26,546 km^{2}). The charts and table below display this data. In simple terms, the annual loss number is the area where tree cover disappeared in that year, and the extent number shows what remains of the 2000 tree cover baseline after subtracting cumulative loss. Forest regrowth is not included in the dataset.

Annual tree cover loss in Equatorial Guinea, 2001–2024. View chart definition.
Tree cover extent in 2000 minus cumulative tree cover loss in Equatorial Guinea, 2001–2024 (loss-only residual; does not account for gain). View chart definition.

Annual tree cover extent and loss
Year	Tree cover extent (km2) (Note: This residual measure does not include forest regrowth.)	Annual tree cover loss (km2)
2001	26,510.15	35.85
2002	26,480.29	29.86
2003	26,460.68	19.61
2004	26,456.46	4.22
2005	26,440.37	16.09
2006	26,427.82	12.55
2007	26,396.40	31.42
2008	26,348.18	48.22
2009	26,291.33	56.85
2010	26,225.40	65.93
2011	26,148.34	77.06
2012	26,098.81	49.53
2013	26,025.91	72.90
2014	25,833.80	192.11
2015	25,759.11	74.69
2016	25,663.66	95.45
2017	25,544.28	119.38
2018	25,466.04	78.24
2019	25,370.77	95.27
2020	25,322.06	48.71
2021	25,233.00	89.06
2022	25,155.39	77.61
2023	25,070.14	85.25
2024	24,992.69	77.45

== Extreme points ==
This is a list of the extreme points of Equatorial Guinea, the points that are farther north, south, east or west than any other location.

- Northernmost point — Punta Europa, Bioko Island
- Easternmost point — near Obileville village
- Southernmost point — A Dyibó, Annobón Island
- Westernmost point — Punta Dyiscoj, Annobón Island
