= Montserrat Señaba =

Equatorial Guinean politician (1918–1980)

Montserrat Señaba (1918-1980) was an Equatoguinean politician and feminist.

== Career ==
Montserrat was born in San Carlos de Luba in Equatorial Guinea in 1918. She died in 1980. She was a trained teacher by profession. She was a delegate of the government during the first years of independence of her country and dedicated herself to defending the rights of women, which resulted in her enmity with the male leaders. She was the mayor of San Fernando, and in all her attempts to reform (she tried to incorporate everything related to women's rights into the educational curriculum) she found herself challenged by male counterparts and sometimes with firm opposition from her peers. This situation brought her into difficult confrontations with the dominant patriarchal society in the Guinean society of the 1960s. Before the regime of Francisco Macías Nguema (the first President of Equatorial Guinea, from 1968 until his overthrow in 1979), Montserrat had to leave her native Guinea to go into exile. She traveled to Barcelona, where she achieved political refugee status.
