= María Nsué Angüe =

Equatoguinean writer and politician

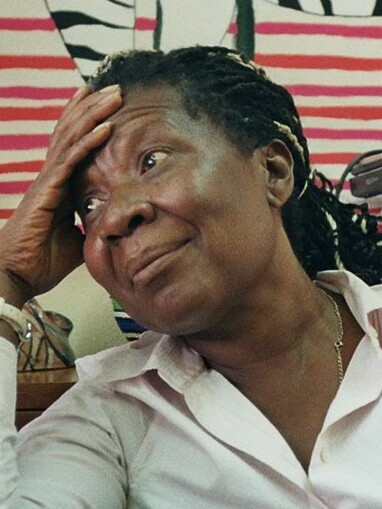
- Nsué Angüe in 2008
- Born: María Pilar Nsue Angüe Osa; 1945 or 1950; Bidjabidjan, Río Muni, Spanish Guinea
- Died: 18 January 2017; Malabo, Equatorial Guinea
- Occupations: Writer, poet, politician
- Writing career
- Notable work: Ekomo

María Pilar Nsue Angüe Osa (1945 or 1950 – 18 January 2017) was a noted Equatoguinean writer and Minister of Education and Culture.

== Background and early life ==
María was born in Bidjabidjan, Río Muni. Her family immigrated to Spain when she was a child where she studied literature. Born to ethnic Fang parents, she emigrated with her family to Spain when she was only eight years old. In narrating her own life, Maria Nsue often underscored the primal and formative impact of colonial interventions. She claimed to have been born in jail, in 1948, in the city of Bata, where her parents had been confined for resisting the authority of the colonial regime. She belonged to the Essasom tribe. She was the only child of José Nsue Angüe Osa and Alfonsina Mangue. Her father was an anticolonial and proindependence leader. She spent her early childhood in Bidjabidján as a result of the arbitrary delineations of European colonial cartographers and policy makers. At the age of eight, Maria Nsue was entrusted to a Protestant missionary family temporarily assigned to the local mission. This is the family that later took her to Madrid. She spent her youth under the Francoist regime. She would eventually return to Equatorial Guinea in her twenties after the country's independence.

== Writings ==
Her 1985 novel, and most acclaimed work, Ekomo was the first novel written by an Equatoguinean woman to be published. It tells the story of a Fang woman and her husband. Ekomo is considered a work that changes the way one views the world. Equatorial Guinea which once belonged to Spain gained its independence in 1968 and then fell under a military dictatorship. La Guinea Española is the beginning of Guinean literature where many works were published reflecting on the connections and the clash between Guinean, Spanish, and Latin American cultures. Ekomo is considered Hispano-African Literature which differs from Afro-Hispanic literature. Nnange is the main character of the novel writing after the death of her husband Ekomo. She tells of the struggles of attempting to find a cure for her husband's illness. She then begins reflecting on a woman's place in society and her current position as an outcast without a husband or children. Ekomo is the first novel written by a woman in Equatorial Guinea.

Constant themes in her writing are the oppression of women and the consequences of colonization.

== Works ==
=== Poetry, articles and poems ===
Nsué Angüe also wrote several short stories, articles and poems. Frequent topics addressed in her work involve women's rights and post-colonial African society. Much of her work is inspired by popular Fang literature. In addition to Ekomo, she is the author of a volume of short stories entitled Relatos (1999), largely based on traditional Fang stories of rural life, told as if from the perspective of a grandmother, but intertwined with an unrelenting criticism of the politico-economic situation in her country. Similarly rooted in tradition, but integrating percussion and live performance through the application of modern technologies, is the CD-ROM project Mbayah, o la leyenda del sauce llorón (Mbayah, or the Legend of the Weeping Willow), released in 1997, for which she composed the narrative and music.

- Ngouaba Nya, Jean Paul. Sobre los llamados "adjetivos relacionales" en el español de Guinea Ecuatorial : caso de "Ekomo" de María Nsué Angüe / Jean Paul Ngouaba Nya. Madrid, España: ACCI, Asociación Cultural y Científica Iberoamericana, 2017.
- Nsué Angüe, María, 1948- author. Short stories. SelectionsCuentos y relatos / María Nsué; prólogo de Gloria Nistal.Primera edición. Madrid (España): Sial Ediciones, 2016.
- La recuperación de la memoria: creación cultural e identidad nacional en la literatura hispano-negroafricana, M'bare N'gom (compilador)]. [Alcalá de Henares, Spain]: Universidad de Alcalá, Servicio de Publicaciones, [2004?]
- Miriam DeCosta-Willis (ed.), Daughters of the diaspora: Afra-Hispanic writers , Kingston; Miami: I. Randle, 2003.
