= 2023 Equatorial Guinea Marburg virus disease outbreak =

Marburg disease outbreak in Equatorial Guinea

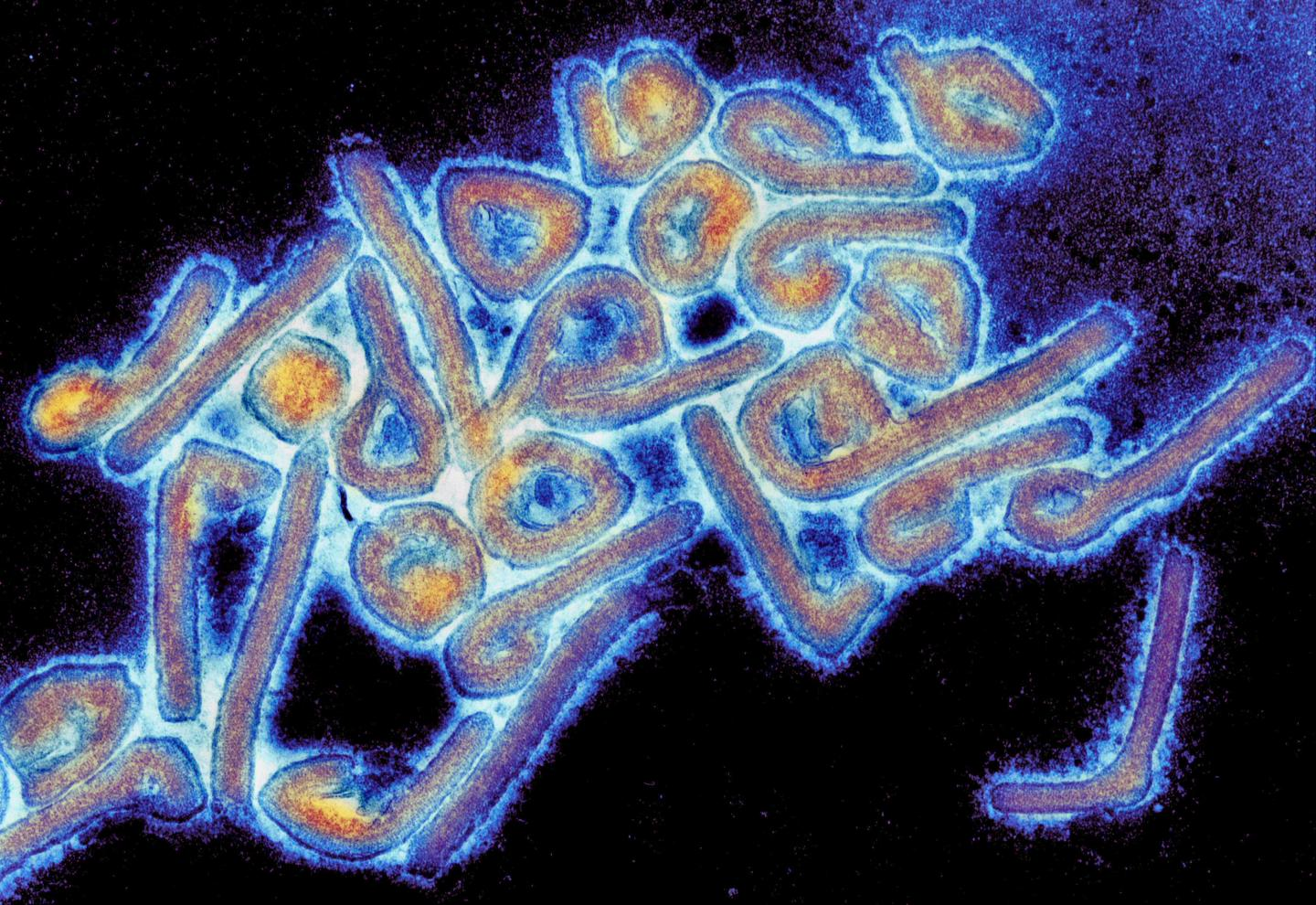
- Micrograph of Marburg viruses
- Disease: Marburg virus
- Location: Equatorial Guinea
- Date: 7 February 2023 – 8 June 2023
- Confirmed cases: 17
- Suspected cases: 28
- Deaths: 12 confirmed (20 suspected)
- Fatality rate: 71%

A disease outbreak was first reported in Equatorial Guinea on 7 February 2023 and, on 13 February 2023, it was identified as being Marburg virus disease. It was the first time the disease was detected in the country. As of 4 April 2023, there were 14 confirmed cases and 28 suspected cases, including ten confirmed deaths from the disease in Equatorial Guinea. On 8 June 2023, the World Health Organization declared the outbreak over. In total, 17 laboratory-confirmed cases and 12 deaths were recorded. All the 23 probable cases reportedly died. Four patients recovered from the virus and have been enrolled in a survivors programme to receive psychosocial and other post-recovery support.

== Background ==
Marburg virus disease is a viral hemorrhagic fever caused by the Marburg virus, with a case fatality ratio of up to 88 percent. Symptoms are similar to Ebola virus disease.

There are no vaccines or antiviral treatments for Marburg.

== Outbreak ==
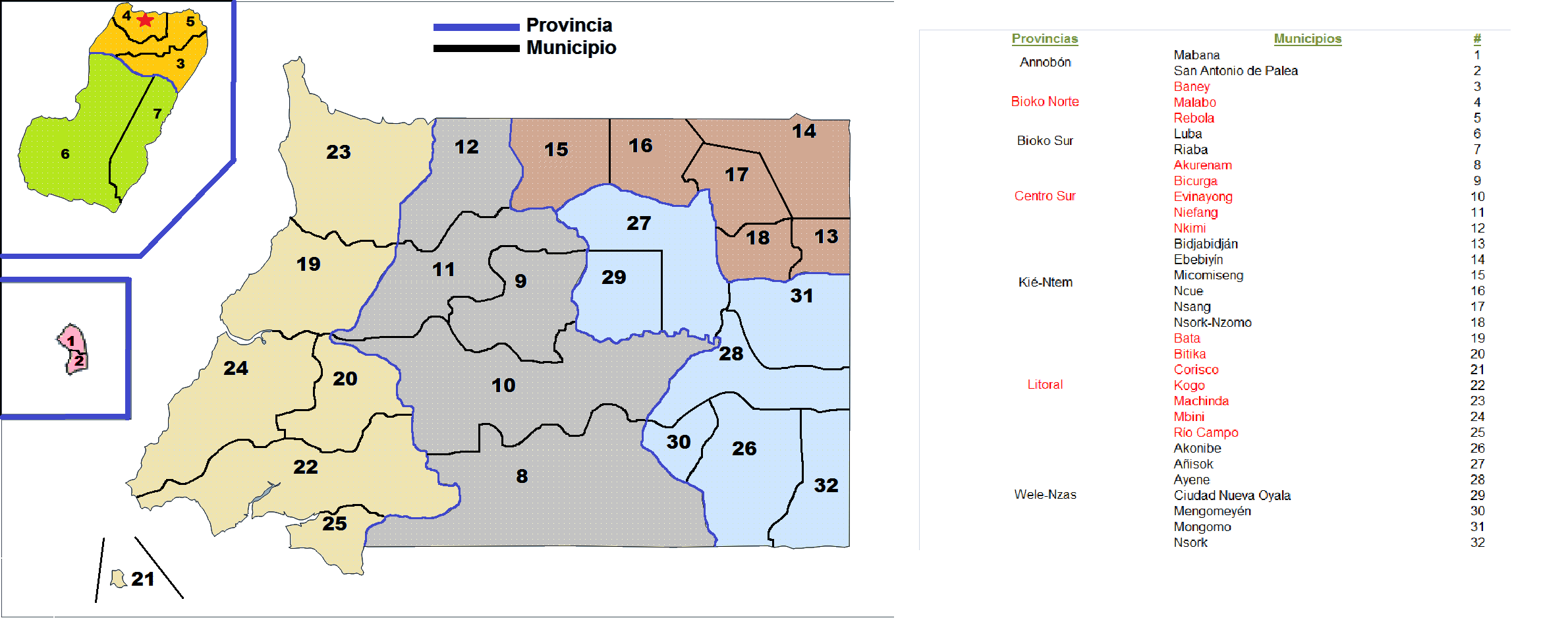
Municipalities of Equatorial Guinea, Africa

An outbreak of an unidentified illness was first reported on 7 February 2023 and linked to people who took part in a funeral ceremony in Kié-Ntem province's Nsok-Nsomo district. Eight deaths were reported by 10 February 2023, prompting a local lockdown, while Cameroon introduced border restrictions. Reported symptoms included nose bleeds, fever, joint pain and other ailments.

On 13 February 2023, the World Health Organization and Equatorial Guinea's health ministry announced that one of the samples sent to the Pasteur Institute laboratory in Senegal had tested positive for Marburg virus. At that time, there were 25 suspected cases, including 9 deaths. The condition of the confirmed case was not reported.

Neighbouring Cameroon detected two suspected cases of Marburg virus disease on 13 February 2023, but they were later ruled out.

On 25 February, a suspected case of Marburg was reported in the Spanish city of Valencia, however this case was subsequently discounted.

On 28 February, Equatoguinean Health Minister Mitoha Ondo'o Ayekaba reported that there had been two more deaths of people with symptoms of the disease.

On 4 April, it was reported that 10 confirmed deaths from the disease had occurred. It was also revealed that cases had been detected in four different districts of the country, including eight cases in the port city of Bata.

== See also ==
- List of epidemics
- List of other Filoviridae outbreaks
