= Nsok-Nsomo =

- Municipality
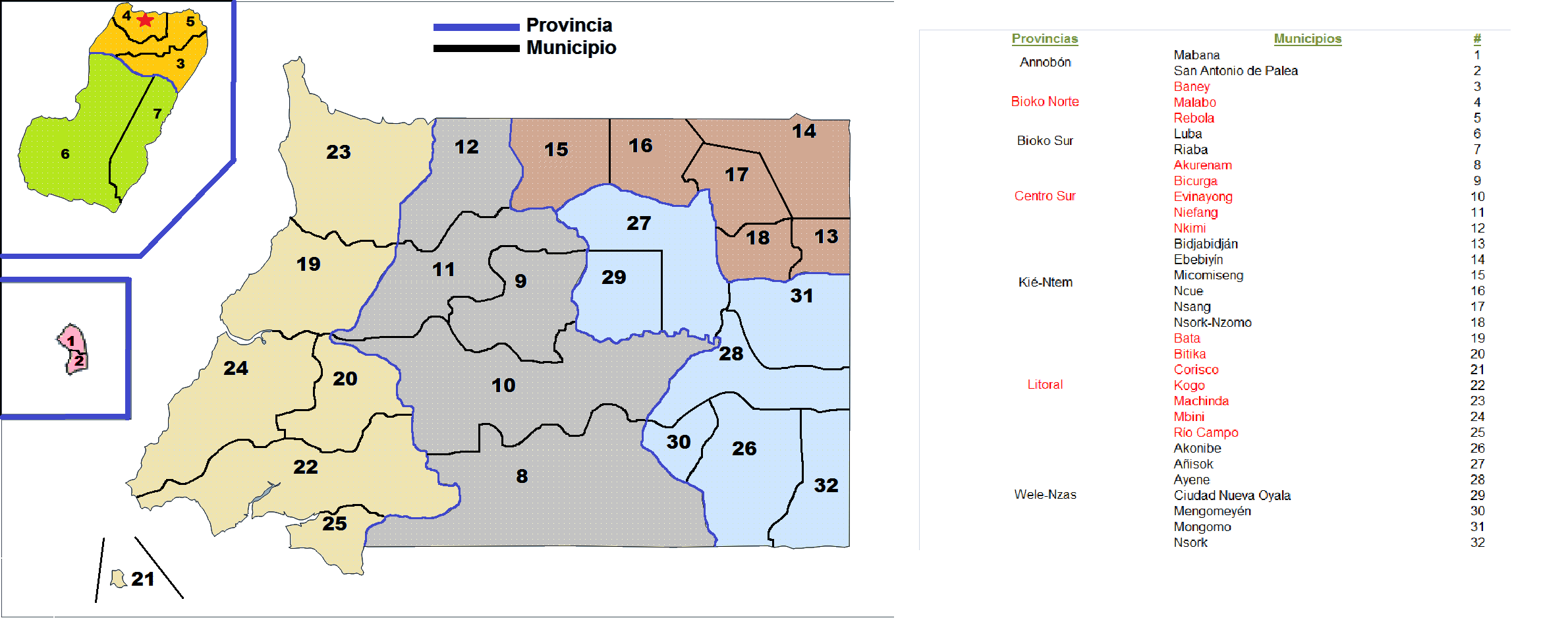
- Country: Equatorial Guinea

Nsok-Nsomo is a municipality of Continental region in Equatorial Guinea.

An outbreak of Marburg virus disease began in Nsok-Nsomo in February 2023, promoting a local lockdown.

== See also ==
- Subdivisions of Equatorial Guinea
