= Baháʼí Faith in Equatorial Guinea =

The Baháʼí Faith in Equatorial Guinea begins after ʻAbdu'l-Bahá wrote letters encouraging taking the religion to Africa in 1916. The first pioneer to Spanish Guinea was Elise Lynelle (then Elise Schreiber) who arrived in Bata, Spanish Guinea (as it was called then), on 17 May 1954, and was recognized as a Knight of Baha'u'llah. In 1968 the first Local Spiritual Assembly of Equatorial Guinea was elected in Santa Isabel, (later renamed Malabo). The community has elected a National Spiritual Assembly since 1984. The community celebrated its golden jubilee in 2004. The Association of Religion Data Archives estimated some 3,500 Baháʼís in 2005.

== Beginnings ==
=== ʻAbdu'l-Bahá's Tablets of the Divine Plan ===
ʻAbdu'l-Bahá wrote a series of letters, or tablets, to the followers of the religion in the United States in 1916–1917; these letters were compiled together in the book Tablets of the Divine Plan. The eighth and twelfth of the tablets mentionedAfrica and were written on 19 April 1916 and 15 February 1917, respectively. Publication however was delayed in the United States until 1919—after the end of the First World War and the Spanish flu. The tablets were translated and presented by Mirza Ahmad Sohrab on 4 April 1919, and published in Star of the West magazine on 12 December 1919. ʻAbdu'l-Bahá mentions Baháʼís traveling "...especially from America to Europe, Africa, Asia and Australia, and travel through Japan and China. Likewise, from Germany teachers and believers may travel to the continents of America, Africa, Japan and China; in brief, they may travel through all the continents and islands of the globe" and " ...the anthem of the oneness of the world of humanity may confer a new life upon all the children of men, and the tabernacle of universal peace be pitched on the apex of America; thus Europe and Africa may become vivified with the breaths of the Holy Spirit, this world may become another world, the body politic may attain to a new exhilaration...."

=== Establishment of the community ===
After the initiation of the Ten Year Crusade, initiated by Shoghi Effendi, head of the religion after the death of ʻAbdu'l-Bahá, coordinated efforts to expand the religion across Africa. The first pioneer to Spanish Guinea was Elise Lynelle (then Elise Schreiber) who arrived in Bata, Spanish Guinea (as it was called then), on 17 May 1954, and was recognized as a Knight of Baha'u'llah. Because of legal segregation she was unable to meet black Africans. Instead she was able to introduce the teachings of the religion, to a Spaniard, Jose Ramos Espinosa, who accepted the religion. With his assistance she was able to stay in the country longer and in June she sailed to the island of Corisco as part of her new job. Here she met the elderly King of the island, Santiago Uganda Mdelo and his nephew, Edward Robinson, both of whom readily accepted the religion. King Uganda told Lynelle that he had had a premonition about someone who would come to him with a message.

The Baháʼí Community in Equatorial Guinea came under the responsibility of the regional National Spiritual Assembly of North West Africa in 1956. In 1964 the constituent Baháʼí communities were reorganized as the regional assembly of the Baháʼís of West Central Africa, with its seat in Victoria, comprising the Baháʼís in the countries and places of Cameroon, Spanish Guinea, St. Thomas Island, Fernando Po Island, Corisco Island, Nigeria, Niger, Dahomey, Togo, and Ghana. Then in 1967 the National Spiritual Assembly of Cameroon Republic was elected with its seat in Victoria and oversaw the neighboring regions of Spanish Guinea, Fernando Po, Corisco, and São Tomé and Príncipe Islands. This was during a period of wide scale growth in the religion across Sub-Saharan Africa near the end of the period of Colonisation of Africa. Pioneers continued to arrive like Joseph Enonguene and Johanna Ngompex, who came from the Baháʼí community in Cameroon in the 1960s.

In 1967 in Santa Isabel (later renamed Malabo), pioneer Hassey Ime lived and helped a community in Fernando Poo island (later renamedBioko) and reported an estimated community of at least twenty there. In 1968 the first Local Spiritual Assembly of Equatorial Guinea was elected there. American pioneers Mr. and Mrs. George Karch were also members of the community. In June 1969 a local pioneer, Hans Ayukangu, moved to Biapa on Fernando Poo island where there was a group of four Baháʼís.

== Growth ==
Formation of the National Spiritual Assembly of Equatorial Guinea 18 July 1973. However, between 1972 and 1979 civil society in the country was under duress and religion was repressed (especially progressively from 1975 to 1979). The national assembly was dissolved in 1975-6 by government action.

The first citizen on Annobón a tiny island of Equatorial Guinea, joined the religion in early 1982. Jose Maria Fierro Cueto (also known as Dr. Pepe), came from Mexico to Equatorial Guinea in the 1980s to assist the Baha'i community. Following a change in government the national assembly was reformed in 1984. That same year it was invited to participate as an observer at the first "International Hispanic Congress of Culture" in Bata sponsored by UNESCO. The Baháʼí community also contributed a statement on topics of the congress like of the role of women in society and the importance of education and unity. The congress was designed to define a cultural aim for Equatorial Guinea and to help make that country better known around the world. Joseph Sheppherd was a pioneer to Cameroon and Equatorial Guinea, whose circumstances were woven into a book he later wrote which presents the Baháʼí Faith in a context of global change (see Baháʼí Faith in fiction) and delves into the dynamics of pioneering as a method to gain understanding of spiritual issues compared to social issues, to struggle with a cultural naivete. He served for two years as anthropological adviser to the government and curator of the National Ethnological and Archaeological Museum in Malabo.

== Modern community ==
Cities of Equatorial Guinea Baháʼís have held socio-economic development classes in

Since its inception the religion has had involvement in socio-economic development beginning by giving greater freedom to women, promulgating the promotion of female education as a priority concern. That involvement was given practical expression by creating schools, agricultural coops, and clinics even then. The religion entered a new phase of activity when a message of the Universal House of Justice dated 20 October 1983 was released. Baháʼís were urged to seek out ways, compatible with the Baháʼí teachings, in which they could become involved in the social and economic development of the communities in which they lived. Worldwide in 1979 there were 129 officially recognized Baháʼí socio-economic development projects. By 1987, the number of officially recognized development projects had increased to 1482. The modern Baháʼí community of Equatorial Guinea has multiplied its interests internally and externally along these lines. It sponsored a functional literacy course for women in Malabo and Bata starting in November 1996. Working with the Ministry of Women and Social Affairs, the community used Baháʼí Centers in Malabo, Baney, Luba, and Bata for the courses, which taught literacy as well as reproductive health, nutrition, and basic mathematics.

In 2004 the community celebrates its golden jubilee celebrations. The national television channel, Radio Television Malabo, covered the event. A monthly magazine, La Gazzetta, later published an article about the celebrations.

Baháʼí citizens of Equatorial Guinea were among those to gather in Yaounde, Cameroon, in a conference called for by the Universal House of Justice in 2008.

=== Demographics ===
In 2001 Operation World estimated 0.38%, or 1,720 people were Baháʼís—and growing at an annual rate of +4.2%. In 2004 there were four local assemblies in Equatorial Guinea. The Association of Religion Data Archives (relying mostly on the World Christian Encyclopedia) estimated nearly 3,552, or 0.5% of the national population, Baháʼís in 2005.

== See also ==
- Religion in Equatorial Guinea
- History of Equatorial Guinea
