= Corisco, Equatorial Guinea =

Corisco
- Location in Equatorial Guinea
- Coordinates: 0°55′N 9°19′E
- Country: Equatorial Guinea
- Province: Litoral

Population (2005)
  - Total: 2,541

Corisco is a city in Litoral, Equatorial Guinea. It is located on the island of Corisco and has a (2005 est.) population of 2,541.

== History ==
The missionary Robert Hamill Nassau arrived here for his first posting to Africa.

== Demography ==
The island is inhabited by the Benga people. Some of the women have come from the Kombe people.
