= Leandro Mbomio Nsue =

Equatoguinean sculptor and artist (1938–2012)

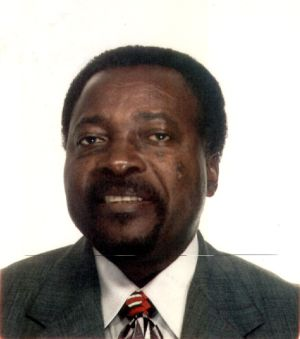
Leandro Mbomio Nsue

Leandro Mbomio Nsue Edú-Aguong (5 January 1938 – 12 November 2012) was an Equatorial Guinean sculptor and artist, and former minister of Education and minister of information, tourism, art and culture.

== Biography ==
Mbomio was born on 5 January 1938 in Evinayong, Spanish Guinea.

In October 2007, Mbomio was nominated Artist for Peace by the UNESCO,

Leandro studied art in Spain where he lived in exile for many years during the Franco period. He always favoured a Free Equatorial Guinea. When the New President called on him he left all for Equatorial Guinea. He was an African Partisan and was always close to President Teodoro Obiang. He lived in Malabo (RGE), Germany, Madrid, Barcelona, etc., and he was the President of the Council of Science and Technology of Equatorial Guinea and organ of the Presidency of Equatorial Guinea.

Mbomio died on 12 November 2012 in Río Muni, Bata.
