= Acalayong =

- Location in Equatorial Guinea
- Coordinates: 1°4′N 9°39′E
- Country: Equatorial Guinea
- Province: Litoral
- Climate: Am

Acalayong (ak-KAI-a-long) is a town on the Muni Estuary in Litoral Province, Equatorial Guinea, 80 km SSW from Bata. It is a border crossing town, the only one other than Kogo from which passengers traveling to Gabon from Bata and the other cities, especially those from the Littoral province of Equatorial Guinea sail to Cocobeach, Gabon.

Acalayong is not a significant tourist destination. The most popular method of crossing the estuary is by pirogues (dugout canoes), which can take passengers across the estuary to Gabon.

It is about 15 minutes away from Cogo by pirogue.
