= Bolondo =

- Location in Equatorial Guinea
- Coordinates: 1°37′N 9°38′E
- Country: Equatorial Guinea
- Province: Litoral

Bolondo is a coastal town in Equatorial Guinea.
