= Moka, Equatorial Guinea =

Moka
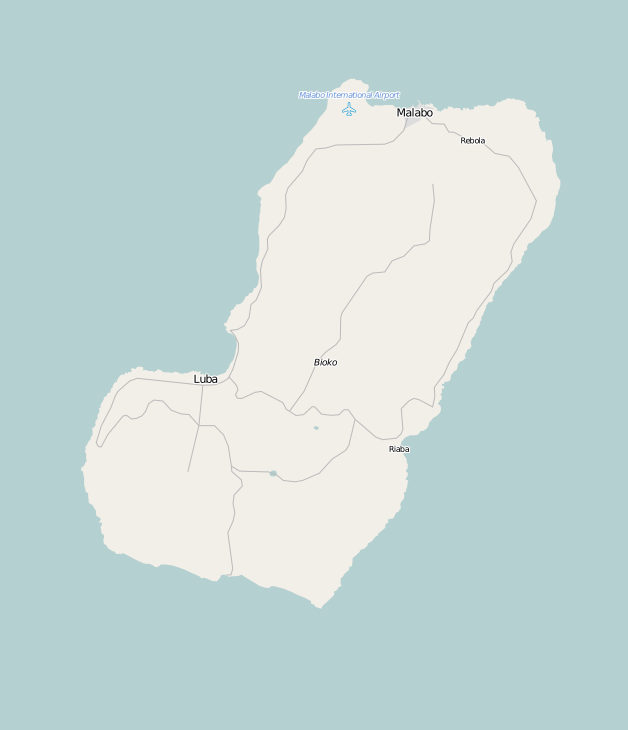
- Location in Bioko Moka (Equatorial Guinea)
- Coordinates: 3°20′N 8°40′E
- Country: Equatorial Guinea
- Province: Bioko Sur
- Elevation: 1,380 m (4,530 ft)
- Climate: Cfb

Moka, or Moca, is a town located on the island of Bioko in Equatorial Guinea. The town is named after the Bubi King Möókáta, or King Moka, who ruled from 1835 to 1845 and again from 1875 through 1898 during the Bahítáari Dynasty. There is a wildlife area called the Moka Wildlife Center BBPP.
