= Riaba =

- Riaba from its beach, 2013

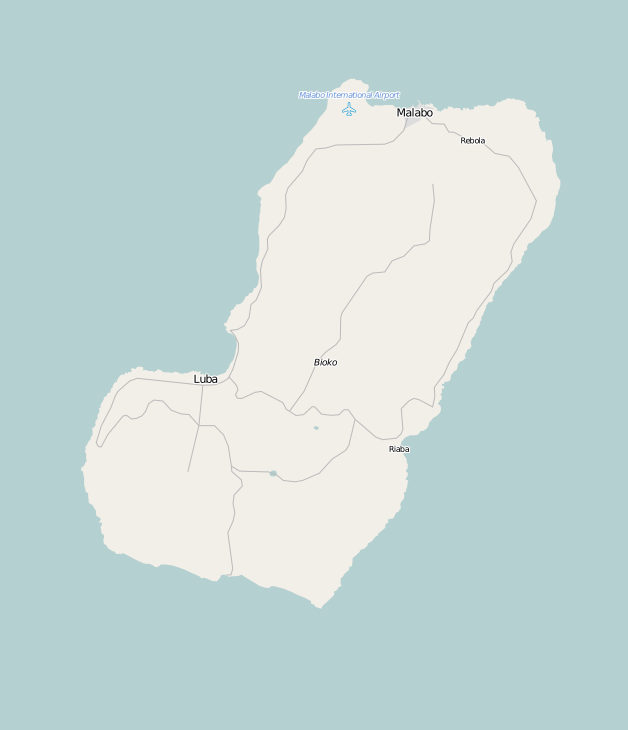
- Location in Bioko Riaba (Equatorial Guinea)
- Coordinates: 3°23′N 8°46′E
- Country: Equatorial Guinea
- Province: Bioko Sur

Population (2005)
  - Total: 1,071
- Climate: Am

Riaba is a town in Equatorial Guinea. It is also the 30th largest settlement in the country. It was founded in 1779 under the name of Concepción by the frigate lieutenant Guillermo Carboner. It was reestablished by the British in 1821.

== Location and population ==
It is located in the province of Bioko Sur. In 2005, its population was estimated at 1,071.

== Road communications ==
The European Union and the ADB in cooperation with the Equatorial Guinean government have developed a road network on Bioko connecting Riaba with other towns such as Luba and Malabo.
