= Kombe people =

Ethnic group in Equatorial Guinea

Kombe people are an African ethnic group, members of the Bantu group, who are indigenous to Equatorial Guinea. They are native speakers of the Kombe language.

At the beginning of the twentieth century, some of the women intermarried with the Benga people on the Isle of Corisco.

From 1964 to 1969, they were located in Punta Mbonda (North of Bata). They later settled in Cameroon, south of Bata, and south of Rio Benito. They are sometimes referred to as Ndowe or "Playeros" (beach people in Spanish), one of several peoples on the Rio Muni coast.
