= Mbere, Djibloho =

Mbere
- Urban district
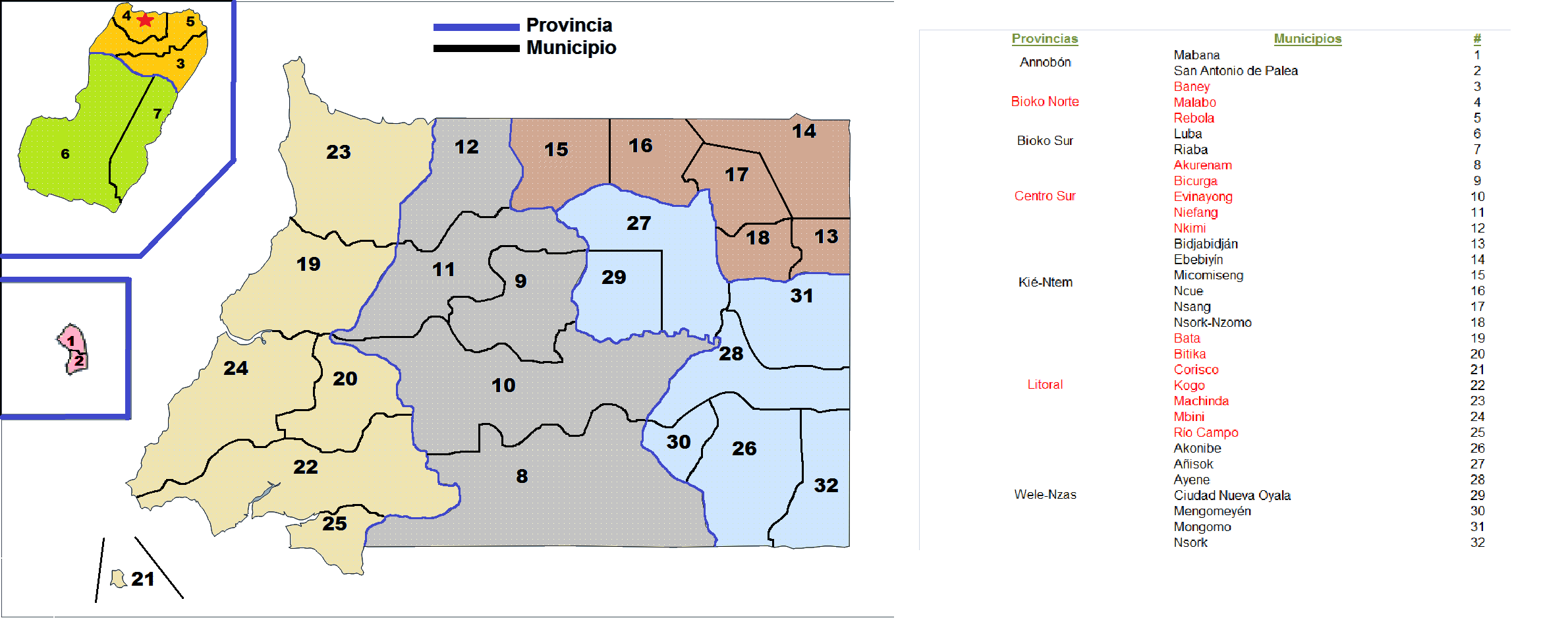
- Country: Equatorial Guinea

Mbere is an urban district of Djibloho, Equatorial Guinea.
