= Ayene =

- Location in Equatorial Guinea
- Coordinates: 1°54′32″N 10°38′7″E
- Country: Equatorial Guinea
- Province: Wele-Nzas
- District: Añisok

Population (2005)
  - Total: 3,482

Ayene is a town in Equatorial Guinea. It is located in the Añisok district in the province of Wele-Nzas and has a (2005 est.) population of 3,482.
