= Djibloho =

- Province
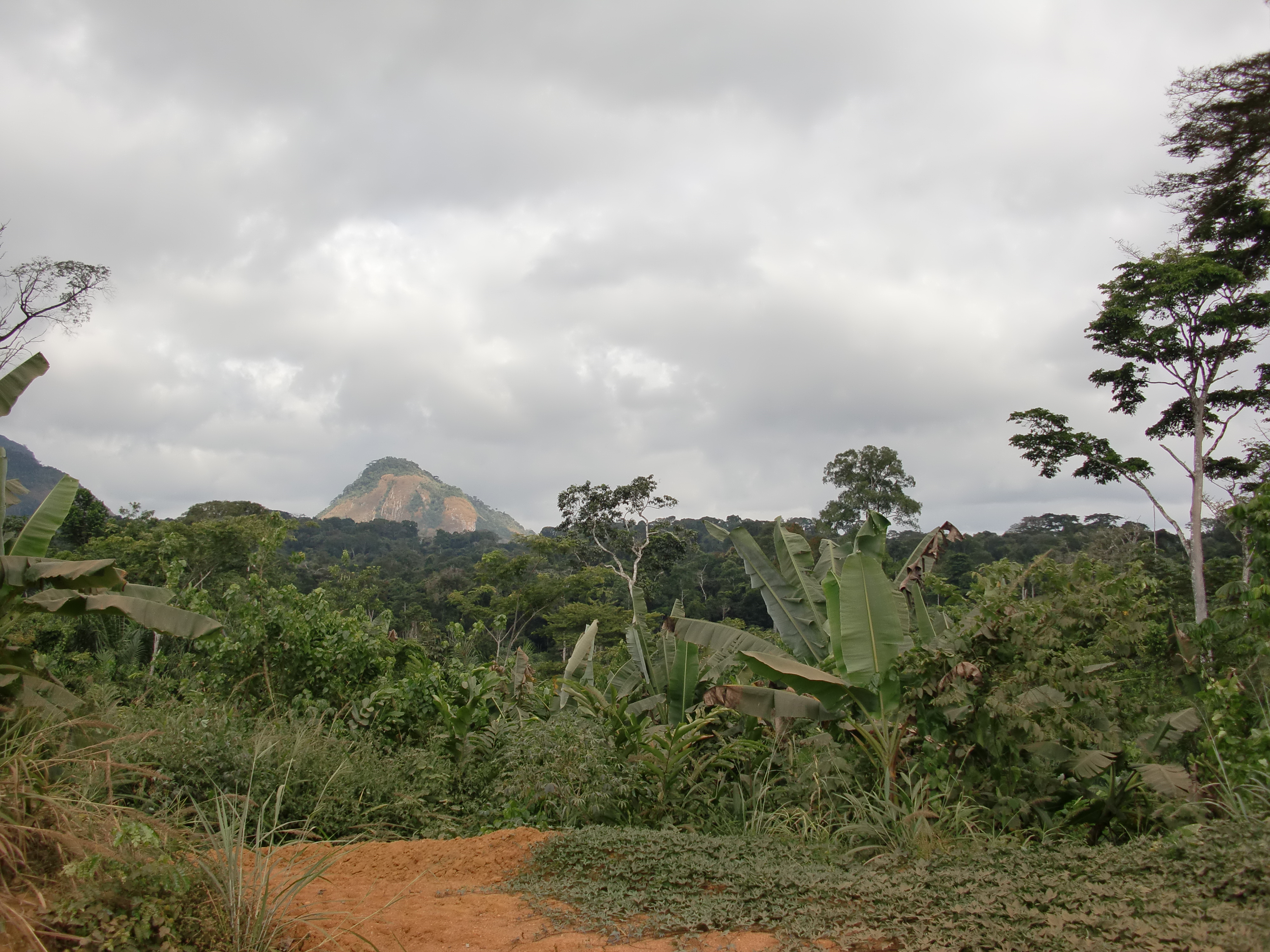
- Jungle around Ciudad de la Paz

- Location on the Equatorial Guinea mainland
- Coordinates: 1.6°N 10.8°E
- Country: Equatorial Guinea
- Established: 2017
- Capital: Ciudad de la Paz

Government
  - Governor: Marcelo Castro Ngua Nkulu
- Time zone: UTC+1 (WAT)

Djibloho (alternative name in Spanish: Djibló), officially the Administrative City of Djibloho (Spanish: Ciudad administrativa de Djibloho), is a province of Equatorial Guinea, formally established by law in 2017. The administrative city was initially carved out of Añisoc, a district in Wele-Nzas, on 1 August 2015, and was created to eventually replace Malabo as Equatorial Guinea's national capital.

== Administration ==
A clickable map of Equatorial Guinea exhibiting its two regions and eight provinces. The island nation of São Tomé and Príncipe is not part of Equatorial Guinea.

Djibloho comprises two urban districts, Ciudad de la Paz and Mbere. The capital is Ciudad de la Paz ("City of Peace"), known as Oyala until 2017. In the 2017 national parliamentary election, Djibloho elected one senator and one deputy.

Djibloho's first governor, Marcelino Oluy Abeso, was appointed in 2018 and served until 18 August 2020, when he died in a car crash. He was succeeded by Marcelo Castro Ngua Nkulu.
