= Bicurga =

- Location in Equatorial Guinea
- Coordinates: 1°35′N 10°28′E
- Country: Equatorial Guinea
- Province: Centro Sur

Population (2005)
  - Total: 2,318

Bicurga is a town in central Equatorial Guinea. It is located in the province of Centro Sur and has a (2005 est.) population of 2318.
