= Bitica =

Bitica Bitika
- Location in Equatorial Guinea
- Coordinates: 1°25′N 9°37′E
- Country: Equatorial Guinea
- Province: Litoral

Population (2005)
  - Total: 1,464
- Climate: Am

Bitica is a town in Litoral, Equatorial Guinea. It has a (2005 est.) population of 1,464.
