= Nkimi =

- Location in Equatorial Guinea
- Coordinates: 1°56′N 10°21′E
- Country: Equatorial Guinea
- Province: Centro Sur

Population (2005)
  - Total: 3,313

Nkimi is a city in Centro Sur, Equatorial Guinea. It has a (2005 est.) population of 3,313.
