= Río Campo =

- Nickname: Río
- Location in Equatorial Guinea
- Coordinates: 2°20′N 9°49′E
- Country: Equatorial Guinea
- Province: Litoral

Government
  - President: Teodoro Obiang
  - Prime Minister: Ignacio Milam

Area
  - City: 3,370 km^{2} (1,300 sq mi)
  - Land: 3,370 km^{2} (1,300 sq mi)
  - Water: 0 km^{2} (0 sq mi)
  - Urban: 0 km^{2} (0 sq mi)
  - Metro: 0 km^{2} (0 sq mi)
- Elevation: 38.1 m (125 ft)

Population (2005)
  - City: 1,105
  - Density: 20/km^{2} (52/sq mi)
- Time zone: WAT
  - Summer (DST): WAT
- Climate: Aw
- Website: http://www.africacyberspace.com/City/City.aspx?City=GNQ029

Río Campo is a town in Litoral, Equatorial Guinea. It has a population of 1,105 (2005 est.). The town is located inside the Rio Campo Natural Reserve and on the border of Cameroon.

== Religion ==
The principal religion in Equatorial Guinea is Christianity which is the faith of 93% of the population. Rio Campo has mostly indigenous beliefs due to its remoteness. These are predominantly Roman Catholic (87%) while a minority are Protestants (5%). Another 5% of the population follow indigenous beliefs and the final 2% comprises Muslims, Bahá'í Faith, and other beliefs.

== Culture and language ==
The town has a variety of both European and African languages. Official languages are Spanish, French and Portuguese. Some recognized languages are Fang, Bube, Annobonese. For culture see Culture of Equatorial Guinea.

== Physical geography ==
Río Campo sits 125 feet or 38 metres above sea level. The nearest large open bodies of water are the Gulf of Guinea and the Atlantic Ocean. The small town borders the country of Cameroon to the east. To the east there is a river that runs from the town Yenge and drains into the Atlantic Ocean.

== Wildlife ==
Rio Campo is home to many different and unique animal and plant species. There has been much pressure on the reserve itself for not taking better care of the land and animals.

== Climate ==
Río Campo has a tropical savanna climate (Köppen Aw), less wet than most of Equatorial Guinea, although it bears more resemblance to the tropical monsoon climate typical of the country. Much of the region is covered in tropical rainforest, more typical of tropical monsoon climates. The short dry season from December to February occurs in the same months as Malabo’s, but the opposite to the dry season in Bata or Libreville.

Climate data for Río Campo
Month	Jan	Feb	Mar	Apr	May	Jun	Jul	Aug	Sep	Oct	Nov	Dec	Year
Record high °C (°F)	32 (90)	33 (91)	32 (90)	32 (90)	32 (90)	31 (88)	29 (84)	30 (86)	31 (88)	31 (88)	31 (88)	31 (88)	33 (91)
Mean daily maximum °C (°F)	31 (88)	32 (90)	31 (88)	32 (90)	31 (88)	29 (84)	29 (84)	29 (84)	30 (86)	30 (86)	30 (86)	31 (88)	30 (86)
Mean daily minimum °C (°F)	19 (66)	21 (70)	21 (70)	21 (70)	22 (72)	21 (70)	21 (70)	21 (70)	21 (70)	21 (70)	22 (72)	21 (70)	21 (70)
Record low °C (°F)	18 (64)	19 (66)	19 (66)	19 (66)	19 (66)	18 (64)	18 (64)	17 (63)	18 (64)	18 (64)	19 (66)	17 (63)	17 (63)
Average rainfall mm (inches)	5 (0.2)	31 (1.2)	193 (7.6)	163 (6.4)	262 (10.3)	302 (11.9)	160 (6.3)	114 (4.5)	201 (7.9)	231 (9.1)	117 (4.6)	20 (0.8)	1,799 (70.8)
