= Nsang =

- Location in Equatorial Guinea
- Coordinates: 2°2′N 10°56′E
- Country: Equatorial Guinea
- Province: Kié-Ntem

Population (2005)
  - Total: 2,122

Nsang is a town in Equatorial Guinea. It is located in the province of Kié-Ntem and has a (2005 est.) population of 2,122.
