= Niefang =

- Location in Equatorial Guinea
- Coordinates: 1°51′N 10°15′E
- Country: Equatorial Guinea
- Province: Centro Sur

Population (2015 est.)
  - Total: 41,084
- Climate: Am

Niefang (alternative name in Spanish: Niefan) is a city in Equatorial Guinea. It is located in the province of Centro Sur and has a (2015 est.) population of 41,084. The city was formerly named Sevilla de Niefang during Spanish occupation. Niefang was traditionally the western border of the Fang tribal area. Its name means "Limit of the Fang". More to the west were the areas of the coastal Bantu-tribes referred to as "Playeros" (Beach People in Spanish): Combes, Bujebas, Balengues, and Bengas. Niefang lies on the Benito River.
