= Ncue =

Town in Equatorial Guinea

Ncue San Francisco Javier de Ncue
- Town
- Location in Equatorial Guinea (Rio Muni)
- Coordinates: 2°01′N 10°28′E
- Country: Equatorial Guinea
- Province: Kié-Ntem

Population (2005)
  - Total: 1,683

Ncue (or Nkue, Spanish: San Francisco Javier de Ncue) is a town in Equatorial Guinea. It is located in the province of Kié-Ntem, and it had a population of 1,740 as of 2001.
