= Machinda =

- Location in Equatorial Guinea
- Coordinates: 1°53′N 9°58′E
- Country: Equatorial Guinea
- Province: Litoral

Population (2005)
  - Total: 2,897

Machinda is a town in Equatorial Guinea. It is located in the province of Litoral and has a (2005 est.) population of 2,897.

The average elevation of Machinda is 631 meters.
