= Añisoc =

Town in Equatorial Guinea

- Location within Equatorial Guinea
- Coordinates: 1°51′N 10°46′E
- Country: Equatorial Guinea
- Province: Wele-Nzas

Population (2012)
  - Total: 16,626
- Climate: Am

Añisoc (or Añisok) is a town in Equatorial Guinea. It is located on the Equatoguinean mainland (Rio Muni), in Wele-Nzas Province.

During the Spanish colonial period, it was known as Bimbiles. It was home to a prison under Francisco Macías Nguema, and many people in and around Añisoc were victims of Macías Nguema's oppressive rule.

Añisoc had an estimated population of 12,705 in 2008 and a population of 16,626 in 2012.
