= Aconibe =

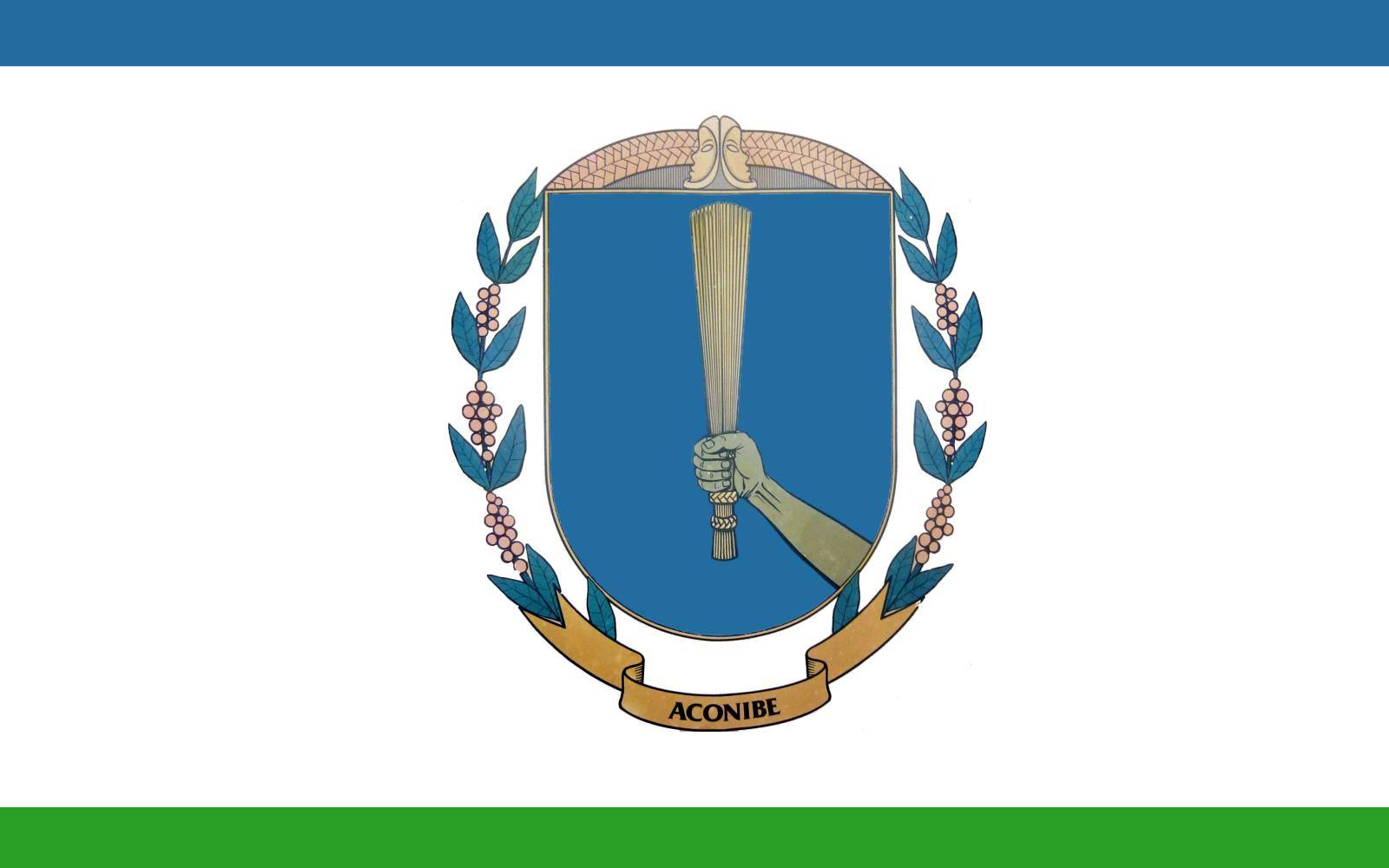
- Flag

- Location in Equatorial Guinea
- Coordinates: 1°18′00″N 10°55′59″E
- Country: Equatorial Guinea
- Province: Wele-Nzas
- Elevation: 565 m (1,854 ft)

Population (2012)
  - Total: 16,543
- Climate: Aw

Aconibe (or Akonibe) is a town located on mainland Equatorial Guinea, in the eastern portion of the country. It has a population of 13,382 (2008 est.). It is the 4th largest settlement in the country.
