= Bidjabidjan =

- Location in Equatorial Guinea
- Coordinates: 2°9′52″N 11°8′47″E
- Country: Equatorial Guinea
- Province: Kié-Ntem

Population (2005)
  - Total: 4,998

Bidjabidjan is a city in Equatorial Guinea. It is located in the province of Kié-Ntem and has a (2005 est.) population of 4,998.
