= Cogo, Equatorial Guinea =

Kogo
- Location in Equatorial Guinea
- Coordinates: 1°5′N 9°42′E
- Country: Equatorial Guinea
- Province: Litoral
- Elevation: 115 m (377 ft)

Population (1994)
  - Total: 4,607
- Time zone: UTC+1 (UTC/GMT+1)
- Climate: Am

Kogo (Spanish: [ˈkoɣo], also known as Cogo or Koszho, formerly Puerto Iradier) is a remote town on the Muni estuary in Río Muni, Equatorial Guinea, lying east of Acalayong. It is known for its partly ruined Spanish Colonial architecture. It is the southernmost city of the Litoral province of Equatorial Guinea. It is located 121 km from Bata by road or 117 km when traveling through Acalayong. It is surrounded to the east and southeast by the Congüe River and to the west and southwest by the Mitemele River. Both the Congüe and the Mitemele Rivers drain the Muni Estuary, sometimes giving the city of Kogo the shape and appearance of an island when in fact it is a peninsula.

A few meters from the port that is currently being renovated is the uninhabitable Island of Evele. Most of the population, especially the coastal population heavily rely on subsistence fishing and the Muni estuary was a major source of income as it was the gateway for passengers traveling to neighboring Gabon.

There is a large monument to Manuel Iradier who was the first European settler in 1874.

Kogo is the home town of internationally recognized doctor and political activist, Wenceslao Mansogo.

Chromosome 6, a 1997 novel by writer Robin Cook, takes place in Kogo.

== Sister cities ==
- Vitoria, Spain
