= Río Muni =

Mainland geographical region of Equatorial Guinea

Coordinates: 1°30′N 10°30′E

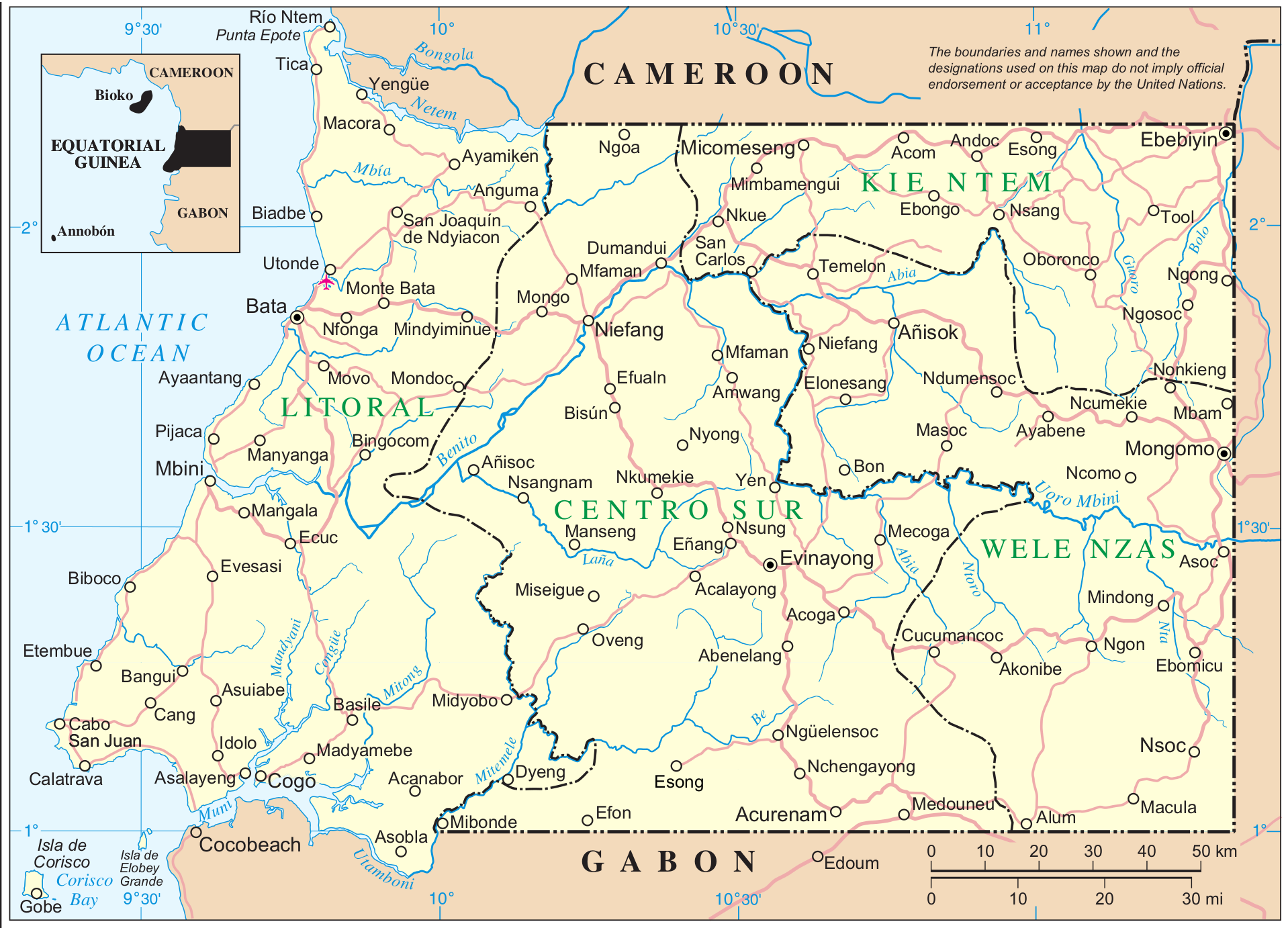
Río Muni

Coat of arms of the Spanish Río Muni colony

Río Muni (called Mbini in Fang) is the Continental Region (called Región Continental in Spanish) of Equatorial Guinea, and comprises the mainland geographical region, covering 26,017 square kilometres (10,045 sq mi). The name is derived from the Muni River, along which the early Europeans had built the Muni River Settlements.

Río Muni is bordered to the north by Cameroon, to the east and south by Gabon and to the west by the Gulf of Guinea.

== History ==
Río Muni was ceded by Portugal to Spain in 1778 in the Treaty of El Pardo. The Spanish had hoped to collect slaves to work in their other overseas possessions, but the settlers died of yellow fever, and the area was deserted. Cocoa and timber became major industries upon recolonization. Río Muni, along with Bioko, became a province of Spanish Guinea in 1959.

== Population ==
In 2015, 885,015 people—about 72% of Equatorial Guinea's population—lived in Río Muni. The main languages spoken in Río Muni are Fang-Ntumu, which is spoken in the north, and Fang-Okak, spoken in the south. Spanish is also spoken, although only as a second language.

== Provinces ==
Río Muni comprises five provinces:

- Centro Sur
- Djibloho
- Kié-Ntem
- Litoral
- Wele-Nzas

== Cities ==
The largest city is Bata, which also serves as the regional administrative capital. Other major towns include Evinayong, Ebebiyín, Acalayong, Acurenam, Mongomo and Mbini.

== See also ==
- Elobey, Annobón and Corisco
- Popular Idea of Equatorial Guinea
- Postage stamps and postal history of Equatorial Guinea
