= Mbini =

Town in Equatorial Guinea

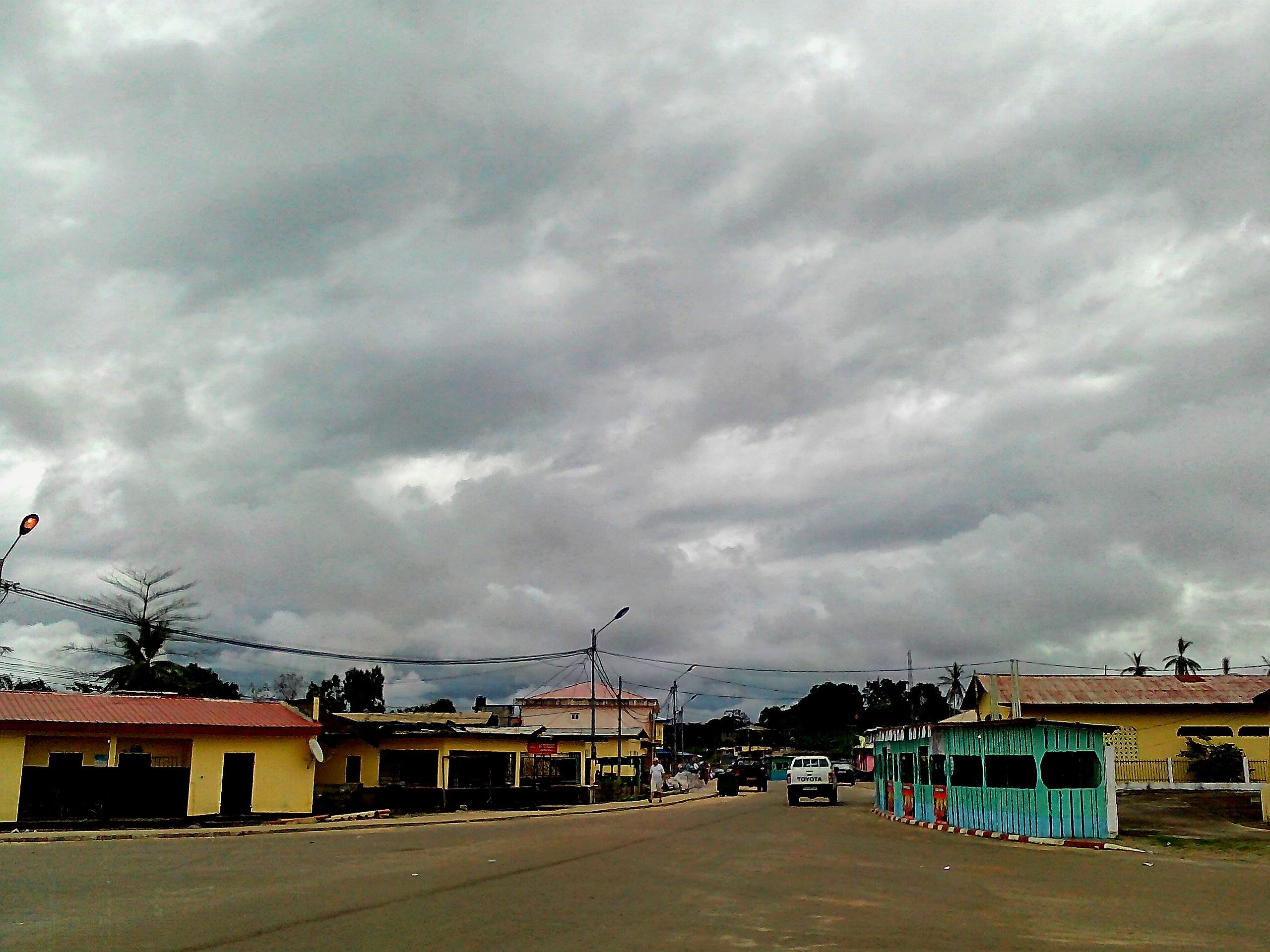

- Location in Equatorial Guinea
- Coordinates: 1°35′N 9°37′E
- Country: Equatorial Guinea
- Province: Litoral

Population (2001)
  - Total: 3,421
- Time zone: UTC+1 (UTC/GMT+1)
- Climate: Am

Mbini is a town in Río Muni, Equatorial Guinea, lying along the Atlantic coast at the mouth of the Benito River. Before 1973, it was known as Benito or Río Benito Town. Mbini is the Ndowe name for Río Muni. It is located 44 km southwest of Bata.

As of 2001, the urban population of Mbini was 3,421. The city is linked by ferry with Bolondo, and is known for its seafood and for nearby beaches.
