= Baney =

Baney Santiago de Baney
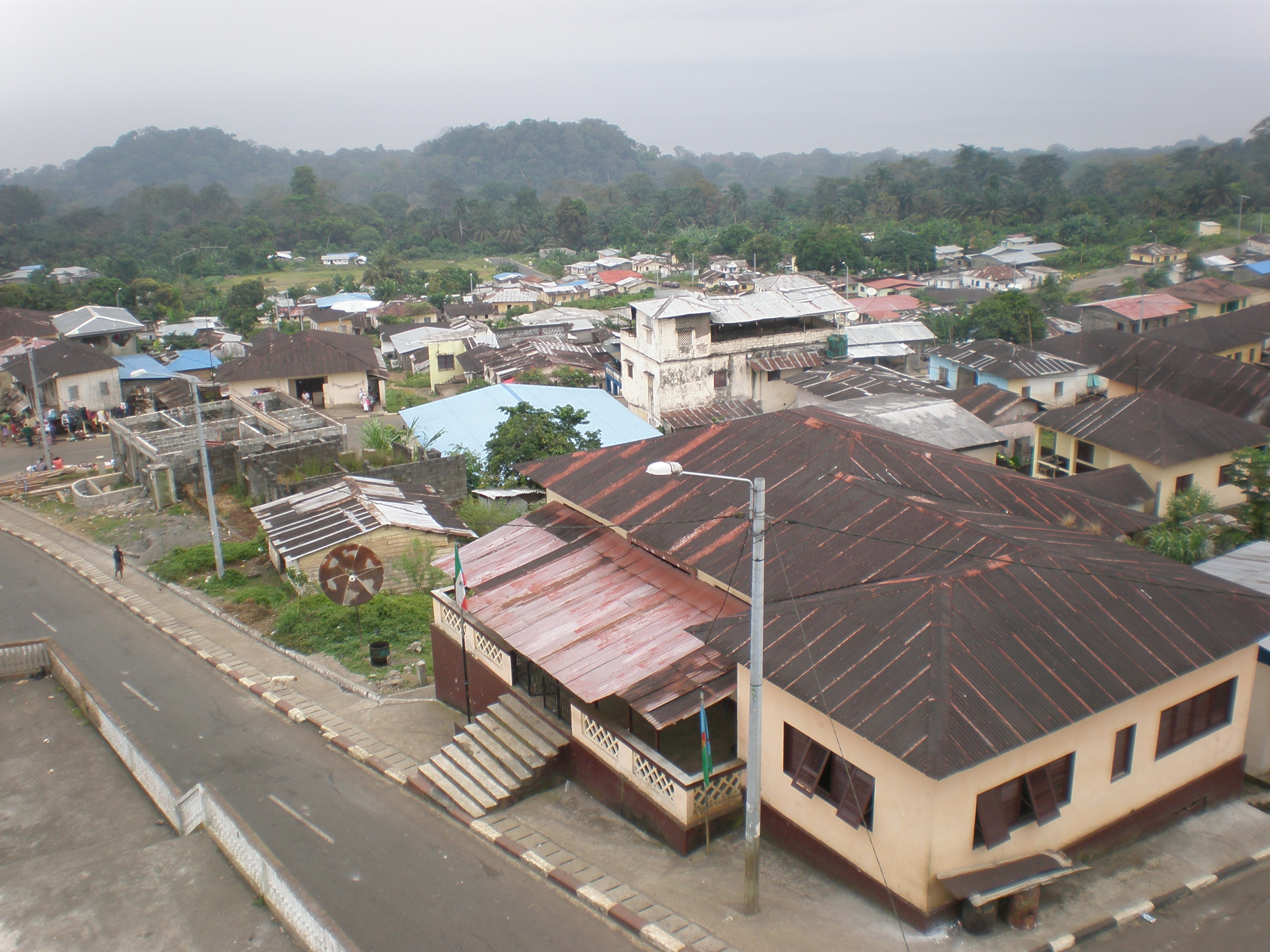

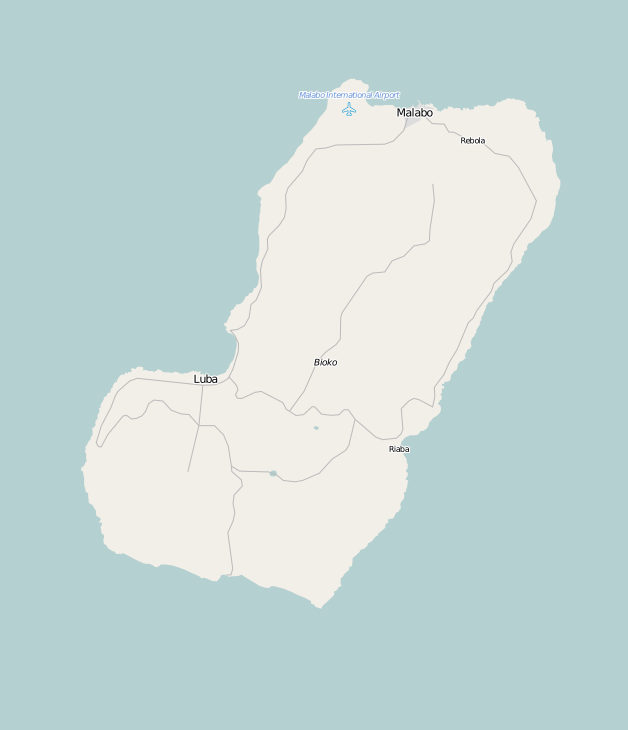
- Location in Bioko Baney (Equatorial Guinea)
- Coordinates: 3°42′N 8°55′E
- Country: Equatorial Guinea
- Province: Bioko Norte

Population (2015)
  - Total: 29,366
- Climate: Am

Baney (also known as Santiago de Baney) is a town and municipality in Equatorial Guinea. It is located in Bioko Norte Province and has a population of 29,366 in 2015. On July 16, 2005, an Antonov An-24 crashed at the city. All 60 people on board died.
