= Rebola, Equatorial Guinea =

Rebola
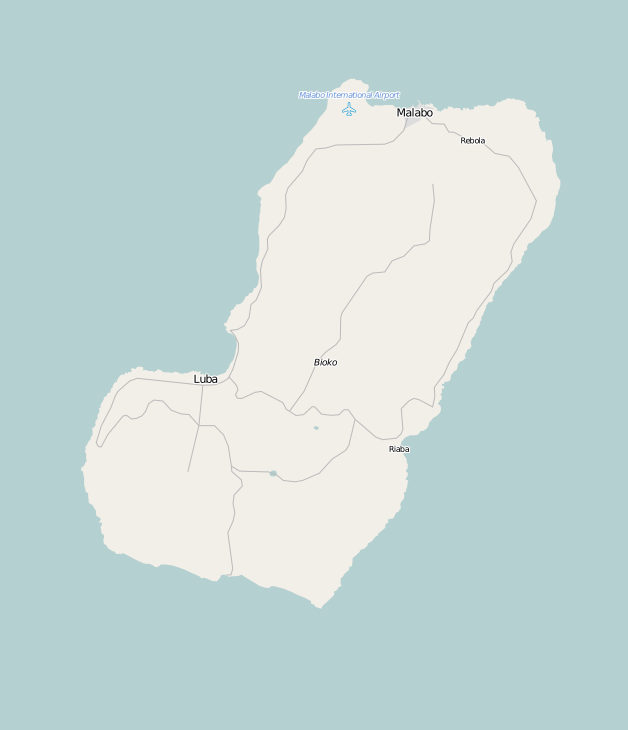
- Location in Bioko Rebola (Equatorial Guinea)
- Coordinates: 3°43′09″N 8°51′11″E
- Country: Equatorial Guinea
- Province: Bioko Norte

Population (2001)
  - Total: 8,259
- Climate: Am

Rebola is a town and the capital of the province of Bioko Norte, in Equatorial Guinea.

== Location and population ==
Located on Bioko, it is located east of Malabo, the former capital city of Equatorial Guinea. The population of Rebola was estimated at 8,259 in 2001.

== See also ==
- Geography of Equatorial Guinea
