= Micomeseng =

- Location in Equatorial Guinea
- Coordinates: 2°08′N 10°37′E
- Country: Equatorial Guinea
- Province: Kié-Ntem

Population (2005)
  - Total: 5,813
- Climate: Am

Micomeseng is a city in Equatorial Guinea. It is located in the province of Kié-Ntem and has a (2005 est.) population of 5,813.
