= San Antonio de Palé =

Coordinates: 1°24′25″S 5°37′56″E

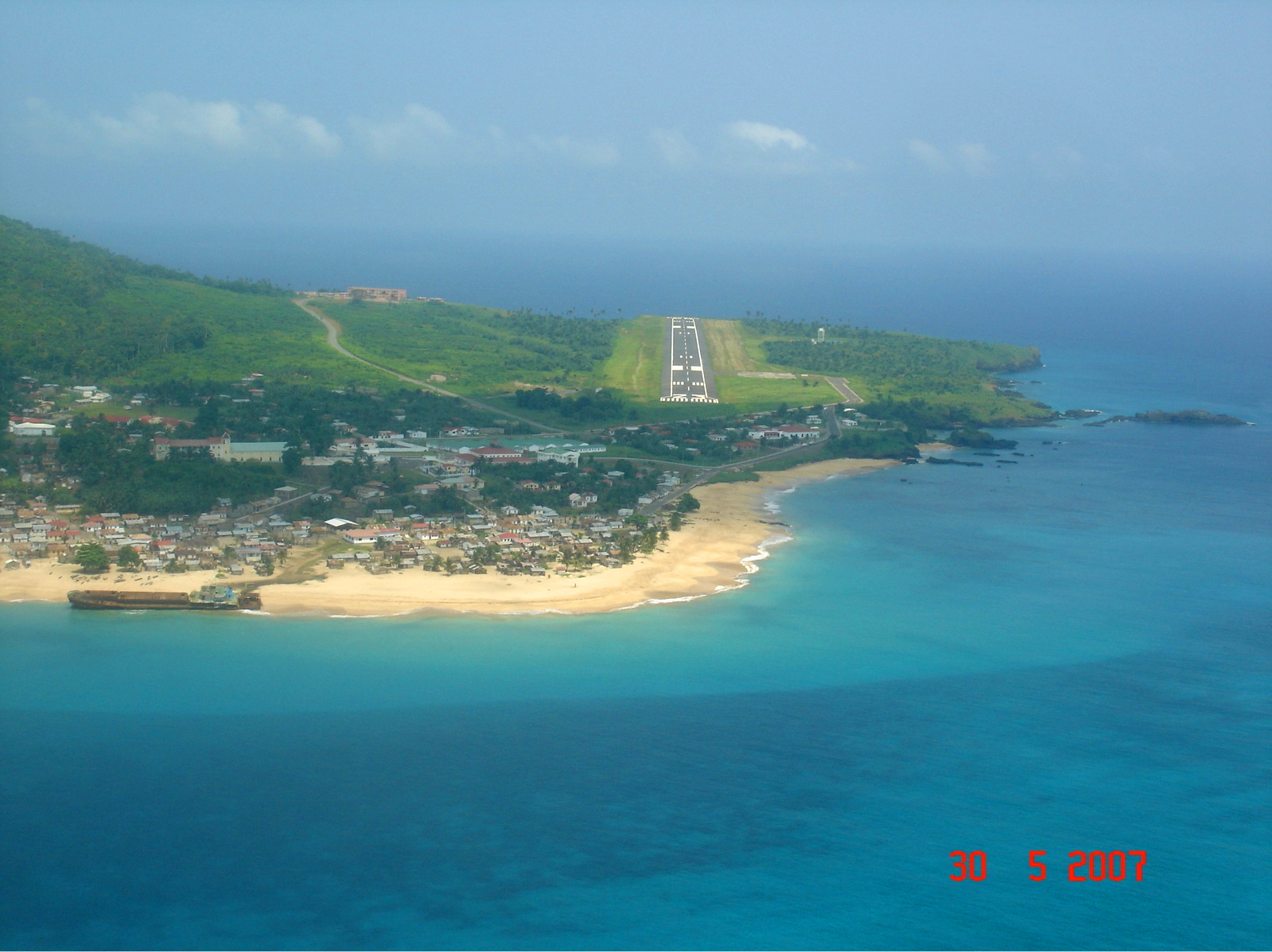
- The town with Annobón Airport to the right

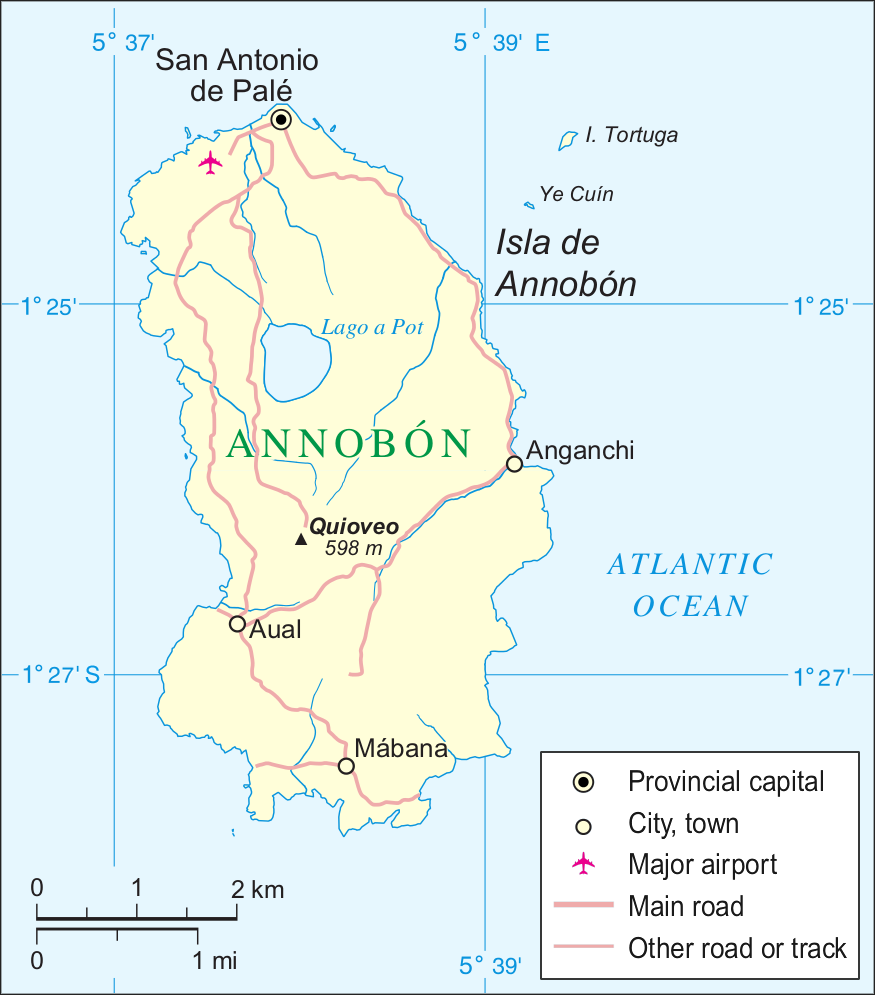
- Location of San Antonio de Palé on the island of Annobón
- Country: Equatorial Guinea
- Province: Annobón
- Elevation: 0 m (0 ft)

Population (2015 Census)
  - Total: 5,314

San Antonio de Palé, formerly known as St Antony, São Antonio de Praia and Palea, is the capital of Annobón (an island in Equatorial Guinea that was once part of the Spanish Empire in Africa).

The town has 600 inhabitants, the majority of whom speak the Annobonese Creole. It is located in the extreme north of the island, which is the driest and flattest area. It is home to Annobón Airport, a dock, a hospital, a school, a lighthouse, a radio station, and a Catholic mission.

== History ==
Founded by Portuguese explorers, the town served as a center of evangelization for runaway slaves from Angola. Capuchin and Carmelite missionaries first made the town their base in 1580. It passed under Spanish sovereignty in 1778, along with the rest of Annobón, but the population rebelled and removed Spanish authority until the final decades of the 19th century. In 1801, the British constructed a small fort there, and later on, in 1827, Spain rented out the area around San Antonio as a British base to repress the slave trade. The town remained a small village with only a rudimentary church through the 19th century.
