= Nsok =

- Town
- Location in Equatorial Guinea
- Coordinates: 1°8′N 11°16′E
- Country: Equatorial Guinea
- Province: Wele-Nzas

Population (2005)
  - Total: 4,620
- Climate: Aw

Nsork is a town in Equatorial Guinea. It is located in the province of Wele-Nzas and has a (2005 est.) population of 4,620.
