= Acurenam =

Akurenam
- Location in Equatorial Guinea
- Coordinates: 1°2′6″N 10°40′24″E
- Country: Equatorial Guinea
- Province: Centro Sur

Population (2008)
  - Total: 2,714
- Climate: As

Akurenam (Spanish: Akúrenam) is a town located on mainland Equatorial Guinea, in Centro Sur. Population 2,714 (2008 est.)

== Climate ==
Climate data for Acurenam
Month	Jan	Feb	Mar	Apr	May	Jun	Jul	Aug	Sep	Oct	Nov	Dec	Year
Mean daily maximum °C (°F)	27.4 (81.3)	28 (82)	28.1 (82.6)	27.9 (82.2)	27.4 (81.3)	26 (79)	24.8 (76.6)	25.3 (77.5)	26.2 (79.2)	26.7 (80.1)	26.7 (80.1)	26.7 (80.1)	26.8 (80.2)
Daily mean °C (°F)	22.8 (73.0)	23 (73)	22.9 (73.2)	23 (73)	22.8 (73.0)	21.8 (71.2)	20.6 (69.1)	20.9 (69.6)	21.7 (71.1)	22.2 (72.0)	22.2 (72.0)	22.6 (72.7)	22.2 (71.9)
Mean daily minimum °C (°F)	18.2 (64.8)	18 (64)	17.8 (64.0)	18.2 (64.8)	18.3 (64.9)	17.6 (63.7)	16.4 (61.5)	16.5 (61.7)	17.3 (63.1)	17.7 (63.9)	17.7 (63.9)	18.5 (65.3)	17.7 (63.8)
Average precipitation mm (inches)	131 (5.2)	184 (7.2)	294 (11.6)	254 (10.0)	217 (8.5)	68 (2.7)	6 (0.2)	22 (0.9)	195 (7.7)	383 (15.1)	298 (11.7)	176 (6.9)	2,228 (87.7)
Source: Climate-Data.org
