= Evinayong =

- Location of Evinayong in Equatorial Guinea Location of Evinayong in continental Equatorial Guinea
- Coordinates: 1°27′N 10°34′E
- Country: Equatorial Guinea
- Province: Centro Sur
- Elevation: 631 m (2,070 ft)

Population (2012)
  - City: 9,155
  - Metro: 36,500
- Climate: Am

Evinayong (Spanish: Evínayong [eˈβinajon]) is a town lying atop a small mountain in southeastern Río Muni, central Equatorial Guinea.

It is the capital of the Centro Sur Province and the St. Joseph's cathedral is the episcopal see of the Roman Catholic Diocese of Evinayong.

In 2001 it had a population of 7,997. It is known for its nightlife, its market and the nearby waterfalls. It also contains a prison.

== Notable residents ==
- Benjamín Enzema - Olympic sprinter who holds two national athletics records.
- Leandro Mbomio Nsue - Sculptor and artist and former head of the country's Education ministry.
- Guillermina Mekuy was born here in 1982. She is a writer who became a minister.
