= Ebibeyin =

- Location in Equatorial Guinea
- Coordinates: 2°09′N 11°19′E
- Country: Equatorial Guinea
- Province: Kié-Ntem
- Elevation: 390 m (1,280 ft)

Population (2012)
  - City: 36,565
  - Metro: 61,000
- Climate: Am

Ebibeyin (Spanish: Ebibeyín [eβiβeˈʝin]) is a town in the northeastern corner of mainland Equatorial Guinea. It is the capital of the province of Kié-Ntem.

It lies very close to the Equatorial Guinea–Gabon–Cameroon tripoint. It is the end point of three main transport routes coming from Bata, Yaoundé and major cities in central Gabon. Most of the city lies outside the de-jure boundaries of Equatorial Guinea.

== Religion ==
Ebibeyin Cathedral is the episcopal see of the Roman Catholic Diocese of Ebibeyin.

== Sports ==
Ebibeyin was a host city of the 2015 Africa Cup of Nations, for which the Estadio de Ebibeyin was built.

The Estadio serves as the home pitch for Akonangui FC, a multi-Equatoguinean Primera División and Equatoguinean Cup winner.
