= Luba, Equatorial Guinea =

Second-largest town on Bioko, Equatorial Guinea

Luba
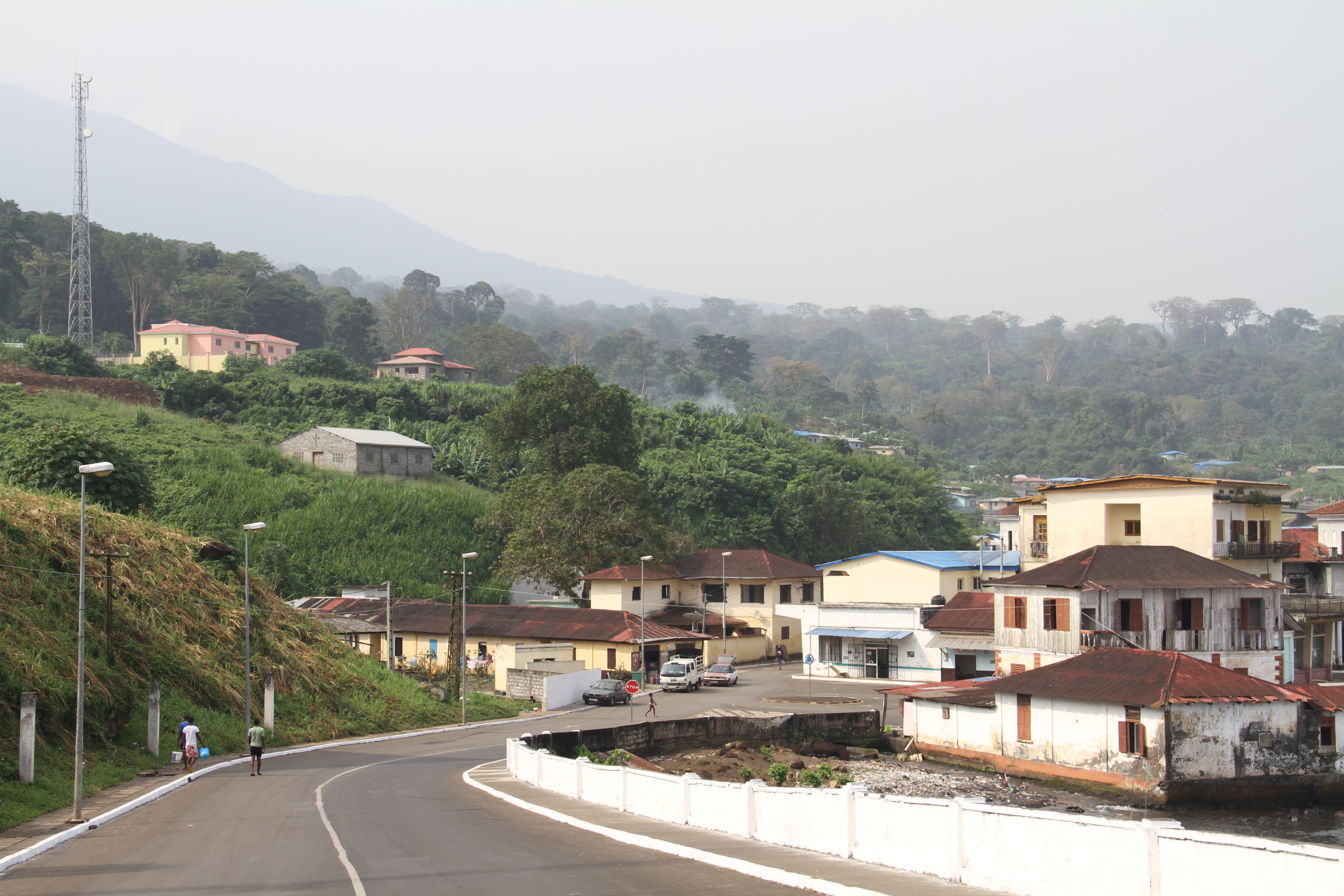
- Luba, 2013

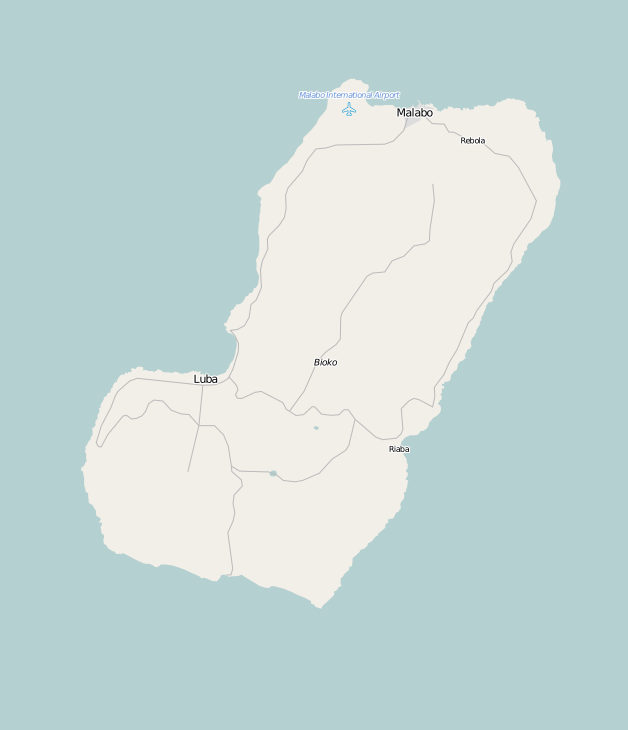
- Location in Bioko Luba (Equatorial Guinea)
- Coordinates: 3°27′N 8°33′E
- Country: Equatorial Guinea
- Province: Bioko Sur
- Elevation: 181 m (594 ft)

Population (2012)
  - City: 7,739
  - Metro: 24,000
- Climate: Am

Luba (formerly San Carlos) (pop. 7,000) is the second-largest town on Bioko in Equatorial Guinea, a port for the logging industry on the island's west coast beneath volcanic peaks. Attractions in Luba include several beaches and a colonial hospital.

The city may be reached either by sea or by a main road linking Luba to the country's capital, Malabo. The road is now accessible; it takes about an hour to drive from Malabo to Luba. In 1999, a free port opened near the town, creating deepwater access for larger and oil industry vessels, an alternative to the congested port of Malabo for re-supplying on fuel, water and other materials. As of 2010 a new highway was under construction from Luba via Belebú Balachá through the Luba Crater Scientific Reserve to Ureca near the south coast.
