= Bioko Sur =

Province of Equatorial Guinea

- Province
- Coordinates: 3°26′24″N 8°38′24″E
- Country: Equatorial Guinea
- Capital: Luba

Area
  - Total: 1,241 km^{2} (479 sq mi)

Population (2015)
  - Total: 34,674
  - Density: 27.94/km^{2} (72.37/sq mi)
- ISO 3166 code: GQ-BS

A clickable map of Equatorial Guinea exhibiting its two regions and eight provinces. The island nation of São Tomé and Príncipe is not part of Equatorial Guinea.

Bioko Sur (Spanish pronunciation: [ˈbjo.ko suɾ] Spanish for "South Bioko") is a province of Equatorial Guinea. Its capital is Luba. It occupies the southern part of the island of Bioko, the remainder of which is part of Bioko Norte. The province is sub-divided into 2 districts - Luba in the west of the island (with 26,331 inhabitants in 2015) and Riaba in the east (with 8,343 inhabitants in 2015).

Part of the Parque Nacional del Pico Basilé, created in 2000, is in Bioko Sur.
