= Wele-Nzas =

Province of Equatorial Guinea

Coordinates: 1°30′N 11°00′E

Wele-nzas
- Province
- Country: Equatorial Guinea
- Capital: Mongomo

Area
  - Total: 5,026 km^{2} (1,941 sq mi)

Population (2015)
  - Total: 192,017
  - Density: 38.20/km^{2} (98.95/sq mi)

Wele-nzas (Spanish: Wele Nsas or Welensas) is a province in the eastern portion of continental Equatorial Guinea. Its capital is Mongomo. It borders the Equatoguinean provinces of Centro Sur to the west and Kie-ntem to the north, with Gabon's Woleu-Ntem Province to the east and south. As of 2015, the population of Wele-nzas was 192,017. It derives its name from the Benito River (also called the Wele) and the Piedra Nzas mountain range.

== History ==
The earliest settlers of Wele-Nzas, and the only inhabitants of the region for nearly 15,000 years, were the Gyele (Byele) peoples. Bantu migration ultimately displaced the Gyele, and during the 20th century the last of the Gyele migrated to Cameroon. The Fang people ultimately became the predominant ethnic group in the province. As European explorers mostly avoided the interior of Equatorial Guinea, there are few accounts of the region in early European histories; even the Spanish governors of the region did not visit Wele-Nzas until the official formation of Spanish Guinea in 1926.

Wele-Nzas has played an important role in post-independence Equatoguinean history as the home province of both of the country's presidents, Francisco Macías Nguema and Teodoro Obiang Nguema Mbasogo. From 1975 until the 1979 Equatorial Guinea coup d'état, Macías led his totalitarian rule of the nation from his hometown of Nsangayong on the border with Gabon. Obiang has initiated several major infrastructure projects in the province, including a new airport and conference center in Mongomo. Djibloho, the newest province of Equatorial Guinea, was carved out of Wele-Nzas in 2017. Ciudad de la Paz (formerly Oyala), the planned future capital city of Equatorial Guinea, is being built in Djibloho.

== Geography ==
A clickable map of Equatorial Guinea exhibiting its two regions and eight provinces. The island nation of São Tomé and Príncipe is not part of Equatorial Guinea.

Mongomo is the largest city in the province; other major cities include Aconibe, Añisoc, and Nsok. A major highway links Mongomo to the port city of Bata, and a border crossing near the city connects it to the Gabonese city of Oyem.

The city of Mengomeyén is home to the province's main airport, President Obiang Nguema International Airport.

Two national parks, Altos de Nsork National Park and Monte Temelón Natural Reserve, are located within the province.

Acoacán is the birth place of president Teodoro Obiang.
