= Centro Sur =

Province of Equatorial Guinea

Coordinates: 1.55°N 10.29°E

- Province
- Country: Equatorial Guinea
- Capital: Evinayong

Area
  - Total: 9,931 km^{2} (3,834 sq mi)

Population (2015)
  - Total: 141,986
  - Density: 14.30/km^{2} (37.03/sq mi)

Centro Sur (Spanish for "South Central") is a province of Equatorial Guinea, the largest province in the country by area. Its capital is Evinayong.

== Geography ==
A clickable map of Equatorial Guinea exhibiting its two regions and eight provinces. The island nation of São Tomé and Príncipe is not part of Equatorial Guinea.

Centro Sur borders Gabon's Estuaire Province in the southwest and Woleu-Ntem Province in the southeast, and Cameroon's South Province in the north. Domestically, it borders Kié-Ntem in the northeast, Wele-Nzas in the southeast, and Litoral in the west.

Centro Sur contains three main towns: Akurenam, Niefang and Evinayong.
