= Litoral (Equatorial Guinea) =

Province of Equatorial Guinea

- Province
- Coordinates: 1.54°N 9.80°E
- Country: Equatorial Guinea
- Capital: Bata

Area
  - Total: 6,665 km^{2} (2,573 sq mi)

Population (2015)
  - Total: 367,348
  - Density: 55.12/km^{2} (142.7/sq mi)
- ISO 3166 code: GQ-LI

A clickable map of Equatorial Guinea exhibiting its two regions and eight provinces. The island nation of São Tomé and Príncipe is not part of Equatorial Guinea.

Litoral (Spanish pronunciation: [litoˈɾal], meaning "Coastal [Province]") is the most populous province of Equatorial Guinea, recording a population of 367,348 in the 2015 national census. Its capital is Bata; the other two cities are Mbini and Kogo.

Litoral's western border is the Gulf of Guinea coast. It is the only coastal province of Río Muni. On land, it borders the following country subdivisions:

- South Province, Cameroon—north
- Centro Sur, Equatorial Guinea—east
- Estuaire Province, Gabon—south
