= Kié-Ntem =

Province of Equatorial Guinea

Coordinates: 2°00′N 11°00′E

Kie-ntem
- Province
- Country: Equatorial Guinea
- Capital: Ebibeyin

Area
  - Total: 3,943 km^{2} (1,522 sq mi)

Population (2015)
  - Total: 183,664
  - Density: 46.58/km^{2} (120.6/sq mi)

A clickable map of Equatorial Guinea exhibiting its two regions and eight provinces. The island nation of São Tomé and Príncipe is not part of Equatorial Guinea.

Kie-ntem or Kie Ntem (Spanish: Kientem) is a province of Equatorial Guinea. Its capital is Ebibeyin.

Kie-ntem borders the following country subdivisions:

- South Region, Cameroon - north
- Woleu-Ntem Province, Gabon - east
- Wele-nzas, Equatorial Guinea - south
- Centro sur, Equatorial Guinea - west

The province takes its name from the River Kié and Ntem River (Campo).
