= Provinces of Equatorial Guinea =

Equatorial Guinea is divided into two regions and eight provinces (Spanish: provincias, French: provinces, Portuguese: províncias). The newest province is Djibloho, created in 2017 with its headquarters at Ciudad de la Paz, the country's new capital.

== Regions ==
1. Insular Region (capital at Malabo)
2. Continental Region (capital at Bata)

== Provinces ==
A clickable map of Equatorial Guinea exhibiting its two regions and eight provinces. The island nation of São Tomé and Príncipe is not part of Equatorial Guinea.

Annobón, Bioko Norte and Bioko Sur are in the Insular Region; the other five provinces are in the Continental Region.

| Province | Capital | Population (2015) | Area (km^{2}) |
|---|---|---|---|
| Annobón | San Antonio de Palé | 5,314 | 17 |
| Bioko Norte | Rebola | 300,374 | 776 |
| Bioko Sur | Luba | 34,674 | 1,241 |
| Centro Sur | Evinayong | 141,986 | 9,931 |
| Kié-Ntem | Ebibeyin | 183,664 | 3,943 |
| Litoral | Bata | 367,348 | 6,666 |
| Wele-Nzas | Mongomo | 192,017 | 5,026 |
| Djibloho | Ciudad de la Paz | – | 453 |

== Subdivisions ==
The provinces are further divided into 19 districts and 37 municipalities.

== See also ==
- ISO 3166-2:GQ – Entry for Equatorial Guinea in ISO 3166-2
- List of cities in Equatorial Guinea
- Municipalities of Equatorial Guinea
- Subdivisions of Equatorial Guinea
