= List of companies of Equatorial Guinea =

Location of Equatorial Guinea

Equatorial Guinea is a country located in Central Africa, with an area of 28,000 square kilometres (11,000 sq mi). Formerly the colony of Spanish Guinea, its post-independence name evokes its location near both the Equator and the Gulf of Guinea. The discovery of large oil reserves in 1996 and its subsequent exploitation have contributed to a dramatic increase in government revenue. As of 2004, Equatorial Guinea is the third-largest oil producer in Sub-Saharan Africa. Its oil production has risen to 360,000 barrels per day (57,000 m^{3}/d), up from 220,000 only two years earlier.

Forestry, farming, and fishing are also major components of GDP. Subsistence farming predominates. The deterioration of the rural economy under successive brutal regimes has diminished any potential for agriculture-led growth.

== Notable firms ==
This list includes notable companies with primary headquarters located in the country. The industry and sector follow the Industry Classification Benchmark taxonomy. Organizations which have ceased operations are included and noted as defunct.

Notable companies Status: P=Private, S=State; A=Active, D=Defunct
Name	Industry	Sector	Headquarters	Founded	Notes	Status	
Ceiba Intercontinental Airlines	Consumer services	Airlines	Malabo	2007	Airline	P	A
Cronos Airlines	Consumer services	Airlines	Malabo	2007	Airline	P	A
Ecuato Guineana	Consumer services	Airlines	Malabo	1986	State airline	S	A
EG LNG	Oil & gas	Exploration & production	Malabo	2007	Oil & gas	P	A
GEPetrol	Oil & gas	Exploration & production	Malabo	2002	National oil company	S	A
Guinea Ecuatorial Airlines	Consumer services	Airlines	Malabo	1996	Airline	P	A
Segesa	Utilities	Conventional electricity	Malabo	2001	Power utility	P	A
Sonagas	Oil & gas	Exploration & production	Malabo	2005	Oil & gas	P	A

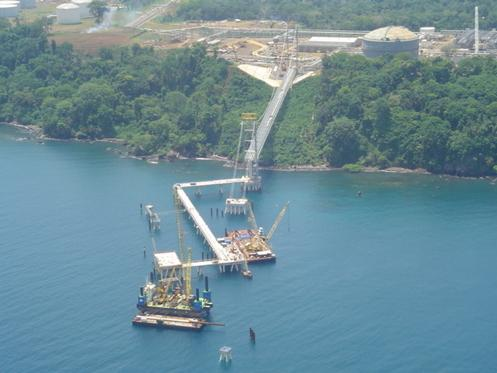
The suspension bridge and shipping terminal of the EG LNG liquefied natural gas company.

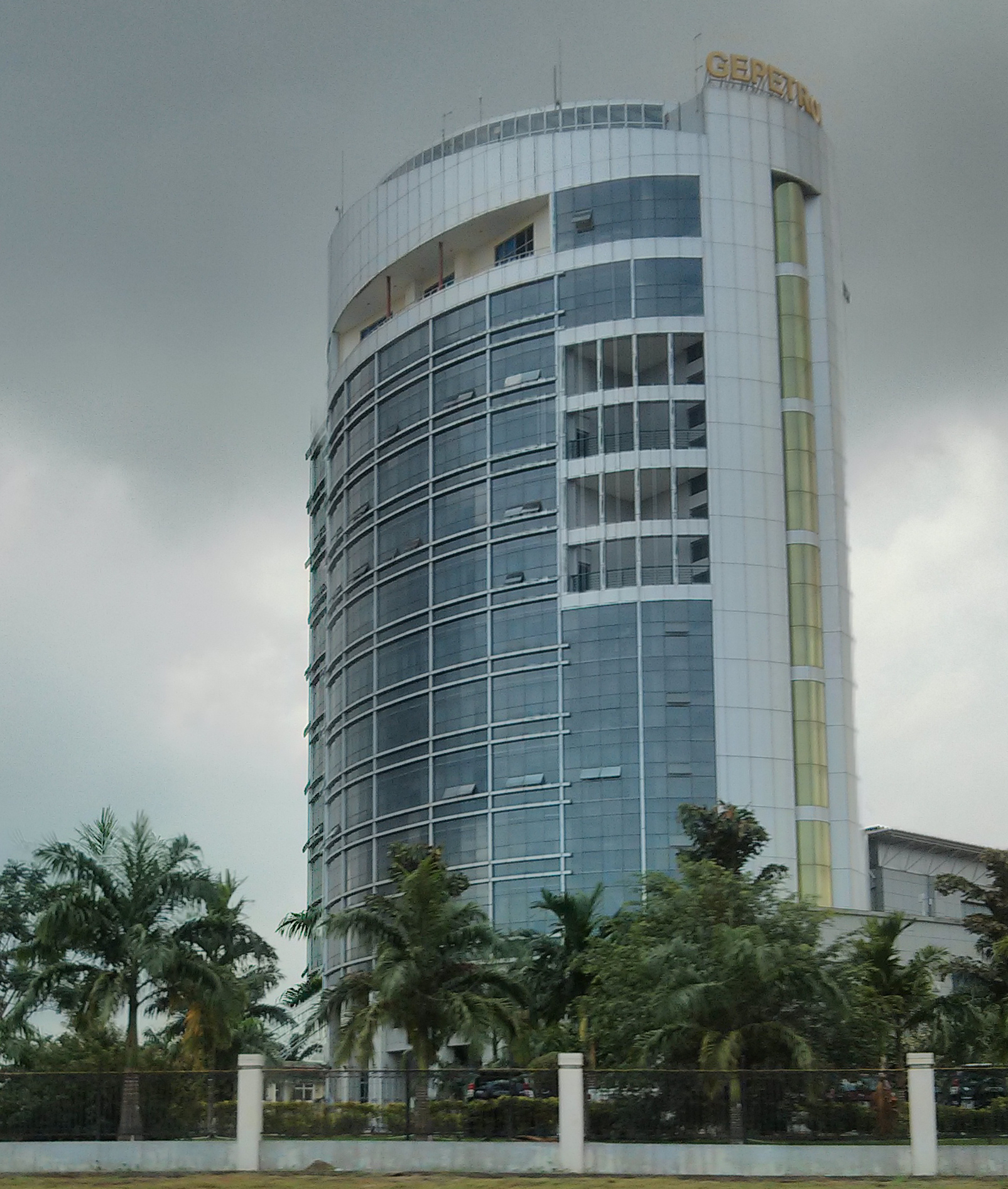
Headquarters of GEPetrol in Malabo

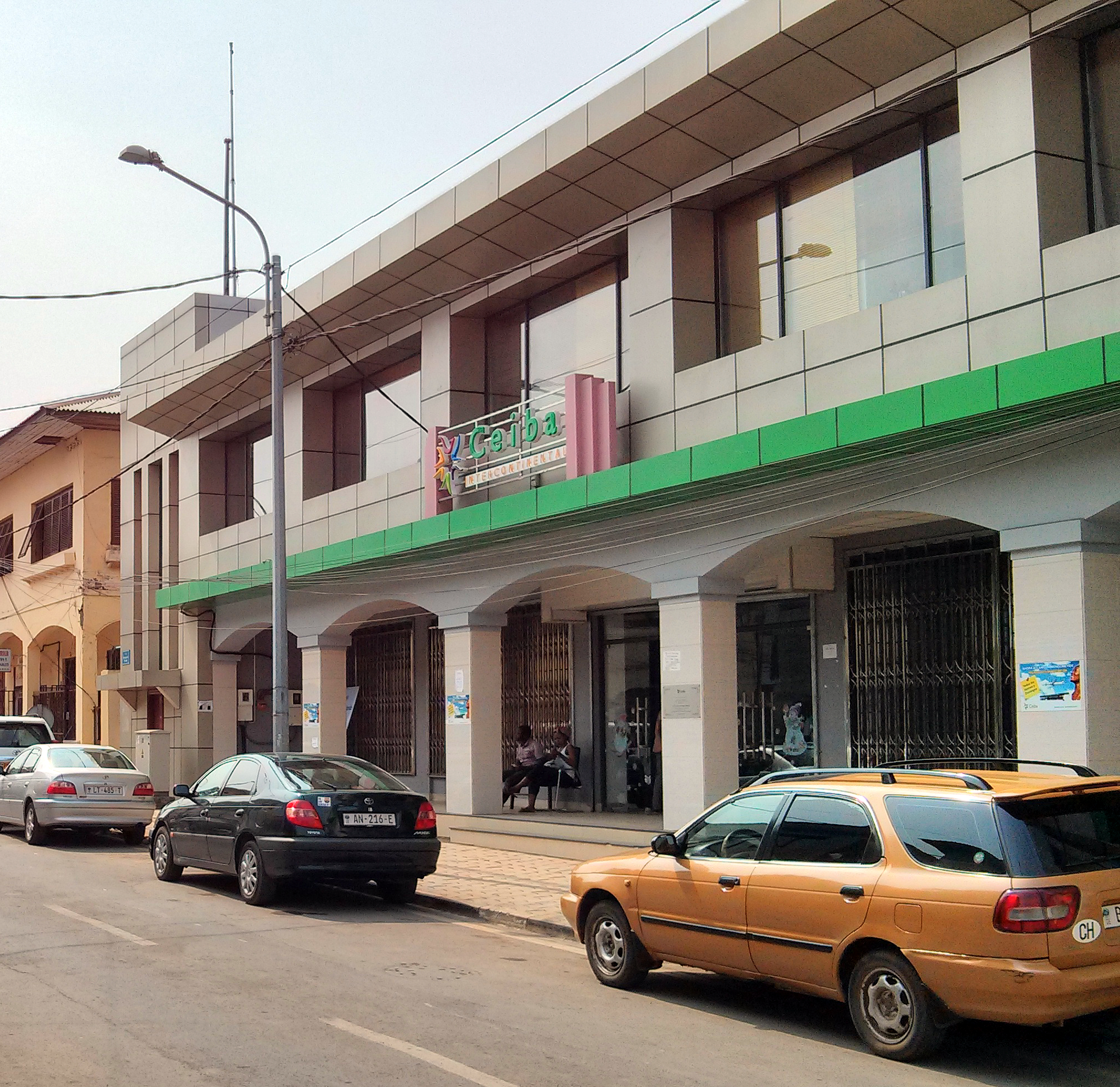
CEIBA Intercontinental headquarters in Malabo.

== See also ==
- List of airlines of Equatorial Guinea
- List of banks in Equatorial Guinea
