= List of airports in Equatorial Guinea =

This is a list of airports in Equatorial Guinea, sorted by location.

== Airports ==
City served	Province	ICAO	IATA	Airport name	Coordinates
Bata	Litoral	FGBT	BSG	Bata Airport	01°54′20″N 009°48′20″E
Corisco Island	Litoral	FGCO	OCS	Corisco International Airport	0°54′55″N 9°19′50″E
Malabo	Bioko Norte	FGSL	SSG	Malabo International Airport	03°45′19″N 008°42′31″E
San Antonio de Palé	Annobón	FGAN	NBN	Annobón Airport	01°24′37″S 005°37′19″E
Mengomeyén	Wele-Nzas Province	FGMY	GEM	President Obiang Nguema International Airport	01°41′24″N 011°01′26″E
Mongomo	Wele-Nzas Province	FGMM		Mongomo Airport	1.636607°N 11.302458°E
Ciudad de la Paz	Djibloho Province			Lapazia Airport	1.5792086202066506°N 10.849198987364668°E

== See also ==
- Transport in Equatorial Guinea
- List of airports by ICAO code: F#FG - Equatorial Guinea
- Wikipedia: WikiProject Aviation/Airline destination lists: Africa#Equatorial Guinea
