= Mary Wangari Wamae =

Kenyan lawyer and corporate executive

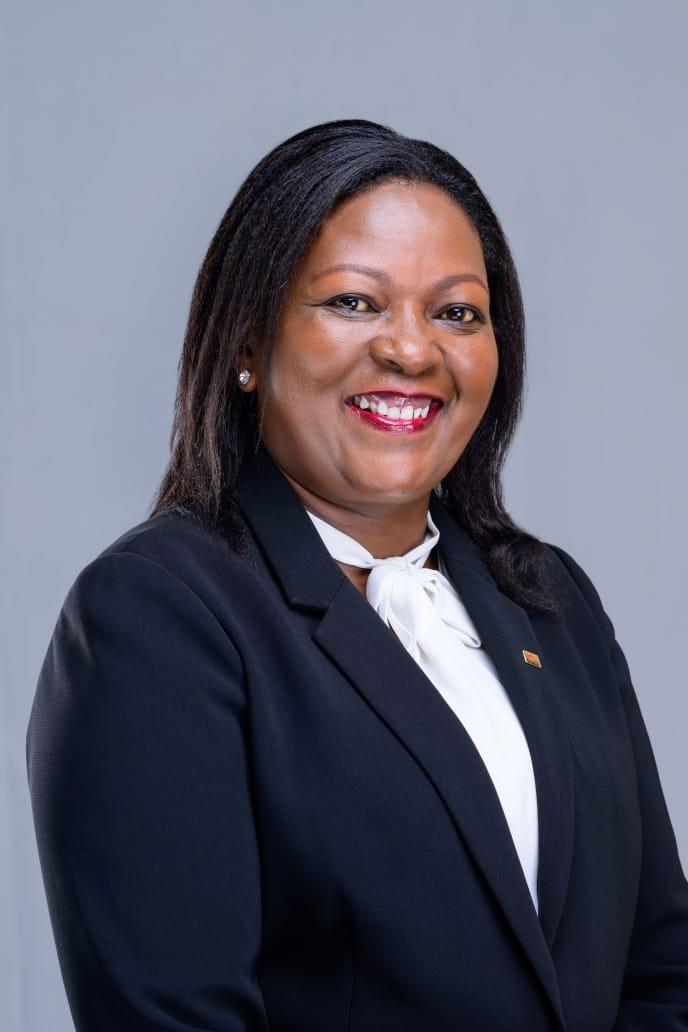
- Citizenship: Kenya
- Education: University of Nairobi; Kenya School of Law; York St John University
- Occupations: Lawyer and Corporate Executive
- Years active: Since 1992
- Title: Executive Director at Equity Group Holdings

Mary Wangari Wamae, commonly known as Mary Wamae, is a lawyer, businesswoman and corporate executive from Kenya. She was the executive director at Equity Group Holdings, a financial services conglomerate based in Kenya, with subsidiaries in the countries of the African Great Lakes area. She joined the then building society in 2004 as the Head of Legal Services before her promotion to Company Secretary and Head of Legal Services in 2005. In 2008, Mary Wamae rose to become Director of Corporate Strategy, Legal Services and Company Secretary and in 2012 became Group Company Secretary, Director of Corporate Strategy and Legal Services. In 2014, Mrs. Wamae was promoted to Group Director of Strategy, Legal Services and Group Company Secretary, a position she held until 2017. Mary was appointed as Group Executive Director in 2017 until her retirement in June 2024.

== Early life and education ==
Wamae was born and raised in a rural setting, in present-day Nyeri County. She, along with one sister and four brothers were raised by a single mother whose main source of income was peasant agriculture.

She holds a Bachelor of Laws (LLB) degree from The University of Nairobi. She went on to obtain a Diploma in Law from the Kenya School of Law and a Post Graduate diploma in Gender & Development, obtained from the University of Nairobi. She was also admitted to the Kenya Bar.

She was awarded a master's degree in Leadership Innovation and Change, by York St John University, in Nottingham, United Kingdom. Mary Wamae has also participated in executive education programs, including IESE Business School - Strathmore Business School - Advanced Management Program (2006), the Advanced Management Programme (AMP) at Harvard Business School (2018) and the Oxford Women's Leadership Development Programme at the University of Oxford (April 2024).

== Career ==
Before joining Equity Bank in 2004, Wamae was a Partner in the law firm of Mary Wangari & Company Advocates, which she had founded and led since 1996.

She joined the financial institution when it was still Equity Building Society, and served as the Head of Legal Services. The following year, her responsibility was expanded to include the role of Company Secretary.

Her responsibilities progressively increased over the years. Before she took up her current assignment, her position was described as Group Director of Strategy, Legal Services and Group Company Secretary. The company split that position and hired two people to replace her.

In her role as executive director for the banking group, she oversees the group's subsidiaries in DR Congo, Rwanda, South Sudan, Tanzania and Uganda.

Currently, she is the founder of TVG Leadership and Consulting Group a consulting and leadership group that focuses on corporate governance, corporate consultancy, leadership and mentorship.

== Family ==
She is a mother of three daughters.

== Autobiography ==
She has published her autobiography under the cover name of THE VILLAGE GIRL: MY DREAM, LIFE AND LEGACY. https://read.amazon.com/kp/embed?asin=B0CCSPB4SM&preview=newtab&linkCode=kpe&ref_=cm_sw_r_kb_dp_SN2RFV1K9N44G1QEBK6K

== See also ==
- Eva Ngigi–Sarwari
- Julia Carvalho
- Iddah Asin
