= Bata Airport =

Airport in Bata, Equatorial Guinea

Bata Airport Aeropuerto de Bata
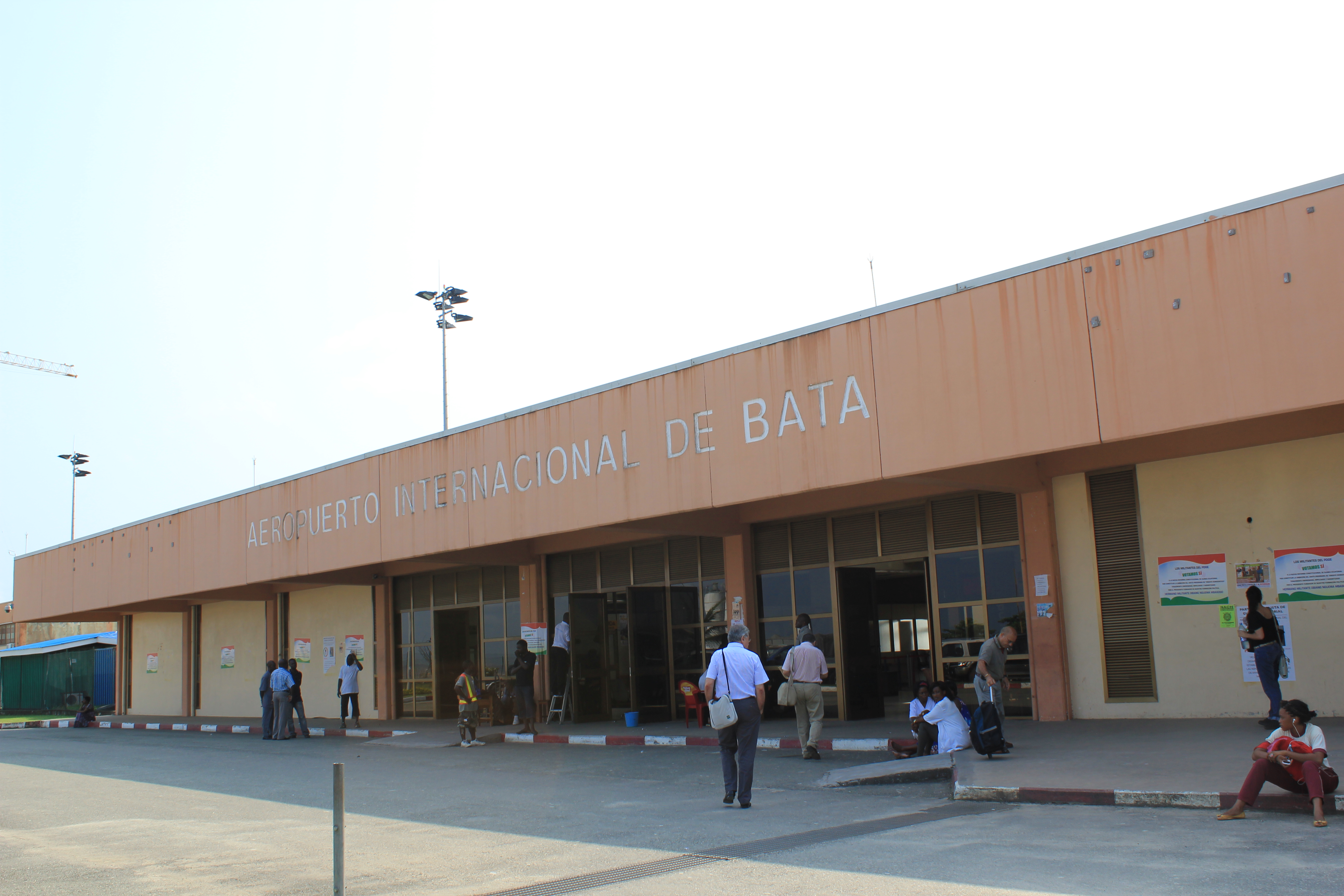
- IATA: BSG; ICAO: FGBT

Summary
- Airport type: Public
- Operator: Aeropuertos De Guinea Ecuatorial (ADGE)
- Location: Bata, Equatorial Guinea
- Elevation AMSL: 13 ft / 4 m
- Coordinates: 1°54′20″N 9°48′20″E

Map
- Location of airport in Equatorial Guinea

Runways
Direction	Length		Surface
Direction	m	ft	Surface
03/21	3,310	10,860	Asphalt

Statistics (2020)
- Passengers: 253,678
- Flights: 6,087
- Sources: GCM, INEGE

Bata Airport (IATA: BSG, ICAO: FGBT) is an airport serving Bata in Litoral, Equatorial Guinea. It is the second largest airport in Equatorial Guinea after Malabo International Airport.

== Overview ==
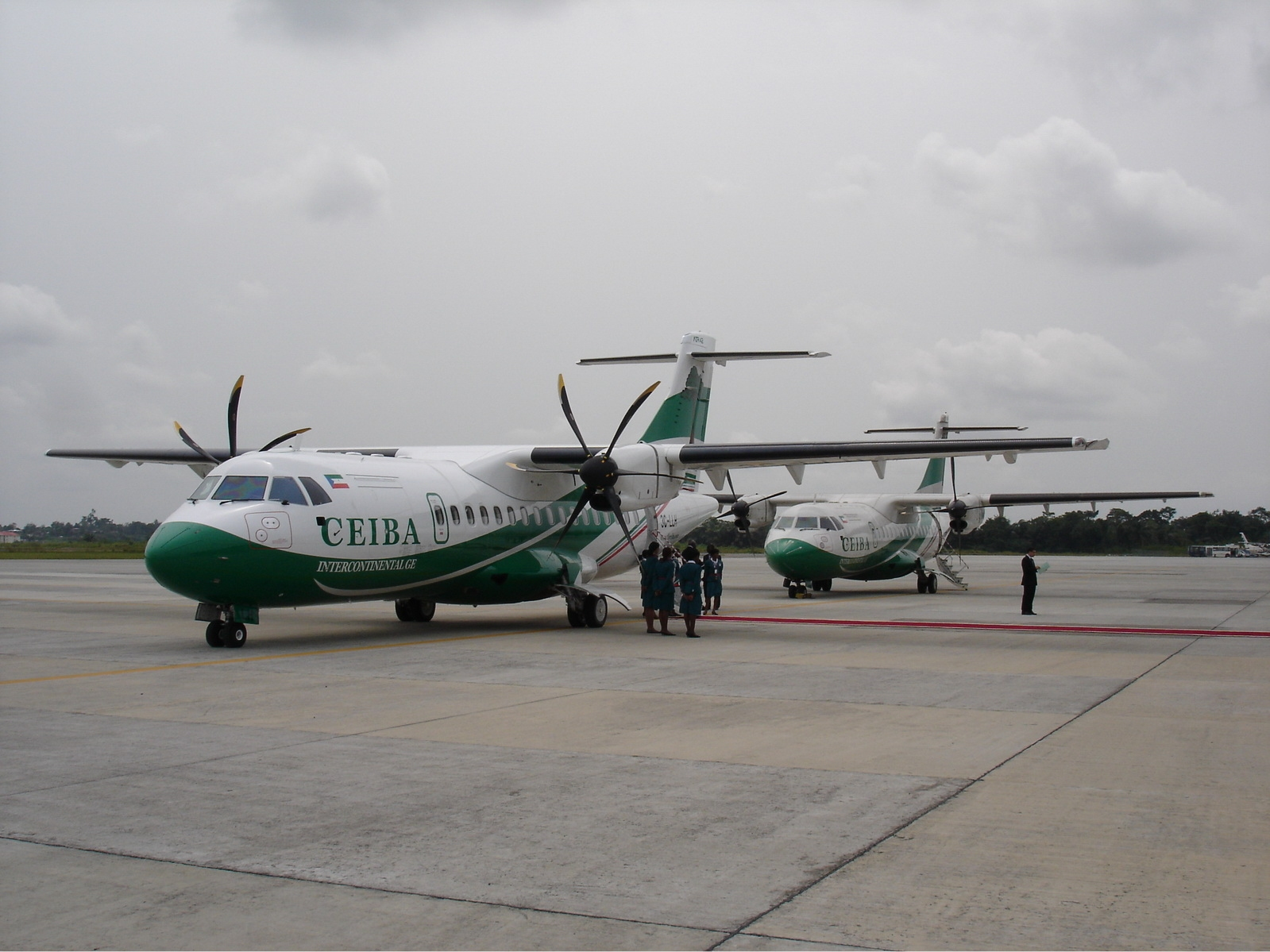
CEIBA Intercontinental ATR 42s at Bata Airport

The airport is 4 kilometres (2.5 mi) north of Bata and 3.8 kilometres (2.4 mi) south of Utonde. It has a 3310-metre runway that operates only during the daytime and in good light. The state carrier and four other private companies make up the majority of Bata's industry, transporting passengers from Bioko's Malabo International Airport or the airports at Annobón or Mongomo. The airport is large enough to accommodate a Boeing 737. Despite that, with the long runway, large twinjets such as the Airbus A350 and the Boeing 787 can take-off and land here, as seen in 2020 when Vietnam Airlines used an A350-900 to bring stranded Vietnamese citizens home. Bata served 15,000 passengers in 2001.

In July 2002, all staff at the airport were arrested for allowing the leader of the Popular Union, an opposition party, to board a flight to Gabon.

== Airlines and destinations ==
Airlines	Destinations
Afrijet	Libreville
CEIBA Intercontinental	Malabo
Cronos Airlines	Malabo

== See also ==
- List of airports in Equatorial Guinea
- Transport in Equatorial Guinea
