= Annobón Airport =

Airport in Equatorial Guinea

Annobón Airport Aeropuerto de Annobón
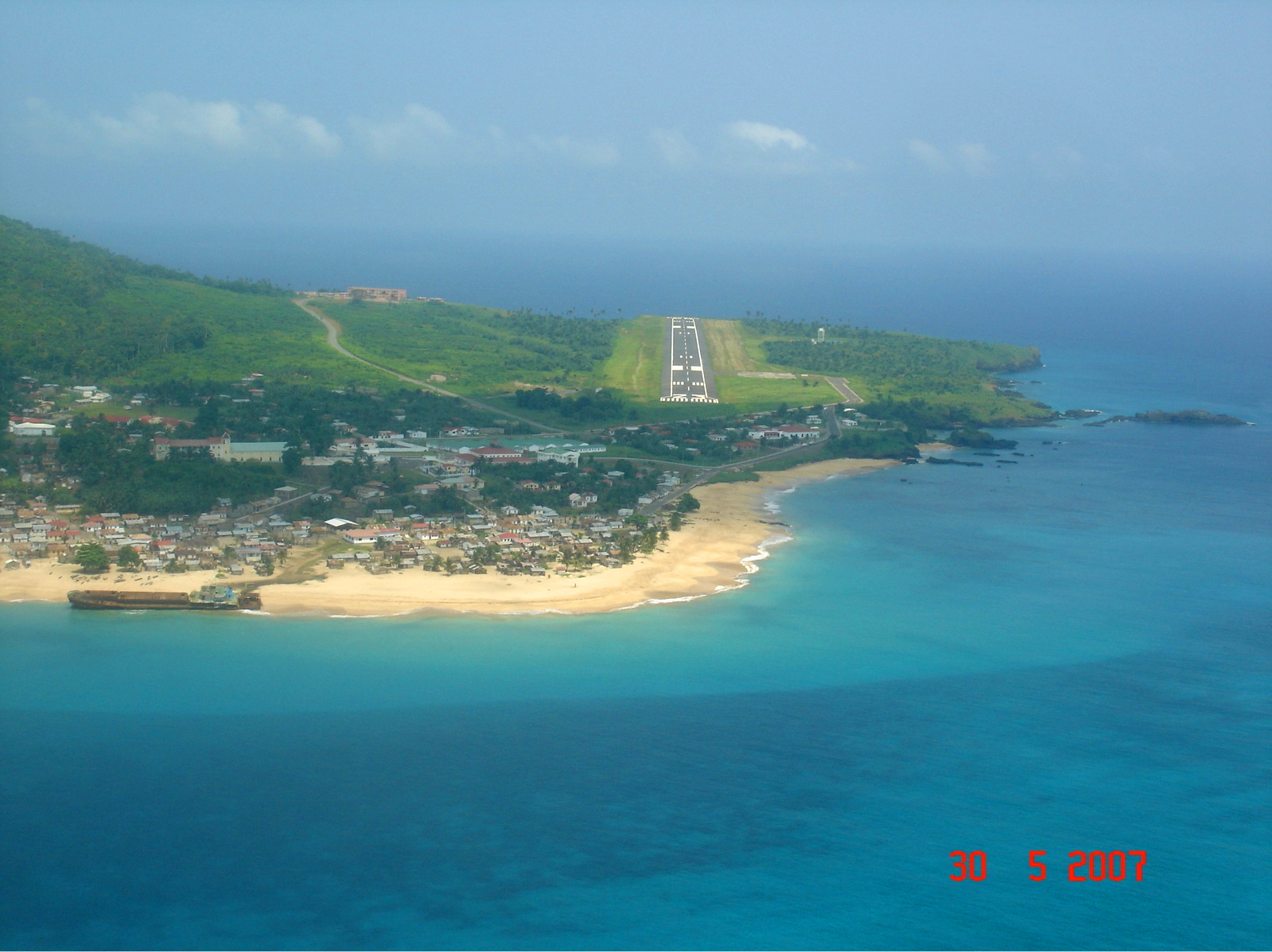
- San Antonio de Palé and Annobón Airport
- IATA: NBN; ICAO: FGAN

Summary
- Airport type: Public
- Operator: Aeropuertos De Guinea Ecuatorial (ADGE)
- Serves: San Antonio de Palé, Annobón Island
- Elevation AMSL: 82 ft / 25 m
- Coordinates: 1°24′37″S 5°37′19″E

Map
- Location of the airport in Equatorial Guinea

Runways
Direction	Length		Surface
Direction	m	ft	Surface
05/23	1,890	6,201	Concrete
- Sources: GCM Google Maps

Annobón Airport (IATA: NBN, ICAO: FGAN) is an airport in San Antonio de Palé, Annobón, Equatorial Guinea.

== Overview ==
The airport is west of San Antonio de Palé on the southern island of Annobón. It was inaugurated October 15, 2010, in the presence of Teodoro Obiang Nguema Mbasogo, the President of Equatorial Guinea. CEIBA Intercontinental provides weekly service to Malabo.

== Airlines and destinations ==
Airlines	Destinations
CEIBA Intercontinental	Malabo

== See also ==
- List of airports in Equatorial Guinea
- Transport in Equatorial Guinea
