= Corisco International Airport =

Airport in Equatorial Guinea

Corisco International Airport Aeropuerto Internacional de Corisco
- IATA: OCS; ICAO: FGCO

Summary
- Airport type: Public
- Serves: Corisco, Equatorial Guinea
- Opened: 10 October 2011
- Time zone: Africa/Malabo (UTC +1)
- Elevation AMSL: 55 ft / 17 m
- Coordinates: 0°55′00″N 9°19′50″E

Map
- Location of the airport in Equatorial Guinea

Runways
Direction	Length		Surface
Direction	m	ft	Surface
01/19	3,115	10,220	Concrete
- Sources: GCM Google Maps

Corisco International Airport (IATA: OCS, ICAO: FGCO), or just Corisco Airport, is an airport serving the island of Corisco in the Litoral Province of Equatorial Guinea. It was opened on 10 October 2011.

The airport is 26 nautical miles (48 km) north of the Libreville VOR-DME (ident: LV), and the field elevation is 17 m (55 ft).

== History ==
The airport was originally conceived as part of a project aiming to turn the island of Corisco into an important centre of tourism. The Moroccan construction company Somagec was placed in charge of the construction of the site.

The second vice prime minister Demetrio Eló Ndong Nsefumu visited the Corisco Island airport on 5 October 2011 to personally verify the facility's construction progress.

On 10 October, the president of Equatorial Guinea and the first lady met there, accompanied by the president of Gabon, Ali Bongo Ondimba, who was the guest of honour at the opening ceremony of the new airport. The ministers and members of the Government of Equatorial Guinea and diplomatic representatives from countries including Spain, Morocco, the United States, China, and Cuba were also present. Several elders from the island also took part in the inauguration, along with the mayor of Corisco, the director of Somagec, prime minister Ignacio Milam Tang, and the second vice prime minister Demetrio Eló Ndong Nsefumu. The president gave a speech on the importance of the new airport's impact on tourism. After the opening ceremony, the presidents of Equatorial Guinea and Gabon, together with the Equatoguinean first lady, prime minister, and the rest of the guests from the government, toured the modern facilities of the new airport.

== See also ==
- List of airports in Equatorial Guinea
- Transport in Equatorial Guinea
