= 2015 Senegal mid-air collision =

Aviation accident over Senegal

Accident
- Date: 5 September 2015
- Summary: Mid-air collision
- Site: Approx 130 km (80 mi) east of Tambacounda, Senegal; 13.53°N 12.48°W
- Total fatalities: 7
- Total survivors: 112

First aircraft
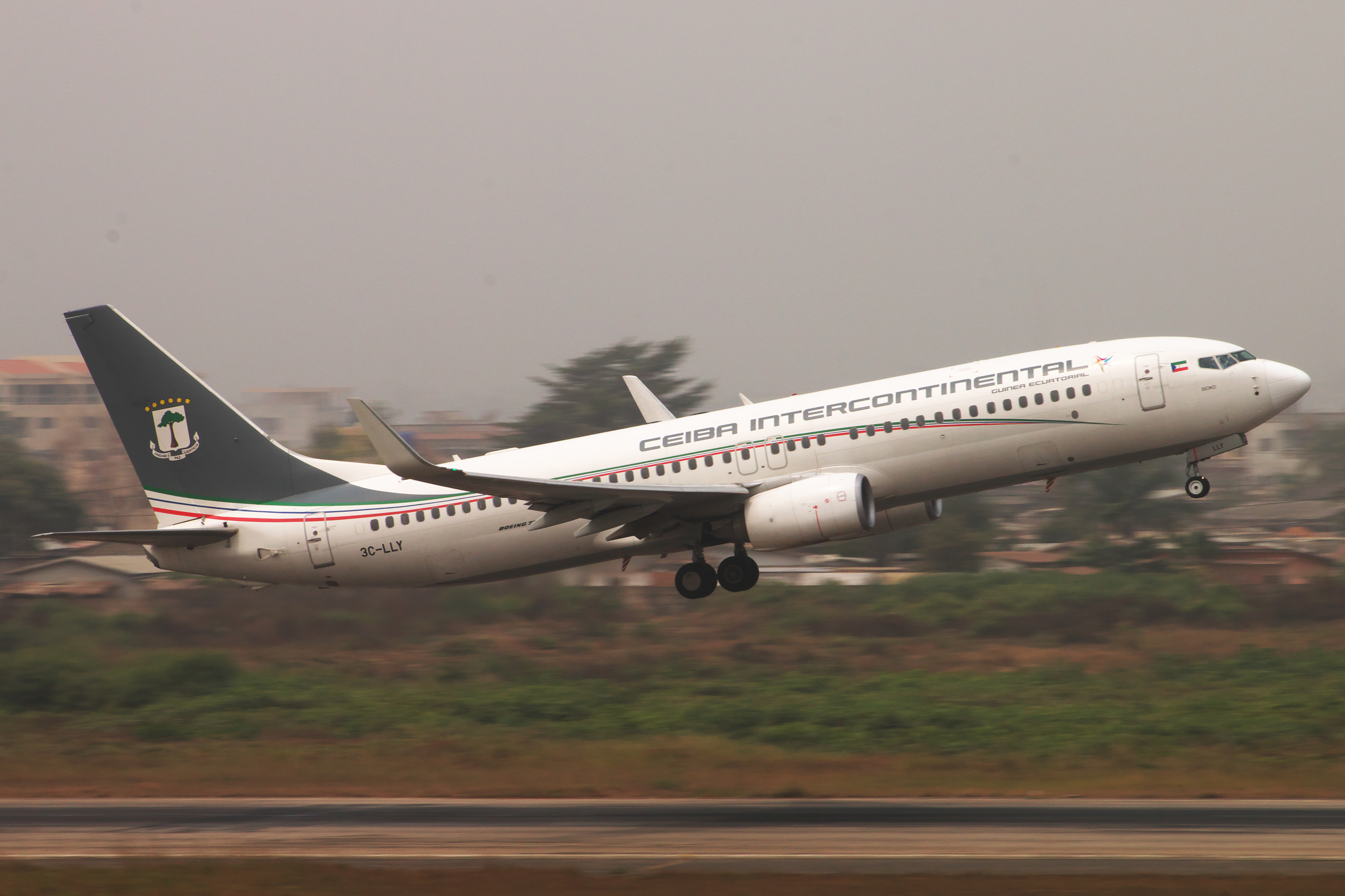
- 3C-LLY, the Boeing 737-8FB involved in the collision, pictured in 2016 after being repaired
- Type: Boeing 737-8FB
- Operator: CEIBA Intercontinental
- IATA flight No.: C271
- ICAO flight No.: CEL071
- Call sign: CEIBA LINE 071
- Registration: 3C-LLY
- Flight origin: Léopold Sédar Senghor International Airport, Dakar, Senegal
- Stopover: Cotonou Cadjehoun Airport, Cotonou, Benin
- Destination: Malabo International Airport, Malabo, Equatorial Guinea
- Occupants: 112
- Passengers: 104
- Crew: 8
- Fatalities: 0
- Survivors: 112

Second aircraft
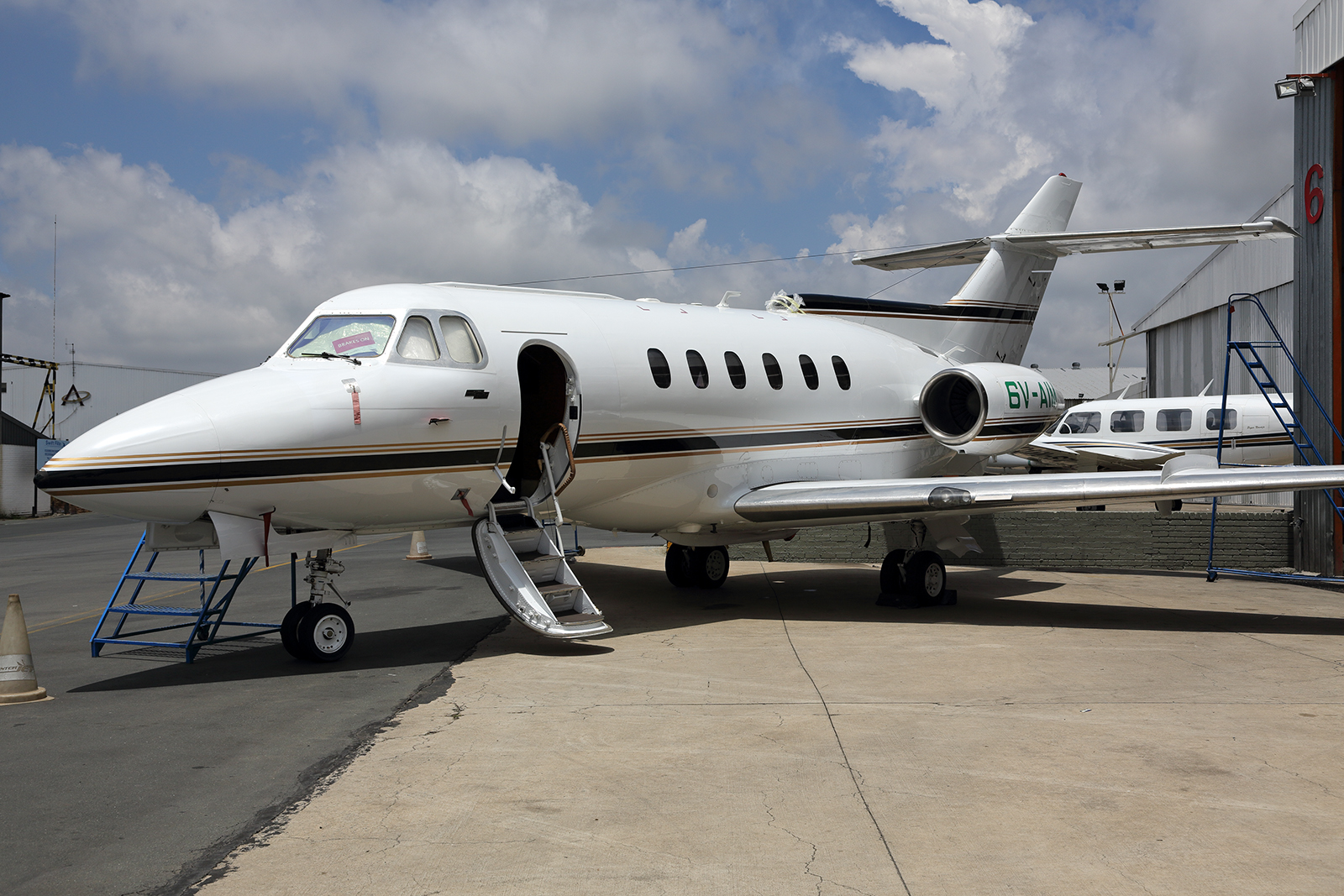
- 6V-AIM, the Hawker Siddeley HS-125-700A involved in the collision, pictured in 2014
- Type: Hawker Siddeley HS-125-700A
- Operator: Senegalair
- Call sign: 6 VICTOR ALPHA INDIA MIKE
- Registration: 6V-AIM
- Flight origin: Ouagadougou Airport, Ouagadougou, Burkina Faso
- Destination: Léopold Sédar Senghor International Airport, Dakar, Senegal
- Occupants: 7
- Passengers: 4
- Crew: 3
- Missing: 7
- Survivors: 0

On 5 September 2015, CEIBA Intercontinental Flight 071, a Boeing 737-800 passenger jet en route from Dakar, Senegal, to Malabo, Equatorial Guinea, collided mid-air with a Hawker Siddeley HS-125 air ambulance jet operated by Senegalair. The 737 was slightly damaged and managed to land safely at Malabo, but the HS-125, after remaining airborne for almost an hour with the crew unresponsive, eventually crashed into the ocean, killing all seven people on board.

== Accident ==
The two aircraft collided at 18:13 approximately 130 km (80 mi) east of Tambacounda, Senegal, while cruising at an altitude of 35,000 feet (11,000 m) along the same airway in opposite directions, in an area with no radar coverage. The impact sheared off the top 1-metre (3.3 ft) section of the Boeing's right winglet and was registered on the on-board flight data recorder as a brief oscillation and an uncommanded yaw promptly corrected by the autopilot.

It is believed that air ambulance 6V-AIM was struck on the fuselage, resulting in the loss of cabin pressure and the incapacitation of the crew. The HS-125 continued flying for a further 55 minutes without the crew responding to any of the several attempts made to contact them. It flew past Dakar, its intended destination, before presumably running out of fuel and crashing into the Atlantic Ocean around 110 km (70 mi) west of Dakar. The wreckage was not recovered.

The crew of the CEIBA 737 in the meantime had assessed that their aircraft was operating normally, and decided to skip the scheduled stopover at Cotonou, Benin, and instead continue directly to Malabo (the airline's operating base), where it landed without further incident.

== Aircraft ==
The CEIBA aircraft was a Boeing 737-8FB with Equatorial Guinean registration 3C-LLY, named Bioko, which had been in service since February 2014. The air ambulance was a Hawker Siddeley HS-125-700A, Senegalese registration 6V-AIM, that had been in service since 1979.

== Passengers ==
Of the deceased victims, three were Senegalese, two were Algerian, and one each were from the Democratic Republic of Congo and France.

== Investigation ==
In August 2017, the Senegalese Bureau of Enquiry and Analysis for Civil Aviation Safety (BEA Sénégal) released a final report stating that the probable cause of the accident was the failure of the HS-125 crew to maintain the assigned flight level, which the crew had correctly acknowledged and read back to the air traffic control.

The report also noted that there had been previous incidents involving 6V-AIM in which a significant discrepancy was registered between the altitude indicated by the plane's altimeters and transponder, suggesting a possible fault in the aircraft's pitot-static system that may also have contributed to the accident. The report also lists as a possible contributing factor a failure by Senegalair's crew and maintenance staff to comply with established procedures, mentioning several previous detected instances.

Both aircraft were equipped with TCAS collision avoidance system, and the CEIBA 737's unit was subsequently analysed and found to be working correctly. Despite this, the CEIBA crew received no TCAS warnings prior to the collision, a circumstance that according to the report could have been the result of the HS-125's instrument failure and resulting discrepancy between the altitude information shown on the altimeter and the one fed to the transponder and TCAS systems.

== Aftermath ==
The 737-800 was repaired and returned to service with CEIBA Intercontinental. In January 2019, the aircraft was re-registered to Ethiopian registration as ET-AWR.

== See also ==
- Gol Transportes Aéreos Flight 1907 – a similar mid-air collision occurred in Brazil in 2006 also involving a Boeing 737-800
- List of civilian mid-air collisions
