= Energy in Equatorial Guinea =

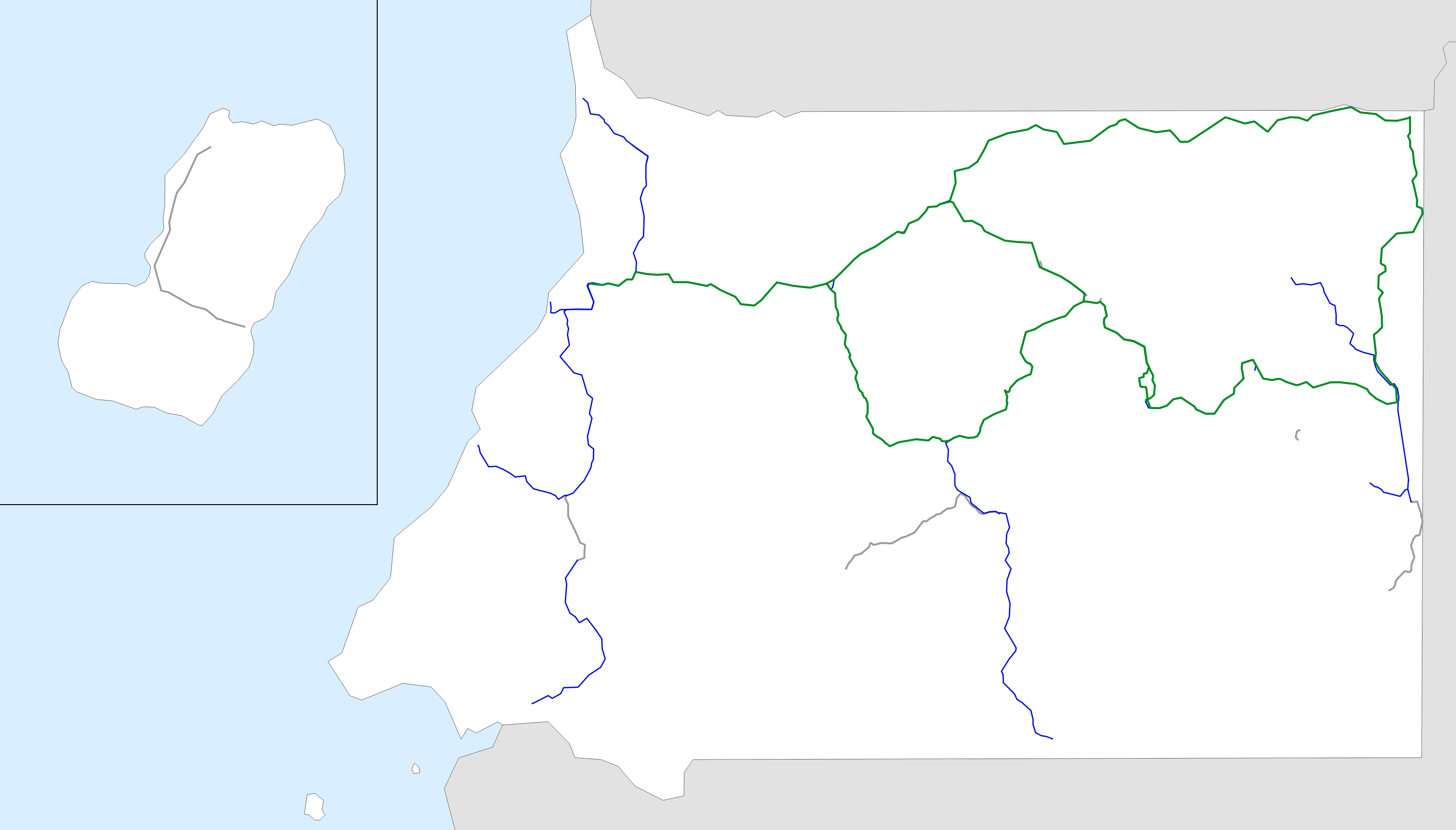
Electrical power grid with 220 kV (green) and 110 kV (blue) lines in 2022

Energy in Equatorial Guinea is an industry with plenty of potential, especially in the fields of oil and natural gas. However, production has been declining in recent years due to under-investment and a lack of new discoveries. In 2022, the country produced less than 100,000 barrels of oil per day (bopd) according to OPEC data.

Electricity consumption in Equatorial Guinea in 2015 was 36 kilotonnes of oil equivalent (ktoe). The country produces all of the energy it consumes.

As of 2012, renewable energy accounted for 29.2% of the final energy mix. Most of its renewable energy comes from hydropower plants.

In October 2012 the Djibloho Dam was inaugurated, which added 120 MW to the national generating capacity.

The total installed generating capacity in 2014 was an estimated 200 MW; electricity production in 2014 was estimated at 98 Mio. kWh. Electricity is provided by the national electricity company SEGESA.

The national oil company is GEPetrol.

Natural gas is exported as liquefied natural gas (LNG) produced by EG LNG but also transformed into cooking gas, or LPG, and methanol by Marathon Oil Corporation. The national gas company is Sonagas.
