= Ministry of Infrastructure and Land and Air Transport =

Ministry of Infrastructure and Land and Air Transport (French: Ministère des Infrastructures, des Transports Terrestres et Aériens, MITTA), previously known as the Ministry of Infrastructure, Land Transport and Opening Up (French: Ministère des Infrastructures, des Transports terrestres et du Désenclavement), is a ministry of the government of Senegal. Its head office is in Diamniadio, Dakar.

By April 2024 there was a new ministry of land and air transport.

== Agencies ==
One of agencies that is attached to the ministry for air transport is the Bureau d'Enquête et d'Analyse pour la sécurité de l'aviation civile (Bureau of Enquiry and Analysis for Civil Aviation Safety, BEA) which investigates accidents and incidents involving aircraft. As of 2015, the director of the Senegal BEA is Amadou Lamine Traoré. One of BEA's investigations was the mid-air collision of 2015.

== See also ==
- Ministry of Tourism (Senegal), previously the Ministry of Tourism and Air Transport
