= Afro-American University of Central Africa =

Public university in Equatorial Guinea

- Universidad Afro-Americana de África Central
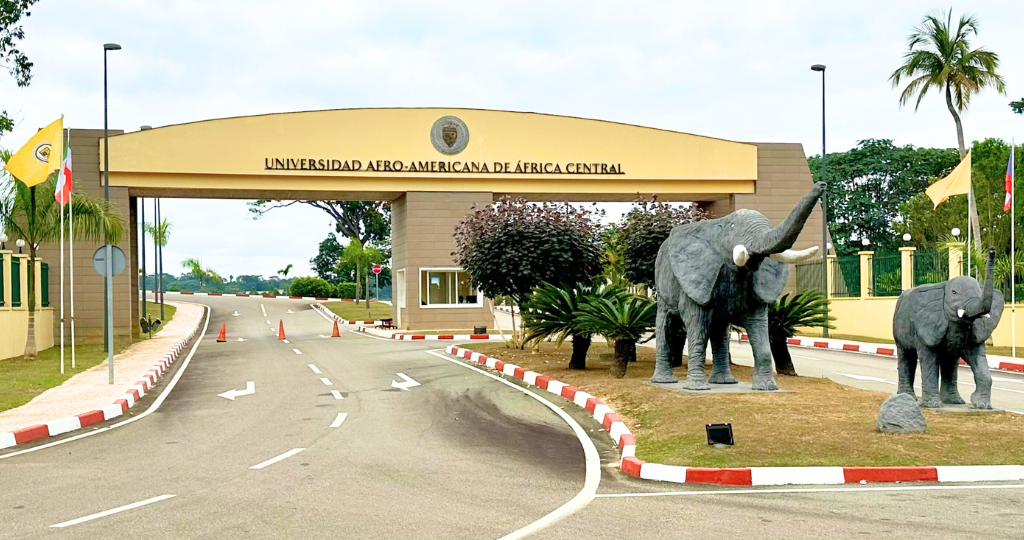
- Road entrance to the main campus
- Type: National
- Established: 2 December 2015; 10 years ago
- Location: Ciudad de la Paz, Djibloho province, Equatorial Guinea; 1°36′18″N 10°51′25″E
- Website: aaucauniversity.com

The Afro-American University of Central Africa (Spanish: Universidad Afro-Americana de África Central) is an Equatorial Guinea public institution of higher education, the second university to be created in the Republic of Equatorial Guinea in Central Africa.

It has a main campus at Ciudad de la Paz, Djibloho province.

== History ==
The university was created on 2 December 2015. Its main campus was inaugurated on 2 August 2019. On 27 January 2020, it opened for national and international students.
