= Ministry of Tourism (Senegal) =

Ministry of Tourism (French: Ministère du Tourisme du Sénégal), formerly known as the Ministry of Tourism and Air Transport (French: Ministère du Tourisme et des Transports Aériens de la République du Sénégal), is a government ministry of Senegal. Its head office is on the 8th floor of the Immeuble Y2 Cité Keur Goorgui in Dakar.

As of 2019, the minister is Mame Mbaye NIANG.

== Agencies ==
One of agencies that is attached to the ministry for air transport is the Bureau d'Enquête et d'Analyse pour la sécurité de l'aviation civile (Bureau of Enquiry and Analysis for Civil Aviation Safety, BEA) which investigates accidents and incidents involving aircraft. The agency was attached to the tourism ministry when it was the Ministry of Tourism and Air Transport. As of 2024 BEA Senegal is now with the Ministry of Infrastructure and Land and Air Transport (MITTA).
