= Julia Carvalho =

Portuguese engineer, businesswoman & corporate executive

- Citizenship: Portugal
- Education: University of Lisbon (BSc, MSc, PhD)
- Occupation: Mining engineer
- Years active: Since 2000
- Title: Corporate Manager at IBM, Responsible for Growth Markets in Africa

Julia Carvalho is a mining engineer, businesswoman and corporate executive from Portugal. She is the Corporate Manager of Growth Markets in Africa at International Business Machines (IBM), effective December 2021. She is based in Luanda, Angola

== Early life and education ==
Carvalho holds a bachelor's degree from the University of Lisbon, in Portugal. Her degree of Master of Science in Mining Engineering and her degree of Doctor of Philosophy in Engineering, were both obtained from the University of Lisbon as well. Over the years, she has attended energy, leadership and financial management training programs from MIT Sloan School of Management, Texas A&M University and Católica Lisbon School of Business & Economics.

== Career ==
Before her current assignment, Carvalho was the General Manager at IBM for Angola, Mozambique, Cape Verde and Sao Tome. In that capacity, she led IBM focus on the expansion of Hybrid Cloud and Artificial Intelligence in these markets.

Prior to her joining IBM, she worked at Halliburton, the American multinational corporation, as the head of sales in their Landmark Software & Services Unit. Before that, she was Professor of Engineering at the University of Lisbon.

She previously worked as a consultant at Sonangol and Sonagas. She also served as head of the Natural Resources Business Unit at Sinfic in Angola.

== See also ==
- Eva Ngigi–Sarwari
- Philippa Ngaju Makobore
