= Segesa =

Electricity network operator in Equatorial Guinea

SEGESA
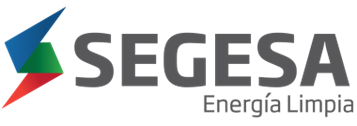
- Native name: Sociedad de Electricidad de Guinea Ecuatorial
- Type: Public
- Industry: Electricity
- Predecessor: SONER; ENERGE
- Founded: 2001
- Headquarters: Malabo, Equatorial Guinea
- Area served: Equatorial Guinea
- Key people: H.E. Eugenio Edu Ndong (Minister of Industry and Energy and Chairman of the Board)
- Products: Electric power
- Production output: 390.47 MW
- Services: Electric power transmission
- Owner: Government of Equatorial Guinea
- Number of employees: 1,598
- Parent: SEGESA Holding
- Divisions: SEGESA Comercial; SEGESA Generación; SEGESA Transmisión
- Website: http://www.segesa.gq/

SEGESA (stands for Sociedad de Electricidad de Guinea Ecuatorial) is the national electricity company of Equatorial Guinea, with its head offices in Malabo, Equatorial Guinea. It is the sole operator of the electricity sector of Equatorial Guinea. The company was created in November 2001 by a merger of the national rural electrification company SONER and the national electricity corporation ENERGE. In 2013 the company was reorganized into three units: SEGESA Comercial for distribution and sales, SEGESA Generación for generation activities and SEGESA Transmisión for transmission. The three units are overseen by SEGESA Holding.

Equatorial Guinea has two main electricity systems, for Bioko Island, and for the continental Rio Muni region. SEGESA has 730 employees across the three business units in Malabo for the Bioko system, and 823 employees in Bata and the continental region.

The primary lawmaking body for national electricity policy in Equatorial Guinea is the Ministry of Industry and Energy. The Ministry is responsible for regulation and compliance in the sector. Specific laws that deal with power sector management, tariffs and operations were passed in 2002 and 2005. Private companies wishing to invest in the sector must obtain licenses from the Ministry and can enter partnerships with SEGESA.

== Institutional Framework ==
The institutional framework for the power sector in Equatorial Guinea has a vertical structure. The Ministry of Industry and Energy defines the strategy for the power company (guided by the government's Horizon 2020 diversification plan). The ministry administers and assigns financing for projects and hands them over to SEGESA for implementation through its three business units.

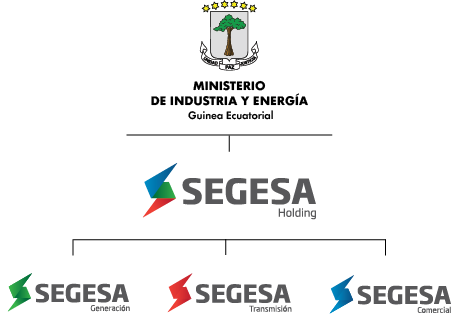

== Organization chart of the Power Sector ==
Over the last decade, SEGESA and the government have implemented a range of generation, transmission and distribution projects to ensure that the country no longer suffers power outages. The power grid in Equatorial Guinea is divided in two parts: the island grid (Malabo, Bioko Island) and the continental grid (Bata, Rio Muni). The high voltage power grid in the Rio Muni region has allowed the government to invest in interconnection points with Gabon and Cameroon.

== Supply and demand in Equatorial Guinea ==
=== Bioko Island ===
The Bioko grid is powered by the Malabo Turbogas gas-fired power plant at Punta Europa (near Malabo) with 154.2 MW capacity. It has eight turbines: 3 x 42 MW, 2 x 10 MW, 2 x 5.2 MW and a 4 MW turbine. These supply the city of Malabo and Bioko Island via 33 kW and 66 kW transmission lines.

In addition to the Punta Europa gas complex, the island has the SEMU power station that has 7.2 MW capacity (4 x 1.8 MW), the hydroelectric station at Riaba at 3 MW (2 x 1.5 MW) and the hydroelectric station at Musola. The latter two are out of service.

The demand for energy on Bioko Island in 2016 was about 79 MW (7% more than the previous year's demand). The current oversupply of electricity on the island facilitates development.

=== Rio Muni ===
The continental Rio Muni area of the country has a high-voltage grid of 220 kW, one of 110 kW and one of 20 kW, all of which are connected to the Djibloho Dam.

The power plants that supply the continental region are: Djibloho hydroelectric dam at 120 MW (4 x 30 MW), the Bata diesel/fuel oil fired power plant at 24 MW (3 x 8 MW), the 'Socorro' battery storage power plant (2 x 16.4 MW), a Cummins Group thermal plant (2 x 1 MW) and the Bikomo hydro plant, which is in the process of being restored (8 x 800 kVa)

Power demand in the continental area is around 65 MW and power capacity is equal to that of the insular region, meaning that it exceeds demand. In the dry season electricity production at the Djibloho plant is reduced and SEGESA is forced to cut supply. For this reason, a dam is needed to improve water flow to the Djibloho dam and increase the power of the plant. New power plant projects are underway to increase electricity availability and Equatorial Guinea has built the interconnection points that would allow it to export power to Gabon and Cameroon from Ebibeyín (220 kW) and Mongomo, which is 50 km from the Gabonese city of Oyem.

== Ongoing and future projects ==
Equatorial Guinea continues to invest heavily in the production and distribution of energy. The following power projects are scheduled: Construction of the Sendje 200 MW hydro plant (4 x 50 MW) – 2017, Construction of the Djibloho dam with two turbines of 42.5 MW - 2016, rehabilitation of Riaba Musola 1 and 2 and Bikomo hydro plants, Bata thermal plant conversion from diesel to gas, a natural gas storage area and Annobon solar micro-grid.

== See also ==
- Energy in Equatorial Guinea
