= President Obiang Nguema International Airport =

Airport in Equatorial Guinea

- IATA: GEM; ICAO: FGMY

Summary
- Airport type: Public
- Operator: Aeropuertos De Guinea Ecuatorial (ADGE)
- Serves: Mongomo, Equatorial Guinea
- Location: Mengomeyén
- Elevation AMSL: 2,142 ft (653 m)
- Coordinates: 01°41′24″N 11°01′26″E

Map
- Location of airport in Equatorial Guinea

Runways
Direction	Length		Surface
Direction	m	ft	Surface
18/36	3,000	9,843	Asphalt

Statistics (2020)
- Passengers: 8,499
- Flights: 688
- Sources: GCM SkyVector Bing Maps INEGE

President Obiang Nguema International Airport (IATA: GEM, ICAO: FGMY), is an airport located 1.0 kilometre (0.6 mi) southwest of the town of Mengomeyén, (also spelled Mongomeyen) in the mainland province of Wele-Nzas, Equatorial Guinea. The airport is named after Teodoro Obiang Nguema Mbasogo, who has been president of Equatorial Guinea since 1979.

The airport is the latest airport to be built in Equatorial Guinea and is the fifth international airport serving Equatorial Guinea, and is designed to connect the nation's geographically isolated areas, such as Annobón and Corisco, to the main population centers. The airport serves the nearby cities of Ciudad de la Paz, Equatorial Guinea's capital (since 2 January 2026), and Mongomo, the hometown of the President.

== Construction ==
According to the Centre for Aviation "The USD375 million project was funded entirely by the government."

== Inauguration ==
The airport was inaugurated on Equatorial Guinea's Independence Day, 12 October 2012. The inauguration was presided over by President Obiang Nguema Mbasogo and his wife Constancia Mangue, with the attendance of the President of the Republic of São Tomé and Príncipe, Manuel Pinto da Costa, guest of honour of the celebrations of independence. During the inauguration the Minister of Civil Aviation Fausto Abeso Fuma claimed the new airport is the best equipped, not only of Equatorial Guinea, but of Central Africa.

== Airlines and destinations ==
Airlines	Destinations
CEIBA Intercontinental	Malabo

== Facilities ==
The airport resides at an elevation of 2,165 feet (660 m) with its longest runway 3,000 metres (9,800 ft) long, which does not include a 270 metres (890 ft) displaced threshold on Runway 36. The runway can handle aircraft in the Boeing 747-400 class.

The airport has three turning loops, a parking esplanade of over 100,000 square metres (25 acres; 1,100,000 ft^{2}), an access road, drinking water supply, fire safety, new-generation navigation equipment, etc.

The Mongomeyen VOR-DME (Ident: MGY) is located just north of the field.

== See also ==
- Transport in Equatorial Guinea
- List of airports in Equatorial Guinea
