= Ciudad de la Paz =

Capital city of Equatorial Guinea

Ciudad de la Paz: Ville de la Paix (French); Cidade da Paz (Portuguese)
- Capital city
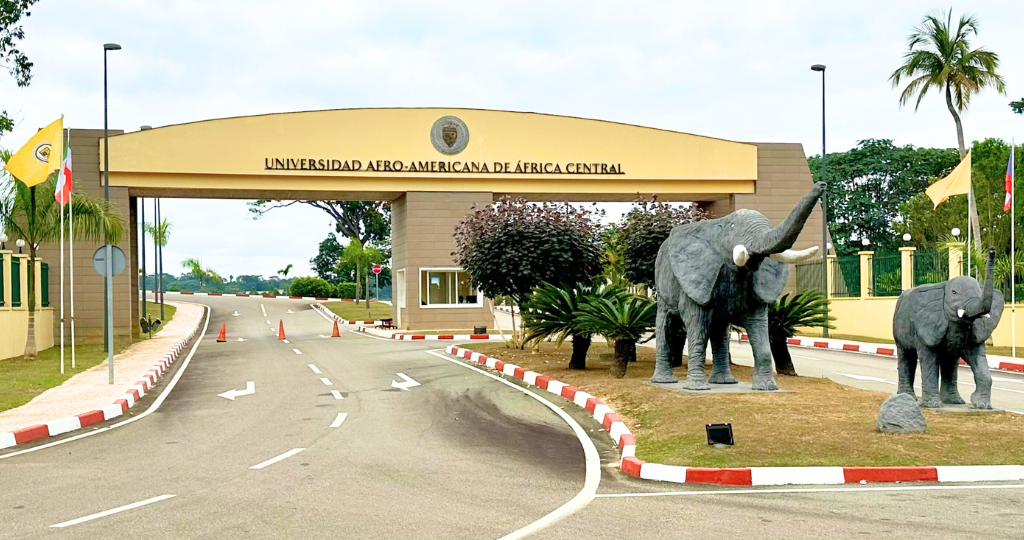
- Afro-American University of Central Africa

- Location within Equatorial Guinea Location within Africa
- Coordinates: 1°35′20″N 10°49′21″E
- Country: Equatorial Guinea
- Province: Djibloho
- Region: Río Muni
- Established: 2015

Government
  - Mayor: Florentino Ncogo Ndong

Area
  - Total: 81.5 km^{2} (31.5 sq mi)
- Elevation: 454 m (1,490 ft)

Population (2022)
  - Total: 2,000
  - Density: 25/km^{2} (64/sq mi)
- Time zone: UTC+01:00 (WAT)
- Climate: Am/As

Ciudad de la Paz (Spanish: [θjuˈðað ðe la ˈpaθ], lit. 'City of Peace'), previously known as Djibloho or Oyala, commonly known as La Paz, is the official capital city of Equatorial Guinea, though it is still being built. Established as an urban district in Wele-Nzas in 2015, it is also the administrative headquarters of Djibloho, Equatorial Guinea's province made in 2017, is the newest province, and is located near the town of Mengomeyén. In 2017, the city was officially named Ciudad de la Paz ("City of Peace").

The planned city's location was chosen for its easy access, milder climate, and inland location, as the 2004 Equatorial Guinea coup attempt raised fears about maritime access to the capital. It was designed by the Portuguese Studio for Architecture and Urbanism FAT – Future Architecture Thinking. It is projected to have around 200,000 inhabitants, a new Parliament building, a number of presidential villas and an area of 8150 hectares. The construction of this new capital has been criticized by the political opposition to President Teodoro Obiang, who was the driving force behind the initiative. The government of Equatorial Guinea began to move to the city in early 2017.

== Geography ==
=== Location ===
La Paz is located near the center of Río Muni, the continental part of Equatorial Guinea. It is located between the cities of Bata and Mongomo and 20 km from the airport of Mengomeyén. The power supply relies upon the 120 MW Djibloho Dam in the Djibloho Evinayong district.

=== Climate ===
Ciudad de la Paz has a tropical climate that borders between a tropical monsoon climate and a tropical savannah climate. Despite not being classified as having a tropical rainforest climate, it is nonetheless located within a region of tropical rainforest. It has high overall rainfall, averaging 2142 mm a year. There is an extensive wet season, spanning 10 months of the year from September to June, and a brief and slightly cooler dry season covering the remaining two months, July and August. There is also a noticeably drier, though still wet, stretch in December and January. Temperatures remain very warm throughout the course of the year, albeit lower than one might expect in other places with the same climate, especially considering its proximity to the equator.

Climate data for Ciudad de la Paz
Month	Jan	Feb	Mar	Apr	May	Jun	Jul	Aug	Sep	Oct	Nov	Dec	Year
Mean daily maximum °C (°F)	27.7 (81.9)	28.2 (82.8)	28.4 (83.1)	28.2 (82.8)	27.8 (82.0)	26.4 (79.5)	25.2 (77.4)	25.6 (78.1)	26.3 (79.3)	26.9 (80.4)	26.9 (80.4)	27.1 (80.8)	27.1 (80.8)
Daily mean °C (°F)	23.1 (73.6)	23.2 (73.8)	23.2 (73.8)	23.3 (73.9)	23.1 (73.6)	22.2 (72.0)	21.1 (70.0)	21.2 (70.2)	21.9 (71.4)	22.3 (72.1)	22.4 (72.3)	22.9 (73.2)	22.5 (72.5)
Mean daily minimum °C (°F)	18.5 (65.3)	18.3 (64.9)	18.1 (64.6)	18.4 (65.1)	18.4 (65.1)	18.0 (64.4)	17.0 (62.6)	16.9 (62.4)	17.6 (63.7)	17.8 (64.0)	17.9 (64.2)	18.7 (65.7)	18.0 (64.4)
Average rainfall mm (inches)	89 (3.5)	181 (7.1)	228 (9.0)	270 (10.6)	240 (9.4)	125 (4.9)	14 (0.6)	37 (1.5)	233 (9.2)	352 (13.9)	254 (10.0)	119 (4.7)	2,142 (84.4)
Source: Climate-Data.org

== Planning and construction ==
In the middle of the undeveloped rain forest, the government planned to build a new city as the future seat of government. It would be the headquarters of the president, government, administration, police and military leadership and replace the then capital Malabo. The city was designed to house 160,000–200,000 people, living in an area of 81.5 km^{2}.

A golf course, a university, a luxury hotel, and a six-lane highway were finished in 2013. Other buildings planned include government buildings, a financial district and residential areas. Three bridges and highways have been completed or are under construction. A connection between the city and the new airport in Mengomeyen was constructed.

Funding for construction was provided through AICEP Portugal Global. The plans came from a Portuguese architectural office. The construction work was supported by China, Poland, Brazil and North Korea. Construction faced delays such as, according to unconfirmed reports, President Obiang ordering a building to be moved because he did not like the view. Additionally, while many specialized components were imported, the city’s foundational construction relied heavily on locally sourced materials. This was made possible by the establishment of domestic quarrying operations, which provided high-quality stone and aggregates essential for infrastructure and large-scale development within the Oyala region.

== Design ==
The city was designed by the Portuguese urban architecture firm FAT – Future Architecture Thinking. Estimates of its ultimate population size have been revised from 65,000 initially to between 160,000 and 200,000. The city was built on an area of 8,150 hectares (81.5 km^{2} or 20,100 acres).

== Progress ==
In 2021, a video sponsored by the China State Construction group, which is part of the building consortium, showed what appeared to be an overpass of completed, but not yet functioning, highways to Ciudad de la Paz, Bata, Mongomo and Mengomeyén airport. The video continued showing viewers around parts of the new city, where work on a six-story cylindrical tower-building for the ministry of infrastructure remained partly built, and most other structures appeared far less advanced.

However, 2022 videos show two glass towers, the gateway to the campus of the Afro-American University of Central Africa, several administrative style buildings and the Grand Hotel Djibloho all appearing functionally complete. The 380-room hotel has a golf course, wellness center and facilities for conferences as large as 1200 people, though its own website describes itself as being surrounded by tropical forest, which suggests that it is not in the heart of a city.

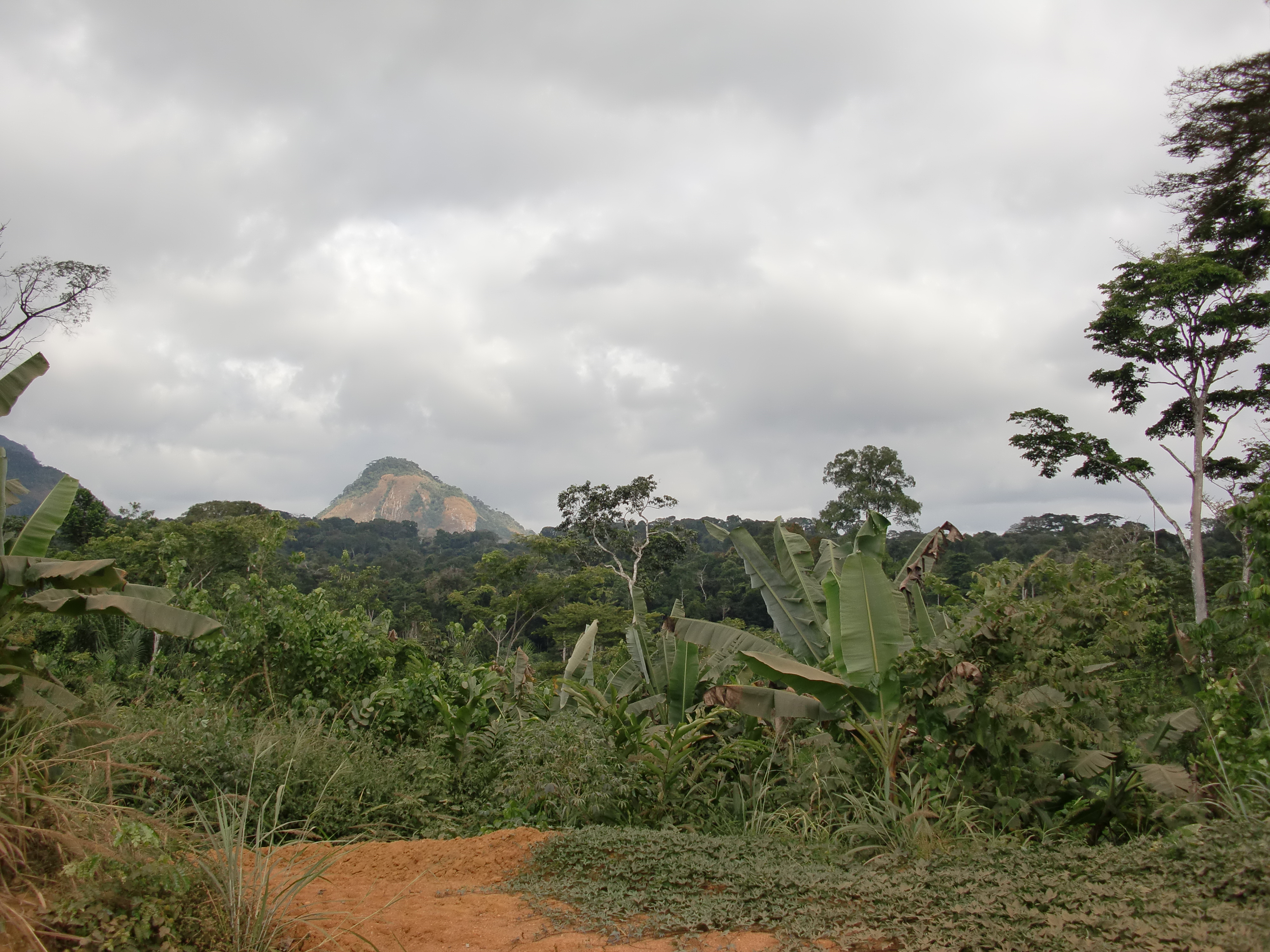
Forest

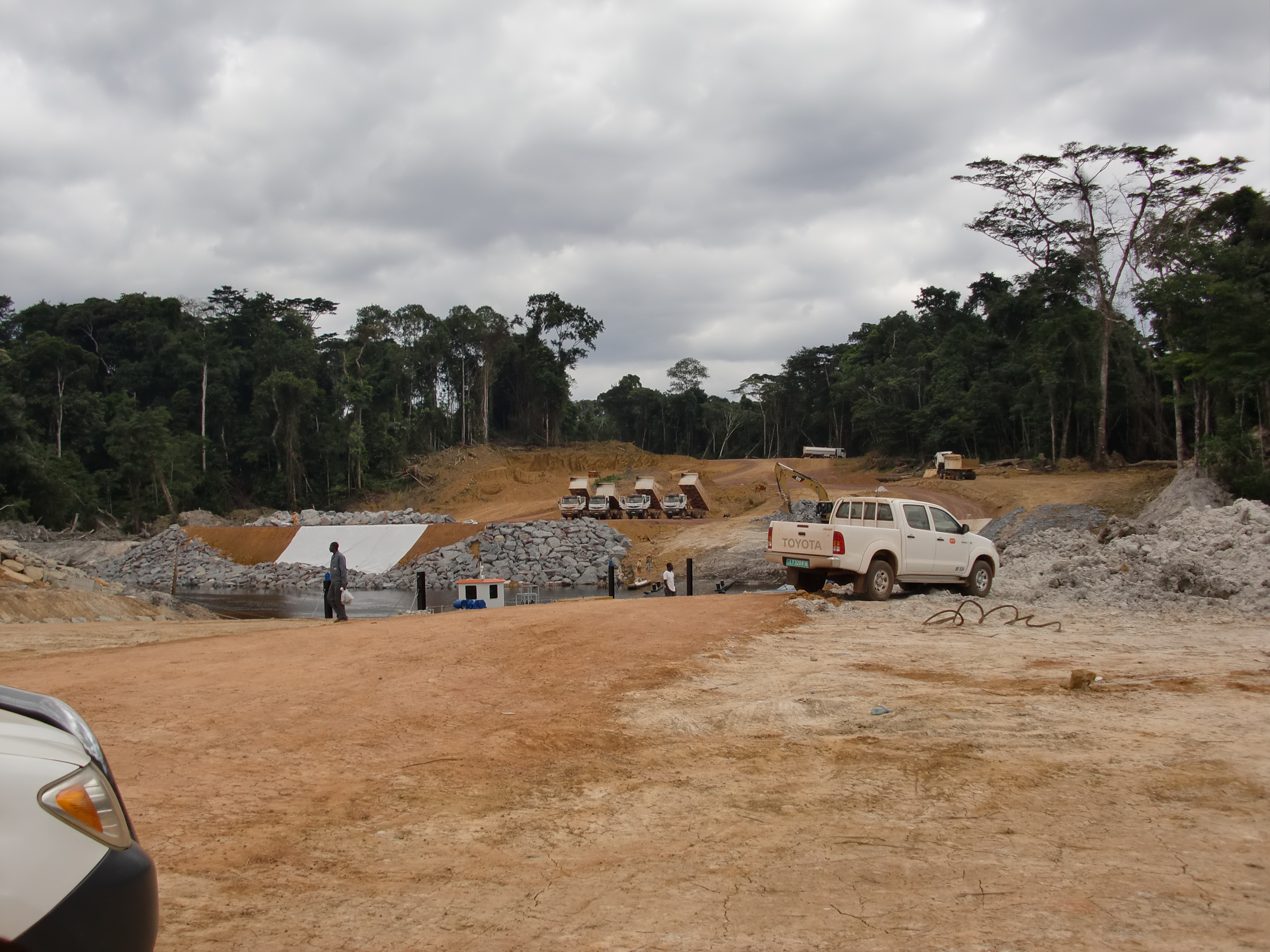
Bridge on the scheduled presidential residence (2010)

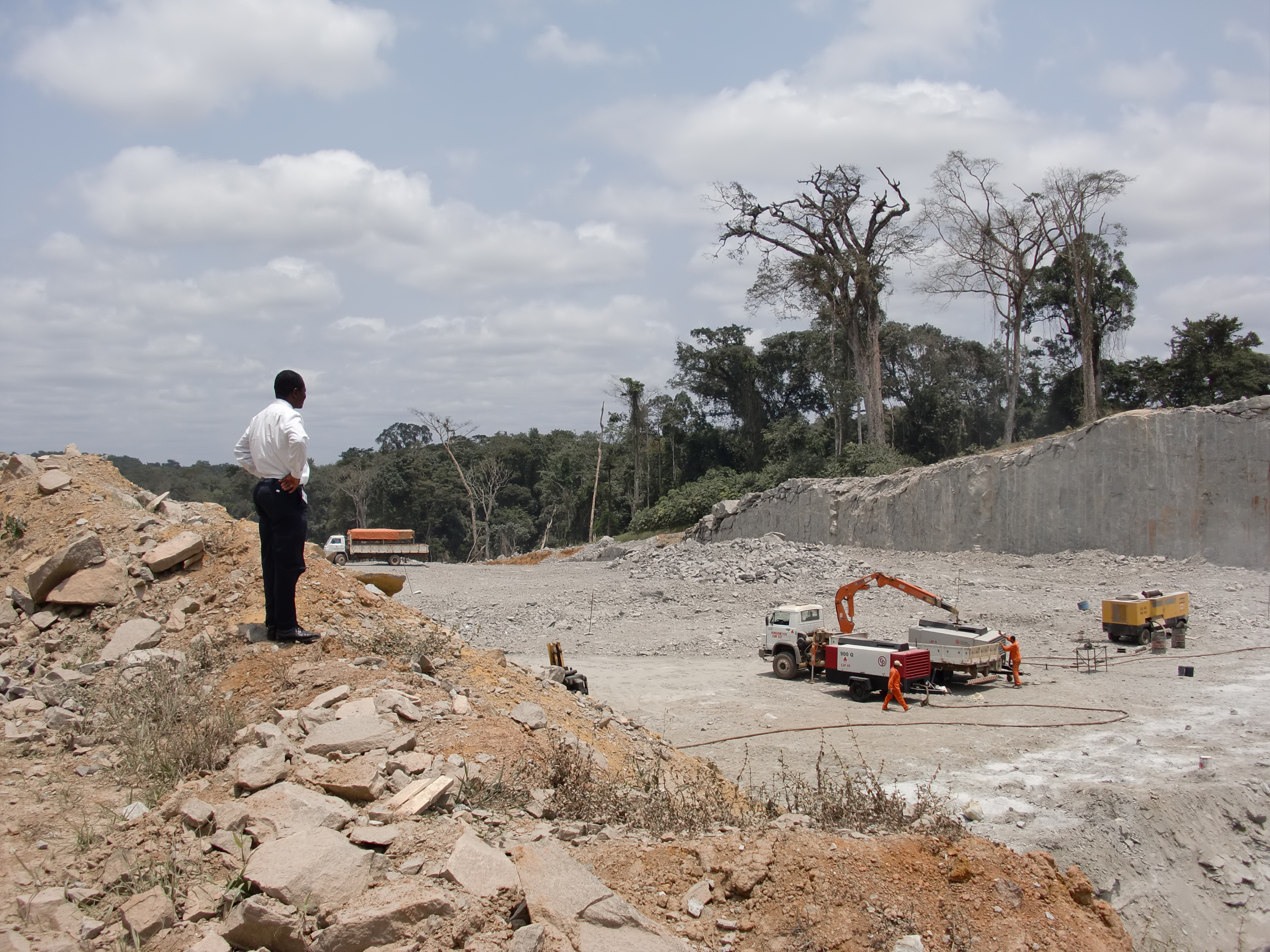
Highway under construction (2010)

On 2 January 2026, a presidential decree by Obiang officially planned on moving the nation's capital from Malabo to Ciudad de la Paz. The 2026 capital designation also established a transition period for the physical relocation of the national government. Under the decree, the presidency, state institutions, constitutional bodies, government agencies and public companies were given one year to take the measures necessary for their transfer and effective establishment in Ciudad de la Paz. The change therefore involved both a formal designation of the new capital and a phased transfer of government functions from Malabo.

== Participating companies ==
- Director of planning, roads, highways and urban network diagram: CSCEC, Vinci SA, Egis Route
- Perimeter Highway: ARG
- Bridges: Bouygues, Besix, Vinci SA, General Works
- Buildings: CSCEC, Piccini
- Universities: Unicon
- Regional parliament: Summa
- Presidential palace: Seguibat
- Ministry buildings: CSCEC

== See also ==
- List of purpose-built national capitals
