= Transport in Equatorial Guinea =

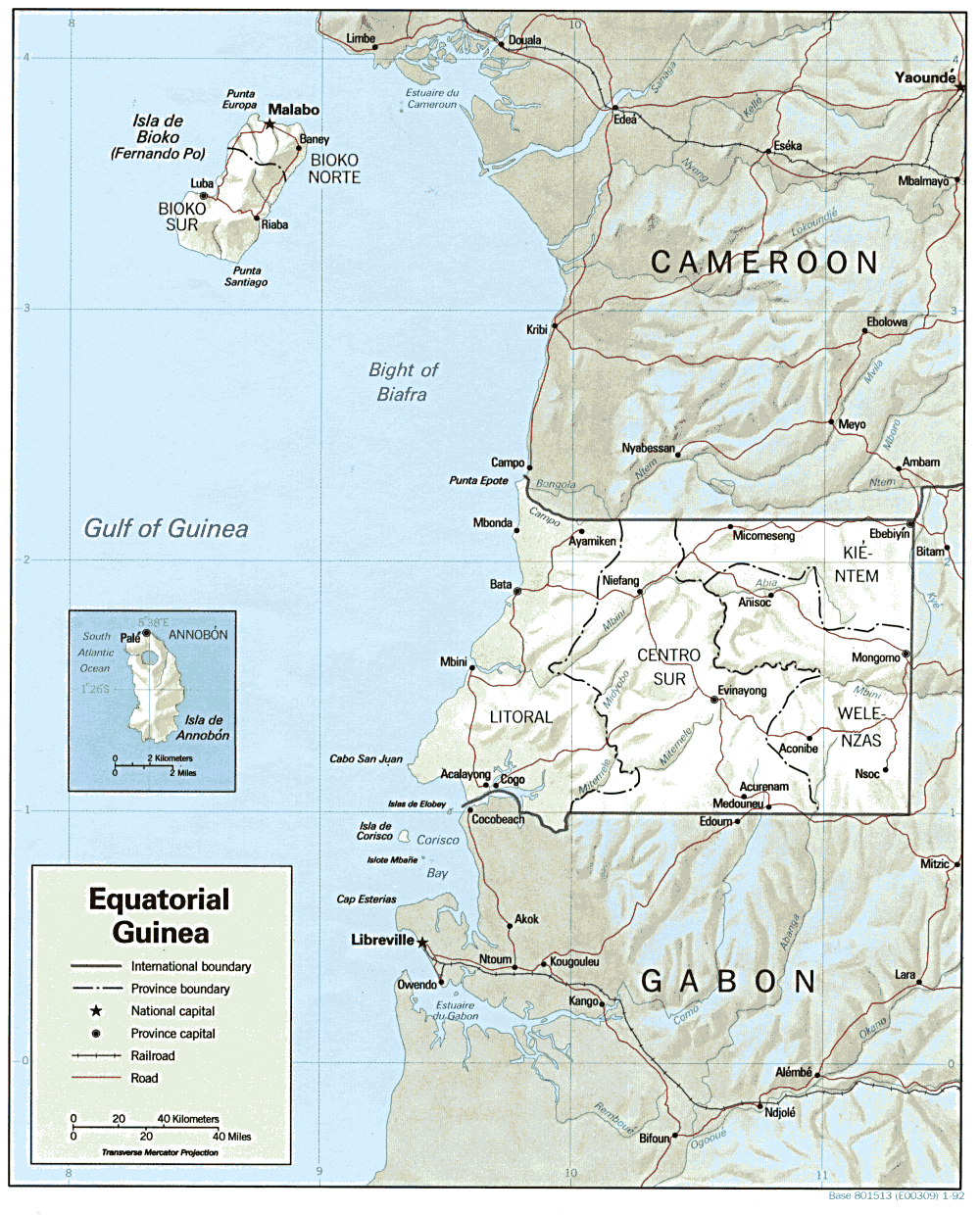
Map of Equatorial Guinea.

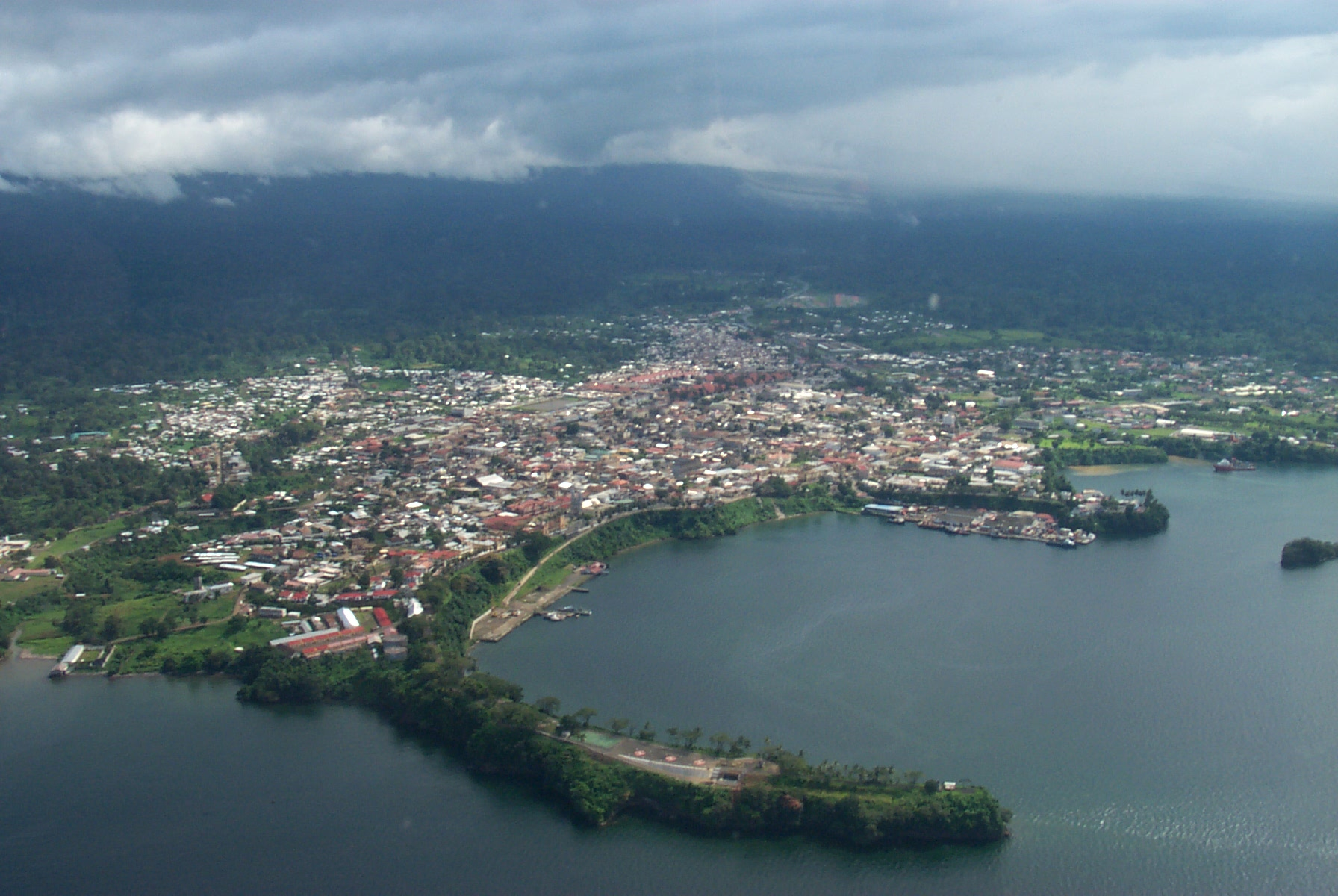
The port of Malabo.

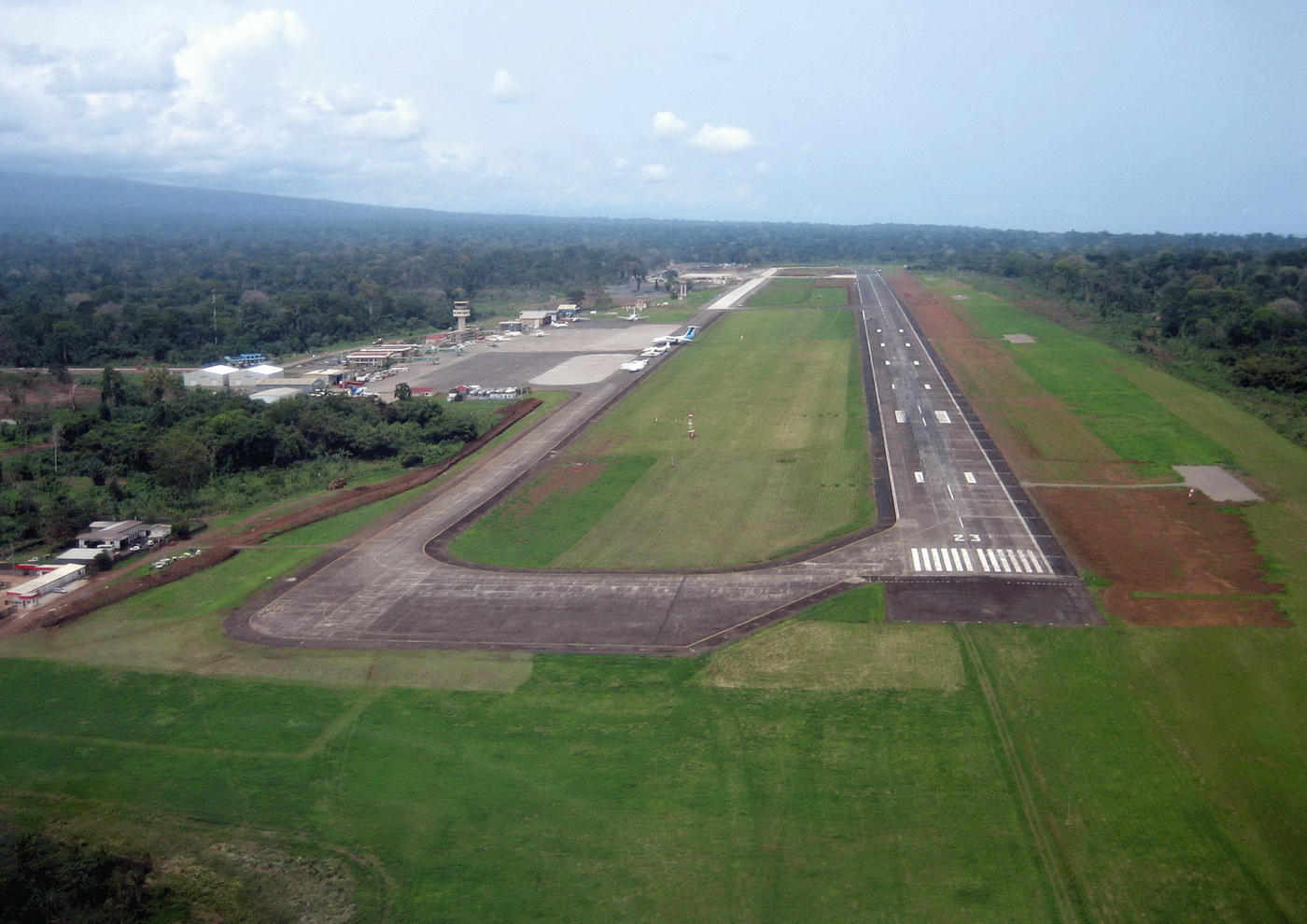
Malabo International Airport (Aeropuerto de Malabo in Spanish), en Punta Europa, island of Bioko.

This article lists transport in Equatorial Guinea.

== Railways ==
The history of rail transport in Equatorial Guinea began in 1913, when a standard-gauge railway was constructed from the capital of Equatorial Guinea, Santa Isabel, to the nearby villages of Banapa and Basupo. In 1929 this railway was extended to the shore near Basupo but the line was unprofitable and was then closed.

There are currently no railways in Equatorial Guinea.

== Highways ==
There are 2,880 km (1,790 mi) of highways in Equatorial Guinea, the majority of which were not paved in 2002. Equatorial Guinea's roads and highways are underdeveloped, but improving. During the rainy season, roads are frequently impassable without four-wheel drive vehicles.

Furthermore, the country has recently built a 175-km long two-lane expressway that runs between Bata and President Obiang Nguema International Airport, and it is expected to soon reach the city of Mongomo, located on the border with Gabon.

== Merchant marine ==
In 2005, the country had one merchant ship of over 1,000 GT in service; a cargo vessel of 6,556 GT.

== Airports ==
There are seven airports in Equatorial Guinea. Its main airport is Malabo International Airport in Punta Europa, Bioko Island. International flights operate from:

- Madrid (Spain): Ceiba Intercontinental (4 flights per week)
- Paris (France): Air France (3 flights per week)
- Frankfurt (Germany): Lufthansa (3 flights per week)
- Casablanca (Morocco): Royal Air Maroc ( 2 flights per week)
- Istanbul (Turkey): Turkish Airlines (1 flight per week)
- Cotonou (Benin): Cronos Airlines (2 flights per week)
- Abidjan (Ivory Coast): Ceiba Intercontinental (3 flights per week)
- Accra (Ghana): Ceiba Intercontinental (3 flights per week);
- São Tomé (São Tomé and Príncipe): Ceiba Intercontinental (3 flights per week);
- Douala (Cameroon) Ethiopian Airlines (3 flights per week); Cronos Airlines (3 flights per week)
- Libreville (Gabon): Royal Air Maroc (2 flights per week)
- Port Harcourt (Nigeria): Cronos Airlines (2 flights per week)
- Addis Abeba (Ethiopia): Ethiopian Airlines (3 flights per week)

From Malabo airport, you can fly to any of the other airports in the country. These airports are located in the region of Annobón, Bata, Mongomoyen, and Corisco.

== See also ==
- Economy of Equatorial Guinea
- List of airports in Equatorial Guinea
