= Eva Ngigi–Sarwari =

Kenyan businesswoman (1981–2026)

- Born: Eva Ngigi; 3 March 1981; Kenya
- Died: 20 October 2026 (aged 45); China
- Education: Moi University; University of Nairobi Emeritus Institute of Management
- Occupations: Businesswoman and Corporate Executive
- Years active: 1997–2026
- Known for: Leadership & business expertise
- Title: Senior Business Leader & Country Manager at Visa Inc. for Kenya, Somalia & South Sudan

Eva Ngigi–Sarwari (née Eva Ngigi; 3 March 1981 – October 2026) was a Kenyan businesswoman. She was an executive at Visa Inc., responsible for Kenya, Somalia and South Sudan, after joining in September 2020.

== Early life ==
Ngigi–Sarwari was born in Kenya in 1981. She graduated from Moi University in November 2004, with a Bachelor of Business Management degree, majoring in Marketing. She earned a Master of Business Administration. She was awarded by the University of Nairobi in 2010. In 2019, she successfully undertook the Oxford Fintech Programme at Saïd Business School. Later the same year, she enrolled in the Emeritus Institute of Management (EMERITUS), graduating in 2020 with a Postgraduate Diploma in Digital Business.

== Career ==
After her first degree, she went into banking. She spent five years at Cooperative Bank of Kenya, focusing on improving the bank's customer relationship and experience.

Ngigi-Sarwari then spent two years at CfC Stanbic Holdings (today Stanbic Holdings Plc), focusing on transaction products and services sales, as manager for that department. In 2012, Ngigi was hired by Standard Chartered Kenya and over seven years rose to the position of Head of Transaction Banking in the Commercial Banking Division. In January 2020, she took over as the Project Lead of SC Ventures, a new enterprise by Stanchart. She left Stanchart Kenya in September 2020.

In September 2020, she was appointed to her last position at Visa Inc. She oversaw operations in Kenya, Somalia and South Sudan. She steered the organization to greater heights in her tenure.

== Personal life and death ==
Ngigi-Sarwari was the mother to two sons and one daughter. She died in October 2026, at the age of 45, while on business trip to China.

== See also ==
- Julia Carvalho
