= Cronos Airlines =

Equatoguinean airline

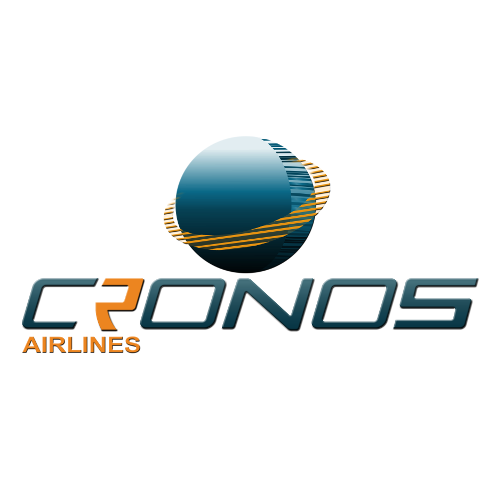

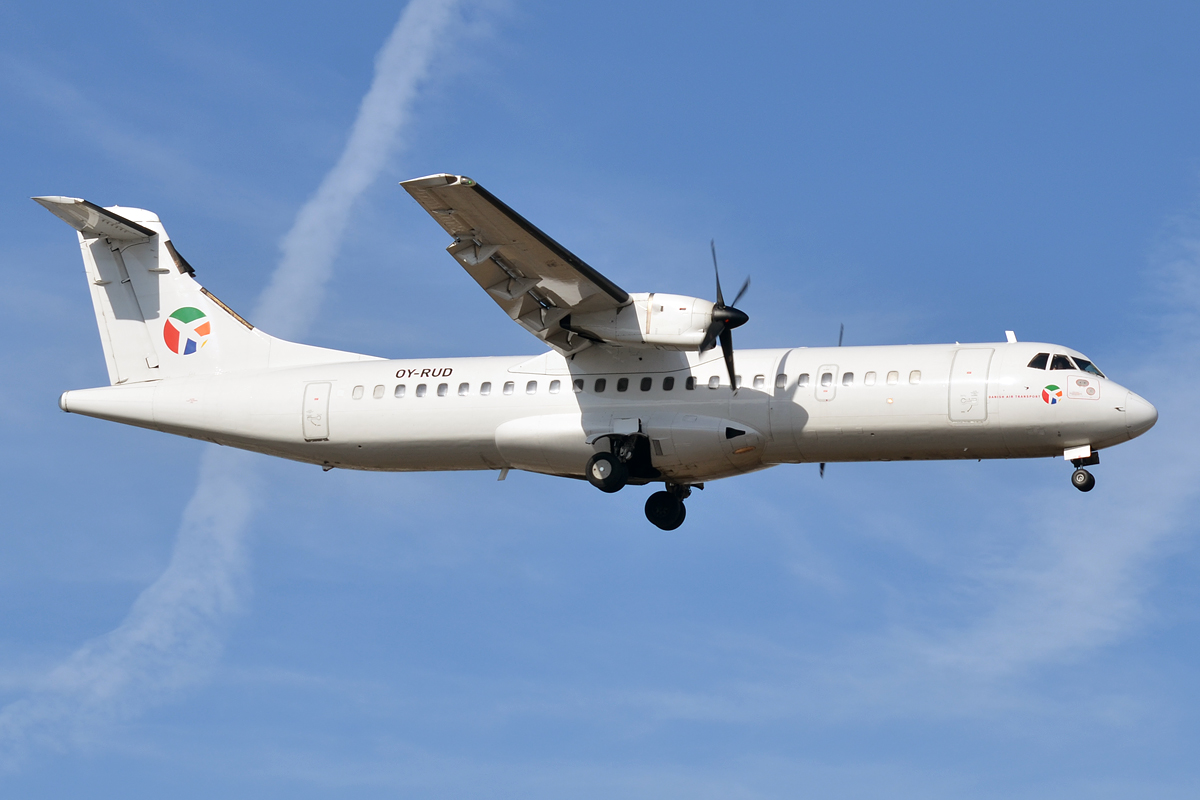
IATA	ICAO	Call sign
C8	CRA	CRONOS
- Founded: 2007
- Hubs: Malabo International Airport
- Fleet size: 2
- Destinations: 6
- Headquarters: Malabo, Equatorial Guinea
- Key people: Andreas Kaïafas, CEO
- Website: cronosair.com/en/

Cronos Airlines is a regional airline headquartered in Malabo, Equatorial Guinea. Cronos Airlines is a passenger and cargo carrier based at Malabo International Airport in Equatorial Guinea. It operates a service in Equatorial Guinea, Cameroon, Benin and Nigeria. It is banned from flying in the EU.

== History ==
Cronos Air was founded in 2007 by its CEO, Andreas Kaïafas. It started operations in 2008, Cronos was created in 2008, with a small 19-seater and a license to operate for six months. It was a provisional license. They came back with a 30-seater at the end of 2009 and by July 2010 they had a 92-seater, the BA-146, which was operating in Germany before with Eurowings. They later acquired a second 98-seater and a 'certificado de transporte aéreo' (air transport certificate).

== Destinations ==
Cronos Airlines operates the following services (as of 19 February 2016):

- Benin
  - Cotonou - Cadjehoun Airport
- Cameroon
  - Douala - Douala International Airport
- Equatorial Guinea
  - Bata - Bata Airport
  - Malabo - Malabo International Airport
  - Mengomeyén
- Nigeria
  - Port Harcourt - Port Harcourt International Airport
  - Lagos - Murtala Muhammed International Airport
- Ghana
  - Accra - Accra International Airport
- Niger
  - Niamey - Diori Hamani International Airport

== Fleet ==
=== Current fleet ===
As of July 2026, Cronos Airlines operates the following aircraft:

Cronos Airlines fleet
Aircraft	In Service	Orders	Passengers		Notes
Aircraft	In Service	Orders	Y	Total	Notes
Embraer ERJ 145MP	1	—			
Embraer 170	1	—			
Total	2	0			

=== Former fleet ===
As of August 2025, Cronos Airlines operated 1 Embraer ERJ 145 and 1 Embraer 170

Cronos Airlines has previously operated the following aircraft:

- 1 Avro RJ100
- 1 BAe 146-300A
- 1 Airbus A319-100
- 2 Embraer ERJ 135LR
