= EG LNG Pipeline Suspension Bridge =

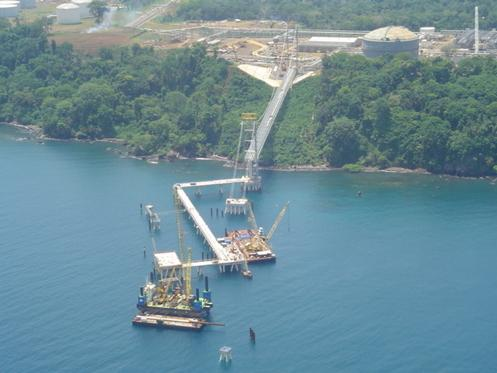
- Coordinates: 3.7815°N 8.6991°E
- Carries: LNG pipeline Walkway
- Crosses: geologically unstable slope
- Locale: Punta Europa, Bioko, Equatorial Guinea
- Owner: EG LNG

Characteristics
- Design: Suspension bridge
- Total length: 350 metres (1,150 ft)
- Width: 9.5 metres (31 ft)
- Piers in water: 1

History
- Designer: Buckland & Taylor
- Constructed by: Bechtel
- Construction end: 2006

The EG LNG Pipeline Suspension Bridge is a suspension bridge in Bioko, Equatorial Guinea. It is the first in the world to carry a Liquefied Natural Gas pipeline.
