= EG LNG =

Coordinates: 3.7837°N 8.716°E

CGI view of the plant

EG LNG (also known as Punta Europa LNG) is a liquefied natural gas (LNG) company that operates an LNG terminal and plant at Malabo, the capital city of Equatorial Guinea located on Bioko Island. The LNG plant began operation in 2007 and the first cargo of LNG was delivered on 24 May 2007.

== LNG plant ==
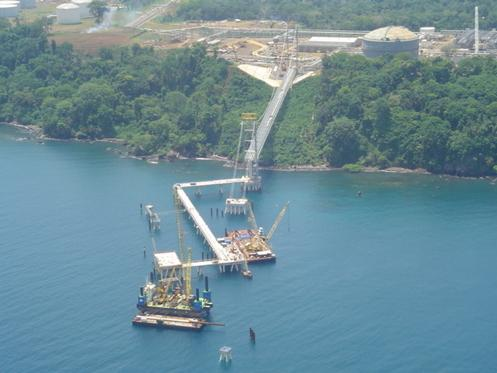
EG LNG Pipeline Suspension Bridge.

The plant's train (liquefaction and purification facility) 1 has a capacity of 3.4 million metric tonnes per annum. Several systems are in places such as feed gas metering, liquefaction, refrigeration, ethylene storage, boil off gas compression, product transfer to storage and LNG product metering. The EG LNG plant utilizes the ConocoPhillips Optimized Cascade (SM) Process.

A planned second train will produce 4.4 million metric tonnes of LNG per annum. In addition to the construction of the second train, the US$3 billion project includes construction of three gas pipelines to connect Nigeria, Cameroon and Equatorial Guinea gas fields with the LNG plant. In addition to the shareholders of the Train 1, Unión Fenosa Gas, a joint venture of Unión Fenosa, Eni, and E.ON will also participate in this project. As a result, Train 2's ownership structure will be Sonagas 40%, Marathon 35%, Mitsui 8.5%, Marubeni 6.5%, Galp Energia 5% and Gas Natural Fenosa 5%. Bechtel was awarded the FEED contract for the second train in August 2006.

== Shareholders ==
The shareholders in EG LNG Co are:

- Marathon Oil (60%);
- Sonagas, the National Gas Company of Equatorial Guinea (25%);
- Mitsui & Co., Ltd. (8.5%);
- Marubeni Corporation (6.5%).

== See also ==
- Energy in Equatorial Guinea
