= Sonagas =

Natural gas company in Equatorial Guinea

Logo

Sonagas (Sociedad Nacional de Gas de Guinea Ecuatorial) is the Equatorial Guinean national natural gas company. It was formed in 2005. It operates in conjunction with GEPetrol, the nation's principal petroleum company, and EG LNG, the nation's liquid natural gas company, to manage the nation's fossil fuel resources.

The officers of the company are Director General Juan Antonio Ndong Ondo and Assistant Director General Serapio Sima Ntutumu.

== Operations ==
- The Bioko Methanol Plant is operated by the Atlantic Methanol Production Company (AMPCO), a joint venture of Marathon Oil and the Samadan Oil subsidiary of Noble Energy. Sonagas itself also owns 10% of AMPCO. The plant produces 19,000 barrels (3,000 m^{3}) of methanol per day.
- The Punta Europa Liquified Petroleum Gas facility is also operated by Marathon, Samadan and Sonagas, and produces 20,000 barrels per day (3,200 m^{3}/d) of liquefied petroleum gas.
- The Equatorial Guinea Liquified Natural Gas Plant (EG LNG) began production in 2007.

== See also ==
- Energy in Equatorial Guinea
