= CEIBA Intercontinental =

State-owned airline of Equatorial Guinea

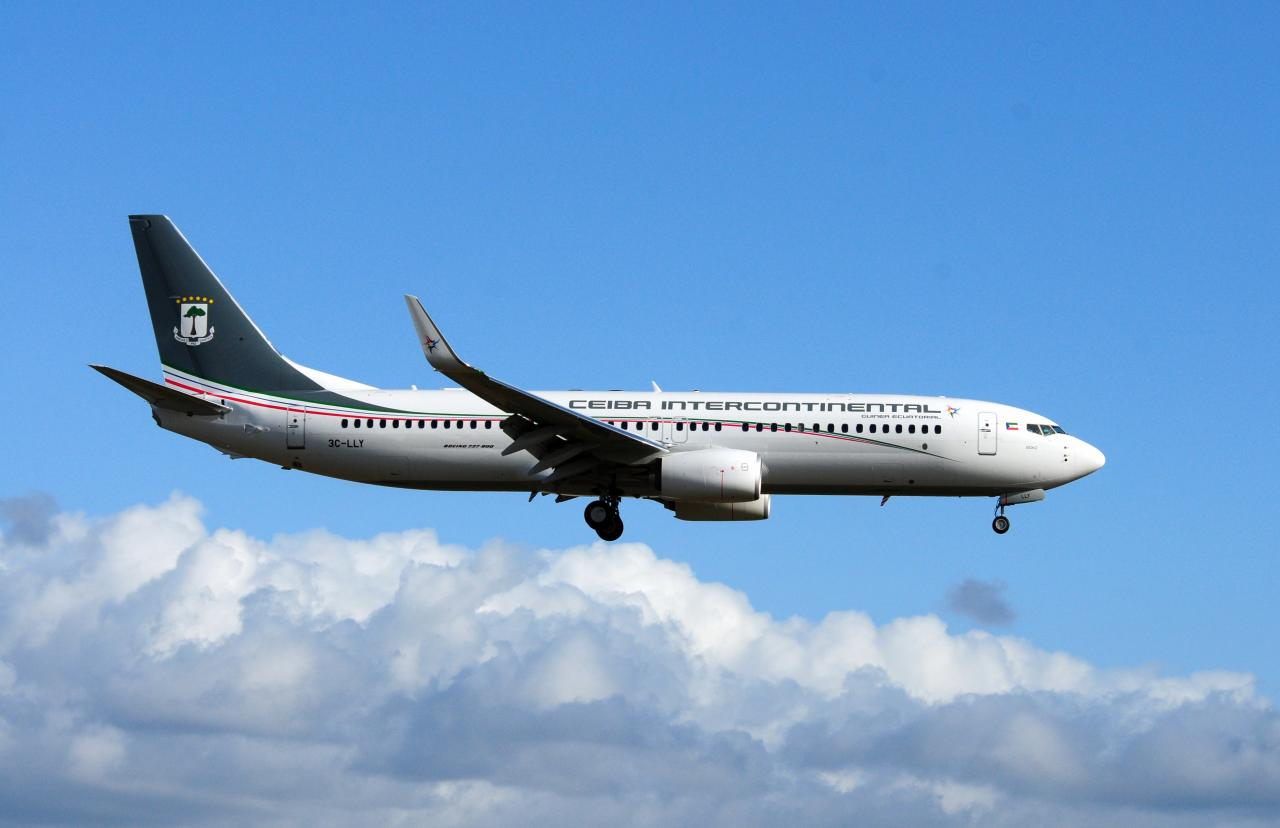
IATA	ICAO	Call sign
C2	CEL	CEIBA LINE
- Founded: May 2007
- Operating bases: Malabo International Airport
- Fleet size: 4
- Destinations: 15 (August 2017)
- Headquarters: Malabo, Equatorial Guinea
- Website: ceibaintercontinentalairlines.com

CEIBA Intercontinental is an airline headquartered in Malabo, Equatorial Guinea, and based at Malabo International Airport.

== History ==
In 2009, the Agence France Press (AFP) reported that the CEO of CEIBA Intercontinental Mamadou Jaye, a Senegalese citizen of Gambian origin, left Equatorial Guinea with a suitcase containing 3.5 billion CFA francs (approximately 5 million euros or 6.5 million United States dollars) and spare ATR aircraft parts to negotiate trade deals with Côte d'Ivoire, The Gambia, Ghana, and Senegal and to establish a West African office for CEIBA. The report said that Jaye never returned to Equatorial Guinea. Jaye denied that he took money from the company and filed a lawsuit against Rodrigo Angwe, the Malabo-based correspondent for Agence France Presse and Radio France Internationale (RFI) who submitted the story. Angwe used an employee as a source; the employee said that he received the information from the internet. After the employee's admission, AFP and RFI retracted the story. Jaye accused Angwe of publishing the internet article himself.

In 2022, it was announced that CEIBA would be privatised. In 2024, Equatorial Guinea was discussing a plan to sell a stake in the company to Ethiopian Airlines after an official expression of interest; CEIBA is one of five state businesses due to be sold off under a 2019 IMF deal.

=== Malabo to Madrid ===
In 2012, the airline made its first flight between Malabo and Madrid with its own planes. This came after the route had been operating throughout the 1990s, 2000s, and early 2010s, under Spanish airlines such as Spanair. In 2013, CEIBA had direct flights from Malabo to Madrid via a wet-lease agreement with White Airways.

As of 2024, all airlines in Equatorial Guinea are on the list of air carriers banned in the European Union, but CEIBA operates this route under a wet-lease agreement with Wamos Air.

== Destinations ==
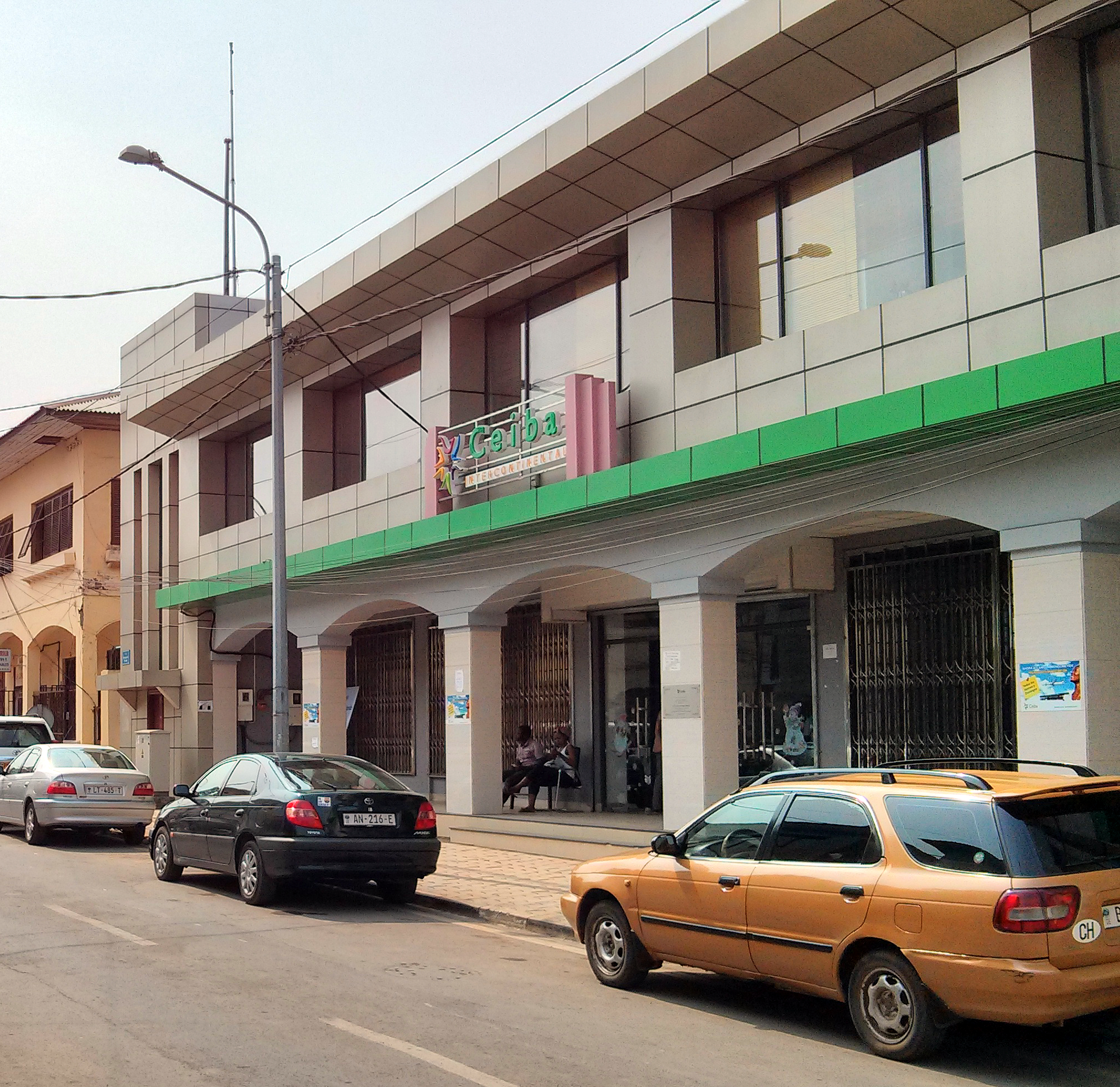
Headquarters in Malabo

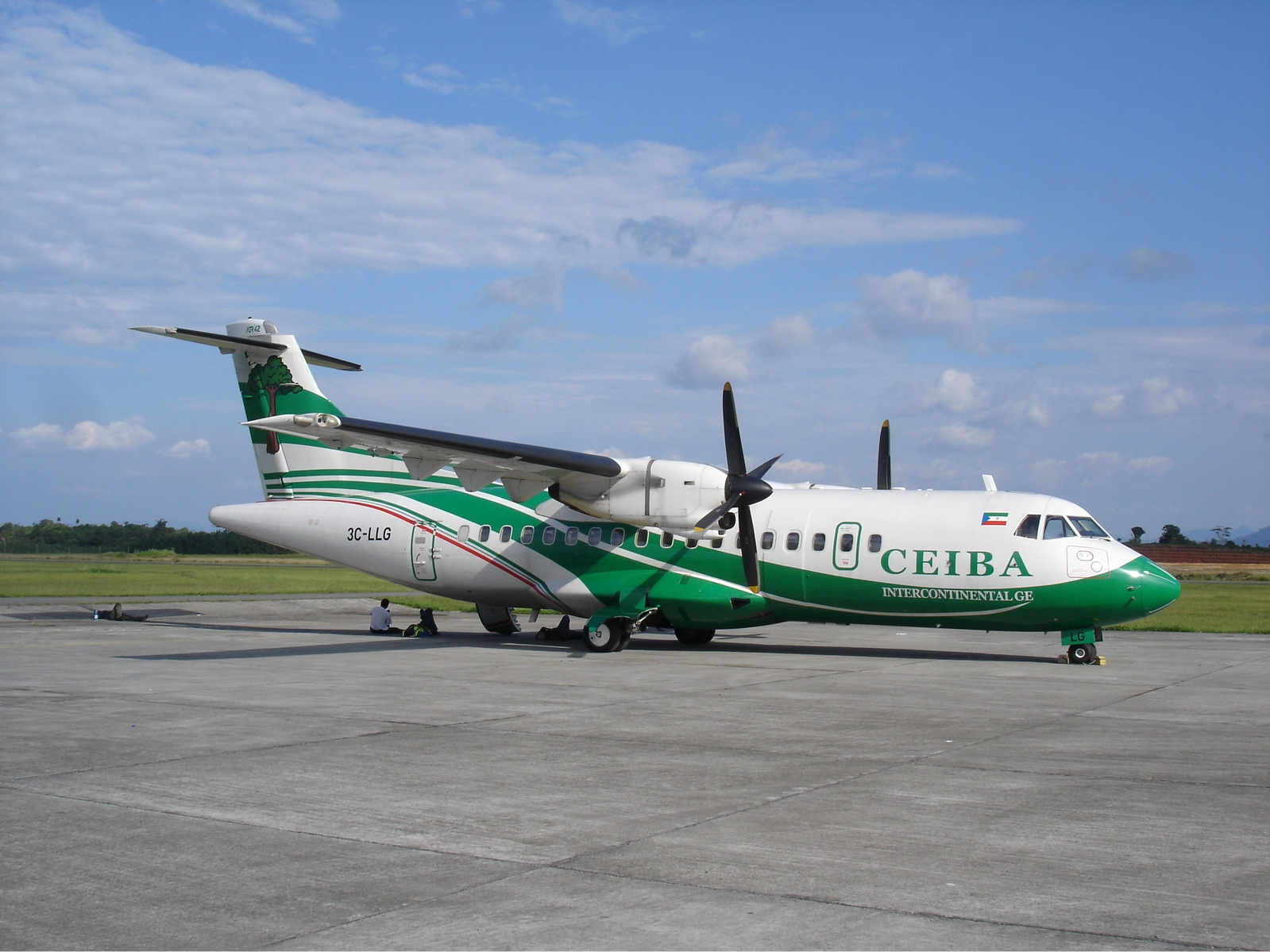
A CEIBA Intercontinental ATR 42-320 at Bata Airport

CEIBA Intercontinental flies to the following destinations as of October 2023:

Country	City	Airport	Notes	Refs
Benin	Cotonou	Cadjehoun Airport	—	
Cameroon	Douala	Douala International Airport	Terminated	
Equatorial Guinea	Bata	Bata Airport	—	
Equatorial Guinea	Malabo	Malabo International Airport	Hub	
Equatorial Guinea	Mengomeyén	President Obiang Nguema International Airport	—	
Equatorial Guinea	San Antonio de Palé	Annobón Airport	Terminated	
Gabon	Libreville	Libreville International Airport	Terminated	
Ghana	Accra	Accra International Airport	Terminated	
Ivory Coast	Abidjan	Port Bouet Airport	Terminated	
Republic of the Congo	Brazzaville	Maya-Maya Airport	Terminated	
Republic of the Congo	Pointe-Noire	Pointe Noire Airport	Terminated	
São Tomé and Príncipe	São Tomé	São Tomé International Airport	Terminated	
Senegal	Dakar	Blaise Diagne International Airport	Terminated	
Spain	Madrid	Adolfo Suárez Madrid–Barajas Airport	Terminated	
Togo	Lomé	Lomé–Tokoin International Airport	—	

CEIBA Intercontinental currently has an Interline agreement with APG Airlines and a partnership with Egyptair for technical support, training, and route expansion. Previously, it had a partnership with STP Airways.

== Fleet ==
=== Current fleet ===
As of July 2026, Ceiba Intercontinental operates the following aircraft:

CEIBA Intercontinental fleet
Aircraft	Total	Orders	Passengers				Notes
Aircraft	Total	Orders	F	J	Y	Total	Notes
ATR 42-300F	1	—	—	—	—	Cargo	
ATR 72-500	1	—	–	–	68	68	
Boeing 767-300ER	1	—	Unknown				
Boeing 777-200LR	1	—	Unknown				
Total	4	—					

=== Former fleet ===
As of August 2025, Ceiba Intercontinental operated 1 ATR 42-300F, 1 ATR 72-500, 1 Boeing 767-300ER

Ceiba Intercontinental previously operated the following aircraft:

CEIBA Intercontinental former fleet
Aircraft	Notes
ATR 42-500	
Boeing 737-800	
Boeing 777-200LR	operated by White Airways

== Accidents and incidents ==
CEIBA Intercontinental had two notable aviation accidents involving Boeing 737s:

- 5 September 2015 – a Boeing 737-800, operating as Flight 071 from Dakar to Cotonou, collided with a HS-125 air ambulance flying from Ouagadougou, Burkina Faso, to Dakar, Senegal. The Boeing 737 diverted to Malabo where it landed safely. The air ambulance apparently suffered a decompression incident and is believed to have crashed in the Atlantic Ocean.
- 29 August 2024 – the same as aircraft as above, now registered in Ethiopia as ET-AWR, was operating as Flight 205, from Bata Airport, Equatorial Guinea to Malabo, overran the runway after landing in heavy rain. The aircraft was substantially damaged, but all passengers and crew were evacuated via the emergency slides injury-free.
