= Djibloho Dam =

Dam in Equatorial Guinea

- Location within Equatorial Guinea
- Country: Equatorial Guinea
- Location: Wele-Nzas
- Coordinates: 1°34′58.44″N 10°35′38.51″E
- Purpose: Power
- Status: Operational
- Construction began: 2008
- Opening date: 2012; 14 years ago
- Owner: Sociedad de Electricidad de Guinea Ecuatorial

Dam and spillways
- Type of dam: Gravity
- Impounds: Wele River
- Height: 22 m (72 ft)
- Length: 274 m (899 ft)
- Spillway type: Overflow, controlled

Power Station
- Commission date: 2012
- Turbines: 4 x 30 MW (40,000 hp) Francis-type
- Installed capacity: 120 MW (160,000 hp)

The Djibloho Dam is a gravity dam on the Wele River near Djibloho in Wele-Nzas, Equatorial Guinea. The primary purpose of the dam is hydroelectric power generation and it supports a 120 megawatts (160,000 hp) power station, providing power to the capital Ciudad de la Paz. Construction on the project began in 2008 and it was inaugurated in October 2012. It is the largest hydroelectric power station in the country. Most of the project's cost was funded by the host government but some funds were provided by the Chinese government. Sinohydro constructed the dam and power station.
