= GEPetrol =

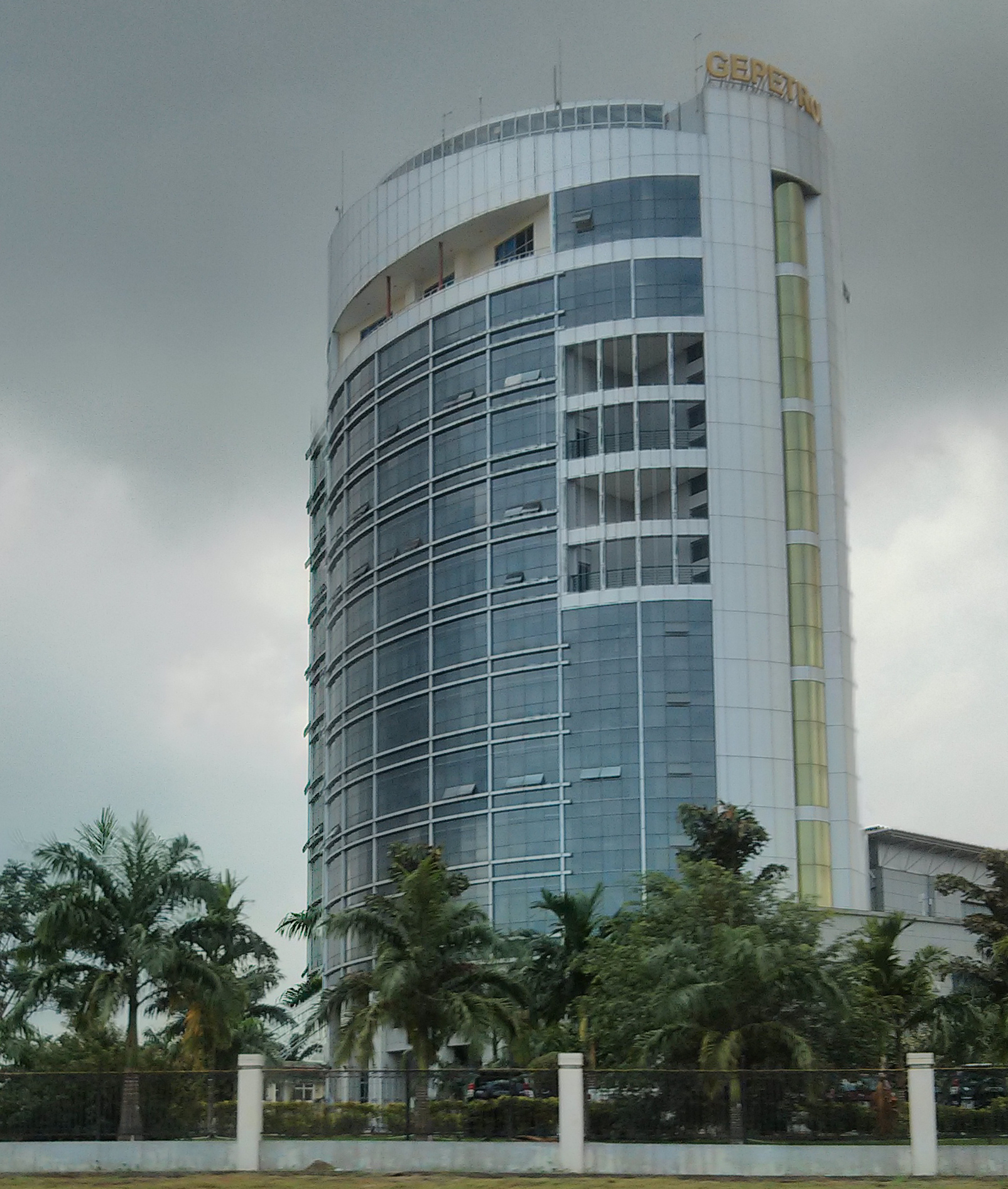
Headquarters of GEPetrol in Malabo Dos. Gepetrol is the national oil company of Equatorial Guinea.

GEPetrol is the national oil company of Equatorial Guinea. The company was founded in 2002 after the writing of a presidential decree. The company reports to the Ministry of Mines, Industry and Energy. GEPetrol's director is Teresa Isabel Nnang Avomo. The company maintains its office in Malabo.

In October 2017, Kosmos Energy signed three production-sharing contracts with Equatorial Guinea for the EG-21, S, and W offshore blocks. Under the contract, Kosmos will hold an 80% stake in each block, while a national GEPetrol will hold the remaining stake.

In September 2018, two former oil executives from SBM Offshore were sentenced to prison and fined for involvement in an international bribery scheme involving officials from GEPetrol and a number of other state-owned oil companies.

== See also ==
- Energy in Equatorial Guinea
