= Mengomeyén =

- Location in Equatorial Guinea
- Coordinates: 1°41′35″N 11°02′03″E
- Country: Equatorial Guinea
- Province: Wele-Nzas

Population (2001)
  - Total: 15,644
- Climate: Aw

Mengomeyén is a town located in the province of Wele-Nzas, on Río Muni, mainland Equatorial Guinea.

The town is located near what is planned to be the country's future capital, Ciudad de la Paz, and is also site of President Obiang Nguema International Airport.
