= Malabo International Airport =

Airport in Equatorial Guinea

Malabo International Airport Aeropuerto Internacional de Malabo
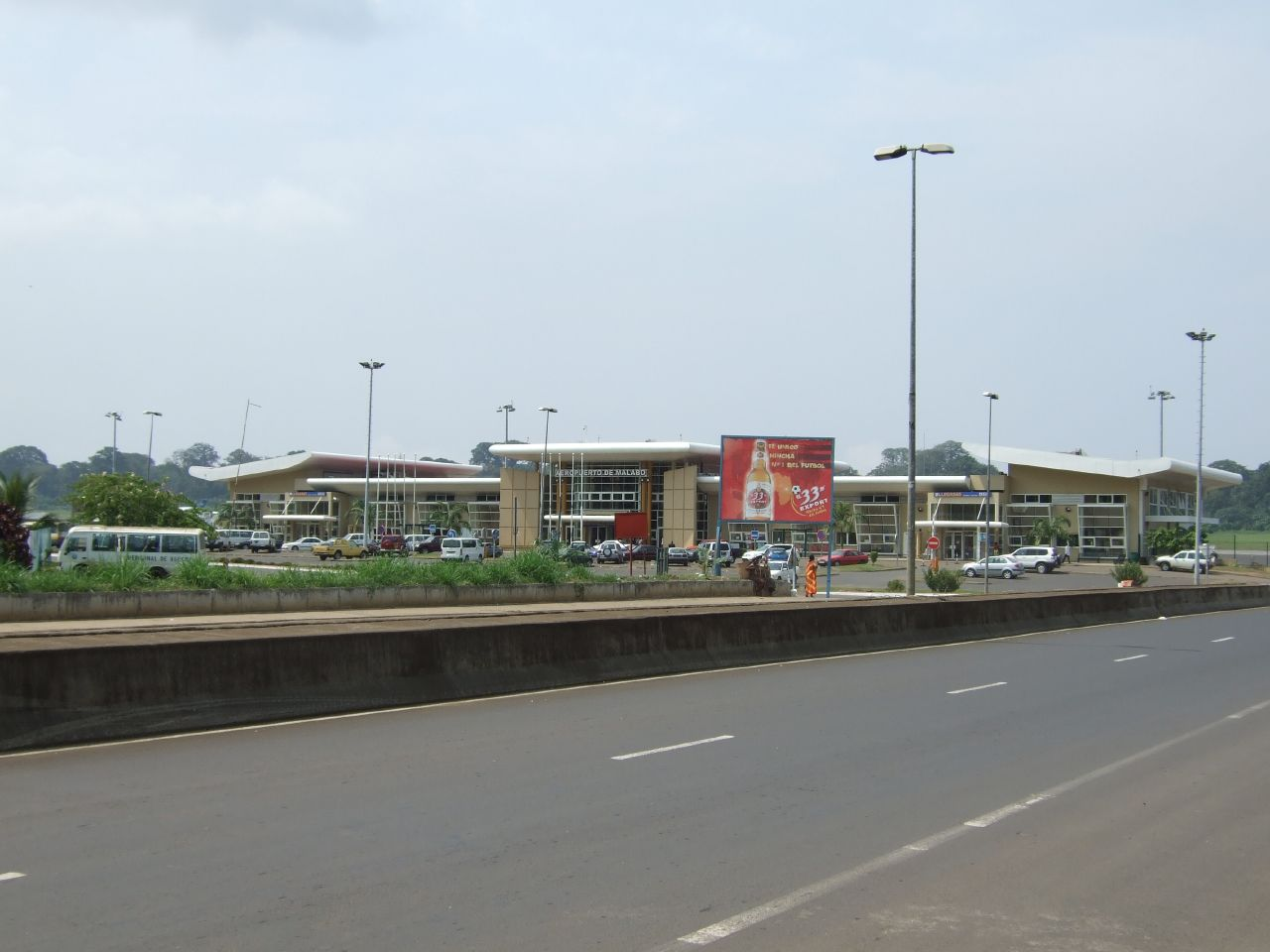
- IATA: SSG; ICAO: FGSL

Summary
- Airport type: Military/Public
- Owner: The government
- Operator: Aeropuertos De Guinea Ecuatorial (ADGE)
- Serves: Malabo
- Location: Bioko, Equatorial Guinea
- Hub for: CEIBA Intercontinental; Cronos Airlines
- Elevation AMSL: 23 m (75 ft)
- Coordinates: 03°45′18″N 08°42′31″E

Map
- Location of airport in Equatorial Guinea

Runways
Direction	Length		Surface
Direction	m	ft	Surface
04/22	2,940	9,647	Concrete

Statistics (2020)
- Passengers: 237,376
- Flights: 6,817
- INEGE

Malabo Airport or Saint Isabel Airport (IATA: SSG, ICAO: FGSL) (Spanish: Aeropuerto de Malabo) is an airport located at Punta Europa, Bioko Island, Equatorial Guinea. The airport was named after the then capital, Malabo, approximately 9 kilometres (5.6 mi) to the east.

== Airlines and destinations ==
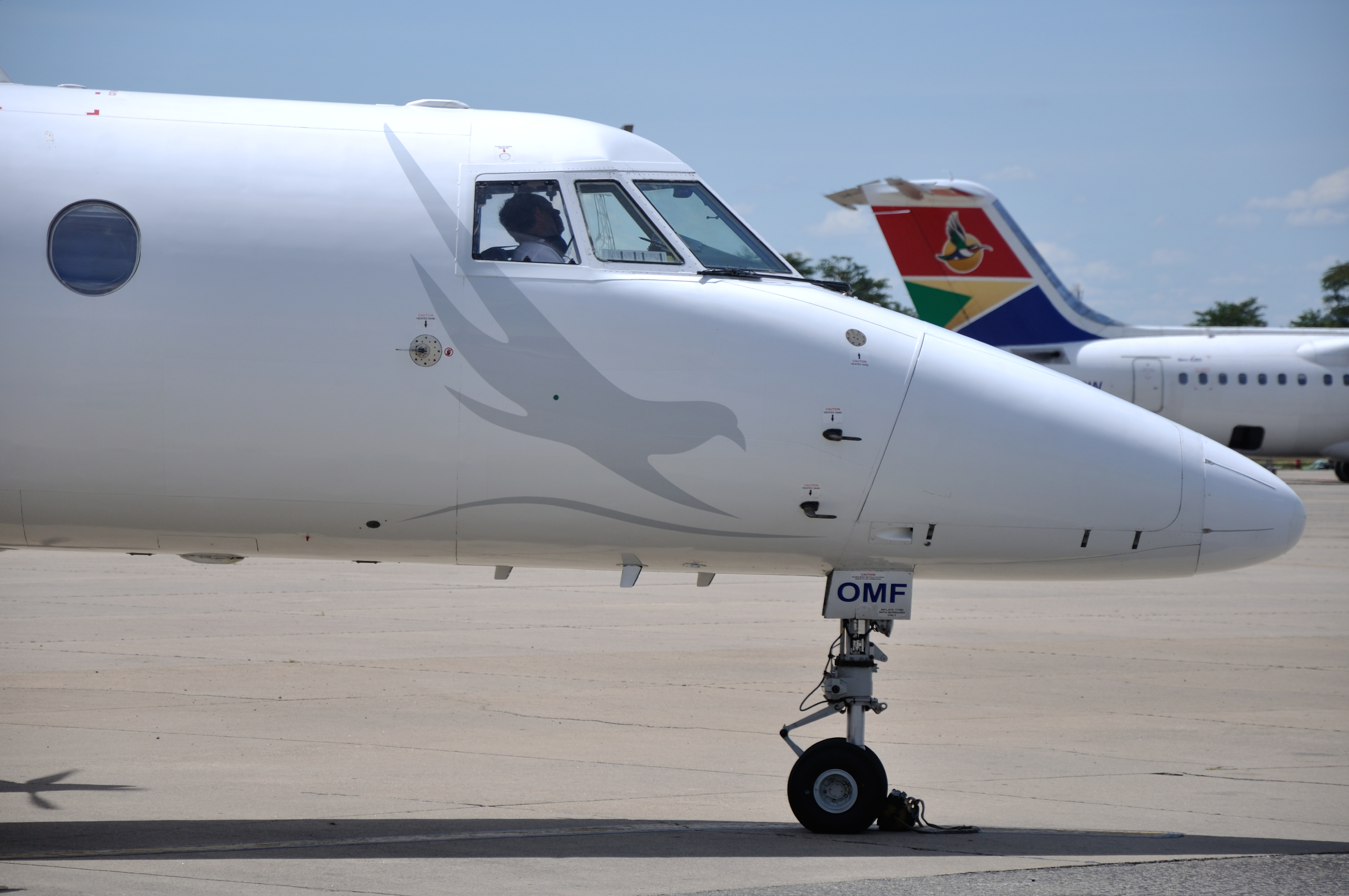
Malabo International Airport, April 2013

Airlines	Destinations
Afrijet	Douala, Libreville
Air France	Paris–Charles de Gaulle
ASKY Airlines	Lomé, Yaoundé
CEIBA Intercontinental	Bata, Lomé, Mengomeyén
Cronos Airlines	Bata, Douala, Port Harcourt
Ethiopian Airlines	Addis Ababa, Douala
Lufthansa	Frankfurt
Plus Ultra Líneas Aéreas	Madrid
Royal Air Maroc	Casablanca
ValueJet	Port Harcourt
World2Fly	Seasonal charter: Madrid

== See also ==
- List of airports in Equatorial Guinea
- Transport in Equatorial Guinea
- Bata Airport
