= List of defunct airlines of Senegal =

This is a list of defunct airlines of Senegal.

Airline	Image	IATA	ICAO	Callsign	Commenced operations	Ceased operations	Notes
Aero Services			RSG	SERVO	1993	2010	Operated CASA C-212 Aviocar
Africa Air Assistance					2007	2009	
Africair Service		FF	FFB	FOXTROT FOXTROT	1983	1984	Operated CASA C-212 Aviocar
African West Air		3F	AFC		1991	1994	Operated Douglas DC-10, Boeing 757
Afrique Cargo Service Senegal			NFS		2003	2004	Operated Antonov An-12BP
Air Afrique		RK	RKA	AIRAFRIC	1961	2002	
Air Charter					1977	1982	
Air Saint Louis			LOU	AIR SAINT LOUIS	?	?	
Air Sénégal		DS	DSB		1971	2000	Renamed to Air Sénégal International
Air Sénégal (CSTA)		DS	DSB		1962	1971	Renamed to Air Sénégal
Air Sénégal International		V7	SNG	AIR SENEGAL	2001	2009	
Atlantis Airlines		9V	ALS		2001	2008	
Eagle International			SEG	SEN-EAGLE	1992	1997	Operated Agusta-Bell 206, Piper Cheyenne
Georgian Cargo Airlines Africa			GGF	GEORGIAN AFRICA	2002	2009	
Senegal Airlines		DN	SGG	SENEGAL AIR	2009	2016	
Sénégal Airways			SGW		2004	2004	Operated Boeing 737
SenegalAir			SGL		1985	2006	Operated BAe 125
Sonatra-Air Senegal		DS			1963	1971	
Sunu Air			SUG	SUNU AIR	2003	2005	Operated Fokker F27
Transport Aerien Ouest African			OUA	QUEST AFRICAN	?	?	
Tropic Air Service Company (TASC)					1987	1997	Operated Piper Navajo

== See also ==
- List of airlines of Senegal
- List of airports in Senegal
