= Dakar International Airport =

Dakar International Airport may refer to:

- Blaise Diagne International Airport, a passenger airport opened in 2017 near Diass, Senegal
- Léopold Sédar Senghor International Airport, a cargo and military airport near Yoff, Senegal
