= Léopold Sédar Senghor International Airport =

Léopold Sédar Senghor International Airport Aéroport international Léopold-Sédar-Senghor
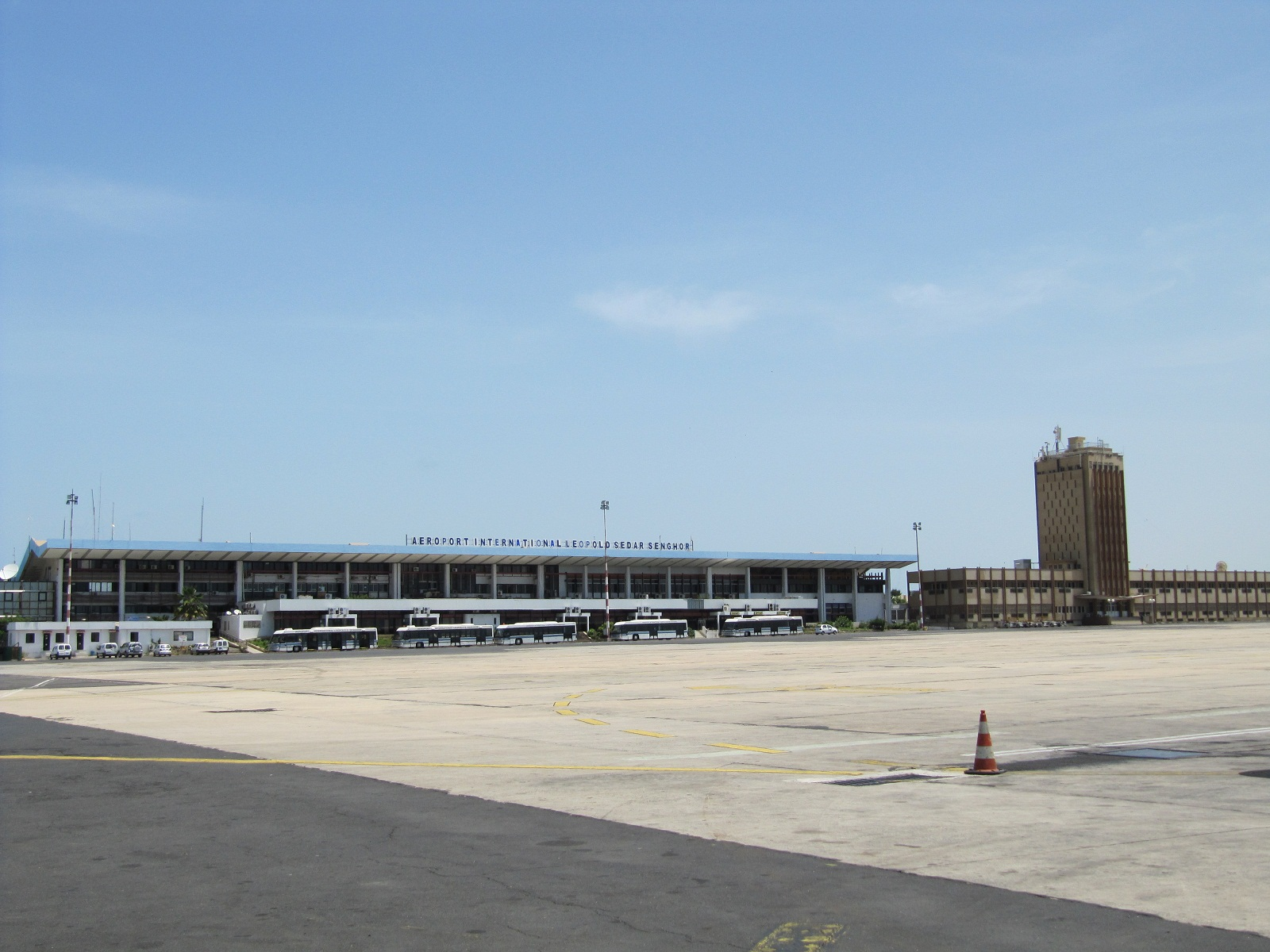
- IATA: DKR; ICAO: GOOY

Summary
- Airport type: Public / Military
- Serves: Dakar
- Location: Yoff, Senegal
- Elevation AMSL: 85 ft (26 m)
- Coordinates: 14°44′22″N 017°29′24″W
- Website: aeroport-dakar.com aeroportdakar.com

Map
- Location of airport in Senegal

Runways
Direction	Length		Surface
Direction	m	ft	Surface
18/36	3,490	11,450	Asphalt
~~03/21~~	~~1,500~~	~~4,921~~	~~Asphalt~~

Statistics (2013)
- Passengers: 2,200,000
- Source: Airport website, DAFIF

Léopold Sédar Senghor International Airport (French: Aéroport international Léopold-Sédar-Senghor, IATA: DKR, ICAO: GOOY) is an international freight and former passenger airport serving Dakar, the capital of Senegal. The airport is situated near the town of Yoff, a northern suburb of Dakar. It was known as Dakar-Yoff International Airport (French: Aéroport international de Dakar-Yoff) until 9 October 1996, when it was renamed in honor of Léopold Sédar Senghor (1906–2001), the first president of Senegal.

== History ==
In the 1920s and 1930s, Dakar was originally served by Ouakam Airfield, which operated airmail services and civilian transport by Air France. By 1943, the airfield was too small for heavy aircraft, and was unable to handle growing air traffic. In 1944, Mullard Airfield (now Dakar Airport) was established. By the 1960s, French Air Force operations were relocated from the old airfield to Mullard Airfield.

During World War II, Dakar Airport was a key link in the United States Army Air Forces Air Transport Command Natal-Dakar air route, which provided a transoceanic link between Brazil and French West Africa after 1942. Massive amounts of cargo were stored at Dakar, which were then transported along the North African Cairo-Dakar transport route for cargo, transiting aircraft and personnel. From Dakar, flights were made to Dakhla Airport, near Villa Cisneros in what was then Spanish Sahara, or to Atar Airport, depending on the load on the air route. In addition to being the western terminus of the North African route, Dakar was the northern terminus for the South African route, which transported personnel to Pretoria, South Africa, with numerous stopovers at Robertsfield (now Roberts International Airport), Liberia, the Belgian Congo and Northern Rhodesia.

Before the introduction of long-range jets in the mid-1970s, it was an important stopover point for the routes between Europe and South America, along with the Canary Islands.

From 21 January 1976 to 31 March 1982, Air France Concordes used the airport as a refueling stop between Paris and Rio de Janeiro on Wednesdays and Sundays.

The airport was a Space Shuttle landing site until 1987, when it was determined that a dip in the runway could damage the shuttle upon landing.

It was one of the five main hubs of the now defunct multi-national airline Air Afrique.

Aeroflot used to serve the airport from the 1970s, it flew the Moscow-Dakar route with stopovers midroute. In the 1990s, Aeroflot replaced the route with a nonstop flight from Moscow to Dakar. However, this service was terminated somewhere around 2000. Marking the end of the airline’s 3 decades-long presence in the airport.

The airport has often been used as a stopover on flights between North America and Southern Africa. Delta Air Lines started service on 4 December 2006 between Atlanta and Johannesburg, with an intermediate stop in Dakar. This stopover has since been removed, with Dakar now served nonstop by Delta from New York–JFK. South African Airways used Dakar as a stopover with both its flights from Johannesburg to Washington and New York. The stopover for the New York–JFK flight was later removed, while the Johannesburg to Washington–Dulles flight now operates via Accra.

Senegal Airlines had a hub operation and their headquarters at the airport before the company's demise in April, 2016.

Construction of a replacement airport, Blaise Diagne International, 45 kilometres (28 mi) inland from Léopold Sédar Senghor, began in 2007. Saudi Binladin Group constructed the new airport, named after the first black African elected to France's parliament in 1914, Blaise Diagne. It was initially expected to take 30 months to build and is designed for an initial capacity of 3 million passengers a year – almost double the 1.7 million annual traffic handled by the existing airport. Blaise Diagne was delayed several times and finally opened on 7 December 2017. As of March 2020 Senghor Airport serves only charter flights and scheduled cargo services, but not regular passenger flights.

== Other facilities ==
The head office of Agence Nationale de l'Aviation Civile du Sénégal is also on the airport property.

The International Civil Aviation Organization (ICAO) has its Western and Central African (WACAF) Office on the airport property.

At one time Air Sénégal International had its head office on the grounds of the airport.

The airport is also home to the French Air Force's Dakar-Ouakam Air Base (Base aérienne Dakar-Ouakam; also known as Air Base 160, Base aérienne 160 Dakar-Ouakam). The Dakar-Ouakam Air Base formed the military section of the airport.

The airport can handle wide body jets, including in the past the Airbus A340-600 from South African Airways, and the Boeing 777-200 from Air France. In 2015, the airport served about 1,986,000 passengers.

== Airlines and destinations ==
=== Passenger ===
Since the opening of Blaise Diagne International Airport in 2017, commercial operations were shifted there. However, in January 2024, Air Senegal launched flights to Saint-Louis (XLS) on Mondays and Fridays. There are plans to use Léopold Sédar Senghor International Airport (DKR) as a domestic hub airport for Air Senegal with flights to the interior of the country to Kédougou (KGG), Tambacounda (TUD), and Matam (MAX) using newly acquired Czech Let L-410 aircraft.

=== Cargo ===
Airlines	Destinations
Emirates SkyCargo	Campinas–Viracopos, Dubai–Al Maktoum
Lufthansa Cargo	Buenos Aires–Ezeiza, Campinas–Viracopos, Montevideo
Med Airlines	Casablanca

== Statistics ==
Annual statistics
Year	Total passengers	Change	Cargo (in tonnes)	Change
2001	1,279,028	N/A	23,387	N/A
2002	1,358,538	+6.2% ▲	16,953	-38.0% ▼
2003	1,482,726	+9.1% ▲	17,051	+0.6% ▲
2004	1,566,573	+5.7% ▲	21,159	+24.1% ▲
2005	1,605,010	+2.5% ▲	24,795	+17.2% ▲
2006	1,676,881	+4.5% ▲	22,032	-12.5% ▼
2007	1,821,956	+8.7% ▲	24,771	+12.4% ▲
2008	1,802,559	-1.1% ▼	21,789	-13.7% ▼
2009	1,554,546	-13.8% ▼	21,572	-1.0% ▼
2010	1,687,006	+8.5% ▲	24,112	+11.8% ▲

== Incidents ==
- On 29 August 1960, Air France Flight 343 crashed while attempting to land at Dakar-Yoff Airport during the precursor to what became Hurricane Donna. All 63 passengers and crew on board were killed.
- On February 12, 2000, an Air Afrique Airbus A300 with 182 occupants from Dakar to Paris suffered an incident when the left landing gear collapsed. All 182 occupants survived uninjured but the aircraft was written off.
