= Air Sénégal International =

Airline of Senegal

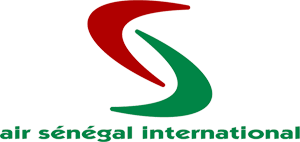
IATA	ICAO	Call sign
V7	SNG	AIR SENEGAL
- Founded: 1 February 1971
- Ceased operations: 24 April 2009
- Hubs: Dakar-Yoff-Léopold Sédar Senghor International Airport
- Fleet size: 5
- Destinations: 19
- Parent company: Royal Air Maroc (51%); Senegalese Government (49%)
- Headquarters: Dakar, Senegal
- Key people: Mohamed El Yaalaoui (General Manager)
- Website: air-senegal-international.com/asi_english/

Air Sénégal International was an airline with its head office in Dakar, Senegal. It was a regional carrier operating a scheduled domestic network and regional flights to neighbouring countries. It also operated charter and air taxi flights. Its main base was Dakar-Yoff-Léopold Sédar Senghor International Airport.

On April 24, 2009, the airline suspended all of its operations.

== History ==
The airline was established on 1 February 1971 as Air Sénégal and started operations on 23 February 2001. It was restructured as an international carrier following the acquisition of a majority stake by Royal Air Maroc in 2001. It was part of Groupe Royal Air Maroc, who owned 51% of the company's shares, with 49% being held by the Senegalese government.

At one time the airline had its head office on the grounds of Dakar-Yoff-Léopold Sédar Senghor International Airport in Yoff, Senegal.

In 2006 the airline disclosed losses of $16 million. In 2007, the Senegalese government stated that effective 5 November 2006, it would purchase a further 26% of the airline, raising its stake to 75%. The Senegalese government stated that support from Royal Air Maroc had "shown its limitations", and that the airline needed to be recapitalised.

In late 2009, a new airline was announced to replace Air Sénégal International. The new airline was called Senegal Airlines and had a fleet of 4 Airbus A320 aircraft and 2 Airbus A330 aircraft. Operations commenced in January 2011, but ceased by April 2016. Senegal Airlines was then also replaced as flag carrier by Air Senegal, which began operations in May 2018.

== Destinations ==
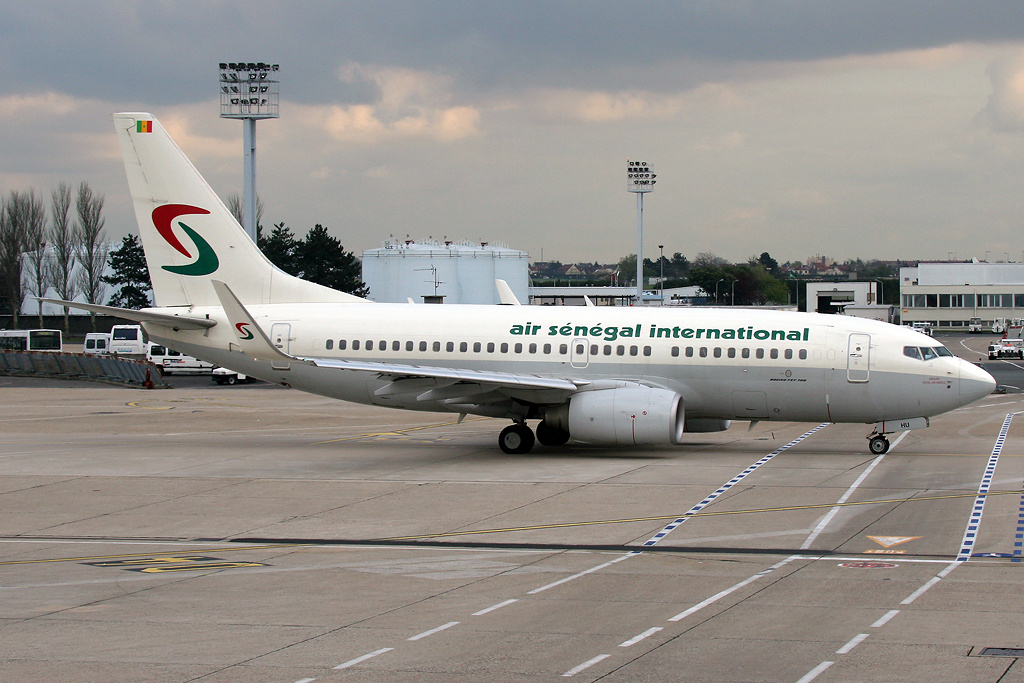
An Air Sénégal International Boeing 737-700 at Paris Orly Airport in 2007.

As of 2007, Air Sénégal International operated scheduled passenger flights to the following destinations:

=== Africa ===
- Benin
  - Cotonou - Cadjehoun Airport
- Burkina Faso
  - Ouagadougou - Ouagadougou Airport
- Cape Verde
  - Praia - Nelson Mandela International Airport
- Côte d'Ivoire
  - Abidjan - Port Bouet Airport
- The Gambia
  - Banjul - Banjul International Airport
- Guinea-Bissau
  - Bissau - Osvaldo Vieira International Airport
- Guinea
  - Conakry - Conakry International Airport
- Mali
  - Bamako - Senou International Airport
- Mauritania
  - Nouakchott - Nouakchott International Airport
- Niger
  - Niamey - Diori Hamani International Airport
- Senegal
  - Cap Skirring - Cap Skirring Airport
  - Dakar - Dakar-Yoff-Léopold Sédar Senghor International Airport
  - Saint Louis - Saint Louis Airport
  - Tambacounda - Tambacounda Airport
  - Ziguinchor - Ziguinchor Airport
- Togo
  - Lomé - Tokoin Airport

=== Europe ===
- France
  - Marseille - Marseille Provence Airport
  - Paris - Orly Airport
- Italy
  - Milan - Malpensa Airport
- Spain
  - Gran Canaria - Gran Canaria Airport
  - Madrid - Barajas Airport

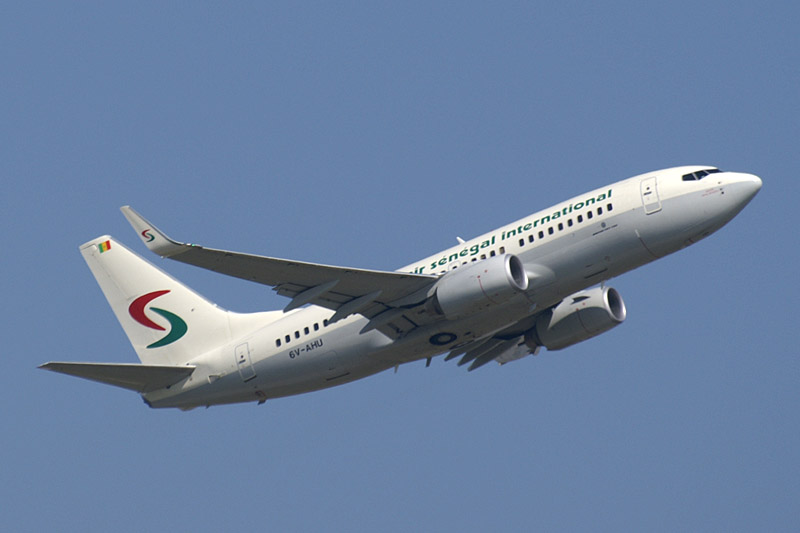
Air Sénégal International Boeing 737-700

== Fleet ==
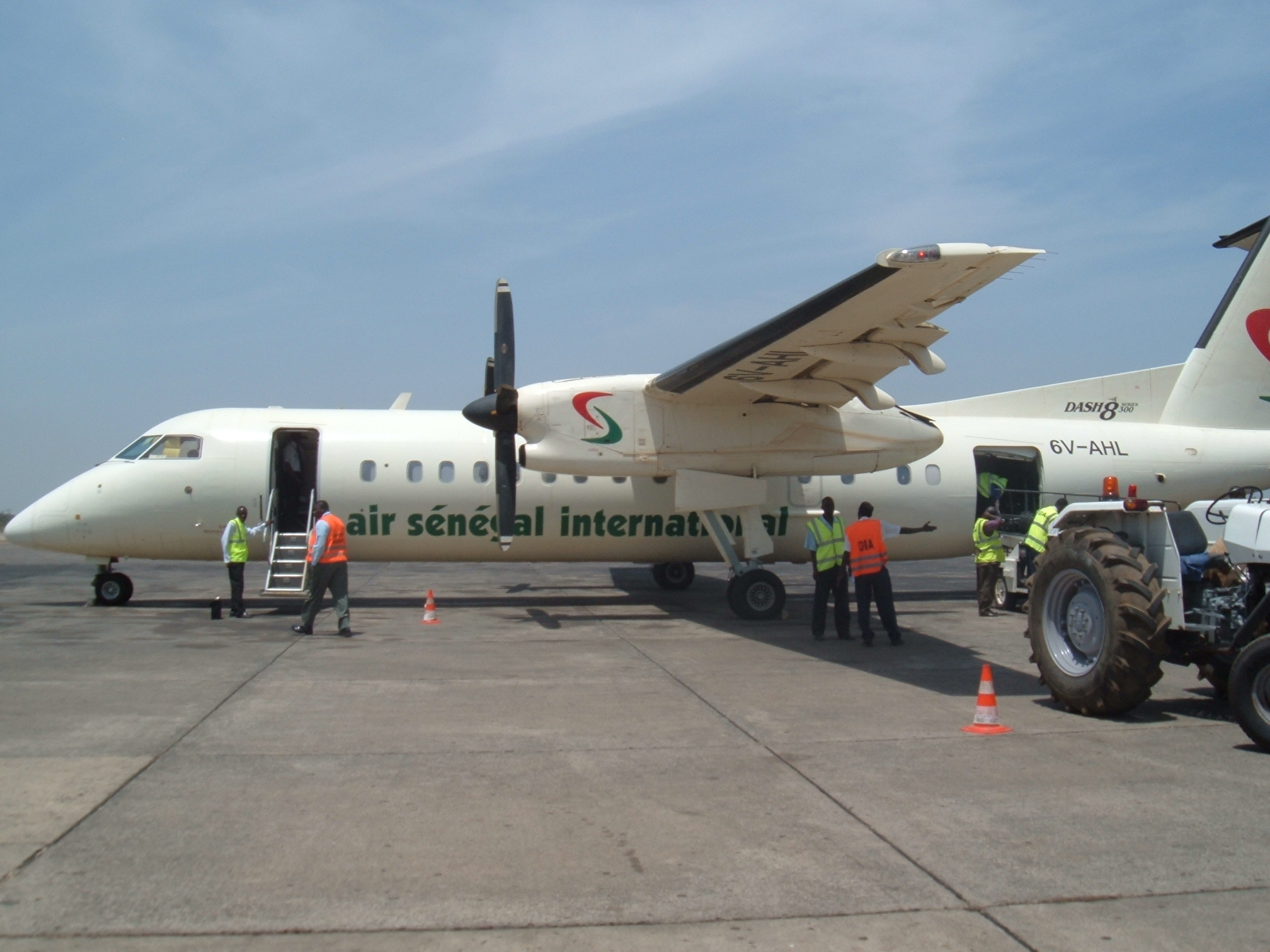
Air Sénégal International Dash8 300 at the BJL Airport

At March 2008, the Air Sénégal International fleet consisted of the following aircraft:

Air Sénégal International fleet
Aircraft	Total	Passengers (Etoile/Economy)	Notes
Boeing 737-700	4	114 (12/102)	Medium haul routes
Bombardier Dash 8 Q300	1	50 (0/50)	Short haul
Total Number of Aircraft	5		

=== Previously operated ===
At August 2006 the airline also operated:

- 1 Boeing 737-200
- 1 Boeing 737-500
