= List of shipwrecks in October 1852 =

The list of shipwrecks in October 1852 includes ships sunk, foundered, wrecked, grounded, or otherwise lost during October 1852.

== 1 October ==
List of shipwrecks: 1 October 1852
Ship	State	Description
Archibald	Prussia	The barque was wrecked at "Mottauz", 50 nautical miles (93 km) east of Port au Platte, Dominican Republic. Her crew were rescued. She was on a voyage from Bordeaux, Gironde, France to New Orleans, Louisiana, United States.
Constance	United Kingdom	The ship was driven ashore at Cabo de Santa Maria, Portugal. All on board were rescued. She was on a voyage from Constantinople, Ottoman Empire to Queenstown, County Cork. She had been refloated by 15 October.
Georgia	United States	The ship was abandoned in the Atlantic Ocean. Her crew were rescued. She was on a voyage from Cardiff, Glamorgan, United Kingdom to New York.
Helene	Netherlands	The schooner was wrecked off Eierland, North Holland with the loss of all hands. She was on a voyage from Bristol, Gloucestershire to Bremen or Hamburg.
Lytham Lifeboat	United Kingdom	The lifeboat capsized off the Horse Bank, in the Irish Sea off Lytham St. Annes, Lancashire with the loss of eight of her ten crew.

== 2 October ==
List of shipwrecks: 2 October 1852
Ship	State	Description
Albert	Denmark	The ship was driven ashore and wrecked at Glumslöv, Sweden.
Anna Maria	Denmark	The ship ran aground off Slipshaven. She was on a voyage from Saxkjøbing to London, United Kingdom.
Beerta Schuringa	Netherlands	The ship was driven ashore at Copenhagen, Denmark. She was on a voyage from Newcastle upon Tyne, Northumberland, United Kingdom to Stettin.
Brutus	United Kingdom	The ship was driven onto the Dragoen Sandbank, off Copenhagen. She was on a voyage from Newcastle upon Tyne to Stettin.
Catherine Margarethe	Kingdom of Hanover	The ship capsized and sank off Norderney with the loss of all but one of her crew.
Davinia, or Dwina	United Kingdom	The snow capsized and sank in the English Channel 25 nautical miles (46 km) south east of Beachy Head, Sussex. Her crew survived. She was on a voyage from Sunderland, County Durham to Harfleur, Seine-Inférieure, France.
Diana	United Kingdom	The ship capsized in the English Channel. Her crew were rescued. She was on a voyage from Sunderland, County Durham to Halifax, Nova Scotia, British North America.
Elsabe	Denmark	The ewer foundered in the North Sea off Whitby, Yorkshire, United Kingdom. Her crew were rescued. She was on a voyage from Sunderland to Amsterdam, North Holland, Netherlands.
Fame	United Kingdom	The ship was wrecked on Borkum, Kingdom of Hanover. Her crew were rescued. She was on a voyage from Cardiff, Glamorgan to Leer, Kingdom of Hanover.
Flower of Moray	United Kingdom	The schooner departed from a Baltic port for Findhorn, Aberdeenshire. No further trace, presumed foundered with the loss of all hands.
Gesina	Netherlands	The ship was sighted off Helsingør, Denmark whilst on a voyage from Danzig to Amsterdam, North Holland. No further trace, presumed foundered with the loss of all hands.
Incognita	Spain	The ship departed from New York on this date. No further trace, presumed foundered with the loss of all hands.
James and Charlotte	United Kingdom	The sloop was abandoned in the English Channel off the coast of Dorset. She was on a voyage from Southampton, Hampshire to Plymouth, Devon. She was subsequently taken into Weymouth, Dorset.
Kitty	United Kingdom	The ship was driven ashore north of Helsingborg, Sweden.
Margaretha	Netherlands	The ship was driven ashore on Juist, Kingdom of Hanover. Her crew were rescued. She was on a voyage from Danzig to Amsterdam, North Holland.
Perthshire	United Kingdom	The ship was driven ashore on the Droogden and was damaged. She was on a voyage from Grangemouth, Stirlingshire to Riga, Russia. She was refloated and taken into Copenhagen in a leaky condition.
Portland	(United Kingdom of Great Britain and Ireland) British North America	The brig was wrecked in the Caicos Islands. Her crew were rescued. She was on a voyage from Cap-Haïtien, Haiti to Philadelphia, Pennsylvania, United States.
Ranger	United Kingdom	The brig ran aground and sank off Düne, Heligoland. Her crew were rescued.
Sympathie	Prussia	The ship was wrecked on Ven, Sweden. Her crew were rescued.
Tver (Тверь)	Imperial Russian Navy	The transport ship was driven ashore and sank at Reval. Her crew were rescued.

== 3 October ==
List of shipwrecks: 3 October 1852
Ship	State	Description
Africa	United Kingdom	The ship was driven ashore and wrecked at Helsingør, Denmark. She was on a voyage from London to Königsberg, Prussia.
Albert	Belgium	The ship was wrecked near Helsingør. She was on a voyage from Rostock to Antwerp.
Amaranth	France	The ship was driven ashore near Dunkirk, Nord.
Annechina Engelina	Netherlands	The ship was driven ashore at Swinemünde, Prussia. She was on a voyage from Amsterdam, North Holland to Stettin. She was refloated on 12 October and taken into Swinemünde.
Atalanta	Sweden	The ship was driven ashore on Læsø, Denmark. She was on a voyage from Kalmar to London.
Augusta	United Kingdom	The ship was driven ashore and wrecked near Helsingør.
Breeze	United Kingdom	The ship ran aground off Gotland, Sweden. She was on a voyage from Kronstadt, Russia to Gloucester. She was refloated and taken into Katthammarsvik, Sweden for repairs.
Charlotte Elizabeth	Sweden	The ship was wrecked at Bergsviken with the loss of her captain.
Chetty	United Kingdom	The ship was driven ashore and wrecked at Helsingør. She was on a voyage from Riga, Russia to London.
Christina	Sweden	The ship was wrecked off Halmstad. She was on a voyage from Gothenburg to Stockholm.
Clement	United Kingdom	The barque was wrecked in the Turks Islands.
Collina	United Kingdom	The ship was driven ashore and wrecked on Seskar, Russia. Her crew were rescued. She was on a voyage from Kronstadt to Exeter, Devon.
Courier	United Kingdom	The ship ran aground off Gotland. She was on a voyage from Kronstadt to Devonport, Devon. She was refloated and taken into Slitohamn, Sweden for repairs.
Ellusion	United Kingdom	The ship was driven ashore and wrecked at Helsingør with the loss of ten of her crew.
Emanuel	Norway	The ship was wrecked on the South Goarkin, off Helsingør with the loss of three lives.
Fanny	United Kingdom	The ship was driven ashore and wrecked on Borkum, Kingdom of Hanover. Her crew were rescued. She was on a voyage from Cardiff, Glamorgan to Leer, Kingdom of Hanover.
Gesina	Netherlands	The galiot sank off Bornholm, Denmark. Her crew were rescued.
Gustav	Sweden	The ship was wrecked near Møn, Denmark with the loss of two of her crew. She was on a voyage from Kalmar to Rostock.
Haidee, and Sarah and Isabella	United Kingdom	Haidee was driven into Sarah and Isabella and sank at Reval, Russia. She was on a voyage from Saint Petersburg, Russia to Newcastle upon Tyne, Northumberland. Sarah and Isabella was on a voyage from Saint Petersburg to London. She was taken into Reval for repairs.
Hebe	United Kingdom	The ship was driven ashore and wrecked at Helsingør.
Helen	United Kingdom	The ship was driven ashore and damaged south of Saltholm, Denmark. She was on a voyage from Leith, Lothian to Saint Petersburg, Russia. She had been refloated by 11 October and found to be severely leaky.
Johanna Frederike	Denmark	The ship was driven ashore and wrecked at Helsingør.
Johanna Sophia	Hamburg	The ship was driven ashore on "Skallo", Sweden.
Julius	Denmark	The ship was driven ashore and wrecked at Helsingør.
Kitty	United Kingdom	The ship was driven ashore north of Helsingborg. Sweden. She was on a voyage from Grimsby, Lincolnshire to Riga.
Laurine	Denmark	The ship was driven ashore and wrecked at Helsingør.
Margarethe	Bremen	The ship was driven ashore on Sylt, Duchy of Holstein. She was on a voyage from Bremen to Christiansand, Norway.
Marie Louise	United Kingdom	The ship was driven ashore and wrecked near Helsingør. She was on a voyage from London to Königsberg. She was refloated on 10 October and taken into Helsingør.
Martha	Bremen	The ship was driven ashore on Sylt. She was on a voyage from Bremen to Christiansand.
Nathaniel Thompson	United States	The ship ran aground at Cardiff, Glamorgan, United Kingdom. She was on a voyage from Cardiff to New Orleans, Louisiana.
Neptunus	Denmark	The ship was driven ashore and wrecked at Helsingør.
Primus	Sweden	The ship ran aground off Hirtshals, Denmark. Her crew were rescued. She was on a voyage from Hull, Yorkshire, United Kingdom to Norrköping.
Skjold	Denmark	The ship was driven ashore and wrecked at Helsingør.
Virgil	United Kingdom	The ship was driven ashore and wrecked near Helsingør. Her crew survived. She was on a voyage from Sunderland, County Durham to Swinemünde, Prussia.
Wadias Sulbarie	Netherlands	The barque was wrecked in the Atlas Straits. Her crew were rescued.
Wanskapen	Denmark	The ship was driven ashore and wrecked near Helsingør.

== 4 October ==
List of shipwrecks: 4 October 1852
Ship	State	Description
Alexander von Humboldt	Stralsund	The ship was driven ashore south of "Amack". She was on a voyage from Newcastle upon Tyne, Northumberland, United Kingdom to Stralsund. She was refloated but consequently sank.
Ann	United Kingdom	The fishing smack sank off Drogheda, County Louth with the loss of four of her crew.
Bolton	United Kingdom	The barque was abandoned in the Atlantic Ocean 90 nautical miles (170 km) off "Realejo". Her eighteen crew survived. She was on a voyage from "Realejo" to Mazatlan, Cuba.
Carl Gustav	Sweden	The schooner was driven ashore and damaged near Copenhagen, Denmark.
Eaglet	United Kingdom	The brig foundered in the North Sea 12 nautical miles (22 km) off Lowestoft, Suffolk. Her crew took to a boat and were rescued by Ligo (United Kingdom). Eaglet was on a voyage from South Shields, County Durham to London.
Elizabeth	(United Kingdom of Great Britain and Ireland) Jersey	The ship was driven ashore and severely damaged between Kingsdown and St. Margaret's Bay, Kent. Her crew were rescued. She was on a voyage from Halifax, Nova Scotia, British North America to Havre de Grâce, Seine-Inférieure, France. She was refloated on 6 October and taken into Ramsgate, Kent.
Gezina	United Kingdom	The ship sank off Christiansoe Island, Prussia.
Haabets Anker	Hamburg	The sloop sank in the Elbe with the loss of all but one of her crew. The survivor was rescued by Magdalene Frederike (Hamburg).
Honoria	United Kingdom	The schooner was driven ashore and wrecked at Black Rock, Sussex. Her crew were rescued by the Brighton Lifeboat. She was on a voyage from Caen, Calvados, France to London.
Louisa Jane	(United Kingdom of Great Britain and Ireland) Isle of Man	The ship was driven ashore at Douglas. She was refloated but drove ashore again. She was refloated on 16 October and found to be severely damaged.
Marie	Stralsund	The ship capsized off Ystad, Sweden with the loss of one life. She was on a voyage from Stralsund to Copenhagen, Denmark.
Ocean Witch	United Kingdom	The schooner ran aground on the Gunfleet Sand, in the North Sea off the coast of Essex. She was on a voyage from London to Hull, Yorkshire. She was refloated with assistance of the tug John and William (United Kingdom) and some fishing smacks. She was taken into Harwich, Essex in a severely leaky condition.
St. Alexander	Russia	The ship was wrecked on the Aspo Rock with the loss of all hands. She was on a voyage from Helsinki, Grand Duchy of Finland to London.
Teresa	Kingdom of Lombardy–Venetia	The brig was wrecked on the Long Sand, in the Irish Sea off thecoast of County Wexford with the loss of four lives. Thirteen of the survivors were rescued by a pilot boat.
Wandvren	Sweden	The ship sank off Bornholm, Denmark. She was on a voyage from Kalmar to Flensburg, Duchy of Holstein.
Wanderer	United Kingdom	The brig ran aground on the Gunfleet Sand. She was refloated the next day with the assistance of six smacks and taken into the River Colne.

== 5 October ==
List of shipwrecks: 5 October 1852
Ship	State	Description
Adventure	United Kingdom	The ship was in collision with William (United Kingdom) and was beached at Caister-on-Sea, Norfolk. She was later refloated and taken into Great Yarmouth, Norfolk.
Alte Agent	Danzig	The full-rigged ship ran aground on Scroby Sands, Norfolk and sank with the loss of two of her fifteen crew. She was on a voyage from South Shields, County Durham, United Kingdom to Venice, Kingdom of Lombardy–Venetia.
Anna Deuling	Netherlands	The ship departed form Danzig for Amsterdam, North Holland. No further trace, presumed foundered with the loss of all hands.
Astrea	Norway	The ship was driven ashore north of Fredrikshavn, Denmark. She was on a voyage from Hartlepool, County Durham to Randers. She was refloated on 11 October and found to be severely leaky.
Augusta	United States	The ship was driven ashore near "Tahaina", Kingdom of Hawaii. she was later refloated and resumed her voyage.
Balmoral	United Kingdom	The ship was driven ashore at Faro, Portugal. She was on a voyage from Faro to Queenstown, County Cork. She was refloated on 7 October.
Belmont	United Kingdom	The ship ran aground at Faro, Portugal. She was on a voyage from Faro to Queenstown, County Cork. She was refloated on 7 October.
Blonde	France	The ship ran aground in the Gironde. She was on a voyage from Martinique to Bordeaux, Gironde. She had been refloated by 13 October and towed into Bordeaux.
Caroline	United Kingdom	The sloop ran aground and was damaged at Dunbar, Lothian. She was on a voyage from Sunderland, County Durham to Leith, Lothian.
Catharina	Norway	The schooner was driven ashore and wrecked at North Berwick, Lothian. Her crew were rescued. She was on a voyage from Hull, Yorkshire, United Kingdom to Dysart, Fife.
Crispin	United Kingdom	The ship was driven ashore at Dunbar. Her crew were rescued. She was on a voyage from Narva, Russia to Dundee, Forfarshire. She was refloated on 16 October and found to be severely damaged.
Edward	Prussia	The ship was driven ashore on Læsø, Denmark. She was on a voyage from Memel to Antwerp, Belgium. She was refloated and towed into Helsingør in a leaky condition.
Emmanuel	Norway	The ship was lost on the South Gwarken with the loss of three of the eleven people on board. She was on a voyage from Umeå, Sweden to Grimsby, Lincolnshire, United Kingdom.
Enterprise	United Kingdom	The ship ran aground on the Barnard Sand, in the North Sea off the coast of Suffolk. She was on a voyage from Hull, Yorkshire to London. She was refloated and taken into Lowestoft, Suffolk.
Esk	United Kingdom	The collier, a brig, struck the Sizewell Bank, in the North Sea off the coast of Suffolk and sank. Her crew were rescued by the steamship Princess Royal (United Kingdom). Esk was on a voyage from Hartlepool, County Durham to London.
Euphemia	United Kingdom	The brig ran aground on the Shipwash Sand, in the North Sea off the coast of Suffolk. She floated off and sank off the Whiting Sand with the loss of one life. She was on a voyage from Seaham, County Durham to London.
Euryanthe	Prussia	The ship was driven ashore on Læsø, Denmark. She was on a voyage from Memel to Antwerp, Belgium. She was refloated.
Favourite	United Kingdom	The ship was driven ashore at Troon, Ayrshire. She was on a voyage from Dublin to Troon.
Friendship	United Kingdom	The sloop sprang a leak and was beached at Hythe, Kent. Her crew were rescued. She was on a voyage from London to Chichester, Sussex. She was refloated the next day and taken into Folkestone, Kent.
John Wesley	(United Kingdom of Great Britain and Ireland) Guernsey	The ship was wrecked on the Battery Rocks, on the coast of County Durham. Her crew were rescued by the Tynemouth Lifeboat.
Laurel	United Kingdom	The ship was driven ashore east of Rye, Sussex. Her crew were rescued. She was refloated on 14 October.
Ondine	United Kingdom	The collier, a brig, ran aground on the Sizewell Bank. Her nine crew were rescued by the steamship Princess Royal (United Kingdom).
Rover	United Kingdom	The ship ran aground on the West Rocks, in the North Sea off the coast of Essex. She was on a voyage from Hartlepool to London. She was refloated and assisted into Harwich, Essex.
St. Leonard	France	The ship struck the pier at Boulogne, Pas-de-Calais and was wrecked with the loss of her captain. She was on a voyage from Bordeaux, Gironde to Boulogne.
Thomas and Ann	United Kingdom	The barque was driven ashore east of Rye. Her crew were rescued.
Union	United Kingdom	The ship departed from Margate, Kent for Ostend, West Flanders, Belgium. No further trace, presumed foundered with the loss of all hands.
Waterhen	United Kingdom	The Yorkshire billyboy was driven ashore at Aldeburgh, Suffolk. Her crew were rescued. She was on a voyage from Hull to Deptford Dockyard, Kent.
William	United Kingdom	The ship was driven ashore and wrecked between Dymchurch and New Romney, Kent. Her crew were rescued. She was on a voyage from Liverpool, Lancashire to Hastings, Sussex.

== 6 October ==
List of shipwrecks: 6 October 1852
Ship	State	Description
Concordia	Russia	The full-rigged ship was driven ashore in the Scheldt. She was on a voyage from Kertch to Antwerp, Belgium. She was refloated and taken into Antwerp in a leaky condition.
Era	United Kingdom	The ship ran aground at Hartlepool, County Durham. She was on a voyage from Sunderland, County Durham to Rochester, Kent.
Goede Vrienden	Kingdom of Hanover	The ship was driven ashore and wrecked at Norden.
Hoop	Kingdom of Hanover	The ship was driven ashore and wrecked at Norden with the loss of all but one of her crew.
John Woodall	United Kingdom	The ship was driven ashore and wrecked at New York, United States. Her crew were rescued. She was on a voyage from Leone's Island, Patagonia, Argentina to Liverpool.
Juffer Grietje	Elbing	The ship was wrecked on Wangeroog, Kingdom of Hanover. She was on a voyage from Elbing to London, United Kingdom.
Mary Jessie	United Kingdom	The ship was destroyed by fire off Gotland, Sweden. Her crew were rescued.
Nathaniel Thompson	United Kingdom	The ship was driven ashore on the coast of Glamorgan. She was on a voyage from Cardiff, Glamorgan to New Orleans, Louisiana, United States. She was refloated and taken into Newport, Monmouthshire.
Sovereign	United Kingdom	The ship was driven ashore at Fraserburgh, Aberdeenshire. She was refloated on 16 October and found to be hogged on her larboard side.
Venus	United Kingdom	The ship was holed by an anchor and sank at King's Lynn, Norfolk. She was on a voyage from Hartlepool, County Durham to King's Lynn. She was refloated and beached.

== 7 October ==
List of shipwrecks: 7 October 1852
Ship	State	Description
Admiral	(United Kingdom of Great Britain and Ireland) British North America	The steamship was in collision with the steamship Eastern State (United States) and was beached at East Boston, Massachusetts. She was on a voyage from Saint John, New Brunswick to Boston, Massachusetts.
Antares	United Kingdom	The ship was lost near Halifax, Nova Scotia, British North America.
Balgowan	United Kingdom	The sloop was driven ashore and wrecked at Warkworth, Northumberland. Her crew were rescued.
Catherina	Belgium	The ship was lost near Brouwershaven, Zeeland, Netherlands. She was on a voyage from Goole, Yorkshire, United Kingdom to Antwerp.
Charlotte Whitmore	United Kingdom	The ship was lost off Crooked Island, Bahamas. She was on a voyage from St. Jago de Cuba, Cuba to Swansea, Glamorgan.
Emanuel	Hamburg	The ship ran aground between the mouth of the Weser and the Koog. She was on a voyage from Hamburg to London, United Kingdom.
Harriet and Jane	United Kingdom	The schooner ran aground on the Newcombe Sand. She floated off and sank with the loss of four of the twenty people on board. She was on a voyage from Aberdeen to London. Also reported as the brigantine Jane and Harriet.
Minerva	United Kingdom	The brig was abandoned at sea. Her crew survived. She was on a voyage from Sunderland, County Durham to Littlehampton, Sussex.
Rob Roy	United Kingdom	The steamship was driven ashore and wrecked at Warkworth. Her crew were rescued.
Sobraon	United Kingdom	The ship capsized in the Pacific Ocean. Her crew were rescued. She was on a voyage from San Francisco, California, United States to Hong Kong.
Sophie Virginie	(flag) France	The ship sprang a leak and sank off Point d'Ailly. Her crew were rescued. She was on a voyage from Seaham, County Durham, United Kingdom to Caen, Calvados.
Stork	United Kingdom	The ship was driven ashore at "Wangsaastrand", Denmark. She was on a voyage from Dundee, Forfarshire to Riga, Russia. She was refloated on 18 May 1853 and taken into Helsingør, Denmark.
Union	United Kingdom	The ship was driven ashore and wrecked north of Aberavon, Glamorgan.

== 8 October ==
List of shipwrecks: 8 October 1852
Ship	State	Description
Cestus	United Kingdom	The ship was abandoned in the Atlantic Ocean. Her crew were rescued. She was on a voyage from Cape St. John, Newfoundland, British North America to Queenstown, County Cork.
Dolphin	United Kingdom	The sloop was driven ashore 2 nautical miles (3.7 km) east of Lossiemouth, Lothian with the loss of a crew member. She was on a voyage from Kirkwall, Orkney Islands to Dundee, Forfarshire.
Frau Christine	Stralsund	The ship was driven ashore north of Wyk aan Zee, North Holland, Netherlands. Her crew were rescued. She was on a voyage from Stralsund to Poole, Dorset, United Kingdom.
Fury	United Kingdom	The ship ran aground off Kythira, Greece. She was on a voyage from Liverpool, Lancashire to Constantinople, Ottoman Empire.
Great Britain	United Kingdom	The ship foundered in the English Channel off Hythe, Kent. Her crew were rescued.
Gitana	United Kingdom	The barque was wrecked on the Ng-Tiu-Kong, off the coast of Formosa. Her crew were rescued. She was on a voyage from London to Shanghai, China.
Guerrier	France	The sloop was wrecked on Texel, North Holland, Netherlands. Her crew were rescued. She was on a voyage from Saint-Valery-sur-Somme, Somme to Newcastle upon Tyne, Northumberland, United Kingdom.
Margaretha	Hamburg	The ship was driven ashore on Neuwerk. She was on a voyage from Málaga, Spain to Hamburg. She was refloated on 12 October and taken into Cuxhaven in a severely damaged condition.
Meta	Danzig	The ship was wrecked near "Baltic Port". She was on a voyage from Danzig to Saint Petersburg, Russia.
Nelson	United Kingdom	The flat collided with the quayside at Liverpool, drove her anchor through her bow and sank. She was on a voyage from Birkenhead, Cheshire to Liverpool.
Poppy	United Kingdom	The clipper ship was driven ashore and wrecked at Madras, India.
Red Rover	United Kingdom	The steamship was driven ashore and broke in two 2 nautical miles (3.7 km) north of Scheveningen, South Holland, Netherlands. All on board were rescued. She was on a voyage from London to Groningen, Netherlands Red Rover was on her first voyage after being rebuilt from a paddle steamer to a screw steamer.
Rollerson	United States	The ship was destroyed by fire at Savannah, Georgia.
Serene	France	The ship was wrecked near Scheveningen, South Holland, Netherlands with the loss of five of her seven crew. She was on a voyage from Stettin to Cherbourg, Seine-Inférieure.
Starling	United Kingdom	The ship was driven ashore near Huisduinen, North Holland Netherlands. She was on a voyage from Schiedam, South Holland to Sunderland, County Durham.
Struggle	United Kingdom	The schooner was driven ashore and wrecked at Madras.
Successor	United Kingdom	The barque was driven ashore and wrecked at Madras with the loss of 64 lives. She was on a voyage from Madras to Rangoon, Burma.

== 9 October ==
List of shipwrecks: 9 October 1852
Ship	State	Description
Alpha	United Kingdom	The ship ran aground off Dunkirk, Nord, France and was wrecked. Her crew were rescued. She was on a voyage from Stettin to Jersey, Channel Islands.
Amelie	France	The brig departed from Marseille, Bouches-du-Rhône for the Rio Grande. No further trace, presumed foundered with the loss of all hands.
Elizabeth	Flag unknown	The ship was wrecked south of Noordwijk aan Zee, South Holland, Netherlands. Her crew were rescued. She was on a voyage from "Katingasel" to London, United Kingdom.
John Rutledge	United Kingdom	The ship was driven against the quayside and damaged at Charleston, South Carolina, United States.
Jonge Wicher	Netherlands	The ship was driven ashore on Juist, Kingdom of Hanover. Her crew were rescued. She was on a voyage from Amsterdam, North Holland to Stettin.
Lina	Russia	The ship was wrecked at Reval. She was on a voyage from Liepāja to Kronstadt.
Sarah	United Kingdom	The schooner was abandoned and foundered in the Atlantic Ocean. Her crew were rescued. She was on a voyage from Newport, Monmouthshire to Wilmington, North Carolina, United States.
Suomi	Russia	The ship was driven ashore on Terschelling, Friesland, Netherlands. SHe was on a voyage from Kertch to Hull, Yorkshire, United Kingdom.
Vintage	United Kingdom	The schooner was abandoned in the North Sea. Her crew were rescued by August (Hamburg). Vintage was on a voyage from Rotterdam, South Holland, Netherlands to Newcastle upon Tyne, Northumberland. She was discovered derelict 8 nautical miles (15 km) west of Heligoland by the steamship Stoomwaaert (Hamburg). Four hands were put aboard and she was taken into the Elbe, where she arrived the next day.

== 10 October ==
List of shipwrecks: 10 October 1852
Ship	State	Description
Federico III	Kingdom of Sardinia	The ship was driven ashore and wrecked west of Tarifa, Spain with the loss of her captain. She was on a voyage from La Guayra, Venezuela to Genoa.
Foreningen	Flag unknown	The whaler was beached on Heligoland.
Four Brothers	United States	The brig was wrecked on Saint Domingo.
Galleed	Spain	The cutter was driven ashore at "Green Island", Spain. She was refloated.
Gulnare	United Kingdom	The ship was abandoned in the Atlantic Ocean. Her crew were rescued by Clio ( (United Kingdom of Great Britain and Ireland) Jersey). Gulnare was on a voyage from Brăila, Ottoman Empire to Falmouth, Cornwall or Queenstown, County Cork.
Janet Willis	United Kingdom	The barque was abandoned in the Atlantic Ocean (46°01′N 12°39′W). Her crew were rescued by the barque Uruguay (United Kingdom). She was on a voyage from Odesa to a British port.
Madawaska	United Kingdom	The ship was driven ashore and severely damaged at Manasquan, New Jersey, United States. She was on a voyage from Manila, Spanish East Indies to New York, United States. She was refloated on 12 October and taken into New York.
Trial	United Kingdom	The schooner was driven ashore at "Getares". She was refloated and taken into Gibraltar.
Warrior	United Kingdom	The ship ran aground at the mouth of the River Ribble. Her crew were rescued. She was later refloated.
William	(United Kingdom of Great Britain and Ireland) British North America	The ship was wrecked at Richibucto, New Brunswick. Her crew were rescued. She was on a voyage from Liverpool, Lancashire to Richibucto.

== 11 October ==
List of shipwrecks: 11 October 1852
Ship	State	Description
James Fagan	United Kingdom	The ship was abandoned in the Atlantic Ocean. Her crew were rescued by Pyramid (United States). James Fagan was on a voyage from Cádiz, Spain to New York, United States.
Leopold Alfred	France	The ship ran aground and sank off Great Yarmouth, Norfolk, United Kingdom. Her crew were rescued. She was on a voyage from Newcastle upon Tyne, Northumberland, United Kingdom to Bordeaux, Gironde.
Medea	United Kingdom	The ship was abandoned in the North Sea. She was on a voyage from Constantinople, Ottoman Empire to London. She subsequently came ashore at Norden, Kingdom of Hanover.
Rachael	United Kingdom	The collier, a brig, ran aground on the Haisborough Sands, in the North Sea off the coast of Norfolk and sank. Her crew survived. She was on a voyage from Sunderland, County Durham to Ipswich, Suffolk.
Warrior	United Kingdom	The brig ran aground on the Middle Bank, in the Irish Sea off the coast of Lancashire. Her crew were rescued. She was refloated.
Zwantina	Netherlands	The ship was sunk north of Tønning, Duchy of Holstein. She was on a voyage from Rostock to Amsterdam, North Holland.

== 12 October ==
List of shipwrecks: 12 October 1852
Ship	State	Description
Arundel	United Kingdom	The schooner was wrecked on the Monsciar Reef, in the Mediterranean Sea. She was on a voyage from Alexandria, Egypt to Cork or Falmouth, Cornwall.
Enterprise	United Kingdom	The ship ran aground on the Domesnes Reef, in the Baltic Sea. She was on a voyage from Ipswich, Suffolk to Bolderāja, Russian Empire. She was refloated and taken into Bolderāja in a leaky condition.
Hiima	Russia	The barque collided with Prince Hendrik (Netherlands) and sank in the Irish Sea. Her crew were rescued by Prince Hendrik. Hiima was on a voyage from Cádiz, Spain to Helsinki, Grand Duchy of Finland.
Julie Andrea	Sweden	The ship was wrecked on Bornholm, Denmark.
Leith	United Kingdom	The steamship caught fire off Sheerness, Kent. She was on a voyage from London to Grantown-on-Spey, Moray. She was taken into Gravesend, Kent.

== 13 October ==
List of shipwrecks: 13 October 1852
Ship	State	Description
Eliza	United Kingdom	The ship ran aground on the Newcombe Sand, in the North Sea off the coast of Suffolk. She was on a voyage from Cardiff, Glamorgan to Hamburg. She was refloated and towed into Lowestoft, Suffolk in a leaky condition.
Laura Adell	Netherlands	The East Indiaman, a barque, was destroyed by fire in the Atlantic Ocean. All nineteen people on board were rescued by Hibbert (United Kingdom). Laura Adell was on a voyage from Amsterdam, North Holland to Batavia, Netherlands East Indies.
Marie	United Kingdom	The brig foundered in the Atlantic Ocean (46°50′N 11°50′W). Her crew were rescued by William and Mary (United Kingdom). Marie was on a voyage from Galaţi, Ottoman Empire to Cork.

== 14 October ==
List of shipwrecks: 14 October 1852
Ship	State	Description
Calder	United Kingdom	The ship was boarded by a pilot off Barnegat, New Jersey with the intention of putting back to New York, United States. No further trace, presumed foundered with the loss of all on board. She was on a voyage from New York to Liverpool, Lancashire.
Fifeshire	United Kingdom	The ship ran aground on the North Goldstone Bank, in the North Sea off the coast of Northumberland and sank. Her crew were rescued. She was on a voyage from Newcastle upon Tyne, Northumberland to Leith, Lothian.
Independence	United Kingdom	The ship was reported to have been wrecked at Chinchew, China. She was on a voyage from Singapore to Amoy, China. She was refloated and taken into a port where she was repaired. Independence completed her voyage on 14 December
Johanna Maria	Rostock	The ship was wrecked off "Gronritz".
Johnathan Borem	United States	The schooner was run down and sunk in the Hudson River by the steamship Franncis Skiddy (United States) with the loss of all on board.
Lamina	Belgium	The ship was driven ashore near Zoutkamp, Groningen, Netherlands. Her crew were rescued.
Lucknow	United Kingdom	The ship was lost off Pratas Island with the loss of all hands. She was on a voyage from Hong Kong to Amoy, China.
Scarborough	United Kingdom	The brig was abandoned in the Atlantic Ocean. Her crew were rescued. She was on a voyage from New York to London.
Senhora	United Kingdom	The ship was abandoned in the Atlantic Ocean. Her crew were rescued by Cochituate (United States). Senhora was on a voyage from New York to Liverpool, Lancashire.

== 15 October ==
List of shipwrecks: 15 October 1852
Ship	State	Description
Atlanta	United States	The fishing schooner was lost at Souris, Prince Edward Island, Bay of St. Lawrence. Crew saved.
Augusta Parker	United States	The fishing schooner was lost at Souris, Prince Edward Island, Bay of St. Lawrence in a gale. Crew saved.
Chase	United Kingdom	The ship ran aground on the Sandhammer Reef, in the Baltic Sea. She was on a voyage from Kronstadt, Russia to Helsingør, Denmark. She was refloated and taken into Ystad, Sweden.
Columbus	United Kingdom	The ship foundered in the Atlantic Ocean. Her crew were rescued by Witness (United Kingdom). Columbus was on a voyage from Cardiff, Glamorgan to the Cape of Good Hope, Cape Colony.
Hannibal	United States	The fishing schooner was lost at Souris, Prince Edward Island, Bay of St. Lawrence in a gale. Crew saved.
Jantina Anna	United Kingdom	The ship was sighted off Helsingør, Denmark whilst on a voyage from Königsberg, Prussia to Amsterdam, North Holland. No further trace, presumed foundered with the loss of all hands.
Kendal Castle	United Kingdom	The ship ran aground on the Luggas Rock. She was on a voyage from Amlwch, Anglesey to Newcastle upon Tyne, Northumberland. She was refloated and put into Falmouth, Cornwall.
Leader	United States	The fishing schooner was lost at Souris, Prince Edward Island, Bay of St. Lawrence in a gale. Crew saved.
Ocean Star	United States	The fishing schooner was lost at Souris, Prince Edward Island, Bay of St. Lawrence in a gale. Crew saved.
Olive	Denmark	The ship was discovered derelict in the North Sea. She was on a voyage from Saint Thomas, Virgin Islands to Hamburg. She was taken into the Geeste.
Rio Del Norte	United States	The fishing schooner was lost at Souris, Prince Edward Island, Bay of St. Lawrence in a gale. Crew saved.

== 16 October ==
List of shipwrecks: 16 October 1852
Ship	State	Description
Maria Engelina	Kingdom of Hanover	The ship was wrecked on Memmert. Her crew were rescued. She was on a voyage from Danzig to Bordeaux, Gironde, France.
Onderneming	Netherlands	The ship was sighted off Helsingør, Denmark whilst on a voyage from Danzig to Rotterdam, South Holland. No further trace, presumed foundered with the loss of all hands.
Providence	United Kingdom	The ship was sighted in the Øresund whilst on a voyage from Danzig to London. No further trace, presumed foundered with the loss of all hands.
Spes	United Kingdom	The ship capsized at Greenock, Renfrewshire. She was subsequently righted.

== 17 October ==
List of shipwrecks: 17 October 1852
Ship	State	Description
Addolorato	Stettin	The ship ran aground at South Shields, County Durham, United Kingdom. She was on a voyage from Stettin to South Shields. She was refloated.
Ellen	United Kingdom	The ship was wrecked at the mouth of the Roman River, British Honduras.
General Chasse	Netherlands	The barque ran aground and capsized at Cardiff, Glamorgan, United Kingdom. She was on a voyage from Cardiff to San Francisco, California, United States. General Chasse was towed to Penarth, Glamorgan the next day and beached in a severely damaged condition. She was consequently condemned.
Helma	Russia	The barque was in collision with Prince Hendrick (United Kingdom) and sank in the Irish Sea. Her crew were rescued by Prince Hendrick. Helma was on a voyage from Liverpool, Lancashire, United Kingdom to Cádiz, Spain.
Providence	France	The chasse-marée was wrecked west of the Glénan Islands, Finistère. Her crew were rescued.
Robert	United Kingdom	The ship was in collision with Resolution (United Kingdom) and sank off Ramsgate, Kent.
Sabbatis	United Kingdom	The ship was abandoned in the Atlantic Ocean. Her crew were rescued by Ocean Queen (United Kingdom). Sabbatis was on a voyage from Virginia, United States to Liverpool, Lancashire.
Twee Wannar	Sweden	The ship was driven ashore and wrecked at Allinge, Denmark. She was on a voyage from Kalmar to Ystad.

== 18 October ==
List of shipwrecks: 18 October 1852
Ship	State	Description
Busick	United Kingdom	The brig was in collision with the barque Fifeshire and sank in the English Channel 6 nautical miles (11 km) east of St. Anthony's Lighthouse, Cornwall. Her seven crew were rescued by Fifeshire. Busick was on a voyage from Llanelly, Glamorgan to Littlehampton, Sussex.
Georgina	Muscat and Oman	The ship was abandoned whilst on a voyage from Muscat to Calcutta, India. Her crew were rescued.
Graaf von Cæsow	Flag unknown	The ship departed from Newcastle upon Tyne, Northumberland for Smyrna, Ottoman Empire. No further trace, presumed foundered with the loss of all hands.
Jenny	Russia	The ship ran aground and capsized in the River Trent near East Butterwick, Lincolnshire, United Kingdom. Her crew were rescued. She was on a voyage from Gainsborough, Lincolnshire to New Holland, Lincolnshire.
John	United Kingdom	The schooner ran aground on the Holm Sand, in the North Sea off the coast of Suffolk. She was refloated .
Lively	United Kingdom	The ship was driven ashore at Great Yarmouth, Norfolk. She was on a voyage from Whitby, Yorkshire to London. She was refloated the next day and put into Great Yarmouth before resuming her voyage.
Metropolitan	United Kingdom	The steamship collided with the brig Zollvarein ( Danzig) and sank in the English Channel off Beachy Head, Sussex. All 23 people on board were rescued by Zollvarein. Metropolitan was on a voyage from London to Glasgow, Renfrewshire.
Nizam	United Kingdom	The ship ran aground on the Ship Gunge Sand and was wrecked with the loss of two of her crew. She was on a voyage from Calcutta, India to London.

== 19 October ==
List of shipwrecks: 19 October 1852
Ship	State	Description
Balmoral	United Kingdom	The ship was driven ashore and severely damaged at Mille Vaches, Province of Canada, British North America. She was on a voyage from Quebec City, Province of Canada to Limerick. She was refloated on 20 November.
Bosphorus	United Kingdom	The ship struck a sunken rock in the Isles of Scilly. She was on a voyage from Buenos Aires, Argentina to Antwerp, Belgium.
Britannia	United Kingdom	The ship was driven ashore and wrecked near "Baltic Port". She was on a voyage from Saint Petersburg, Russia to Dundee, Forfarshire.
Courier	United Kingdom	The ship departed from Middlesbrough, Yorkshire for Alexandria, Egypt. No further trace, presumed foundered with the loss of all hands.
Henry Wright	United Kingdom	The paddle tug was severely damaged by fire at Constantinople, Ottoman Empire. Subsequently repaired and returned to service.
John Revenal	United Kingdom	The ship ran aground near "Baltic Port. She was on a voyage from Saint Petersburg, Russia to Dundee, Forfarshire.
Lord Melbourne	United Kingdom	The schooner was driven ashore at Cairnbulg, Aberdeenshire. She was refloated the next day.
Nelson	United Kingdom	The ship was driven ashore at Bathurst, New Brunswick, British North America.
Quatre Cousins	France	The ship was driven ashore at Bône, Algeria.
Richard Mount	United Kingdom	The ship was driven ashore at Dungeness, Kent. She was on a voyage from Hamburg to Newfoundland, British North America. She was refloated on 21 October.
St. Antonius	Prussia	The ship was sighted in the Øresund whilst on a voyage from Königsburg to Cowes, Isle of Wight, United Kingdom. No further trace, presumed foundered with the loss of all hands.
St. George d'Elmina	Netherlands	The brig ran aground at New Romney, Kent. She was on a voyage from Rotterdam, South Holland to Africa. She was refloated.
Superb	United Kingdom	The schooner foundered in the Atlantic Ocean. Her crew were rescued the next day by the brig Henry Taylor (United Kingdom). Superb was on a voyage from Newport, Monmouthshire to Alicante, Spain.
Trientje	Netherlands	The ship was driven ashore and wrecked at Karwenbruch, Prussia. Her crew were rescued. She was on a voyage from Elbing to Rotterdam, South Holland.

== 20 October ==
List of shipwrecks: 20 October 1852
Ship	State	Description
Angelo	Austrian Empire	The ship was driven ashore and sank at Bighi, Malta with the loss of ten of her twelve crew. Survivors were rescued by the schooner Northam (United Kingdom). Angelo was on a voyage from Alexandria, Egypt to Liverpool, Lancashire, United Kingdom. She was refloated on 26 November.
Bentinck	United Kingdom	The paddle steamer ran aground 5 nautical miles (9.3 km) off Cowes, Isle of Wight. She was on a voyage from Alexandria, Egypt to Southampton, Hampshire. She was refloated and completed her voyage.
Catherine Hayes	United Kingdom	The schooner was wrecked 2 nautical miles (3.7 km) north of Syracuse, Sicily. Her crew were rescued. She was on a voyage from Catania, Sicily to Belfast, County Antrim.
Constantin	Russia	The ship was driven ashore at Great Yarmouth, Norfolk, United Kingdom. She was on a voyage from Riga to Porto, Portugal. She was refloated but ran aground on the Cross Sand. She was again refloated and taken into Great Yarmouth.
Franzisca	Prussia	The ship was driven ashore and wrecked at Memel. Her crew were rescued. She was on a voyage from Memel to Portsmouth, Hampshire, United Kingdom.
Giacomina	Kingdom of the Two Sicilies	The mistico capsized off Fort Ricasoli, Malta with the loss of six of her eight crew. Survivors were rescued by the schooner Northam (United Kingdom).
Giannina	Malta	The ship was driven ashore and wrecked at Tripoli, Ottoman Tripolitania.
Giannini	Malta	The brig was driven ashore and wrecked at Tajura, Ottoman Tripolitania. All on board were rescued.
Iraclis	Greece	The brig was driven ashore at Malta.
Iris	Malta	The brig was driven ashore and wrecked at Tripoli.
Jane	United Kingdom	The ship was wrecked on Düne, Heligoland.
Mary Tiffin	United Kingdom	The ship was sighted off Helsingør, Denmark whilst on a voyage from Kronstadt, Russia to London. No further trace, presumed foundered with the loss of all hands.
Melziade	Greece	The ship was driven ashore and wrecked at Malta. Her crew were rescued. She was on a voyage from Andros to Marseille, Bouches-du-Rhône, France.
Meshoud	Ottoman Empire	The brig was wrecked at Malta. Her crew were rescued.
Narcissa	Kingdom of the Two Sicilies	The brig was driven ashore and wrecked at Malta. Her crew were rescued. She was on a voyage from Messina to Barletta.
Prosperity	United Kingdom	The brig departed from Arkhangelsk, Russia for London. Presumed subsequently wrecked off Nordkapp, Norway with the loss of all six of her crew. Two wrecked boats and the ship's dog were discovered 12 nautical miles (22 km) west of Nordkapp.
Rudolph	United Kingdom	The ship was wrecked on Neckman's Ground, in the Baltic Sea. Her crew were rescued. She was on a voyage from Liverpool, Lancashire to Reval, Russia.
San Francisco di Paolo	Kingdom of the Two Sicilies	The tartana was driven ashore and wrecked at Malta. Her crew were rescued.
Vesta	United Kingdom	The ship departed from Chaleur Bay for Chester, Cheshire. No further trace, presumed foundered with the loss of all hands.
Zephyr	United Kingdom	The ship was driven ashore and wrecked on Skagen, Denmark. Her crew were rescued. She was on a voyage from Peterhead, Aberdeenshire to Stettin.

== 21 October ==
List of shipwrecks: 21 October 1852
Ship	State	Description
Commodore	United Kingdom	The ship foundered off Constantinople, Ottoman Empire. Her crew were rescued. She was on a voyage from Odesa to a British port.
Hoop	United Kingdom	The ship departed from Constantinople for Falmouth, Cornwall of Queenstown, County Cork. No further trace, presumed foundered with the loss of all hands.
Jenny	United Kingdom	The ship was driven ashore on the Kalkgrund, in the Baltic Sea off Reval, Russia. She was on a voyage from Saint Petersburg, Russia to Kirkcaldy, Fife. She subsequently became a wreck.
Lady Francis	United Kingdom	The ship sprang a leak and sank in the English Channel 20 nautical miles (37 km) south west of St. Catherine's Lighthouse, Isle of Wight. Her crew were rescued. She was on a voyage from Swansea, Glamprgan to London.
Sophie Augustine	France	The ship was driven ashore at Hartlepool, County Durham, United Kingdom She was refloated on 9 November and towed into Hartlepool.

== 22 October ==
List of shipwrecks: 22 October 1852
Ship	State	Description
Acastes	United Kingdom	The ship was driven ashore on Graham's Point, Nova Scotia, British North America. She was on a voyage from Liverpool, Lancashire to Charlottetown, Prince Edward Island, British North America. She had been refloated by 28 October and was subsequently taken into Charlottetown.
Lady Bulmer	United Kingdom	The ship was driven ashore at Flamborough Head, East Riding of Yorkshire. She was refloated.
Progress	United Kingdom	The ship ran aground on Treosten's Reef, off Frederikshavn, Denmark. She was on a voyage from Danzig to London. She was refloated.
St. Joseph	France	The chasse-marée was wrecked at Boscawen, Cornwall, United Kingdom. Her crew were rescued. She was on a voyage from Noirmoutier, Vendée to Swansea, Glamorgan, United Kingdom.

== 23 October ==
List of shipwrecks: 23 October 1852
Ship	State	Description
Caledonia	United Kingdom	The ship collided with Rankin in the Saint Lawrence River and was severely damaged. She was on a voyage from Quebec City, Province of Canada, British North America to Liverpool, Lancashire. She was taken into Petit-Métis, Province of Canada, where she was condemned.
Celeritas	Flag unknown	The ship ran aground on the Oxarne Grunden.
Engelbracht	Sweden	The ship was driven ashore near Kalmar. Her crew were rescued. She was on a voyage from Stockholm to the Duchy of Holstein.
Enterprise	United Kingdom	The ship departed from Cuxhaven for Plymouth, Devon. No further trace, presumed foundered with the loss of all hands.
Harmony	United Kingdom	The ship was driven ashore on "George Island". She was on a voyage from Halifax, Nova Scotia to New York, United States.
Iraclis	Greece	The brig was driven ashore at Malta.
Jonge Barends	Netherlands	The ship was sighted off Helsingør, Denmark whilst on a voyage from Danzig to Amsterdam, North Holland. No further trace, presumed foundered with the loss of all hands.
Langeland	Netherlands	The ship was departed from the Vlie on this date. No further trace, presumed foundered with the loss of all hands.
Mount Vernon	United Kingdom	The ship was wrecked in the Saint Lawrence River.
Précurseur	France	The ship was driven ashore at Havre de Grâce, Seine-Inférieure with the loss of seven of her eight crew. The survivor was rescued by the Havre Lifeboat. She was on a voyage from Cette, Hérault to Rouen, Seine-Inférieure.
Sea King, or Sea Queen	United Kingdom	The ship was driven ashore in the Yangtze Kiang. She was on a voyage from Melbourne, Victoria to Shanghai, China. She was refloated on 26 October and taken into Shanghai.

== 24 October ==
List of shipwrecks: 24 October 1852
Ship	State	Description
Amalia	Sweden	The ship was wrecked on Saaremaa, Russia. She was on a voyage from Riga, Russia to Gothenburg.
Andes	Hamburg	The ship was driven ashore and wrecked on Terschelling, Friesland, Netherlands. Her crew were rescued. She was on a voyage from Bahia, Brazil to Hamburg.
Ann and Eliza	United Kingdom	The ship was wrecked on Saaremaa. She was on a voyage from Riga to London.
Antoinette	(United Kingdom of Great Britain and Ireland) British North America	The brigantine was wrecked at Saint Domingo.
Brothers and Sisters	United Kingdom	The schooner was driven ashore on "Knaabeta", Denmark.
Ellen	United Kingdom	The ship ran aground at Sunderland, County Durham. She was on a voyage from Sierra Leone to Sunderland. She was refloated.
Friendship	United Kingdom	The sloop sprang a leak and sank in the Firth of Forth. Her crew were rescued.
Gepkelma Lucretia	Netherlands	The ship sank off Lokken-Vrå, Denmark. Her crew were rescued. She was on a voyage from Saint Petersburg, Russia to Groningen.
Mary Jones	United Kingdom	The ship was wrecked neare Kuressaare, Russia. She was on a voyage from Riga to Hull, Yorkshire.
Resolution	United Kingdom	The ship sank in the English Channel off Cape Barfleur, Manche, France. Her crew were rescued by Grand Turk (France). Resolution was on a voyage from Cardiff, Glamorgan to Honfleur, Calvados, France.
Suffolk Hero	United Kingdom	The ship ran aground at Killala, County Louth. She was refloated and taken into Ballina, County Mayo, where she arrived the next day.
Thomas	Netherlands	The ship was driven ashore on the west coast of Texel, North Holland. Her crew were rescued. She was on a voyage from Newcastle upon Tyne, Northumberland, United Kingdom to Amsterdam, North Holland. Thomas was subsequently destroyed by fire.

== 25 October ==
List of shipwrecks: 25 October 1852
Ship	State	Description
America	United States	The ship ran aground at Liverpool, Lancashire, United Kingdom. She was on a voyage from New York to Liverpool.
Antoinette	(United Kingdom of Great Britain and Ireland) British North America	The brigantine was wrecked off Saint Domingo. Her crew were rescued.
Arethusa	United Kingdom	The ship was wrecked on Saaremaa, Russia. Her crew were rescued.
Brandon	United Kingdom	The schooner was driven ashore and wrecked 2 nautical miles (3.7 km) east of Dover, Kent. Her five crew were rescued by the Coast Guard. She was on a voyage from Newcastle upon Tyne, Northumberland to Plymouth, Devon. Brandon broke up on 28 October.
Czar Peter	Russia	The ship was wrecked south of Svartklubben, Sweden. She was on a voyage from Kronstadt to Christianstad, Sweden.
Guesen	Denmark	The ship was wrecked on Gotland, Sweden. She was on a voyage from Copenhagen to Uusikaupunki, Grand Duchy of Finland.
Pegno di Amicitia	Flag unknown	The ship was wrecked on the Ooster Sandbank. Her crew were rescued. She was on a voyage from Odesa to Rotterdam, South Holland, Netherlands.
Pyrenees	United Kingdom	The ship foundered in the North Sea. Her crew were rescued. She was on a voyage from "Wyburg" to Hull, Yorkshire. A dog and cat were taken off the wreck on 8 November by Perseverance (United Kingdom).
Talkea	Prussia	The ship was sighted in the Øresund whilst on a voyage from Königsberg to London, United Kingdom. No further trace, presumed foundered with the loss of all hands.
Ulrica	(Russian Empire) Grand Duchy of Finland	The ship was wrecked off Åland.

== 26 October ==
List of shipwrecks: 26 October 1852
Ship	State	Description
Concordia	Norway	The ship was wrecked on "Baakens Strand". Two crew were rescued. She was on a voyage from Odense, Denmark to Moss.
Fidelity	United Kingdom	The brig was wrecked at Dublin. Her crew were rescued by the Coast Guard.
Janes	United Kingdom	The brig was driven ashore on Lemnos, Greece. She was later refloated.
Jeune Ida	Belgium	The ship was driven ashore at Point Jareis, Charente-Maritime, France. She was on a voyage from Bordeaux, Gironde, France to Guadeloupe. She was later refloated and taken into Saint-Martin-de-Ré, Charente-Maritime.
Neptune	United Kingdom	The brig was driven ashore at Landguard Fort, Harwich, Essex. She was on a voyage from South Shields, County Durham to London. She was refloated with the assistance from the smack Wonder (United Kingdom) and taken into Harwich.
Nordstjernen	Norway	The ship was driven ashore at "Lyngsaas". Her crew were rescued. She was on a voyage from Fredericia, Denmark to a Norwegian port.

== 27 October ==
List of shipwrecks: 27 October 1852
Ship	State	Description
Aid	United Kingdom	The ship was driven against the pier and severely damaged at Inverkeithing, Fife.
Aja Trias	Greece	The brig was driven ashore in the Dardanelles.
Alberta Schuringa	Flag unknown	The ship was driven ashore in the Dardanelles. She was refloated with assistance from Brothers (United Kingdom).
Amelia	United Kingdom	The ship ran aground on the Haisborough Sands, in the North Sea off the coast of Norfolk and was abandoned. She was on a voyage from Vila Nova de Portimão, Portugal to Hull, Yorkshire. Amelia was subsequently found to be on fire.
Amelia	(Greece) Royal Hellenic Navy	The corvette was wrecked on Salamis Island with the loss of two lives.
Ann	United Kingdom	The schooner was wrecked on the Skerwether Sands, in the Bristol Channel off the coast of Glamorgan. Her crew survived in the longboat. She was on a voyage from Barrow-in-Furness, Lancashire to Newport, Monmouthshire.
Anna	Austrian Empire	The barque was driven ashore in the Dardanelles. She was refloated on 29 October.
Bridget	United Kingdom	The ship was driven ashore at Dublin. Her crew were rescued. She was on a voyage form Brazil to Liverpool, Lancashire.
Britannia	United Kingdom	The crewless tug was driven against the quayside and sank at Granton, Lothian.
Carl Edvard	Sweden	The ship was wrecked. Her crew were rescued. She was on a voyage from Stockholm to Wismar.
Caroline	Norway	The ship was wrecked near Östergarn, Sweden. She was on a voyage from Kristianstad to Riga, Russia.
Chaptal	French Navy	The corvette was driven ashore and damaged at Piraeus, Greece.
Charlotte	Prussia	The ship was wrecked on Bornholm, Denmark. Her crew were rescued. She was on a voyage from Pillau to Stettin.
Concezione	Malta	The ship was driven ashore in the Dardanelles. She was refloated.
Eclipse	United Kingdom	The schooner was wrecked on Spittal Point, Northumberland. Her four crew were rescued by a coble. She was on a voyage from Arbroath, Forfarshire to Seaham, County Durham or vice versa.
Emblem	United Kingdom	The ship was driven ashore at "Kiopé Bournon", in the Dardanelles. She was refloated on 29 October.
Eolo, and Randers	Greece; Denmark	Eolo was driven into Randers and both vessels went ashore in the Dardanelles. The captain of Randers was killed.
Erbe, or Erme	Spain	The ship sank off Boscastle, Cornwall, United Kingdom with the loss of all eight crew. She was on a voyage from Havana, Cuba to Hamburg.
Erneste	Bremen	The ship was wrecked at Boscastle. She was on a voyage from Cumaná, Venezuela to Bremen.
Ernst Brockelman	Lübeck	The ship was lost off Travemünde. She was on a voyage from Leith, Lothian to Travemünde.
Euphemia	United States	The full-rigged ship ran aground between Port Royal and Kingston, Jamaica. She was on a voyage from Newport, Monmouthshire, United Kingdom to Kingston.
Exhibition	United Kingdom	The ship ran aground on the Newcombe Sand, in the North Sea off the coast of Suffolk. She was on a voyage from Fowey, Cornwall to Hull.
Fancy Lass	United Kingdom	The ship was driven ashore at Whitburn Steel, County Durham with the loss of all six crew. She subsequently broke up.
Fidelity	United Kingdom	The brig was wrecked at Clogherhead, County Louth. Her eight crew were rescued by the Coast Guard. She was on a voyage from Troon, Ayrshire to Dublin.
Friendship	United Kingdom	The ship struck the pier and sank at Sunderland, County Durham. Her crew were rescued by rocket apparatus.
General Murray	United Kingdom	The ship was driven ashore at Ramsgate, Kent. She was refloated the next day and taken into Ramsgate.
George	United Kingdom	The ship was driven ashore at Blyth. Her crew were rescued.
George and William	United Kingdom	The brig was wrecked on the Goodwin Sands, Kent. Her crew were rescued by a Deal boat. A ship's dog, a Newfoundland, was rescued by the Ramsgate Lifeboat. George and William was on a voyage from Quebec City, Province of Canada, British North America to South Shields, County Durham. She was refloated the next day. The tug Sampson (United Kingdom) towed her into Ramsgate, Kent in a derelict condition.
Gertrude	United Kingdom	The ship was driven ashore at Fleetwood, Lancashire.
Henrietta	(United Kingdom of Great Britain and Ireland) New Zealand	The schooner was driven onto rocks while entering the mouth of Wellington Harbour. All hands were saved.
Hyppolite Marie	France	The brig was wrecked on the Herd Sand, in the North Sea off the coast of County Durham. Her crew were rescued by the lifeboat Northumberland (United Kingdom). Hyppolite Marie was on a voyage from Blyth, Northumberland, United Kingdom to Bordeaux, Gironde.
Hoopende Zeeman	Netherlands	The ship was wrecked on the Zanddyk, in the North Sea off the Dutch coast. Her crew were rescued. She was on a voyage from Newcastle upon Tyne, Northumberland to Amsterdam, North Holland.
Hortense Sidone	France	The ship foundered in the North Sea off the coast of County Durham with the loss of all seven or eight hands. She was on a voyage from Sunderland to Nantes, Loire-Inférieure and/or Bordeaux.
Integrity	(United Kingdom of Great Britain and Ireland) British North America	The brig was abandoned in the Atlantic Ocean. She was on a voyage from Savannah, Georgia, United States to Saint John's, Newfoundland.
Integrity	United Kingdom	The ship was abandoned in the Indian Ocean. Her crew were rescued. She was on a voyage from Moulmein, Burma to an English port.
Isa	United Kingdom	The schooner ran aground on the Herd Sand. She was on a voyage from South Shields to Dundee, Forfarshire. She was refloated and beached on the coast of County Durham.
Jessie Stewart	United Kingdom	The ship struck rocks at Annalong, County Down and was damaged. She was on a voyage from Maryport, Cumberland to Belfast, County Antrim. She was taken into Annalong in a waterlogged condition.
Jeune Ida	France	The ship was driven ashore at Point d'Arcais. She was on a voyage from Guadeloupe to Bordeaux, Gironde.
Katherine	United Kingdom	The sloop was driven ashore and wrecked at Granton.
Lively	United Kingdom	The collier, a brig, was wrecked on the Herd Sand. Her crew were rescued by the lifeboat Northumberland (United Kingdom). Lively was on a voyage from Warkworth, Northumberland to London.
Louisa	United Kingdom	The ship was driven ashore 30 nautical miles (56 km) south of Bridlington, Yorkshire. She had broken up by 12 November.
Luna	Flag unknown	The ship ran aground in the Dardanelles.
Margaret	United Kingdom	The barque was driven ashore at Granton. All on board were rescued. She was on a voyage from Aberdeen to Adelaide, South Australia.
Margaret	United Kingdom	The schooner was driven ashore in the Dardanelles.
Marie	Kingdom of Hanover	The galiot foundered 30 nautical miles (56 km) east by north of Hartlepool. Her crew were rescued by the brig Caroline (United Kingdom). Marie was on a voyage from Great Yarmouth, Norfolk to Gardenstown, Aberdeenshire.
Mélancholie	France	The lugger was driven against the pier and wrecked at Sunderland with the loss of all eight crew.
Merchant	United Kingdom	The ship was driven ashore at Bridlington. Her crew were rescued. She was on a voyage from London to Hartlepool. She was refloated on 12 November and towed into Bridlington by the tug Sampson (United Kingdom).
Messager	France	The ship was wrecked off Ramsgate, Kent with the loss of one of her seven crew. Survivors were rescued by the lugger Tartar (United Kingdom). Messager was on a voyage from Sunderland to Redon, Ille-et-Vilaine.
Minos	Greece	The brig was wrecked in Besika Bay.
Napoleon	United Kingdom	The brig was driven against the pier and sank at Sunderland with the loss of five of her six crew. The survivor was rescued by a coble.
Ormsby Hall	United Kingdom	The schooner was wrecked on the Herd Sand. She was on a voyage from London to Seaham, County Durham.
Paulette Marie	France	The ship was wrecked on the Herd Sand. Her crew were rescued.
Pericles	France	The ship was driven ashore and severely damaged at Piraeus. She was refloated with assistance from Pandore (French Navy).
Queen Victoria	United Kingdom	The schooner was driven ashore at Perranporth, Cornwall with the loss of four of her five crew. She was on a voyage from Runcorn, Cheshire to London.
Rebecca Johanna	Hamburg	The ship was driven ashore and severely damaged at Sunderland. Her six crew were rescued. She was on a voyage from Sunderland to Bordeaux.
Richard and William	United Kingdom	The ship was driven ashore 30 nautical miles (56 km) south of Bridlington.
Royalist	United Kingdom	The barque was driven ashore at Granton. All on board were rescued. She was on a voyage from Quebec City to Leith. She was refloated on 29 October and towed into Leith.
Runnymede	United Kingdom	The ship was driven ashore in the Dardanelles. She was on a voyage from Troon, Ayrshire to Galaţi, Ottoman Empire. She was refloated on 29 October.
San Nicolo	Greece	The brig was wrecked in the Dardanelles.
Stevens	United Kingdom	The sloop was driven ashore and wrecked at Saltfleet, Lincolnshire. She was on a voyage from Ipswich, Suffolk to Gainsborough, Lincolnshire.
Success	United Kingdom	The ship was driven ashore and wrecked at Bridlington. Her crew were rescued. She was on a voyage from the River Tees to Rochester, Kent.
Thorn	Sweden	The ship was driven ashore north of Køge, Denmark. Her crew were rescued. She was on a voyage from Ystad to Copenhagen, Denmark.
Twende Venner	Denmark	The ship ran aground on Sandhagen, off Ebeltoft, Denmark. She was on a voyage from Kallundborg to Lübeck.
Union	United Kingdom	The ship was wrecked on the Herd Sand. All on board were rescued by the lifeboat Providence (United Kingdom). Union was on a voyage from South Shields to Wisbech, Cambridgeshire. Either Union or Unity was refloated on 10 November and towed into South Shields for repairs.
Unity	United Kingdom	The ship was wrecked at South Shields. Her crew were rescued by the lifeboat Providence (United Kingdom). She was on a voyage from Hartlepool to Lowestoft, Suffolk. Either Union or Unity was refloated on 10 November and towed into South Shields for repairs.
Velocity	United Kingdom	The brig was driven ashore and wrecked at Porthtowan, Cornwall. Her crew were rescued. She was on a voyage from Waterford to London.
Vesta	Russia	The ship was wrecked on the Bol van Heyst Bank, in the North Sea off the Dutch coast. Her crew were rescued.
Victoria	(Russian Empire) Grand Duchy of Finland	The ship was driven ashore and wrecked at Sand Point, Northumberland. Her crew were rescued by the Blyth Lifeboat. She was on a voyage from Oulu to Grimsby, Lincolnshire.
Wave	United Kingdom	The yacht sank at Granton.

== 28 October ==
List of shipwrecks: 28 October 1852
Ship	State	Description
Acorn	United Kingdom	The schooner capsized in the North Sea off Kelder Steel, Yorkshire with the loss of all hands.
Amulet	United Kingdom	The brig foundered in the North Sea 1 nautical mile (1.9 km) off Seaton Carew, County Durham with the loss of all seven of her crew.
Avon	United Kingdom	The ship was lost off the coast of Yorkshire with the loss of all five crew.
Bewley	United Kingdom	The brig was driven ashore at Hartlepool, County Durham.
Brilliant	United Kingdom	The barque was driven ashore and wrecked at Hartlepool with the loss of a crew member. Survivors were rescued by the Hartlepool Lifeboat. She was on a voyage from Quebec City, Province of Canada, British North America to Stockton-on-Tees and/or Sunderland, County Durham.
Britannia	United Kingdom	The ship was driven ashore at Hartlepool. Her crew were rescued by the Hartlepool Lifeboat. She was refloated on 14 November and taken into Hartlepool.
Carl Gustav	Sweden	The barque was driven ashore crewless and wrecked at "Hartley Hill", Northumberland. All seven or eight crew missing, presumed drowned. She was on a voyage from the River Tyne to Stockholm.
Cherub	United Kingdom	The ship was driven ashore at Hartlepool. Her crew were rescued by the Hartlepool Lifeboat.
Ellegonda Ida	Netherlands	The ship was driven ashore and wrecked on Møn, Denmark. She was on a voyage from Riga, Russia to Amsterdam, North Holland.
Elliott	United Kingdom	The ship was lost off Lindisfarne, Northumberland with the loss of all five crew.
Emulous	United Kingdom	The brig was driven ashore at Hartlepool. Her crew were rescued by the Hartlepool Lifeboat. She was refloated on 12 November and taken into Hartlepool.
Fenwick	United Kingdom	The brig was driven ashore at Hartlepool. Her crew were rescued by the old Hartlepool Lifeboat. She was subsequently refloated and taken into Hartlepool.
Fortuna	Denmark	The galiot was driven ashore and wrecked at Somercotes, Lincolnshire, United Kingdom.
Fredericke	Rostock	The ship was driven ashore at Hartlepool. Her crew were rescued by the Hartlepool Lifeboat.
Friedrich der Grosse	Danzig	The ship was driven ashore and wrecked on Læsø, Denmark with the loss of 21 of her crew. She was on a voyage from Liverpool, Lancashire, United Kingdom to Danzig.
Gipsy	United Kingdom	The brig ran aground on the Scheelhook, off the coast of Zeeland, Netherlands. Her crew survived.
Glory	Denmark	The ship was driven ashore at Hartlepool. Her crew were rescued by the Hartlepool Lifeboat.
Hardwicke	United Kingdom	The ship was driven ashore at Hartlepool. Her crew were rescued by the Hartlepool Lifeboat.
Hylton Castle	United Kingdom	The brig was driven ashore and damaged at Sunderland. Her crew were rescued by rocket apparatus. She was on a voyage from London to Sunderland. She was refloated on 12 November.
John and Amelia	United Kingdom	The ship was wrecked at Sunderland. Her crew were rescued by the Sunderland Lifeboat.
John and Rebecca	United Kingdom	The ship was driven ashore at Sandhale, Lincolnshire. Her crew were rescued. She was on a voyage from London to Hull, Yorkshire.
John and Thomas	United Kingdom	The ship struck the pier, capsized and was damaged at Sunderland. Her crew were rescued by a pilot boat. She was on a voyage from Aberdeen to Sunderland. She was later righted.
John Twizell	United Kingdom	The ship was driven ashore on Steven's Klint. She was on a voyage from Memel, Prussia to Hull. She was refloated on 30 October and taken into Helsingør, Denmark.
Kelloe	United Kingdom	The ship was driven ashore and severely damaged at Hartlepool. Her crew were rescued by the Hartlepool Lifeboat. She was on a voyage from St. Petersburg to London.
Maid	United Kingdom	The sloop sprang a leak and foundered in the Irish Sea 15 nautical miles (28 km) north of the North West Lightship ( Trinity House). Her crew were rescued. She was on a voyage from Creetown, Kirkcudbrightshire to the River Dee.
March	United Kingdom	The sloop sprang a leak and foundered in the Irish Sea off the coast of Kirkcudbrightshire. Her crew were rescued.
Marie Elisabeth	Norway	The ship was wrecked south of South Shields, County Durham with the loss of seven of the fifteen people on board. Two survivors were rescued by the brig Woodbine (United Kingdom) and six by the South Shields Lifeboat. Marie Elisabeth was on a voyage from London to Christiania. The wreck was plundered by the local inhabitants.
Manly	United Kingdom	The schooner was wrecked at North Sunderland, County Durham with the loss of all four crew. She was on a voyage from Berwick upon Tweed, Northumberland to Hull.
Messenger	United Kingdom	The ship struck the pier at Sunderland and consequently sank in dock. Her crew were rescued. She was on a voyage from the River Wear to London.
Naiad	United Kingdom	The schooner was driven ashore at Hartlepool. Her crew were rescued by the Hartlepool Lifeboat.
Northern	United Kingdom	The brig was wrecked on the Longscar Rocks with the loss of two of her nine crew. Survivors were rescued by the Seaton Lifeboat.
Preciosa	United Kingdom	The ship was wrecked on "Nidingen". Her crew were rescued. She was on a voyage from Memel to London. She floated off on 6 November and was wrecked.
Queen Victoria	United Kingdom	The brig sank at Hartlepool with the loss of a crew member.
Rendsburgh Compagnie	(Denmark) Duchy of Schleswig	The ship was driven ashore at Hartlepool. She was refloated on 14 November and taken into Hartlepool. She was refloated on 12 November and taken into Hartlepool.
Rifleman	United Kingdom	The ship was driven ashore at Hartlepool. Her crew were rescued by the Hartlepool Lifeboat.
Sarah	United Kingdom	The ship was driven ashore at Hartlepool. Her crew were rescued by the Hartlepool Lifeboat.
Seelust	Danzig	The ship was driven ashore and sank at Arendal, Norway. Her crew were rescued. She was on a voyage from Antwerp, Belgium to Danzig.
Sophia Augustine	France	The ship was driven ashore at Hartlepool. Her crew were rescued by the Hartlepool Lifeboat.
St. Hilda	United Kingdom	The collier, a brig, foundered in the North Sea off Hartlepool with the loss of all nine crew.
Thomas Clarkson	United Kingdom	The sloop was wrecked at Sunderland. Her crew were rescued by rocket apparatus.
Victoria	United Kingdom	The ship was driven ashore at North Shields. Her crew were rescued.
Virginia	Sweden	The ship was driven ashore in Ullo Sound. She was on a voyage from London to Gothenburg. She was refloated on 3 November and taken into Christiansand, Norway in a leaky condition.
Volante	United Kingdom	The ship was driven ashore at Hartlepool. Her crew were rescued by the Hartlepool Lifeboat. She was refloated on 11 November and taken into Hartlepool.
Wensleydale	United Kingdom	The brig was wrecked on the Longscar Rocks with the loss of eight of her ten crew. Survivors were rescued by the Seaton Lifeboat. She was on a voyage from South Shields to London.
William	United Kingdom	The ship was driven ashore at Sunderland. Her crew were rescued.
William	United Kingdom	The ship was driven ashore and wrecked on Fårö, Sweden. Her crew were rescued. She was on a voyage from "Wyborg" to an English port.
Zeelust	Belgium	The ship was driven ashore and wrecked at Arendal, Norway. Her crew were rescued. She was on a voyage from Antwerp to Danzig.
Zenobia	Indian Navy	The paddle frigate ran aground in the Hooghly River. She was on a voyage from Martaban, Burma to Calcutta. She was refloated and completed her voyage.
Brouwershaven Lifeboat	Netherlands	The lifeboat capsized whilst going to the aid of a Spanish brig with the loss of all ten crew.

== 29 October ==
List of shipwrecks: 29 October 1852
Ship	State	Description
Ann and Mary	United Kingdom	The ship was driven ashore at Wexford.
Ann Renison	United Kingdom	The ship was wrecked on the Shereweather Sands, in the Bristol Channel off the coast of Glamorgan. Her crew were rescued. She was on a voyage from Barrow-in-Furness, Lancashire to Newport, Monmouthshire.
Concord	Sweden	The ship was abandoned in the Dogger Bank with the loss of five of her seven crew. Survivors were rescued by Neptunus (Norway). She was on a voyage from Sundsvall to Rye, Sussex, United Kingdom.
Cygnet	United Kingdom	The ship ran aground off Lowestoft, Suffolk. She was on a voyage from Blyth, Northumberland to London. She was refloated and towed into Lowestoft.
Economy	United Kingdom	The brig was driven ashore at Warkworth, Northumberland. Her crew were rescued. She was on a voyage from Le Tréport, Seine-Inférieure, France to Seaham. She was refloated on 20 November and taken in tow for Blyth.
Fortuna	Duchy of Holstein	The brig was discovered derelict off Flamborough Head, Yorkshire, United Kingdom. She was towed into Scarborough, Scarborough.
Franiska	Prussia	The ship was driven ashore and wrecked at Memel. She was on a voyage from Memel to Portsmouth, Hampshire, United Kingdom.
Gute Hoffnung	Kingdom of Hanover	The ship was wrecked at Råberg Mile, Denmark. Her crew were rescued. She was on a voyage from Papenburg to a Norwegian port.
Hannah	United Kingdom	The brig was wrecked at Camden Fort Meagher, County Cork. She was on a voyage from Brăila, Ottoman Empire to Newry, County Antrim. She was refloated on 2 November and beached at Queenstown, County Cork.
Hannah	United Kingdom	The brig was abandoned in the North Sea. Her crew were rescued by the sloop Diana (Denmark). Hannah was on a voyage from South Shields, County Durham to Hamburg.
Hawk	United Kingdom	The ship was lost off St. Govan's Head, Pembrokeshire. Her crew were rescued. She was on a voyage from Saundersfoot, Pembrokeshire to Penzance, Cornwall.
John and Rebecca	United Kingdom	The Yorkshire billyboy was driven ashore at Sandhale, Lincolnshire. She was on a voyage from London to Hull, Yorkshire.
Julie	Prussia	The ship was driven ashore at Kiel. She was on a voyage from Saint Petersburg, Russia to Kiel. She was refloated and taken into Kiel.
Kent	United Kingdom	The schooner ran aground on the Bahama Bank, in the Irish Sea and sank.
Londe	Flag unknown	The brig was wrecked on the North Gar, off the mouth of the River Tees. Her ten crew were rescued by Contractor (United Kingdom) and the Redcar and Seaton Lifeboats.
Louisa	Stettin	The ship was wrecked at the mouth of the River Tees. Her crew were rescued by the paddle tug Contractor (United Kingdom).
Magneten	Norway	The ship capsized before 22 October. She was on a voyage from Riga, Russia to Stavanger.
Maria Gustava	Stralsund	The schooner was driven ashore and wrecked on the Bondicar Rocks, off Amble, Northumberland. Her crew were rescued. She was on a voyage from Stralsund to Leith, Lothian, United Kingdom.
Marie	Prussia	The ship struck a capsized ship off Bornholm, Denmark and was abandoned. She was on a voyage from Riga to London.
Ranger	United Kingdom	The schooner was wrecked at Filey, Yorkshire.
Richard and William, or William and Richard	United Kingdom	The ship was driven ashore at Owthorne, Yorkshire. She was refloated on 27 November and taken into Bridlington.
Sceptre	United Kingdom	The ship was driven ashore at Garton, Yorkshire.
Twende Venna	Denmark	The ship was driven ashore and wrecked. Her crew were rescued. She was on a voyage from Aalborg to Lübeck.

== 30 October ==
List of shipwrecks: 30 October 1852
Ship	State	Description
Ann and Mary, or Mary Ann	United Kingdom	The ship ran aground off the Sappen. She was on a voyage from Kronstadt, Russia to London.
Antelope	United Kingdom	The ship was driven ashore at Ringsend Point, County Dublin.
Anna Maria	United Kingdom	The ship was wrecked on Tenedos, Ottoman Empire.
Barbara	Sweden	The ship was lost on the Dogger Bank. Her crew were rescued. SHe was on a voyage from Stockholm to Vlaardingen, South Holland.
Bon Accord	United Kingdom	The brig was abandoned in the North Sea 70 nautical miles (130 km) south south east of Inchcape. Her crew were rescued. She was on a voyage from Wisbech, Cambridgeshire to a Baltic port.
Christiania	United Kingdom	The ship was driven ashore at Hayle, Cornwall. She was refloated on 9 November.
Cygnet	United Kingdom	The brig ran aground off Lowestoft, Suffolk. She was on a voyage from London to Blyth, Northumberland. She was refloated and assisted into Lowestoft.
Exchange	Sweden	The ship was driven ashore 30 nautical miles (56 km) south of Memel, Prussia. Her crew were rescued.
Fancy	United Kingdom	The ship was run into by Reform United Kingdom and sank at Milford Haven, Pembrokeshire. Her crew were rescued.
Hawk	United Kingdom	The ship was abandoned off St. Govan's Head, Cornwall. She was on a voyage from Milford Haven to a Cornish port.
Henrietta	United States	The brig was wrecked in the Bay of Neson. Her crew were rescued.
Hillegunda Ida	Flag unknown	The ship was driven ashore and wrecked between Dragør and Kastrup, Denmark. She was on a voyage from Riga, Russia to Saint-Malo, Ille-et-Vilaine, France.
Johann	Kingdom of Hanover	The ship was abandoned in the North Sea. She was on a voyage from Liverpool, Lancashire, United Kingdom to Königsberg, Prussia.
Maria Anna	Denmark	The ship was driven ashore at Gothem, Sweden. Her crew were rescued. She was on a voyage from Kronstadt to Helsingør.
Mary Miller	United Kingdom	The ship was driven ashore at Lispatrick, County Mayo. She was on a voyage from Drogheda, County Louth to Queenstown, County Cork. She was later refloated and towed into Queenstown.
Ricnard and Anne	United Kingdom	The ship was abandoned in the Atlantic Ocean. Her crew were rescued by Derwent (United Kingdom).
Rosebud	United Kingdom	The ship was driven ashore and wrecked at Copenhagen, Denmar.
Sceptre	United Kingdom	The ship was driven ashore at "Galton", Yorkshire.
Vereningung	Duchy of Holstein	The ship was destroyed by fire at Horsens, Denmark. She was on a voyage from Flensburg to Aarhus, Denmark.
Whim	United Kingdom	The ship was abandoned off Mizen Head, County Cork. She was on a voyage from Ayr to Cardiff, Glamorgan.

== 31 October ==
List of shipwrecks: 31 October 1852
Ship	State	Description
Neptunus	Russia	The ship was abandoned at sea. Her crew were rescued by Bengal (United Kingdom). Neptunus was on a voyage from Riga to Antwerp, Belgium.
Recovery	United Kingdom	The barque was discovered derelict in the North Sea 20 nautical miles (37 km) off the coast of County Durham. She was towed in the South Shields by the brig Jane (United Kingdom).

== Unknown date ==
List of shipwrecks: Unknown date in October 1852
Ship	State	Description
Achilles	United Kingdom	The ship was driven ashore at Copenhagen, Denmark. She was on a voyage from Danzig to Waterford. She was refloated on 30 October.
Æolus	United Kingdom	The ship was wrecked a league (3 nautical miles (5.6 km) west of Casablanca, Morocco before 22 October with the loss of two of her crew. She was on a voyage from Cardiff, Glamorgan to Valparaíso, Chile.
Anna Pauline	Flag unknown	The ship was driven ashore at Heiligenhafen, Duchy of Schleswig. She was refloated on 31 October and taken into Heiligenhafen.
Anne Christine	Norway	The ship was discovered derelict and taken into Lemvik.
Aranco	Chile	The steamship ran aground in Talcahuano Bay. All on board were rescued. She was on a voyage from Valparaíso to Valdivia.
Calla	(United Kingdom of Great Britain and Ireland) British North America	The ship capsized in the Atlantic Ocean before 25 October.
Caroline	Norway	The ship was discovered derelict in the North Sea before 12 October. She was taken into Texel, North Holland, Netherlands.
Concordia	Flag unknown	The ship was lost off Sylt, Duchy of Holstein before 18 October.
Corinth	United States	The ship was lost whilst on a voyage from Richibucto, New Brunswick, British North America to an English port.
Crisis	United Kingdom	The ship was wrecked at Talcahuano, Chile before 1 November. Her crew were rescued. She was on a voyage from Valparaíso to an English port.
Duke of Wellington	United Kingdom	The barque was wrecked on the Cruz del Padre, off Cardenas, Cuba before 8 October.
Edward	(United Kingdom of Great Britain and Ireland) Isle of Man	The sloop was in collision with another vessel and was abandoned before 20 October.
Elizabeth	United Kingdom	The schooner was driven ashore at Kronstadt, Russia before 29 October. She was refloated and taken into Kronstadt.
Elizabeth Anna	Prussia	The brig was abandoned in the North Sea before 29 October. She was on a voyage from Riga, Russia to Antwerp, Belgium.
Eliza Stone	United Kingdom	The ship foundered in the North Sea in late October.
Engelina	Netherlands	The ship departed from Newcastle upon Tyne, Northumberland, United Kingdom for Delfzijl, Groningen before 23 October. No further trace, presumed foundered with the loss of all hands.
England	United Kingdom	The ship sprang a leak and was beached in the Gulf of Tunis before 25 October. Her crew were rescued. She subsequently became a wreck. England was on a voyage from Odesa to Falmouth, Cornwall or Queenstown, County Cork.
Eugen	Prussia	The ship was driven ashore at Memel before 4 October. She was refloated on 5 October.
Fru Lena	Sweden	The ship ran aground on Møn, Denmark. She was on a voyage from Hudiksvall to Hull, East Riding of Yorkshire, United Kingdom. She was refloated and taken into Copenhagen, Denmark in a leaky condition.
General Chasse	France	The ship was beached at Penarth, Glamorgan, United Kingdom on or before 18 October.
George Washington	Norway	The schooner was abandoned in the North Sea 30 nautical miles (56 km) off the Dutch coast before 15 October. Her crew were rescued by Troika (Russia). George Washington was on a voyage from Norway to Harlingen, Friesland, Netherlands.
Heilina	Bremen	The ship was abandoned in the North Sea before 21 October. Her crew were rescued by the koff Three Gebroeders (Kingdom of Hanover). Heilina was on a voyage from Hull to Bremen.
Heiling	Netherlands	The ship was wrecked on Texel, North Holland. Her crew were rescued. She was on a voyage from Groningen to London, United Kingdom.
Jeune Louis	France	The ship was driven ashore on the coast of Kent, United Kingdom. She was refloated and taken into Ramsgate, Kent, where she arrived on 6 October.
John Gerard	United States	The fishing schooner was lost in the Bay of St. Lawrence. Crew saved.
Liberty and Property	United Kingdom	The ship was driven ashore on the Grundkullam, in the Baltic Sea before 8 October. She was on a voyage from Umeå, Sweden to Hull. She was refloated and taken into "Kullboda", Sweden in a leaky condition.
Madawaska	United States	The ship was driven ashore and severely damaged at Manasquan, New Jersey. She was on a voyage from Manila, Spanish East Indies to New York. She was refloated and taken into New York, where she arrived on 26 October.
Maria	United Kingdom	The sloop foundered in the Irish Sea off Great Orme Head, Caernarfonshire on or before 4 October.
Maria	Belgium	The ship was lost in the Dardanelles before 30 October with the loss of all but one of her crew.
Marie	Rostock	The ship foundered in the North Sea. A message in a bottle washed up at Vierhuizen, Friesland, Netherlands on 8 October.
Mary	United Kingdom	The ship departed from Peterhead, Aberdeenshire for Bristol, Gloucestershire. Presumed subsequently foundered with the loss of all hands.
Mary Somerville	United Kingdom	The ship departed from Saint Helena for Liverpool. Presumed subsequently foundered with the loss of all hands, a chest from the ship washed up at Saint Michael's Mount, Cornwall on 11 January 1853.
Mayflower	United Kingdom	The brig was driven ashore and wrecked at "Kivek", Sweden. She was on a voyage from Memel to Hull.
Medea	Denmark	The ship was abandoned off Borkum, Kingdom of Hanover before 10 October. She was then driven ashore in the Hommegat before 15 October. She was on a voyage from Christianstad to London, United Kingdom. Medea was refloated and taken in Emden, Kingdom of Hanover in a wrecked condition.
Minnet	Sweden	The ship was wrecked near Saint Petersburg, Russia. She was on a voyage from Christianstad to Saint Petersburg.
Norden	Sweden	The ship was wrecked at Slitohamn. She was on a voyage from Slitohamn to Malmö.
Ophir	flag unknown	The ship was driven ashore whilst on a voyage from Saint Petersburg to New York. She was refloated and put into Copenhagen, Denmark, where she arrived on 29 October in a leaky condition.
Oscar	Stettin	The ship foundered in the Kattegat. Her captain was rescued by the steamship Nordcup (Denmark).
Re Davide	France	The ship was driven ashore at "Natika". She was refloated and taken into Syra, Greece.
Sceptre	United Kingdom	The ship was lost at Split Point, Newfoundland, British North America before 5 October. She was on a voyage from Port Wallace, Nova Scotia, British North America to Berwick-upon-Tweed, Northumberland.
Sea Mew	United States	The brig was wrecked in Yof Bay before 18 October. Her crew survived.
Sieben Sodskende	Denmark	The ship was in collision with another vessel and was abandoned in the North Sea. Her crew were rescued. She was on a voyage from Helsingør to Havre de Grâce, Seine-Inférieure, France.
Sirene	France	The ship was wrecked north of Scheveningen with the loss of all but two of her crew. She was on a voyage from Cherbourg, Seine-Inférieure to Stettin.
Sisters	United Kingdom	The ship was abandoned in the North Sea off Mappleton, Yorkshire. She was taken into Bridlington, Yorkshire on 27 October.
Soeridderen	(Russian Empire) Grand Duchy of Finland	The ship was driven ashore before 9 October. She was on a voyage from Sundsvall, Sweden to London. She was refloated and taken into Turku.
Sophia	Grand Duchy of Mecklenburg-Schwerin	The ship sank off Gjedser, Denmark with the loss of at least two lives.
Swanetta Gerhardina	Netherlands	The ship was wrecked near "Aargah". Her crew were rescued. She was on a voyage from Dublin, United Kingdom to Danzig.
Thomas Hoult	United Kingdom	The ship foundered in the North Sea before 11 October. Her crew were rescued. She was on a voyage from Seaham, County Durham to Swinemünde, Prussia.
Thomas Maine	United Kingdom	The ship was abandoned in the North Sea before 31 October.
Troubador	Bremen	The ship was driven ashore on Saaremaa, Russia before 8 October. She was on a voyage from Bremen to Kronstadt.
Vernal	(United Kingdom of Great Britain and Ireland) British North America	The ship was abandoned before 27 October. Her crew were rescued.
Warblington	United Kingdom	The ship was wrecked on Ytterholmen, Sweden. She was on a voyage from Kronstadt, Russia to London.
Zeigeist	Danzig	The ship was wrecked south of "Sœby" before 29 October. She was on a voyage from Danzig to Liverpool.
