= List of airlines of Senegal =

This is a list of airlines currently operating in Senegal.

Airline	Image	IATA	ICAO	Callsign	Commenced operations	Ref.
Air Senegal		HC	SZN	SENSA	2018 (Successor to Senegal Airlines)	
Arc en Ciel Airlines			JMS		1996	
Transair (Senegal)		R2	GTS	TRANSGROUP	2010	
Turbot Air Cargo			TAC	TURBOT	2003	

== See also ==
- List of airlines
- List of defunct airlines of Senegal
