= Yoff =

- Town
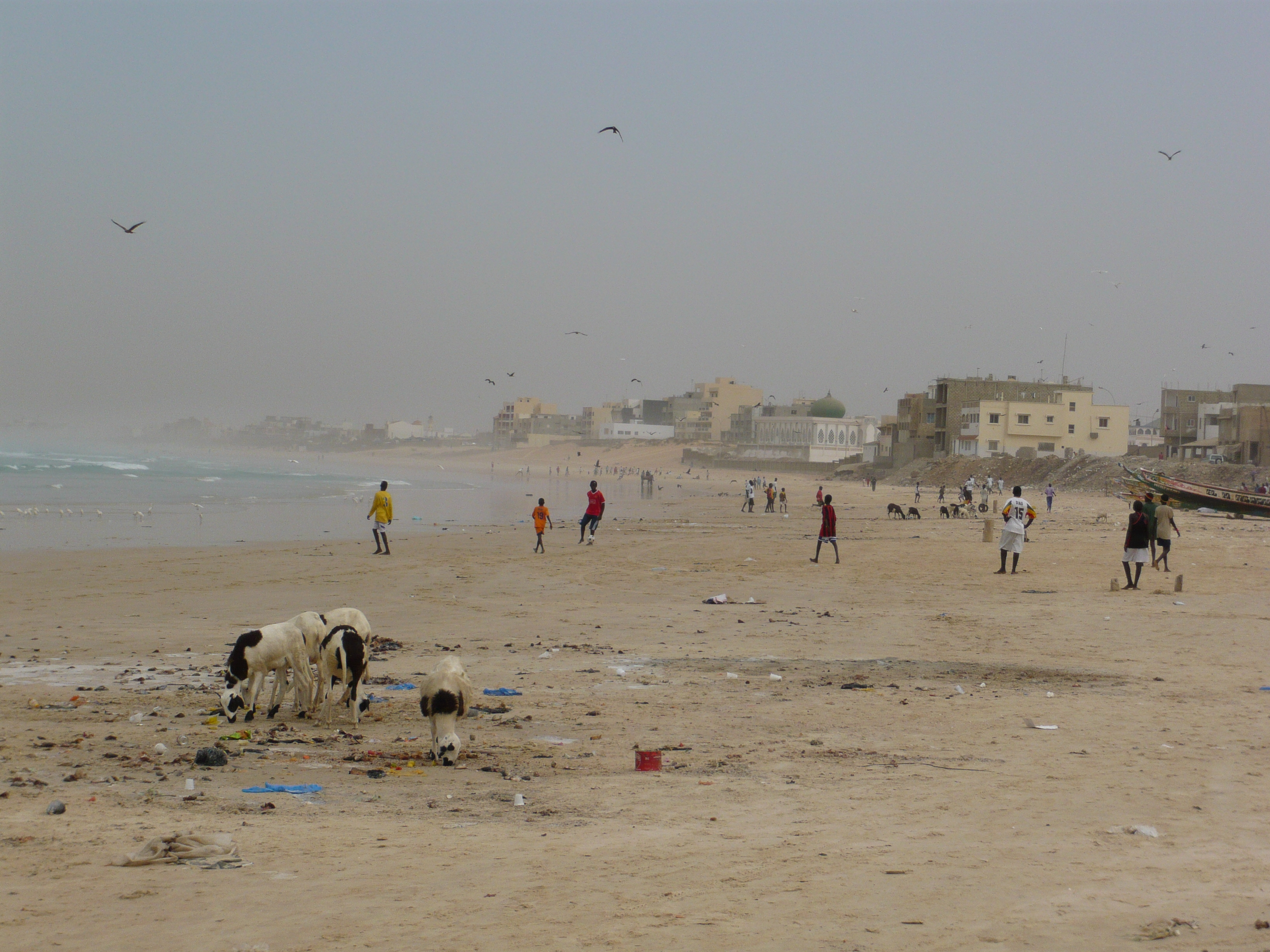
- The beach in Yoff

- Yoff location
- Coordinates: 14°46′N 17°28′W
- Country: Senegal
- Region: Dakar Region

Area
  - Total: 15 km^{2} (5.8 sq mi)

Population (2013)
  - Total: 89,442
  - Density: 6,000/km^{2} (15,000/sq mi)
- Time zone: UTC+0 (GMT)

Yoff (Wolof: Yoof; French: Yoff) is a town (commune d'arrondissement), part of the city (commune) of Dakar, located in Senegal. It lies north of downtown Dakar and immediately north of Léopold Sédar Senghor International Airport. The town is built along the broad beach at Yoff Bay. According to the 2014 census, the population of Yoff is 89,442 inhabitants. Yoff is one of the four original Lebou villages of the Cap-Vert Peninsula, along with Hann, Ngor, and Ouakam.

== History ==
Originally Yoff was a small fishing village, being founded in 1432 as Mbohehe.

== Overview ==
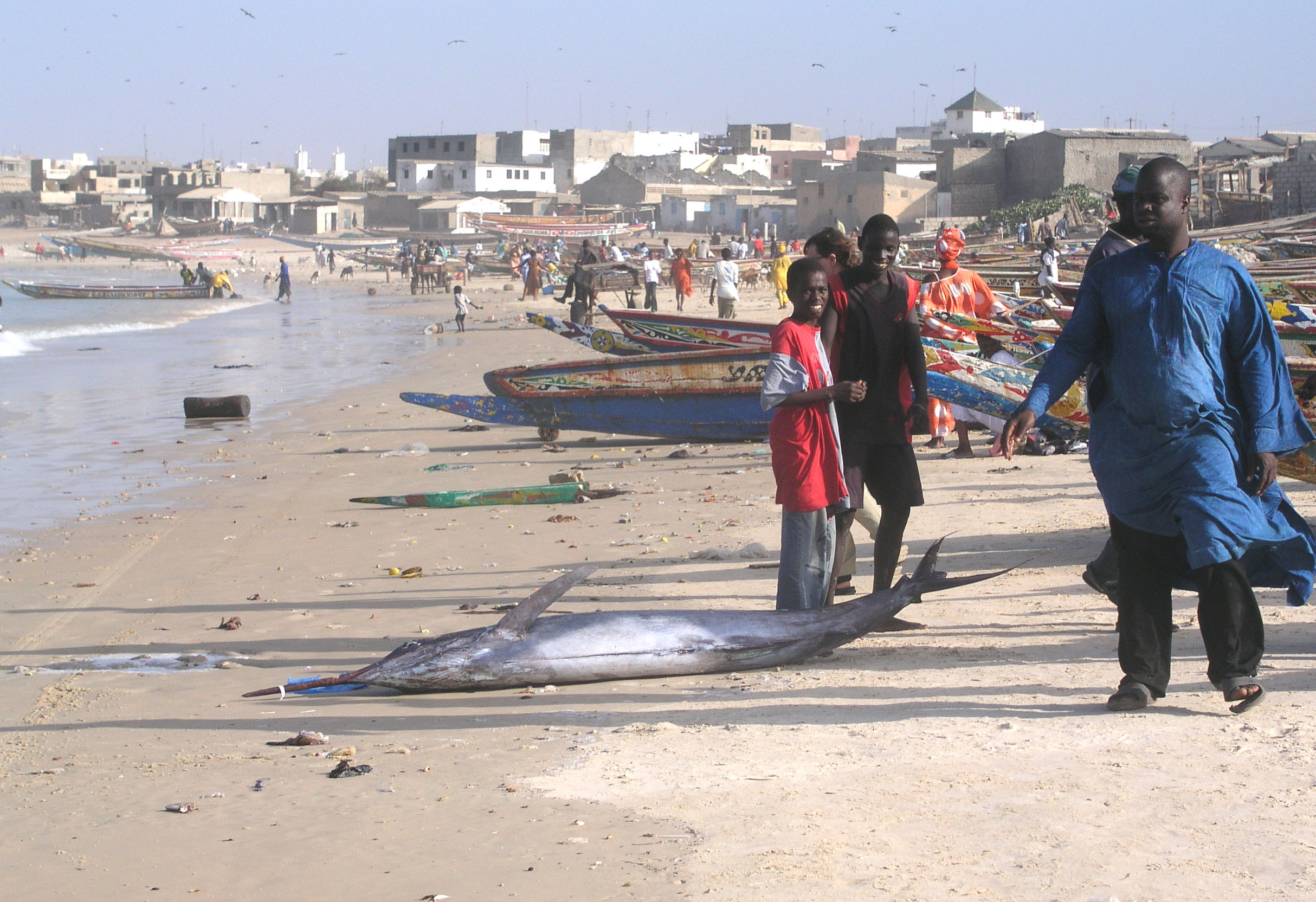

Administration is devolved to the town, which is essentially run by the Layene Islamic Brotherhood, the town featuring the mausoleum of its founder. As a result, no alcohol is available in the town. Fishing is an important local industry, as are the Lebou ndeup healing ceremonies (see Saltigue). There are numerous construction-industry businesses and suppliers in the Yoff area, and it includes the largest Muslim cemetery serving greater Dakar.

Senegal Airlines has its head office on the airport property. At one time Air Sénégal International had its head office on the grounds of the airport.
