= Agence Nationale de l'Aviation Civile et de la Météorologie (Senegal) =

Senegalese civil aviation authority and meteorology agency

Agence Nationale de l'Aviation Civile et de la Météorologie (ANACIM), in English the National Agency of Civil Aviation and Meteorology, is the national civil aviation authority and meteorology agency of Senegal, with its head office on the property of Léopold Sédar Senghor International Airport in Dakar.

ANACIM was formed after two agencies, the Agence Nationale de l'Aviation Civile du Sénégal (ANACS; English: National Civil Aviation Agency of Senegal), and the country's national meteorology agency merged as part of decree 2011-1055 of 28 July 2011.

Previously Service Enquête et Analyse (English Inquiry and Analysis Service) of the ANACIM, formerly a part of ANACS, investigated aviation accidents and incidents. It is now a separate agency, Bureau d'Enquêtes et d'Analyses pour la Sécurité de l'Aviation Civile (BEA Senegal).
