= Med Airlines =

IATA	ICAO	Call sign
M8	—	—
- Founded: 1997
- Commenced operations: 1997
- Ceased operations: 2001
- Hubs: Trapani
- Alliance: Meridiana
- Fleet size: 3
- Headquarters: Trapani
- Key people: Franco Castiglione, President Giuseppe Belloni, Chief Executive Officer Paolo Rizzi, Director of Operations
- Website: www.medairlines.it

Med Airlines is an defunct regional airline based in Italy. In particular it dedicated itself to air connections to and from Sicily from 1997 to 2001.

== History ==
Med Airlines-Linee Aeree del Mediterraneo was founded on 14 February 1997, in Trapani by industrialist Francesco Castiglione and Sicilian businessmen. The staff included several officials previously with Air Sicilia. The goal was to establish permanent and comprehensive scheduled and charter flights from Trapani's Birgi airport. Parma's "Giuseppe Verdi" airport was also on the agenda, filling the gap left by other carriers. The first flights were carried out in the following October with a chartered ATR 42 flying the Parma-Rome-Palermo route and then from Palermo to the islands of Lampedusa and Pantelleria, off the coast of Sicily.

In January 1998, Med received its first Saab 2000, the first Italian airline to operate this fast, Swedish-built turboprop twin-engine aircraft. It was equipped with a 53-seat accommodation. From 1 April 1998, it began scheduled flights from Palermo and Trapani to Florence, Genoa, Lampedusa, Parma, and Rome, and then from Genoa to Bari and Rome. A second aircraft was delivered in June, expanding the network and also operating charter flights. A third Saab 2000 was delivered in August 1999, and in September, a collaboration agreement was signed with Meridiana to operate code-shared flights, starting with the Florence-Palermo route.

Despite the promising prospects and the use of a fast and efficient aircraft, overall traffic performance was below expectations. This was compounded by financial problems due to the loss of interest from investors who had supported the initiative. The year 2000 was marked by uncertainty, and Med Airlines ceased operations in January 2001 and filed for bankruptcy the following month.
