= Senegal Airlines =

National airline of Senegal (2009–2016)

IATA	ICAO	Call sign
DN	SGG	SENEGAL AIR
- Founded: 2009
- Ceased operations: 12 April 2016
- Hubs: Léopold Sédar Senghor International Airport
- Parent company: Groupement National des Privés du Sénégal, Groupements de Prestataires Aéroportuaires, Fédération des Assureurs du Sénégal (64%); Senegalese Government (36%)
- Headquarters: Yoff, Dakar, Senegal
- Key people: Edgardo Badiali (CEO)

Groupe Air Sénégal, operating as Senegal Airlines (French: Sénégal Compagnies Aériennes), was an airline with its head office on the property of Léopold Sédar Senghor International Airport in Dakar, Senegal. It operated a scheduled network in Senegal and neighbouring countries from its main base at Léopold Sédar Senghor International Airport.

== History ==
The airline was launched after Air Sénégal International ceased its operations in 2009, and made its first flights on 25 January 2011. Senegal Airlines's CEO was Edgardo Badiali, the former CEO of GoAir and MyAir. It was 64% privately owned.

On 12 April 2016, Senegal's Minister of Economy, Finance and Planning, Amadou Ba, announced that Senegal Airlines had formally ceased all operations. Senegal Airlines was shut down because it had accumulated over 100 billion CFA francs ($172 million US dollars) of debt since its inception. Senegal plans to establish a new flag carrier in the near future.

On 14 May 2018, Air Senegal was launched to replace it.

== Destinations ==
Senegal Airlines offered service to the following African cities before ceasing operations in April 2016:

=== Europe ===
- France
  - Paris - Charles De Gaulle Airport

=== Africa ===
- Benin
  - Cotonou - Cotonou Airport
- Burkina Faso
  - Ouagadougou - Ouagadougou Airport
- Cameroon
  - Douala - Douala Airport
- Cape Verde
  - Praia - Praia Airport
- Ivory Coast
  - Abidjan - Port Bouet Airport
- Gabon
  - Libreville - Libreville International Airport
- Gambia
  - Banjul - Banjul International Airport
- Guinea
  - Conakry - Gbessia Airport
- Guinea-Bissau
  - Bissau - Osvaldo Vieira International Airport
- Mali
  - Bamako - Senou International Airport
- Mauritania
  - Nouakchott - Nouakchott International Airport
- Niger
  - Niamey - Niamey Airport
- Senegal
  - Cap Skirring - Cap Skirring Airport
  - Dakar - Léopold Sédar Senghor International Airport Hub
  - Ziguinchor - Ziguinchor Airport

== Fleet ==
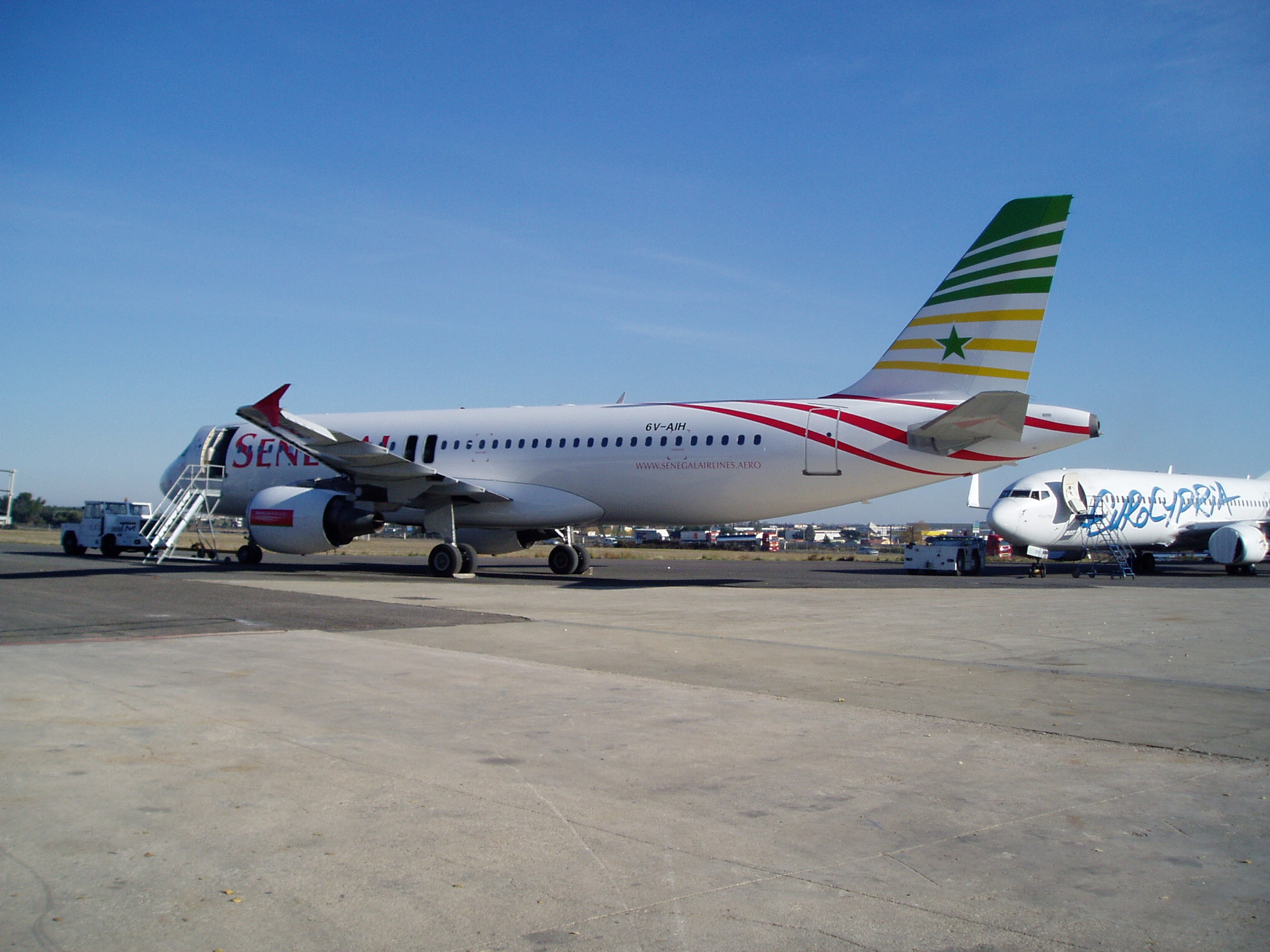
A Senegal Airlines Airbus A320-200 in 2010

Senegal Airlines operated the following aircraft until operations terminated in April 2016:

Sénégal Airlines
Aircraft	In fleet	Passengers	Notes
Airbus A320-200	2	164	
Bombardier Q400	2	74	
Total	4		
