= Yof Bay =

Bay in Dakar, Senegal

Yoff Bay
- Baie de Yof (French)
- Location in Senegal
- Coordinates: 14°46′N 17°28′W
- Ocean/sea sources: Atlantic Ocean
- Basin countries: Senegal
- Max. length: 22 km (14 mi)
- Max. width: 29 km (18 mi)
- Islands: Île de Yoff
- Settlements: Yoff

Yof Bay (French: Baie de Yoff) is a bay on the north side of the Cap-Vert peninsula, directly north of the city centre of Dakar, Senegal. It stretches southwest from the town Kayar to Yoff, a suburb of Dakar. The bay opens towards the north and lies in the area of the westernmost point of Africa. Small Île de Yoff lies in the NW corner of the bay.
