= Saint-Louis Airport =

Commercial airport serving Saint-Louis, Senegal

Saint-Louis Airport Aéroport de Saint-Louis
- IATA: XLS; ICAO: GOSS

Summary
- Airport type: Public
- Serves: Saint-Louis, Senegal
- Elevation AMSL: 9 ft (2.7 m)
- Coordinates: 16°03′03″N 016°27′47″W

Map
- Location within Senegal

Runways
Direction	Length		Surface
Direction	m	ft	Surface
18/36	1,900	6,234	Asphalt
- Source: DAFIF

Saint-Louis Airport (French: Aéroport de Saint-Louis) (IATA: XLS, ICAO: GOSS) is an airport serving Saint-Louis, the capital of the Saint-Louis Region in Senegal. Saint-Louis is located near the Senegal River, and served as Senegal's capital until independence in 1960. It is 320 km (199 mi) north of Senegal's current capital in Dakar.

By 1985 the original grass/earth runway, (01/19), was replaced by a longer asphalt runway, (18/36).

Since 2020 the airport has been undergoing a full reconstruction, (incomplete). Runway has been upgraded, lengthened and widened. Tower, hangar, and terminal, were all razed, and replaced by new structures.

In January 2024, Air Senegal launched flights to Dakar Léopold Sédar Senghor International Airport (DKR) on Mondays and Fridays.

The airport will become service hub for the Greater Tortue Ahmeyin (GTA) LNG project, and future adjacent field developments.
