= Air Senegal =

Flag carrier of Senegal

- Air Senegal Airbus A330-900neo
IATA	ICAO	Call sign
HC	SZN	SENSA
- Founded: 2016; 10 years ago
- Commenced operations: 14 May 2018; 8 years ago
- Hubs: Blaise Diagne International Airport
- Fleet size: 12
- Destinations: 22
- Headquarters: Diass, Thiès region, Senegal
- Key people: Ibrahima Kane (CEO); Ousmane Pouye (COO); Babakar Danfakha (CFO)
- Website: www.flyairsenegal.com

Air Senegal is the flag carrier of the Republic of Senegal. Created in 2016, it is state owned through investment arm Caisse des Dépots et Consignation du Sénégal. It is based at Blaise Diagne International Airport of Dakar, Senegal.

== History ==
The airline was created in 2016 to replace bankrupt carrier Senegal Airlines, which was under liquidation. The new national airline is part of a large, 20-year horizon investment plan referred to as Plan Sénégal Émergent (PSE) initiated by President Macky Sall. Air Senegal aims to be the leader in West African air transport. The airline is headed by Philippe Bohn, a former vice president of Airbus. It is advised by the financial advisory conglomerate Lazard.

On 29 April 2018, the airline received its Air Operator's Certificate (AOC), and commenced domestic flights on 14 May 2018 with a fleet of two brand new ATR72-600s. In the fourth quarter of 2018, it leased two Airbus A319s from Lessors Avolon and Apollo and started deploying to several regional destinations. The airline added a third A319 jet in June 2019 to serve regional destinations, including Abidjan, Cotonou and Conakry.

The airline ordered two long-haul wide-body Airbus A330-900s in November 2017 at the Dubai Air Show. It became the first African acquirer of this new type of aircraft. The first plane arrived in January 2019 after a delivery flight from Toulouse and launched the daily Dakar–Paris route.

In November 2019, at the 2019 Dubai Air Show, a Memorandum of Understanding was signed for 8 Airbus A220-300 regional jets, the airline's largest order so far. According to CEO Ibrahima Kane, "[They] will contribute to develop our long haul network to Europe and our regional network in Africa", with routes to London, Geneva and Lagos expected to be launched. The first A220 is expected to be delivered in 2021, and upon delivery Air Senegal will become the third African airline to operate the Airbus A220 after Air Tanzania and EgyptAir, and the first airline in West Africa to operate them.

The end of 2019 saw a big expansion for the carrier. In mid-November the airline strengthened its domestic links with a new route to Cap Skirring using its ATR 72-600s, its second domestic route after Ziguinchor. There was also expansion in the long haul sector with the arrival of a 2nd A330-900, which enabled the airline to begin flights to Marseille and Barcelona, the airline's first destination in Spain. The addition of 2 Boeing 737-500s on lease from Romanian airline Blue Air allowed Air Senegal to launch new routes to multiple countries in Western Africa, including Casablanca in Morocco, Ghana's capital city Accra, in addition to Abuja and Lagos in Nigeria.

Expansion was abruptly halted in March 2020 due to the onset of the COVID-19 pandemic, causing Air Senegal to temporarily suspend operations. At the time, the airline was poised to commence flights to a pair of new European destinations - Geneva and London. No update has been provided yet on when these routes will be commenced, though in a May 2021 interview it was hinted by Ibrahima Kane that they could be seen with the arrival of the Airbus A220s that the airline is due to receive in 2021. At the end of 2020 Air Senegal received its first Airbus A321, with a second arriving in February 2021. These 2 aircraft helped launch new routes again, this time to Milan in Italy, the airline's first Italian route, as well as Lyon in southern France. These routes began in February and March respectively. April saw the end of the lease on the 737-500s, with the second aircraft, YR-AMD, being returned to Blue Air where it has been parked at the carrier's base in Bucharest.

A significant step in the airline's growth came with the announcement of its plans to fly to the United States for the first time from September 2021. For thirteen months afterwards, the airline served New York directly with the Airbus A330-900, before making a short hop to the Baltimore/Washington airport. The route was operated twice weekly. In January 2023, the airline canceled the Baltimore stop, The flight to New York was subsequently eliminated from the schedule in September 2024, ending service to the United States.

== Corporate affairs ==
=== Business figures ===
Air Senegal does not make financial data available to the public. However, figures have been made available via press reports, interviews and other publications from time to time. The airline received a bailout of €68 million from the Government of Senegal in 2020 to cover its losses.

	2018	2019	2020
Turnover (€ million)		75.00	18.75
Net profit / loss (€ million)	loss	(30.00)	(68.00)
Number of passengers		495,000	
Number of aircraft (at year end)	3	6	7

=== Associations and memberships ===
In September 2019, Air Senegal was admitted as a member of the African Airlines Association (AFRAA).

== Destinations ==
As of November 2023, the airline serves 17 countries and 29 routes.

As of April 2021, Air Senegal operated to the following destinations:

Country	City	Airport	Notes	Refs
Benin	Cotonou	Cadjehoun Airport	Terminated	
Burkina Faso	Ouagadougou	Thomas Sankara International Airport	Terminated	
Cameroon	Douala	Douala International Airport	Terminated	
Cape Verde	Praia	Nelson Mandela International Airport		
Cape Verde	Sal	Amílcar Cabral International Airport		
Côte d'Ivoire	Abidjan	Félix-Houphouët-Boigny International Airport		
France	Lyon	Lyon–Saint-Exupéry Airport	Terminated	
France	Marseille	Marseille Provence Airport	Terminated	
France	Paris	Charles de Gaulle Airport		
Gabon	Libreville	Leon M'Ba International Airport	Terminated	
Gambia	Banjul	Banjul International Airport		
Guinea	Conakry	Conakry International Airport		
Guinea-Bissau	Bissau	Osvaldo Vieira International Airport		
Italy	Milan	Milan Malpensa Airport	Terminated	
Mali	Bamako	Bamako–Sénou International Airport		
Mauritania	Nouakchott	Nouakchott–Oumtounsy International Airport		
Morocco	Casablanca	Mohammed V International Airport		
Niger	Niamey	Diori Hamani International Airport	Terminated	
Nigeria	Abuja	Nnamdi Azikiwe International Airport	Terminated	
Nigeria	Lagos	Murtala Muhammed International Airport	Terminated	
Senegal	Cap Skirring	Cap Skirring Airport		
Senegal	Dakar	Blaise Diagne International Airport	Hub	
Senegal	Ziguinchor	Ziguinchor Airport		
Saudi Arabia	Jeddah	King Abdulaziz International Airport	Terminated	
Sierra Leone	Freetown	Freetown International Airport	Terminated	
Spain	Barcelona	Josep Tarradellas Barcelona–El Prat Airport	Terminated	
United States	Baltimore	Baltimore/Washington International Airport	Terminated	
United States	New York City	John F. Kennedy International Airport	Terminated	

=== Codeshare agreements ===
- Air Cote d'Ivoire
- Asky Airlines
- Royal Air Maroc

=== Interline agreements ===
- APG Airlines
- Hahn Air

== Fleet ==
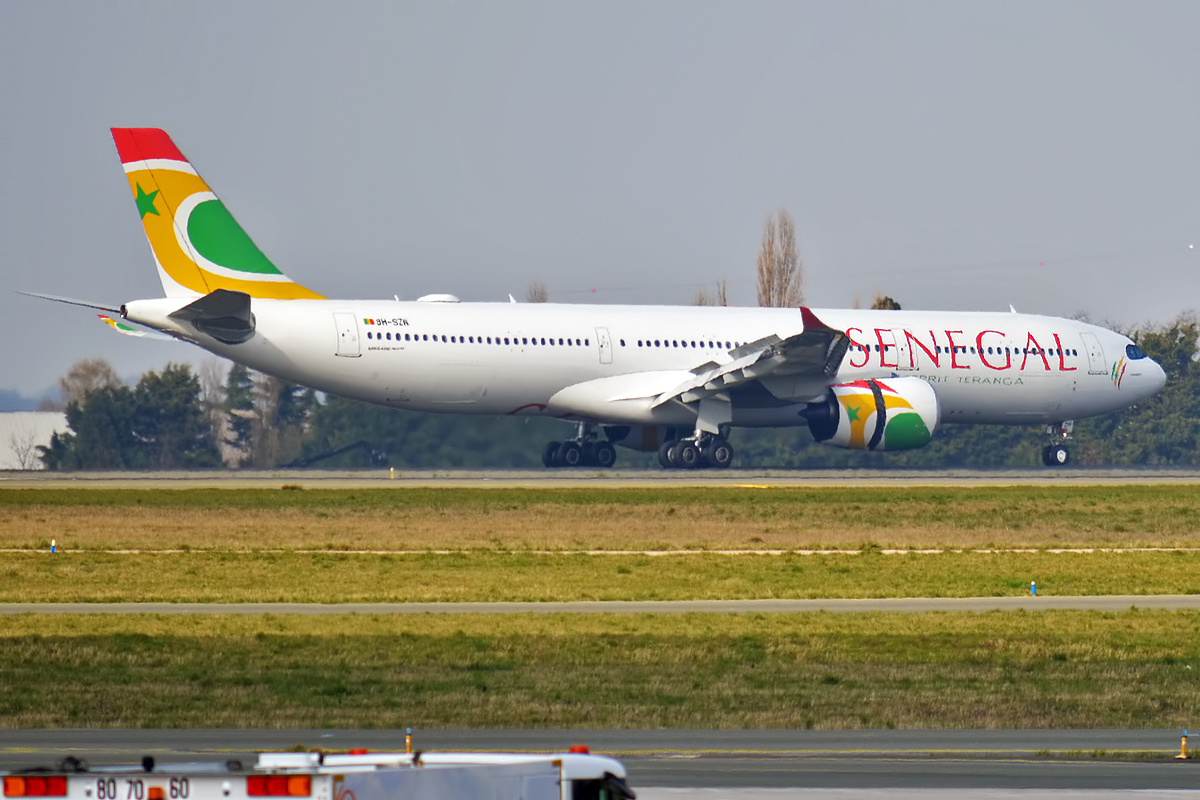
Air Senegal Airbus A330-900

Air Senegal Let L-410NG

As of November 2025, Air Senegal operates the following aircraft:

Air Senegal fleet
Aircraft	In service	Orders	Passengers				Notes
Aircraft	In service	Orders	C	P	Y	Total	Notes
Airbus A321-200	1	—	16	—	149	165	
ATR 72-600	2	—	—	—	70	70	
Boeing 737 MAX 8	—	9	TBA			178	
Let L-410NG	4	1	—	—	19	19	
Total	7	10					
