= List of defunct airlines of Equatorial Guinea =

This is a list of defunct airlines of Equatorial Guinea.

Airline	Image	IATA	ICAO	Callsign	Founded	Ceased operations	Notes
Aerolíneas de Guinea Ecuatorial			AGE		2003	2004	
Air Bas			RBS		2001	2007	Operated Antonov An-12, Ilyushin Il-18, Ilyushin Il-76, Yak-40, Yak-42
Air Consul			RCS	AEROCONSUL	1995	2005	Operated Piper Navajo
Air Guinea		LQ			2004	2005	
Air Annobón					2013	2016	
Air Services Guinea Equatorial			SVG		2000s	2000s	
Anton Air					2000s	2000s	Operated Antonov An-12
Ave de Guinea					2003	2004	
AVIAGE			VGG	AVIAGE	2000s	2000s	
Avirex Guinee Equatoriale			AXG	AVIREX	2004	2006	
BATA International Airways					1981	1983	Operated Boeing 707-420
CET Aviation			CNV		2006	2007	AOC revoked
Coage Airlines			COG	COAGE	1996	2006	Operated An-24, An-26, Fokker F28
Colair Litoral Airlines			CLO		1999	1999	
Confort Airlines					2011	2011	Operated ATR 72-202
Ducor World Airlines			DWA	DUCOR WORLD	2001	2004	Operated Lockheed L-1011 Tristar
Ecuato Guineana		8Y	GGE	ECUATO GUINEA	1986	2007	
Equatair			EQR	AERO EQUATAIR	2004	2006	Operated An-12, An-24
Equatorial Cargo			EQC	ECUA-CARGO	2002	2006	
Euroguineana de Aviación		8Y	EGA		1986	2015	Operated Boeing 737-200
Federal Air GE Airlines			FGE	FEDERAL GEE	1964	1964	
GATS Airlines			GTS	GATS AIR	1994	2005	
Guinea Airways		W2		GUINEA AIRWAYS	2007	????	
Guinea Ecuatorial Airlines			GEA	GEASA	1996	????	
Guinea Cargo			GNC	GUINEA CARGO	2003	2004	Operated HS 748
Guinea Equatorial de Transportes Aéreos			GET	GETRA	2000	2015	Operated An-24, DC-9, Fokker F28
Guinea Líneas Aéreas					2012	2015	Operated Boeing 737-800, Boeing 757-200
Jetline			JLE		1999	2007	Operated Douglas DC-8, BAC 1-11. AOC revoked
KNG Transavia Cargo			VCG	VIACARGO	2000	2007	Operated Antonov An-12
Líneas Aéreas Guinea Ecuatorial		IV	IVB		1970	1979	
Líneas EcuatoGuineanas de Aviacion			LAS	LEASA	1994	1995	Operated Fokker F27
Lotus Airways Cargo			LUS	LOTMORE	1998	2002	Operated Antonov An-12
Lotus International Air			LUS		2000	2006	
Nagesa Compania Aerea			NGS	NAGESA	2005	2006	
Prompt Air GE			POM	PROMPTAIR	2004	2006	Operated Antonov An-8
Punto Azul		ZR	PUN	PUNTO AZUL	2013	2017	Operated Embraer ERJ 145
Skymaster Freight Services			SYM		1999	2002	Operated Canadair CL-44D4-2
SOTIP					2000	2003	Operated Convair 440
Southern Gateway			SGE	SOUTH GATE	1998	2006	
Space Cargo			SGO		2005	2006	
Star Equatorial Airlines		2S			2006	2011	Operated Boeing 737-200
Tango Airways					2012	2017	AOC revoked. Operated MD-82
Trans Africa Airways GESA			TFR		2005	2006	
Unifly			UFL		2005	2006	
Union de Transporte Aéreo de Guinea Ecuatorial			UTG	UTAGE	2001	2007	
Victoria Air			VIT		1999	1999	

== See also ==
- List of airlines of Equatorial Guinea
- List of airports in Equatorial Guinea
- List of airlines
- List of air carriers banned in the European Union
