= List of airline codes (G) =

This is a list of all airline codes. The table lists the IATA airline designators, the ICAO airline designators and the airline call signs (telephony designator). Historical assignments are also included for completeness.

== Codes ==
Airline codes
| IATA | ICAO | Airline | Call sign | Country | Comments |
|---|---|---|---|---|---|
| | GML | G & L Aviation | GEEANDEL | South Africa | |
| | DBC | Gemini Air Group | DIAMOND BACK | United States | Allocated in 2014 |
| | GOP | Gospa Air | GOSPA AIR | Mexico | |
| | HGT | GMJ Air Shuttle | HIGHTECH | United States | Private air shuttle for Intel Corporation Employees |
| | GRE | Greenlandcopter | | Denmark | |
| | GMQ | Germania Express | CORGI | Germany | |
| | KNM | GB Helicopters | KINGDOM | United Kingdom | |
| | GCW | Global Air Crew | GLOBALCREW | Denmark | |
| | GBH | Global Avia Handling | | Russia | |
| Y5 | GMR | Golden Myanmar Airlines | GOLDEN MYANMAR | Myanmar | |
| | EXH | G5 Executive | BATMAN | Switzerland | |
| | MTA | GAK/Mitchell Aero | GAK AVIATION | United States | |
| | GGS | GATSA | GATSA | Mexico | |
| | GBX | GB Airlink | ISLAND TIGER | United States | |
| GT | GBL | GB Airways | GEEBEE AIRWAYS | United Kingdom | |
| | GCS | GCS Air Service | GALION | United States | |
| | FFU | GEC Marconi Avionics | FERRANTI | United Kingdom | |
| | GCC | GECAS | GECAS | Ireland | |
| | GEN | GENSA | GENSA-BRASIL | Brazil | |
| | GET | Get High | AIR FLOW | Portugal | |
| | GET | GETRA | GETRA | Equatorial Guinea | ICAO Code no longer allocated |
| | GFW | GFW Aviation | | Australia | |
| | GGT | Trans Island Airways | THUNDERBALL | Bahamas | |
| | GHI | GH Stansted Limited | | United Kingdom | |
| Z5 | GMG | GMG Airlines | GMG | Bangladesh | |
| | GPE | GP Express Airlines | REGIONAL EXPRESS | United States | |
| | GPR | GPM Aeroservicio | GPM AEROSERVICIO | Mexico | |
| | GIB | GR-Avia | GRAVIA | Guinea | |
| | BMK | GST Aero Aircompany | MURAT | Kazakhstan | |
| | GTX | GTA Air | BIG-DEE | United States | |
| | GAH | Ga-Ma Helicoptere | GAMHELICO | France | |
| | GBE | Gabon Express | GABEX | Gabon | |
| | GRT | Gabon-Air-Transport | | Gabon | |
| | GIG | Gacela Air Cargo | GACELA AIR | Mexico | |
| | GFC | Gail Force Express | GAIL FORCE | United States | |
| | GNJ | Gain Jet Aviation | HERCULES JET | Greece | |
| | SWF | Galair International | GALAIR | United Kingdom | |
| | GLS | Galaircervis | GALS | Ukraine | |
| 7O | GAL | Galaxy Air | GALAXY | Kyrgyzstan | |
| | GXY | Galaxy Airlines | GALAX | Japan | |
| | GAS | Galena Air Service | GALENA AIR SERVICE | United States | |
| 1G | | Galileo International | | United States | |
| | GMA | Gama Aviation | GAMA | United Kingdom | |
| | GCH | Gama Aviation Switzerland | GAMA SWISS | Switzerland | |
| GC | GNR | Gambia International Airlines | GAMBIA INTERNATIONAL | Gambia | |
| | NML | Gambia New Millennium Air | NEWMILL | Gambia | |
| | GMJ | Gamisa Aviación | GAMISA | Spain | |
| G7 | GNF | Gandalf Airlines | Gandalf | Italy | |
| | GAN | Gander Aviation | GANAIR | Canada | |
| | GSA | Garden State Airlines | GARDEN STATE | United States | |
| | AHM | Garrison Aviation | AIR HURON | Canada | |
| GA | GIA | Garuda Indonesia | INDONESIA | Indonesia | |
| | GHS | Gatari Hutama Air Services | GATARI | Indonesia | |
| | EGO | Gauteng Air Cargo | GAUTENG | South Africa | |
| | GVN | Gavina | GAVINA | Spain | |
| 4G | GZP | Gazpromavia | GAZPROMAVIA | Russia | |
| | GEE | Geesair | GEESAIR | Canada | |
| | GLX | Gelix Airlines | RUSSIAN BIRD | Russia | |
| GR | GCO | Gemini Air Cargo | GEMINI | United States | |
| | GAB | Gendall Air | GENDALL | Canada | |
| | GDB | Gendarmerie Belge | BELGIAN GENERMERIE | Belgium | |
| | FGN | National Gendarmerie | FRANCE GENDARME | France | |
| | SWK | General Aerospace | SKYWALKER | Canada | |
| | GWS | General Airways | GENAIR | South Africa | |
| | GNZ | General Aviation | GONZO | Poland | |
| | GTH | General Aviation Flying Services | GOTHAM | United States | |
| | XGA | General Aviation Terminal | | Canada | |
| | GMC | General Motors | GENERAL MOTORS | United States | |
| | GNX | Genex | | Belarus | |
| | GSL | Geographic Air Surveys | SURVEY-CANADA | Canada | |
| A9 | TGZ | Georgian Airways | TAMAZI | Georgia | |
| | FGA | Georgian Aviation Federation | GEORGIA FED | Georgia | |
| | GGF | Georgian Cargo Airlines Africa | GEORGIAN AFRICA | Senegal | |
| QB | GFG | Georgian National Airlines | NATIONAL | Georgia | |
| | | Great Barrier Airlines | | New Zealand | Not ICAO allocated – GBA issued for domestic use by the Civil Aviation Authority of New Zealand |
| | GAF | German Air Force | GERMAN AIR FORCE | Germany | |
| | GAM | German Army | GERMAN ARMY | Germany | |
| | GNY | German Navy | GERMAN NAVY | Germany | |
| HE | LGW | Luftfahrtgesellschaft Walter | WALTER | Germany | Former name: Luftfahrtgesellschaft Walter |
| ZQ | GER | German Airways | GERMAN EAGLE | Germany | |
| | GHY | German Sky Airlines | GERMAN SKY | Germany | |
| ST | GMI | Germania | GERMANIA | Germany | |
| 4U | GWI | Germanwings | GERMAN WINGS | Germany | |
| | GDN | Gerry's Dnata | | Pakistan | |
| | GFD | Gesellschaft Fur Flugzieldarstellung | KITE | Germany | |
| GP | RIV | APG Airlines | RIVERA | France | |
| | GES | Gestair | GESTAIR | Spain | |
| | GTR | Gestar | STAR GESTAR | Chile | |
| | GJT | Gestión Aérea Ejecutiva | BANJET | Spain | |
| | GHT | Ghadames Air Transport | | Libya | |
| GH | GLP | Globus Airlines | GLOBUS | Russia | |
| GH | GHA | Ghana Airways | GHANA | Ghana | defunct |
| G0 | GHB | Ghana International Airlines | GHANA AIRLINES | Ghana | |
| | NTC | Gibson Aviation | NIGHT CHASE | United States | |
| | RPS | Global Air Charter | RESPONSE | United States | |
| | GAG | Greybird Pilot Academy | GEEBIRD | Denmark | |
| | DMJ | Global Air | DAMOJH | Mexico | defunct |
| | GBS | Global Air Services Nigeria | GLOBAL SERVE | Nigeria | |
| | GLC | Global Aircargo | | Bahrain | |
| | | Global Airways (Turks and Caicos) | | Turks and Caicos Islands | |
| | BSP | Global Airways (BSP) | | Democratic Republic of Congo | |
| | GLB | Global Airways (GLB) | GLO-AIR | United States | Air Castle Corporation |
| | GBB | Global Aviation Operations | GLOBE | South Africa | |
| | GAK | Global Aviation and Services Group | AVIAGROUP | Libya | |
| | GGZ | Global Georgian Airways | GLOBAL GEORGIAN | Georgia | |
| | GLJ | Global Jet Austria | GLOBAL JET AUSTRIA | Austria | |
| | NSM | Global Jet Corporation | THUNDERCLOUD | United States | |
| | SVW | Global Jet Luxembourg | SILVER ARROWS | Luxembourg | |
| | GSK | Global Sky Aircharter | GLOBAL SKY | United States | |
| | GSS | Global Supply Systems | JET LIFT | United Kingdom | |
| | XGS | Global System | | United States | |
| | XGW | Global Weather Dynamics | | United States | |
| | GLW | Global Wings | | Japan | |
| | GJA | Globe Jet | | Lebanon | |
| | GAC | GlobeAir | DREAM TEAM | Austria | |
| 6G | RLX | Go2Sky | RELAX | Slovakia | |
| G8 | GOW | GoAir | GOAIR | India | |
| GK | | Go One Airways | | United Kingdom | Defunct? |
| G7 | GJS | GoJet Airlines | LINDBERGH | United States | |
| | GGE | Gobierno De Guinea Ecuatorial | | Equatorial Guinea | |
| | GOF | Gof-Air | GOF-AIR | Mexico | |
| | GOI | Gofir | SWISS HAWK | Switzerland | |
| G3 | GLO | Gol Transportes Aéreos | GOL TRANSPORTE | Brazil | Brazilian low-cost airline. |
| | GBT | Gold Belt Air Transport | GOLD BELT | Canada | defunct |
| | GDA | GoldAir | AIR PARTNER | United Kingdom | |
| | GDK | Goldeck-Flug | GOLDECK FLUG | Austria | |
| DC | GAO | Golden Air | GOLDEN | Sweden | |
| | GDD | Golden Airlines | GOLDEN AIRLINES | United States | |
| | GPA | Golden Pacific Airlines | GOLDEN PAC | United States | |
| | GRS | Golden Rule Airlines | GOLDEN RULE | Kyrgyzstan | |
| | GLD | Golden Star Air Cargo | GOLDEN STAR | Sudan | |
| | GOS | Goldfields Air Services | | Australia | |
| | GAQ | Golfe Air Quebec | GOLFAIR | Canada | |
| | GLE | Goliaf Air | GOLIAF AIR | São Tomé and Príncipe | |
| | GOM | Gomel Airlines | GOMEL | Belarus | |
| 5Z | GON | Gonini Air Services | GONINI | Suriname | defunct |
| | RDR | Goodridge (UK) Limited | RED STAR | United Kingdom | |
| G1 | | Gorkha Airlines | GORKHA AIRLINES | Nepal | ?ICAO |
| | GOR | Gorlitsa Airlines | GORLITSA | Ukraine | |
| | HKG | Government Flying Service | HONGKONG GOVERNMENT | Hong Kong SAR of China | |
| | GRZ | Government of Zambia Communications Flight | COM FLIGHT | Zambia | |
| | HLD | Grampian Flight Centre | GRANITE | United Kingdom | |
| | GAV | Granada Aviación | GRANAVI | Spain | |
| | GAE | Grand Aire Express | GRAND EXPRESS | United States | |
| | GND | Grand Airways | GRAND VEGAS | United States | |
| | CVU | Grand Canyon Airlines | CANYON VIEW | United States | |
| GV | GUN | Grant Aviation | HOOT | United States | |
| | LMK | Grantex Aviation | LANDMARK | United Kingdom | |
| | GRA | Great American Airways | GREAT AMERICAN | United States | Defunct |
| | GRA | Guardian Air Asset Management | FLEX | South Africa | issued in 2017 |
| ZK | GLA | Great Lakes Airlines | LAKES AIR | United States | |
| | GLU | Great Lakes Airways (Uganda) | LAKES CARGO | Uganda | |
| | GRP | Great Plains Airlines | GREAT PLAINS | United States | |
| IJ | GWL | Great Wall Airlines | GREAT WALL | China | |
| | GWA | Great Western Air | G-W AIR | United States | |
| HB | HGB | Greater Bay Airlines | GREATER BAY | Hong Kong | |
| | HNA | Greek Navy | HELLENIC NAVY | Greece | |
| | GFF | Griffin Aviation | GRIFFIN AIR | Cyprus | |
| | GXA | Grixona | GRIXONA | Moldova | |
| | GZD | Grizodubova Air Company | GRIZODUBOVA AIR | Russia | |
| | HTG | Grossmann Air Service | GROSSMANN | Austria | |
| | GSJ | Grossmann Jet Service | GROSSJET | Czech Republic | |
| | GHV | Ground Handling Service de Mexico | GROUND HANDLING | Mexico | |
| | GPM | Grup Air-Med | GRUPOMED | Spain | |
| | EJC | Grupo De Aviación Ejecutiva | GRUPOEJECUTIVA | Mexico | |
| | TAT | Grupo TACA | TACA-COSTARICA | Costa Rica | |
| | VMM | Grupo Vuelos Mediterraneo | VUELOS MED | Spain | |
| | GMT | Grupo Aéreo Monterrey | GRUPOMONTERREY | Mexico | |
| | GSY | Guard Systems | GUARD AIR | Norway | |
| G6 | BSR | Guine Bissaur Airlines | BISSAU AIRLINES | Guinea-Bissau | |
| | GIJ | Guinea Airways | GUINEA AIRWAYS | Guinea | |
| | GNC | Guinea Cargo | GUINEA CARGO | Equatorial Guinea | |
| J9 | GIF | Guinee Airlines | GUINEE AIRLINES | Guinea | defunct |
| | GEA | Guinea Ecuatorial Airlines | GEASA | Equatorial Guinea | |
| | GIQ | Guinee Paramount Airlines | GUIPAR | Guinea | |
| | CGH | Guizhou Airlines | GUIZHOU | China | |
| | GUS | Guja | GUJA | Mexico | |
| G8 | GUJ | Gujarat Airways | GUJARATAIR | India | |
| | TSU | Gulf & Caribbean Cargo / Contract Air Cargo | TRANSAUTO | United States | |
| | GUF | Gulf African Airlines | GULF AFRICAN | The Gambia | |
| GF | GFA | Gulf Air | GULF AIR | Bahrain | |
| | GAT | Gulf Air Inc | GULF TRANS | United States | |
| | GCN | Gulf Central Airlines | GULF CENTRAL | United States | |
| | SFY | Gulf Flite Center | SKY FLITE | United States | |
| | GPC | Gulf Pearl Air Lines | AIR GULFPEARL | Libya | |
| | GLF | Gulfstream Aerospace | GULFSTREAM TEST | United States | |
| | GFS | Gulfstream Airlines | GULFSTAR | United States | |
| | GFT | Gulfstream International Airlines | GULF FLIGHT | United States | |
| | GUL | Gull Air | GULL-AIR | United States | |
| | GUM | Gum Air | GUM AIR | Suriname | |
| | GDH | Guneydogu Havacilik Isletmesi | RISING SUN | Turkey | |
| GY | | Guyana Airways 2000 | | | |
| | GWN | Gwyn Aviation | GWYN | United Kingdom | |

== IATA Traffic Conference Areas ==
The International Air Transport Association (IATA) divides the world into three areas called the Traffic Conference Areas (TCAs) for air travel purposes. These areas are used to define geographical boundaries for fare construction and other industry-related practices:

- Traffic Conference Area 1 (TC1) – this area includes the Americas, encompassing North America (the Caribbean, Central America, and Northern America) and South America.
- Traffic Conference Area 2 (TC2) – this area includes the EMEA region, encompassing Europe, the Middle East, and Africa (North Africa and Sub-Saharan Africa).
- Traffic Conference Area 3 (TC3) – this area includes the Asia–Pacific region, encompassing the rest of Asia (Central Asia, East Asia, North Asia, South Asia, and Southeast Asia) and Oceania.

Essentially, TC1 covers the "New World", while TC2 and TC3 together cover the "Old World" (Africa-Eurasia) and the "Land Down Under".

== See also ==
- IATA airport code
- ICAO airport code
