= EXH =

EXH may refer to:

- EXH, ICAO airline code for G5 Executive of Switzerland
- EXH: Exile House, 2009 TV programme featuring Makidai
- EXH, former New York Stock Exchange ticker for Exterran Corporation
