= GZD =

GZD or Gzd may refer to:

- GZD, Pinyin code for Guangzhou East railway station, China
- GZD, telegraph code for Gaoqiaozhen railway station, a stop on the Shenyang–Shanhaiguan railway, China
- Gzd, mineral symbol for Gruzdevite
- Grid Zone Designation, a system for navigating the United States National Grid
- Galactic Zoo Dossier, magazine drawn by Plastic Crimewave
- GZD, ICAO airline code for Grizodubova Air Company, Russia
