= GIQ =

GIQ or giq can refer to:

- Government Information Quarterly, academic journal
- Guinee Paramount Airlines, Guinea-based airline; see List of airline codes (G)
- Hagei language, Kra-Dai language of China and Vietnam
