= Líneas Aéreas de Guinea Ecuatorial =

| IATA | ICAO | Call sign |
|---|---|---|
| IV | IVB | — |
- Founded: 1970
- Ceased operations: 1979
- Headquarters: Malabo

Líneas Aéreas de Guinea Ecuatorial (LAGE) was the national airline of Equatorial Guinea. It had its headquarters in Malabo.

== History ==
The carrier was created as the national airline of Equatorial Guinea in 1970, after the country's independence. From Bata, the airline served Douala, Libreville and Malabo with a fleet of Convair 440s leased from Iberia. LAGE ceased operations in 1979, following the withdrawal of these aircraft from service.

== See also ==
- List of airlines of Equatorial Guinea
- List of defunct airlines of Equatorial Guinea
