= Jet line =

Jet line, jetline, or, variation, may refer to:

== Aviation ==
- Airlines which fly jetliners
- Airway (aviation), pathway in the sky for jets
- Contrail, the line in the sky following jets

=== Airlines ===
- Canada Jetlines (ICAO airline code: CJL; callsign: JETBUS), Canadian discount air carrier
- Jet Line International (ICAO airline code: MJL; callsign: MOLDJET), Moldovan airline, see List of defunct airlines of Moldova
- Eurojet Limited (ICAO airline code: JLN; callsign: JET LINE), Maltan airline, see List of airline codes (E)
- Jetline (ICAO airline code: JLE), see List of airlines of Equatorial Guinea

== Other uses ==
- Jetline, a roller coaster

== See also ==
- Jetstream, a high speed natural air stream in the upper atmosphere, a river of air, a conveyor line of weather
- Jet (disambiguation)
- Line (disambiguation)
