= 2005 Equatorial Express Airlines An-24 crash =

Fatal aviation accident in Equatorial Guinea

2005 Equatorial Express Airlines Antonov An-24 crash
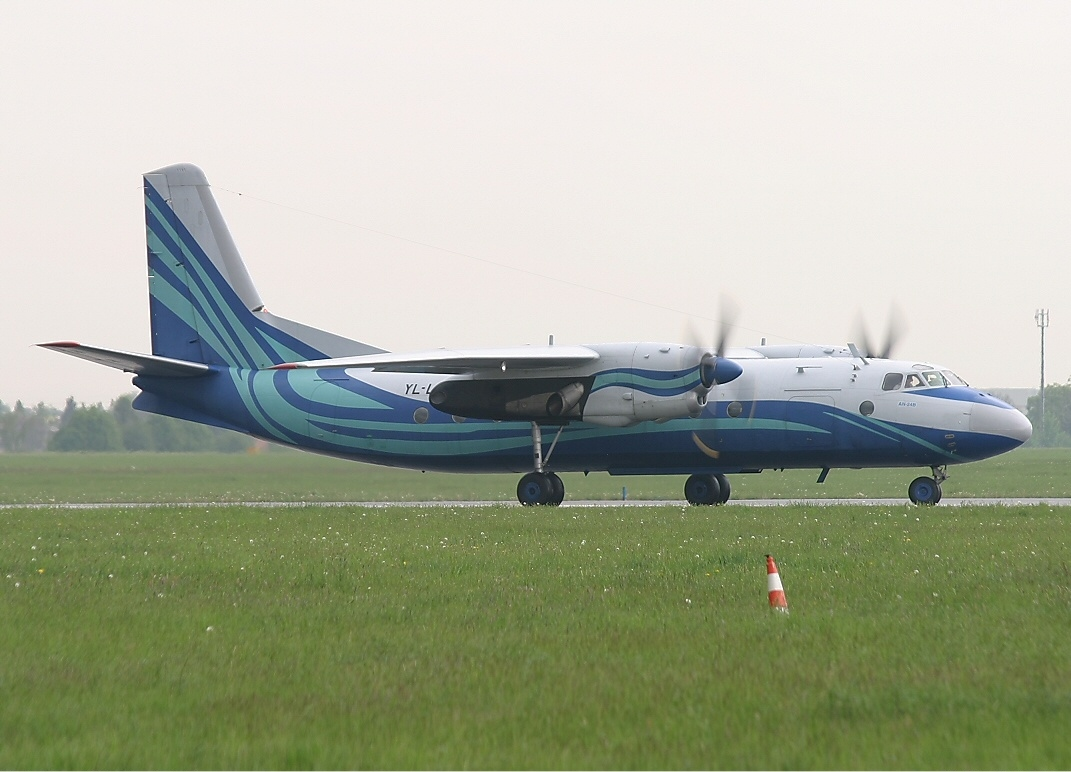
- An Antonov An-24, similar to the aircraft involved

Accident
- Date: 16 July 2005
- Summary: Loss of control
- Site: Near Baney, Equatorial Guinea

Aircraft
- Aircraft type: Antonov An-24
- Operator: Equatorial Express Airlines now Equatair
- Registration: 3C-VQR
- Flight origin: Malabo International Airport
- Destination: Bata Airport
- Occupants: 60
- Passengers: 54
- Crew: 6
- Fatalities: 60
- Survivors: 0

On 16 July 2005, an Equatorial Express Airlines Antonov An-24 crashed into the side of a mountain near Baney, Equatorial Guinea killing all 60 occupants on board the aircraft, making it Equatorial Guinea's deadliest plane crash.

== Aircraft ==
The aircraft that was used on this flight was an Antonov An-24 registration 3C-VQR that had its first flight back in 1967. It had flown for Aerolíneas de Guinea Ecuatorial (AGE) from February 2002 after being brought to Equatorial Guinea. It has been reported that the aircraft did not receive its 1,000-hour maintenance check after moving to Equatorial Express.

== Accident ==
The flight took off from Malabo International Airport on a short haul flight to Bata Airport with 54 passengers and 6 crew on board. Just minutes into the flight the aircraft tilted and fell, skidded over trees for a distance of about half a mile and crashed into a side of mountainous jungle area near Baney at 10:00pm. An hour later the wreck of the aircraft was found and there were some conflicting reports regarding the number of persons on board. According to the airline, the flight manifest shows 10 crew and 35 passengers. Government sources reported 60 people were on the plane, after first reports of 55 occupants. The total bodies found at the crash site were 60 passengers and crew.
