= Shanghai Airlines Cargo =

Cargo airline of China (2006–2011)

IATA	ICAO	Call sign
F4	SHQ	SHANGHAI CARGO
- Commenced operations: June 2006
- Ceased operations: 2011 (merged into China Cargo Airlines)
- Hubs: Shanghai Pudong International Airport
- Parent company: Shanghai Airlines
- Headquarters: Shanghai, China
- Website: shanghai-air.com

Shanghai Airlines Cargo International Co. was established as a joint venture in 2006, with Shanghai Airlines holding a 55% stake and EVA Air holding a 25% stake.

== History ==
Shanghai Airlines and EVA Air launched Shanghai Airlines Cargo in June 2006 as a joint venture. It was set up with a starting operating capital of ¥120 million (US$17,269,529). Two additional investments brought the operating capital to ¥464 million (US$66,775,513) by 2008. The airline was headquartered at Shanghai Pudong International Airport. The airline had Asian, European, and American customers. In 2009, it had a Boeing 747-200F it had rented from China Southern Airlines and three McDonnell Douglas MD-11Fs. In 2010, China Eastern Airlines said it intended to consolidate three companies into a new air freight carrier: China Cargo Airlines, Great Wall Airlines, and Shanghai Airlines Cargo. The merger completed in December 2010.

== Destinations ==
Shanghai Airlines Cargo served the following destinations:

- Mainland China
  - Shanghai (Shanghai Pudong International Airport) Hub
- Hong Kong
  - Hong Kong International Airport
- Japan
  - Osaka (Kansai International Airport)
- Singapore
  - Singapore (Changi Airport)
- South Korea
  - Seoul (Incheon International Airport)
- Thailand
  - Bangkok (Suvarnabhumi Airport)
- United States
  - Anchorage (Ted Stevens Anchorage International Airport)
  - Chicago (O'Hare International Airport)
  - Los Angeles (Los Angeles International Airport)

== Fleet ==
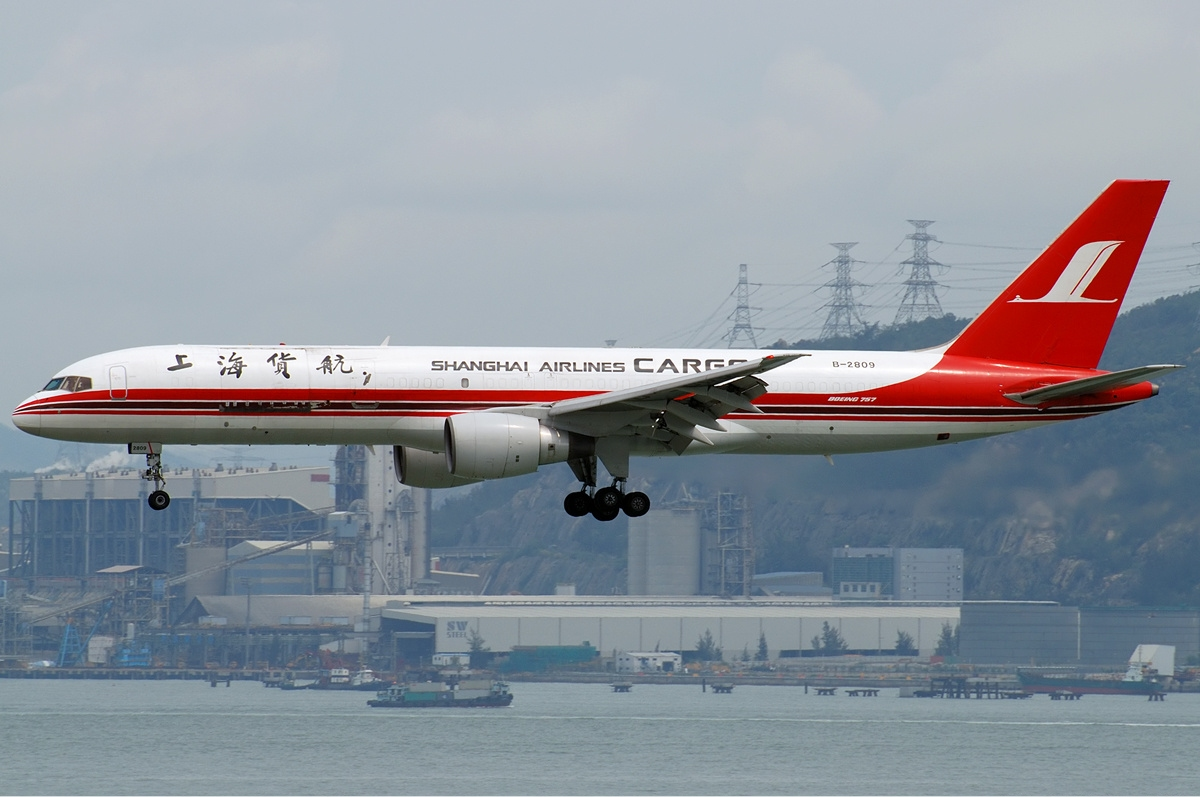
Shanghai Airlines Cargo Boeing 757-200

During its five-year existence, Shanghai Airlines Cargo had operated the following aircraft:

- 2 Boeing 757-200F
- 3 McDonnell Douglas MD-11F
- Boeing 737-300F
