= Air Annobón =

Equatoguinean airline

IATA	ICAO	Call sign
?	?	?
- Founded: 2012
- Commenced operations: 25 January 2013
- Ceased operations: 31 August 2016
- Fleet size: 1 (March 2014)
- Destinations: 2 (March 2014)
- Headquarters: San Antonio de Palé, Annobón, Equatorial Guinea
- Key people: Cándido Nsue Okomo, owner

Air Annobón was an Equatoguinean airline. It began operations in January 2013 with flights between Malabo and Bata. Flights were operated by wet leased BAe 146-300s until the airline purchased its own BAe 146-200. In September 2016, Air Annobón suspended operations; it was unsuccessful in its search for a joint venture partner with whom to resume flights as a low-cost carrier.

== History ==
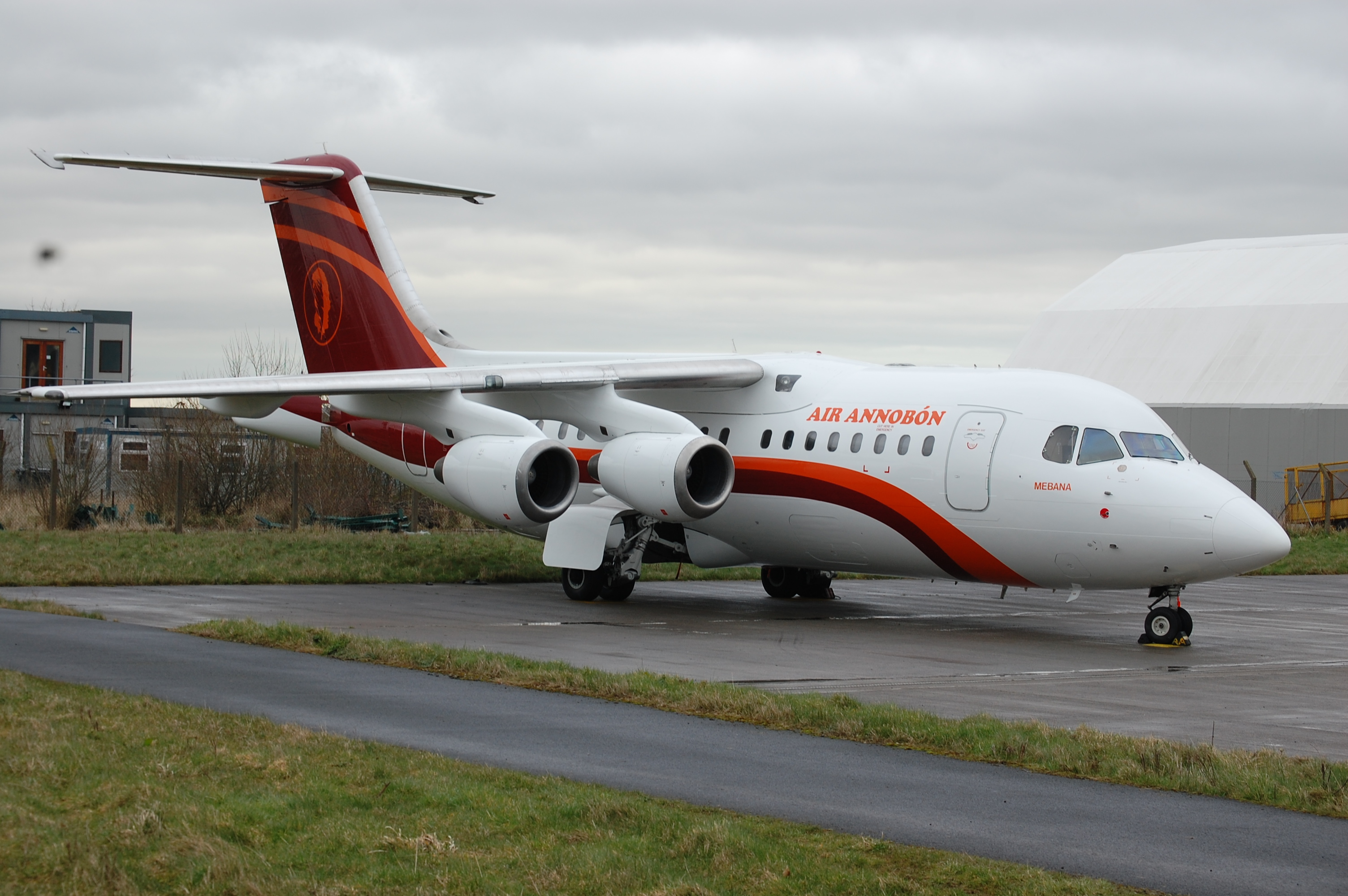
An Air Annobón BAe 146-200 at Dublin Airport in 2014, awaiting delivery

Air Annobón was founded in 2012 and received its first aircraft, a BAe 146-300, in July 2012. The airline launched operations on 25 January 2013 with a flight between Malabo and Bata. An additional BAe 146-300 arrived at a later date. Both aircraft were wet leased from South African company Fair Aviation. In 2014 Air Annobón took delivery of a BAe 146-200, which it had purchased itself. The aircraft replaced the wet leased BAe 146-300s.

Ch-aviation reported in September 2016 that Air Annobón had suspended operations but that it was seeking to restart them as a low-cost carrier with a joint venture partner, who would need to provide aircraft., there are no news on a restoration of the airline so far, it seems definitely out of business. On August 31 2016, the airline completed its final flight and ceased operations.

== Corporate affairs ==
Air Annobón is owned by Cándido Nsue Okomo, director of state oil company GEPetrol and brother of President Teodoro Obiang Nguema Mbasogo's wife. The airline has its headquarters in San Antonio de Palé, the capital of Annobón Province. Its slogans include "Quality, punctuality and safety" and "The airline that brings you closer to those you love most", which appear in a 2014 advertisement.

== Operations ==
In March 2014, Air Annobón was operating flights between Bata and Malabo with a single BAe 146-200.

== See also ==
- List of defunct airlines of Equatorial Guinea
