= Aerolíneas de Guinea Ecuatorial =

- Founded: 2003
- Ceased operations: 2004
- Operating bases: Malabo, Equatorial Guinea

Aerolíneas de Guinea Ecuatorial was a cargo airline based in Malabo, Equatorial Guinea. It was established in 2003.

The company was closed in 2004 by order of the government and its Antonov aircraft was used to create Equatair.

== Fleet ==
The Aerolíneas de Guinea Ecuatorial fleet consisted of

- 1 – Antonov An-24B aircraft (at January 2005)

== See also ==
- List of defunct airlines of Equatorial Guinea
