= China Cargo Airlines =

Cargo division of China Eastern Airlines; based in Shanghai

China Cargo Airlines 中国货运航空

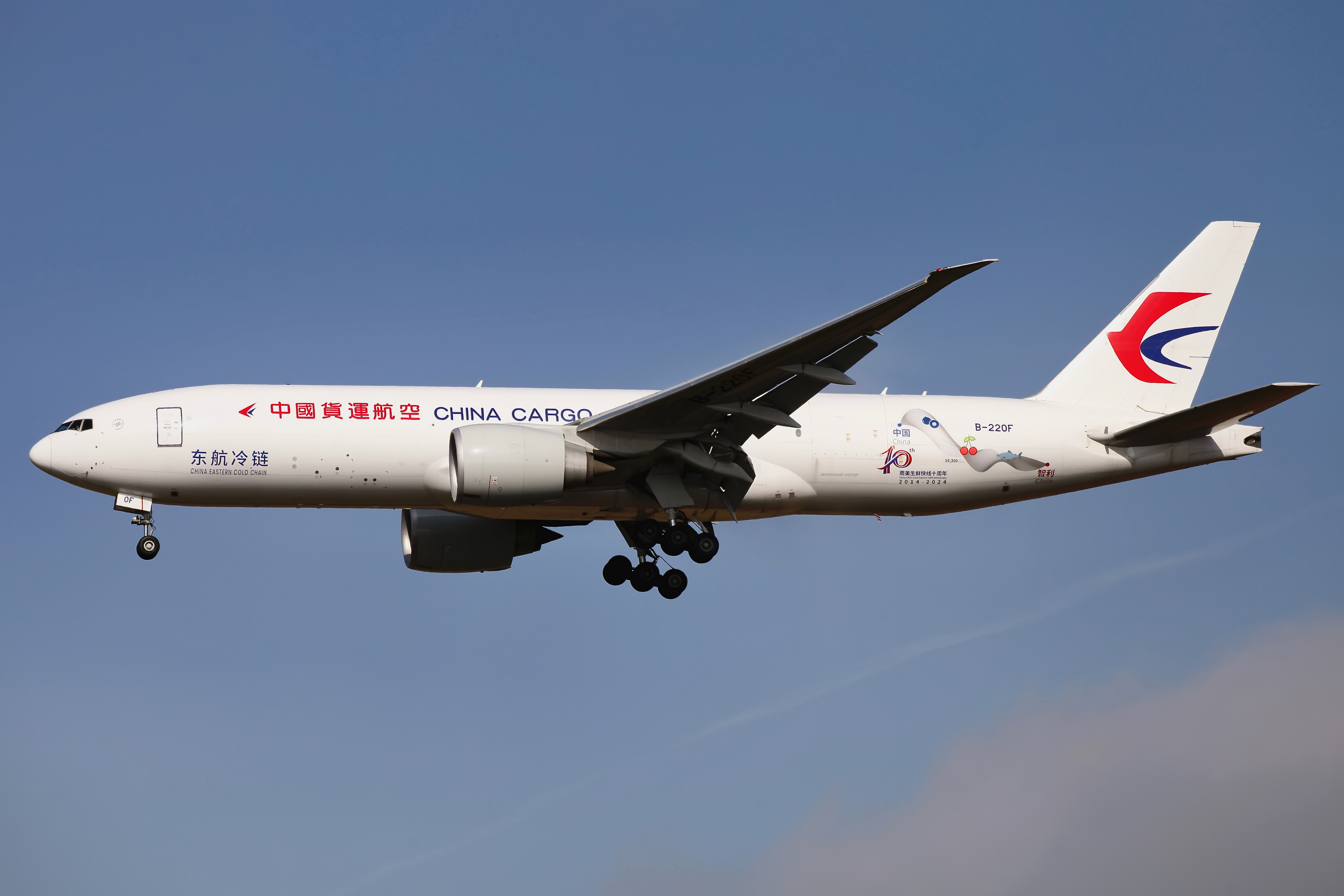
- China Cargo Airlines Boeing 777F wearing the "China Eastern Cold Chain (东航冷链)" sticker
IATA	ICAO	Call sign
CK	CKK	CARGO KING
- Founded: 30 July 1998; 28 years ago
- Commenced operations: October 1998; 28 years ago
- Hubs: Shanghai Pudong International Airport
- Alliance: SkyTeam Cargo
- Fleet size: 15
- Destinations: 28
- Parent company: China Eastern Airlines (51%)
- Headquarters: Changning, Shanghai, China
- Website: www.ckair.com/index.html

China Cargo Airlines
- Traditional Chinese: 中國貨運航空公司
- Simplified Chinese: 中国货运航空公司
Transcriptions
Standard Mandarin
- Hanyu Pinyin: zhōngguó huòyùn hángkōng gōngsī
Yue: Cantonese
- Jyutping: zung1 gwok3 fo3 wan6 hong4 hung1 gung1 si1

China Cargo Airlines (Chinese: 中国货运航空公司), sometimes abbreviated as CCA (中货航), is a cargo airline with its head office on Changning District in Shanghai, People's Republic of China. It is China's first all-cargo airline operating dedicated freight services using China Eastern Airlines route structure. Its headquarters is near Shanghai Hongqiao International Airport, with a sole hub at Shanghai Pudong International Airport.

== History ==
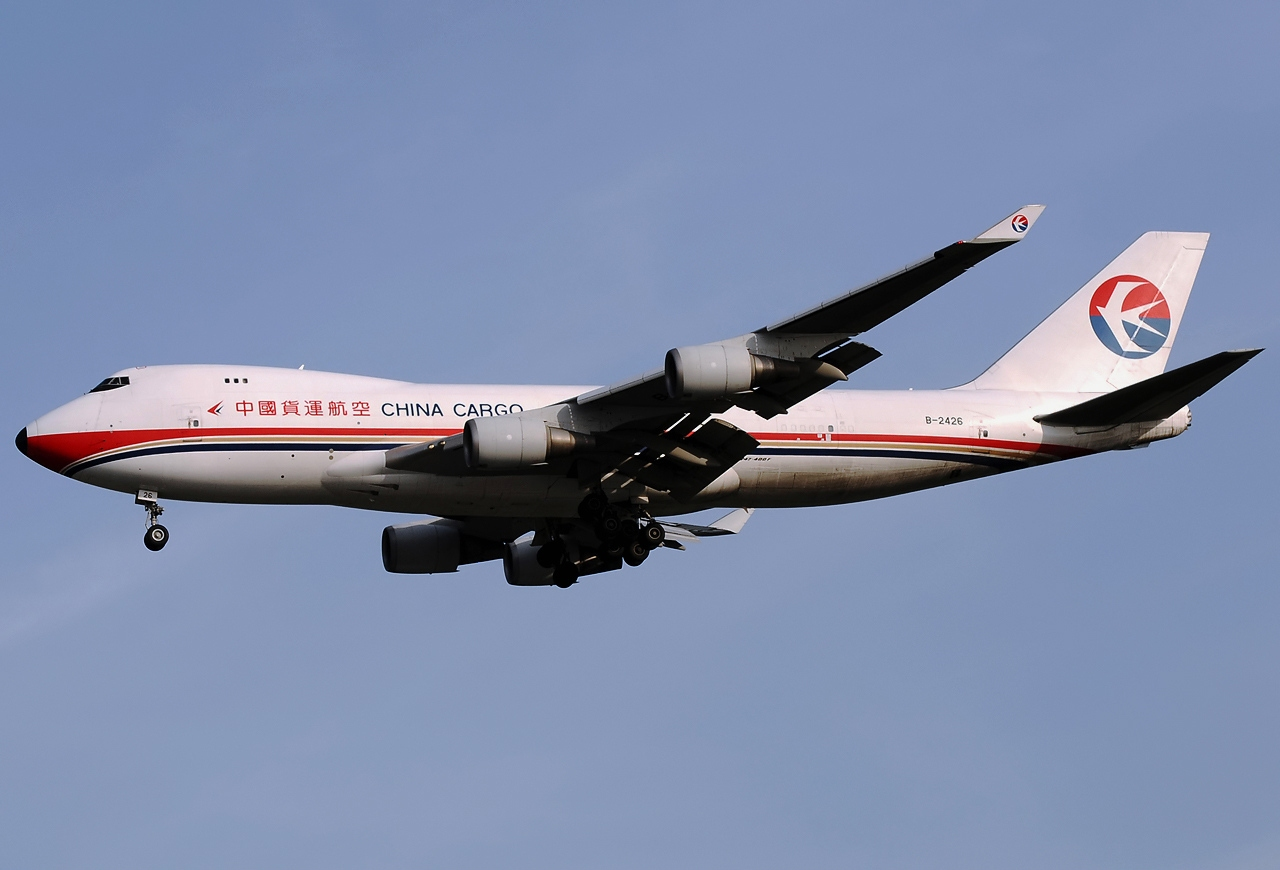
China Cargo Airlines Boeing 747-400ERF in the airline's previous livery.

The airline was established on 30 July 1998 and started operations in October 1998. It was founded as, and remains, a joint venture between China Eastern Airlines (70%) and China Ocean Shipping (30%). It briefly adopted the title China Eastern Airlines Cargo, and reverted to its original name again after becoming an independent subsidiary in 2004.

Its parent company China Eastern Airlines reached agreement to inject more capital into the cargo airline. Its stake fell from 70 percent to just over 51 percent. China Ocean Shipping's share reduced to 17 percent. This allowed Singapore Airlines Cargo to invest up to 16 percent of the cargo airline. EVA Air also purchased a 16 percent share of the airline.

In 2011, China Cargo Airlines merged operations with Great Wall Airlines and Shanghai Airlines Cargo. The two airlines were rebranded as China Cargo Airlines progressively.

== Fleet ==
=== Current fleet ===
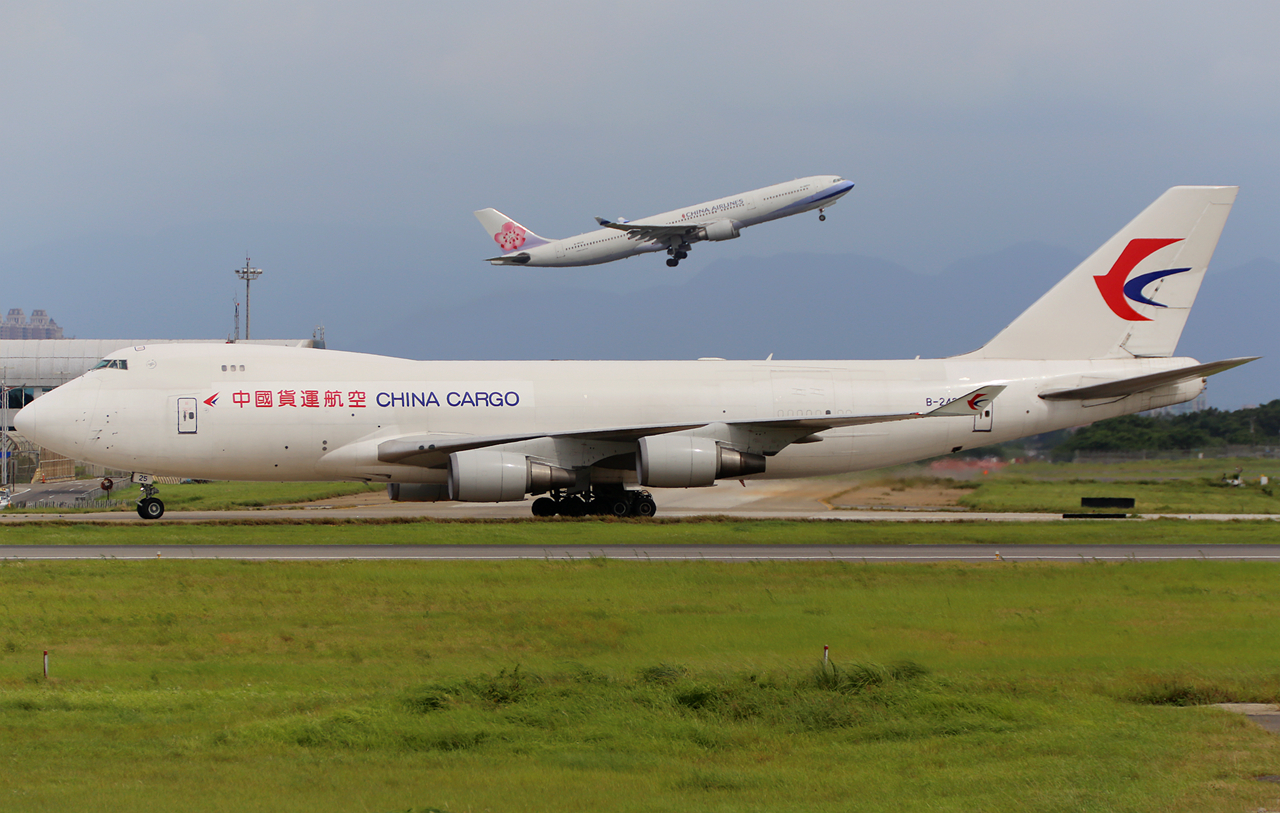
China Cargo Airlines Boeing 747-400ERF in the airline's current livery.

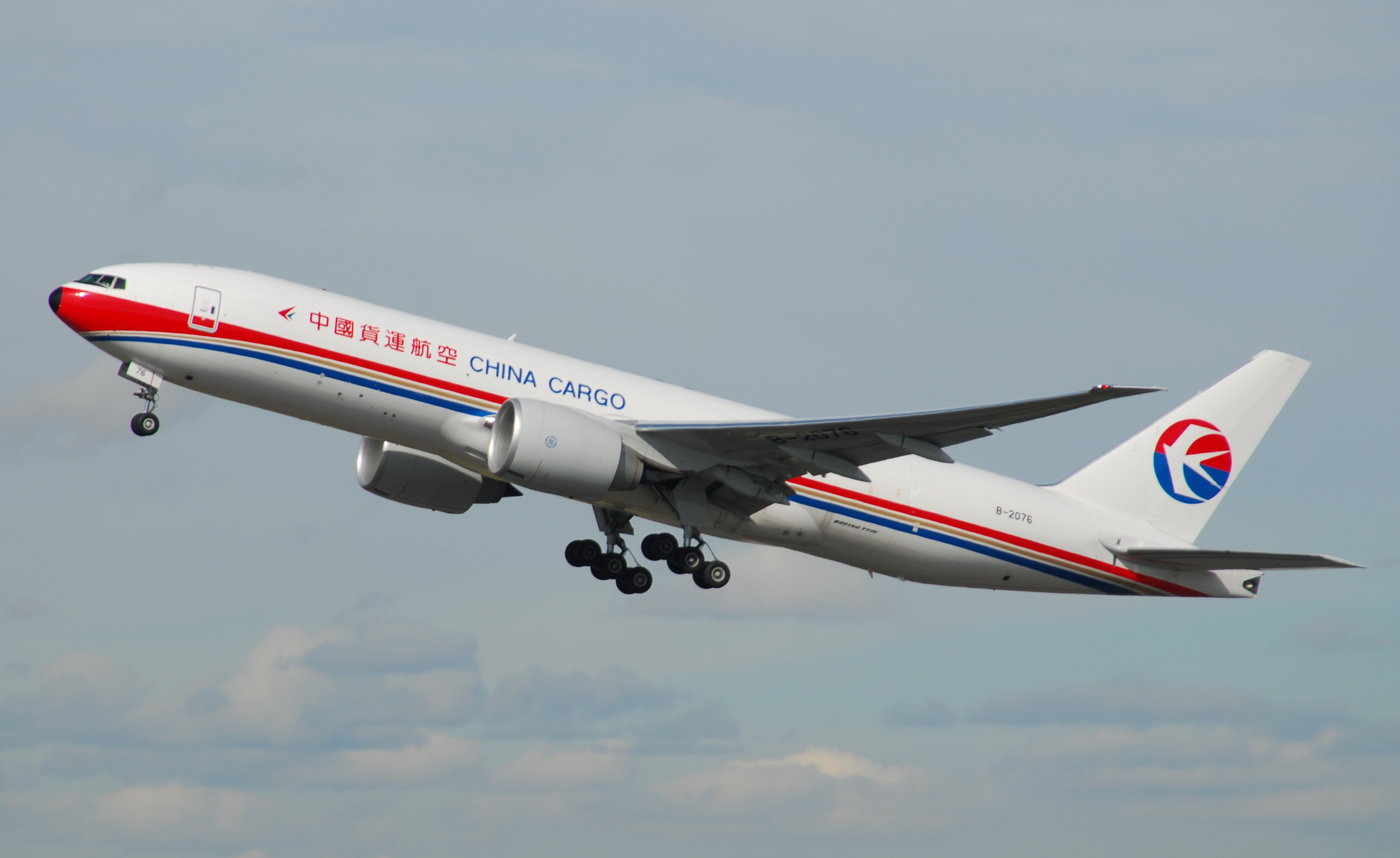
China Cargo Airlines Boeing 777F in the airline's previous livery.

As of August 2025, China Cargo Airlines operates the following aircraft:

China Cargo Airlines fleet
Aircraft	In service	Orders	Notes
Boeing 777F	15	—	
Total	15	—	

=== Former fleet ===
China Cargo Airlines fleet
Aircraft	Fleet	Year introduced	Year retired	Notes
Boeing 747-400BCF	1	2011	2014	Inherited from the merger with Great Wall Airlines.
Boeing 747-400ERF	2	2006	2023	
Boeing 747-400F	2	2011	2020	Inherited from the merger with Great Wall Airlines. 1 leased to Singapore Airlines Cargo.
Boeing 757-200PCF	2	2011	2015	Inherited from the merger with Shanghai Airlines Cargo. 1 sold to Atlas Air.
Boeing 777F	4	2010	2023	2 sold to DHL Air UK; 2 sold to Central Airlines.
McDonnell Douglas MD-11F	9	2004	2015	Inherited from the merger with Shanghai Airlines Cargo. 6 sold to Sky Lease Cargo.
Total	14			

== See also ==
- China Eastern Airlines
- Shanghai Airlines Cargo
- Great Wall Airlines
