= Ecuato Guineana =

National airline from Equatorial Guinea

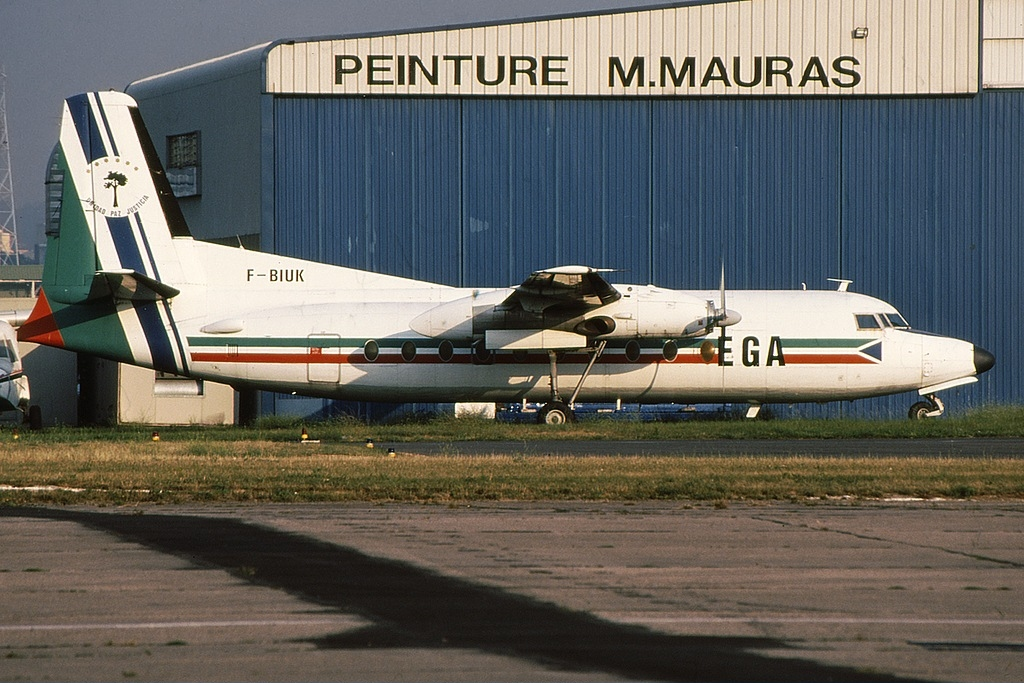
- A Fokker F-27 Friendship of EGA, pictured at Paris-Le Bourget
IATA	ICAO	Call sign
8Y	GGE	ECUATO GUINEA
- Founded: 1986
- Ceased operations: 2007
- Headquarters: Malabo, Equatorial Guinea

Ecuato Guineana de Aviación (EGA) was Equatorial Guinea's national airline, although it now appears to be defunct. Established in 1986, the carrier operated passenger and cargo services in West Africa from its main base in Malabo International Airport.

Like all other airlines having an air operator's certificate issued in Equatorial Guinea, Ecuato Guineana was banned from operating within the European Union in 2006, although it was removed from the list in 2007 because it no longer had an air operator's certificate.

== Destinations ==
Ecuato Guineana served the following destinations:

- Bata
- Douala
- Libreville
- Malabo

== Fleet ==
During the course of its history the carrier operated the following aircraft:

- Antonov An-24B
- Antonov An-24RV
- Antonov An-26
- Douglas DC-9-30
- Embraer ERJ-145
- Fokker F27-100
- Fokker F27-200
- Fokker F-28-1000
- Fokker F28 Mk4000
- HS-748 Series 2B
- Let L-410A
- Tupolev Tu-134A
- Yakovlev Yak-40

== Accidents and incidents ==
- 29 December 1999: All six occupants of an Antonov An-28, tail number 3C-JJI, lost their lives when the aircraft crashed into the Black Sea, 50 kilometres (31 mi) north of Inebolu, while en route from Kyiv to Tehran.

== See also ==
- List of defunct airlines of Equatorial Guinea

== Bibliography ==
- Guttery, Ben R. (1998). Encyclopedia of African Airlines. Jefferson, North Carolina: Mc Farland & Company, Inc. ISBN 0-7864-0495-7.
