= Great Wall Airlines =

Cargo airline of China (2006–2011)

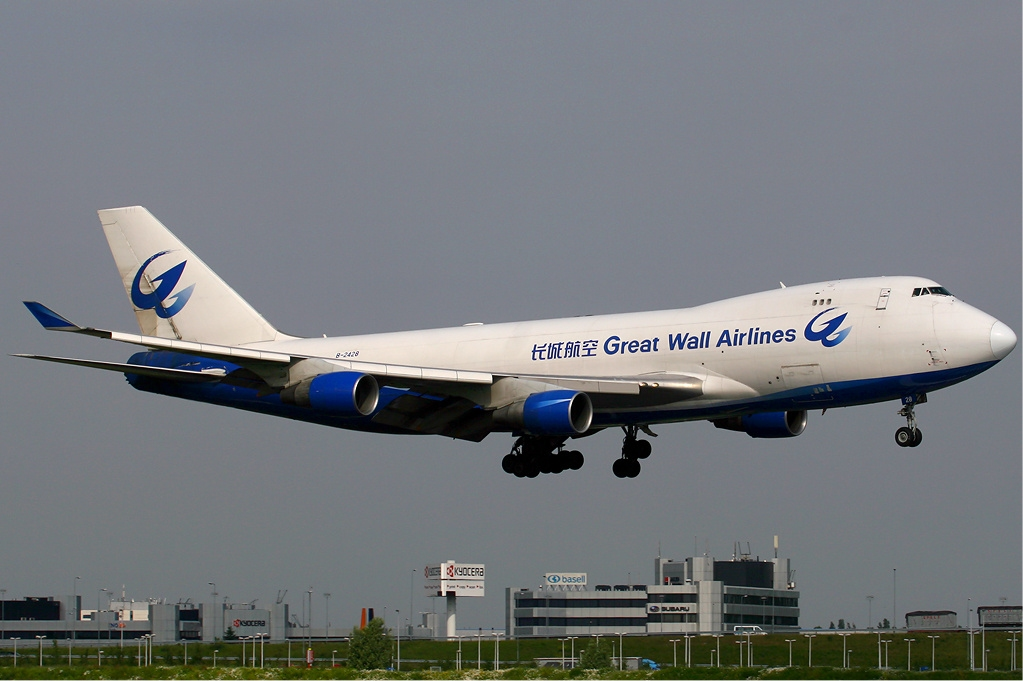
IATA	ICAO	Call sign
IJ	GWL	GREAT WALL
- Founded: 1 June 2006
- Ceased operations: 2011 (merged into China Cargo Airlines)
- Hubs: Shanghai Pudong International Airport
- Fleet size: 4
- Destinations: 12
- Parent company: China Great Wall Industry Corporation
- Headquarters: Shanghai, China
- Key people: Kuah Boon Kiam (president)

Great Wall Airlines Company Limited was a cargo airline based in Shanghai, China. It operated cargo services to Europe, the United States and Asia. Its main base was Shanghai Pudong International Airport. The airline was merged into China Cargo Airlines in 2011.

== History ==
The airline launched its first flight from Shanghai to Amsterdam on 1 June 2006 with an initial frequency of six flights per week, becoming the first local-foreign partnership airline to take flight in China.

It was co-owned by China Eastern Airlines (51%), Singapore Airlines Cargo (25%), and Dahlia Investments (24%), a subsidiary of Temasek Holdings based in Singapore.

The airline suspended operations on 18 August 2006 after its parent company, China Great Wall Industry, had sanctions imposed on it by the United States Department of the Treasury for allegedly supplying missile technology to Iran. All aircraft were returned to Singapore Airlines Cargo. On 13 December 2006, it was announced that sanctions against Great Wall Airlines had been lifted, and that the airline would resume service in February 2007. The airline resumed scheduled services to Amsterdam (six times weekly), Incheon (six times weekly) and Mumbai/Chennai (three times weekly). As of April 30, 2007, Great Wall Airlines also launched scheduled services to Manchester via Amsterdam.

The airline operated to U.S destinations including Seattle and Chicago beginning end of May 2008. It started services to Atlanta in 2009.

=== Merger ===
In the first half of 2011, the company was merged into China Cargo Airlines, together with Shanghai Airlines Cargo, which was the freight division of Shanghai Airlines.

=== Passenger airline ===
Prior to 2002, a small passenger airline operated under the name Great Wall Airlines from its base in Ningbo, Zhejiang Province. The airline was purchased by China Eastern Airlines in May 2001.

== Destinations ==
Great Wall Airlines operated flights to the following (as of January 2013):

- People's Republic of China
  - Shanghai - Shanghai Pudong International Airport - hub
  - Tianjin - Tianjin Binhai International Airport
- Netherlands
  - Amsterdam - Amsterdam Airport Schiphol
- South Korea
  - Seoul - Incheon International Airport
- United Kingdom
  - Manchester - Manchester Airport
- United States
  - Anchorage - Ted Stevens Anchorage International Airport
  - Atlanta - Hartsfield–Jackson Atlanta International Airport
  - Chicago - O'Hare International Airport

== Fleet ==
Prior to the company's closure in 2012, Great Wall Airlines operated two Boeing 747-400BCFs and two Boeing 747-400Fs.
