= Shanghai Airlines =

Airline of China

Shanghai Airlines 上海航空公司

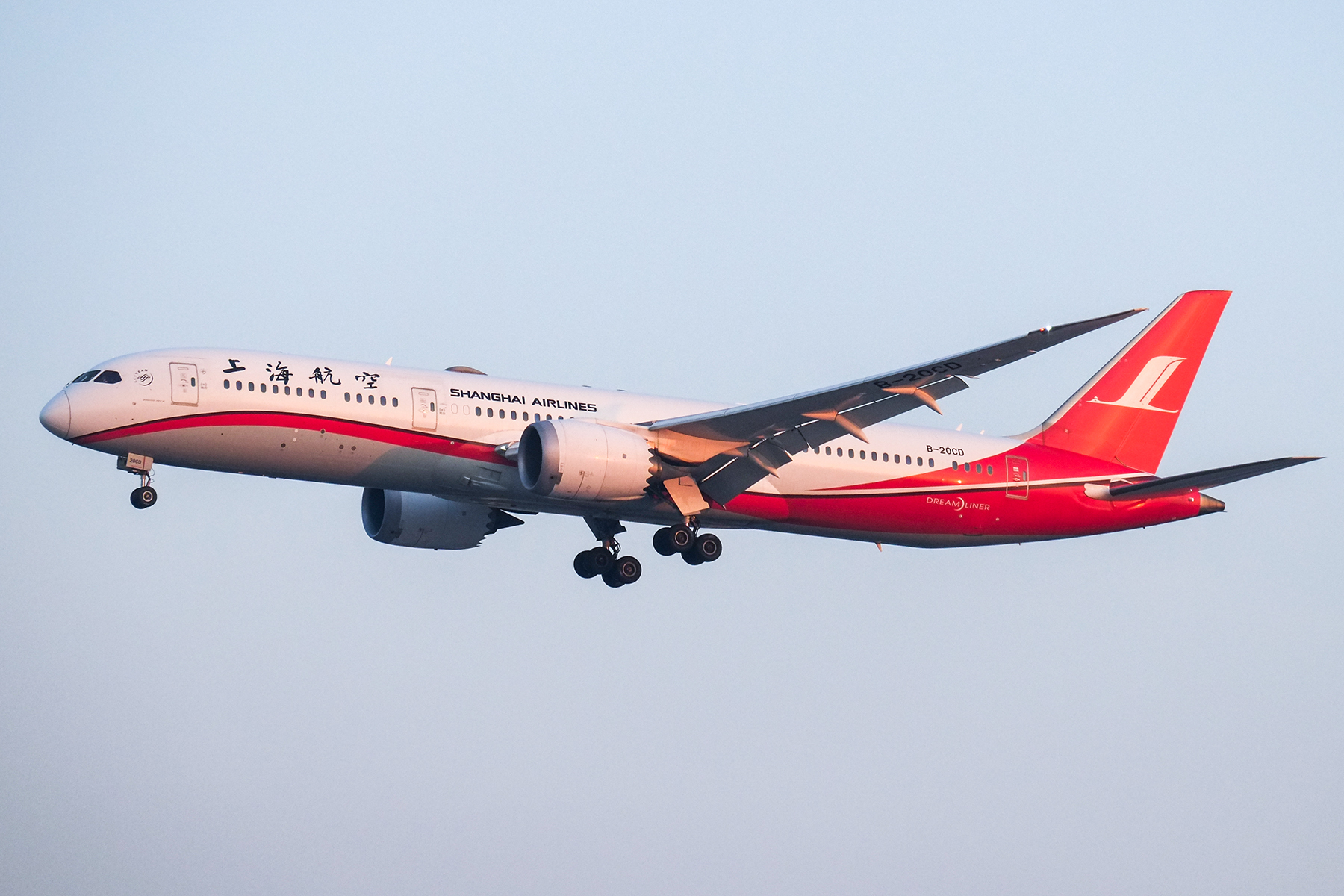
- Shanghai Airlines Boeing 787-9
IATA	ICAO	Call sign
FM	CSH	SHANGHAI AIR
- Founded: December 30, 1985; 40 years ago
- Hubs: Shanghai–Hongqiao; Shanghai–Pudong
- Frequent-flyer program: Eastern Miles
- Alliance: Star Alliance (2007–2010); SkyTeam (2011–present (affiliate))
- Fleet size: 87
- Destinations: 85
- Parent company: China Eastern Airlines
- Headquarters: Changning, Shanghai
- Key people: Zhou Chi (President); Fan Hongxi (CEO)
- Website: www.ceair.com

Shanghai Airlines
- Chinese: 上海航空公司
Transcriptions
Standard Mandarin
- Hanyu Pinyin: Shànghǎi Hángkōng Gōngsī

Shanghai Airlines is an airline headquartered in Shanghai and a wholly owned subsidiary of China Eastern Airlines. Shanghai Airlines operates domestic and international services. The logo is a white crane on a red vertical tail fin. The airline operates flights out of Shanghai Pudong International Airport and Shanghai Hongqiao International Airport both located in Shanghai. The airline is an affiliate member of the SkyTeam airline alliance with its parent company China Eastern Airlines which is a full member of the alliance.

== History ==
Shanghai Airlines was established on December 30, 1985. It is China's first commercial airline of multidimensional investment funded by the Shanghai municipal government and Shanghai local enterprises. The airline was initially restricted to domestic flights, but has operated international services since 1997.

In late 2002, Shanghai Airlines was successfully listed on the Shanghai Stock Exchange, which enabled the airline to fuel its further expansion. In 2006, the airline's cargo subsidiary was founded.

On December 12, 2007, Shanghai Airlines was officially welcomed as the 19th member of Star Alliance, which consolidated the alliance's presence in the Shanghai market.

On June 11, 2009, it was announced that Shanghai Airlines would merge with China Eastern Airlines. The merger of the two airlines was expected to reduce excess competition between the two Shanghai-based carriers, and allow them to compete more effectively with domestic rivals Air China and China Southern Airlines. It was also aimed at consolidating Shanghai's status as an international aviation hub.

In February 2010, the merger was completed. Shanghai Airlines was delisted from the Shanghai Stock Exchange and became a wholly owned subsidiary of China Eastern Airlines. The new combined airline is expected to have over half of the market share in Shanghai. Prior to the merger it was headquartered in Jing'an District.

As a result of the merger with China Eastern Airlines, Shanghai Airlines announced they would leave Star Alliance. On November 1, 2010, the airline officially left the Star Alliance and announced its intention to join its parent company in SkyTeam. Shanghai Airlines also maintained its own cargo division, Shanghai Airlines Cargo, which was merged into China Cargo Airlines. Its website was also moved to China Eastern's website following the merger.

== Destinations ==
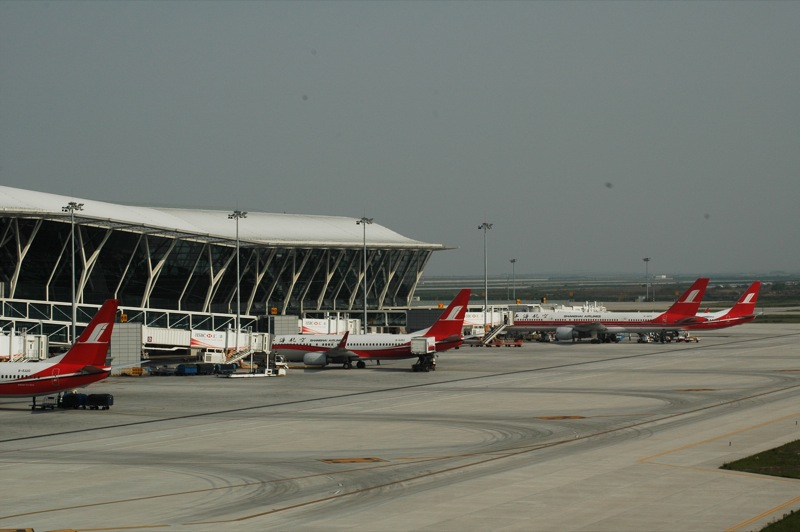
Shanghai Airlines line-up at Shanghai Pudong International Airport in 2008

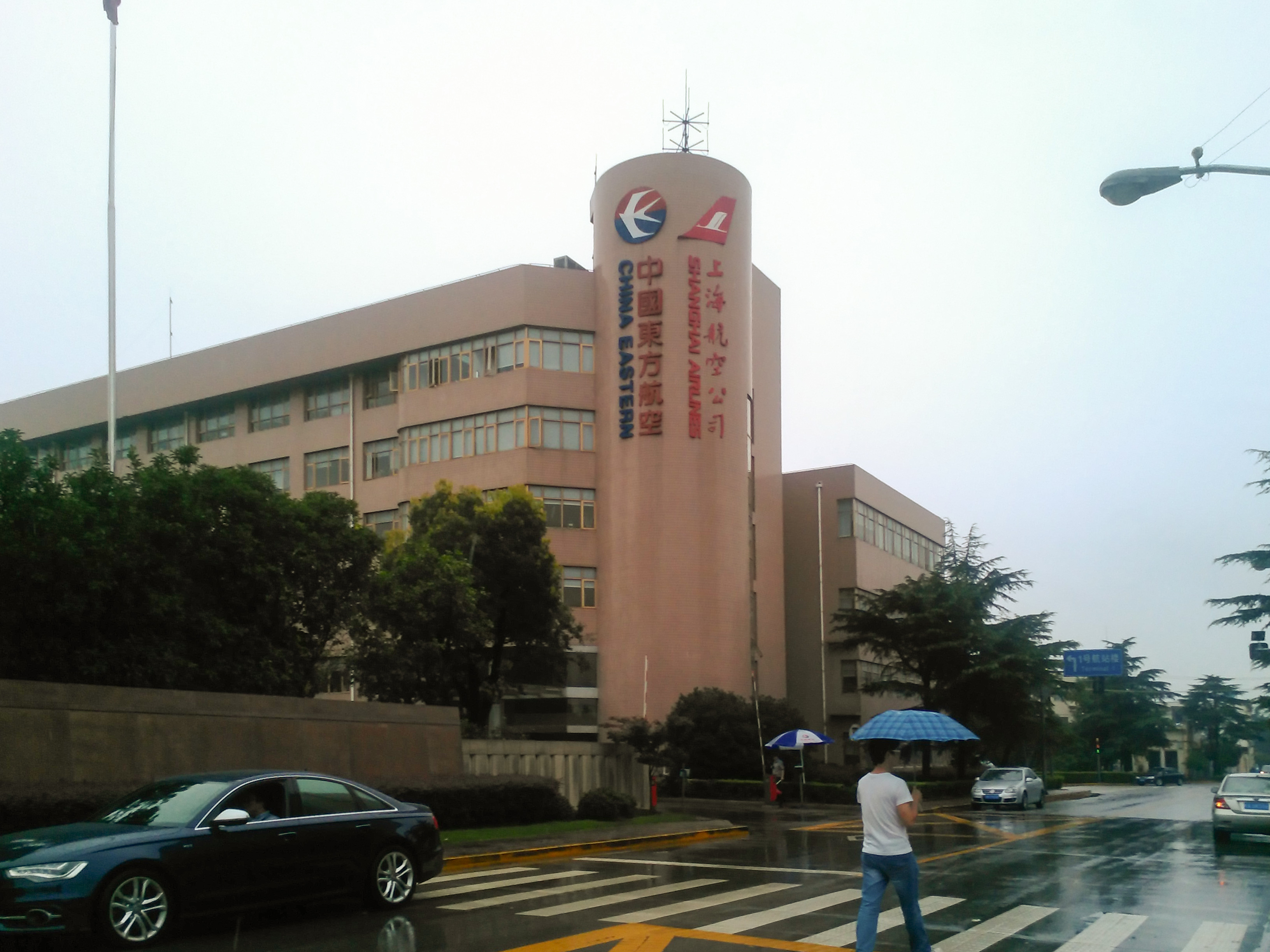
Shanghai Airlines' current headquarters at Shanghai Hongqiao Airport, shared with China Eastern Airlines

Shanghai Airlines has a substantial domestic network shared with its parent company China Eastern Airlines. The airline serves over 140 domestic and international destinations, giving access to more than 60 large and medium-sized cities in mainland China and abroad. Its international flights focus on Hong Kong, Macau, Taiwan, Japan, South Korea, Indonesia, Singapore and Thailand. Shanghai Airlines also operates services from Shanghai to Melbourne Airport, Australia and Casablanca, Morocco on behalf of China Eastern Airlines, utilising its aircraft and crew. In June 2019, Shanghai Airlines opened direct flights to Budapest Ferenc Liszt International Airport.

As of June 2026, Shanghai Airlines flies (or has flown) to the following destinations:

Country (province)	City	Airport	Notes	Refs
Cambodia	Phnom Penh	Phnom Penh International Airport	Airport closed	
China (Anhui)	Anqing	Anqing Tianzhushan Airport	Terminated	
China (Anhui)	Hefei	Hefei Luogang Airport	Airport closed	
China (Anhui)	Hefei	Hefei Xinqiao International Airport		
China (Anhui)	Huangshan	Huangshan Tunxi International Airport	Terminated	
China (Beijing)	Beijing	Beijing Capital International Airport	Terminated	
China (Beijing)	Beijing	Beijing Daxing International Airport		
China (Chongqing)	Chongqing	Chongqing Jiangbei International Airport		
China (Chongqing)	Wanzhou	Wanzhou Wuqiao Airport		
China (Fujian)	Fuzhou	Fuzhou Changle International Airport		
China (Fujian)	Quanzhou	Quanzhou Jinjiang International Airport	Terminated	
China (Fujian)	Xiamen	Xiamen Gaoqi International Airport		
China (Gansu)	Lanzhou	Lanzhou Zhongchuan International Airport		
China (Guangdong)	Guangzhou	Guangzhou Baiyun International Airport		
China (Guangdong)	Jieyang	Jieyang Chaoshan International Airport		
China (Guangdong)	Shenzhen	Shenzhen Bao'an International Airport		
China (Guangdong)	Zhanjiang	Zhanjiang Airport	Airport closed	
China (Guangdong)	Zhanjiang	Zhanjiang Wuchuan International Airport	Terminated	
China (Guangdong)	Zhuhai	Zhuhai Jinwan Airport		
China (Guangxi)	Guilin	Guilin Liangjiang International Airport		
China (Guangxi)	Nanning	Nanning Wuxu International Airport		
China (Guizhou)	Guiyang	Guiyang Longdongbao International Airport		
China (Hainan)	Haikou	Haikou Meilan International Airport		
China (Hainan)	Sanya	Sanya Phoenix International Airport		
China (Hebei)	Qinhuangdao	Qinhuangdao Beidaihe Airport		
China (Hebei)	Qiqihar	Qiqihar Sanjiazi Airport	Terminated	
China (Hebei)	Shijiazhuang	Shijiazhuang Zhengding International Airport	Terminated	
China (Heilongjiang)	Harbin	Harbin Taiping International Airport		
China (Heilongjiang)	Mudanjiang	Mudanjiang Hailang International Airport	Terminated	
China (Henan)	Zhengzhou	Zhengzhou Xinzheng International Airport		
China (Hubei)	Wuhan	Wuhan Tianhe International Airport		
China (Hubei)	Xiangyang	Xiangyang Liuji Airport	Terminated	
China (Hubei)	Yichang	Yichang Sanxia International Airport		
China (Hunan)	Changsha	Changsha Huanghua International Airport		
China (Hunan)	Zhangjiajie	Zhangjiajie Hehua International Airport		
China (Inner Mongolia)	Baotou	Baotou Donghe International Airport	Terminated	
China (Inner Mongolia)	Hohhot	Hohhot Baita International Airport		
China (Jiangsu)	Nanjing	Nanjing Lukou International Airport		
China (Jiangsu)	Xuzhou	Xuzhou Guanyin International Airport	Terminated	
China (Jiangxi)	Ji'an	Ji'an Jinggangshan Airport		
China (Jiangxi)	Jiujiang	Jiujiang Lushan Airport	Terminated	
China (Jiangxi)	Nanchang	Nanchang Changbei International Airport		
China (Jilin)	Changchun	Changchun Longjia International Airport		
China (Jilin)	Yanji	Yanji Chaoyangchuan International Airport	Terminated	
China (Liaoning)	Dalian	Dalian Zhoushuizi International Airport		
China (Liaoning)	Jinzhou	Jinzhou Jinzhouwan Airport	Terminated	
China (Liaoning)	Shenyang	Shenyang Taoxian International Airport		
China (Ningxia)	Yinchuan	Yinchuan Hedong International Airport		
China (Qinghai)	Xining	Xining Caojiapu International Airport		
China (Shaanxi)	Xi'an	Xi'an Xianyang International Airport		
China (Shandong)	Jinan	Jinan Yaoqiang International Airport	Terminated	
China (Shandong)	Jining	Jining Da'an Airport	Terminated	
China (Shandong)	Jining	Jining Qufu Airport	Airport closed	
China (Shandong)	Linyi	Linyi Qiyang International Airport		
China (Shandong)	Qingdao	Qingdao Jiaodong International Airport		
China (Shandong)	Qingdao	Qingdao Liuting International Airport	Airport closed	
China (Shandong)	Weihai	Dashuipo Airport		
China (Shandong)	Yantai	Yantai Laishan Airport	Airport closed	
China (Shandong)	Yantai	Yantai Penglai International Airport		
China (Shanghai)	Shanghai	Shanghai Hongqiao International Airport	Hub	
China (Shanghai)	Shanghai	Shanghai Pudong International Airport	Hub	
China (Shanxi)	Taiyuan	Taiyuan Wusu International Airport		
China (Shanxi)	Yuncheng	Yuncheng Yanhu International Airport		
China (Sichuan)	Chengdu	Chengdu Shuangliu International Airport	Terminated	
China (Sichuan)	Chengdu	Chengdu Tianfu International Airport		
China (Sichuan)	Mianyang	Mianyang Nanjiao Airport		
China (Tianjin)	Tianjin	Tianjin Binhai International Airport		
China (Xinjiang)	Turpan	Turpan Jiaohe Airport	Terminated	
China (Xinjiang)	Ürümqi	Ürümqi Tianshan International Airport		
China (Yunnan)	Diqing	Diqing Shangri-La Airport	Terminated	
China (Yunnan)	Jinghong	Xishuangbanna Gasa International Airport		
China (Yunnan)	Kunming	Kunming Changshui International Airport		
China (Yunnan)	Kunming	Kunming Wujiaba International Airport	Airport closed	
China (Yunnan)	Lijiang	Lijiang Sanyi International Airport	Terminated	
China (Zhejiang)	Hangzhou	Hangzhou Xiaoshan International Airport		
China (Zhejiang)	Ningbo	Ningbo Lishe International Airport		
China (Zhejiang)	Taizhou	Taizhou Luqiao Airport	Terminated	
China (Zhejiang)	Wenzhou	Wenzhou Longwan International Airport		
China (Zhejiang)	Zhoushan	Zhoushan Putuoshan International Airport		
France	Marseille	Marseille Provence Airport		
Hong Kong	Hong Kong	Hong Kong International Airport		
Hungary	Budapest	Budapest Ferenc Liszt International Airport		
Japan	Osaka	Kansai International Airport		
Japan	Tokyo	Haneda Airport		
Japan	Toyama	Toyama Airport	Terminated	
Macau	Macau	Macau International Airport		
Malaysia	Kota Kinabalu	Kota Kinabalu International Airport		
Malaysia	Kuala Lumpur	Kuala Lumpur International Airport		
Malaysia	Penang	Penang International Airport		
Maldives	Malé	Velana International Airport	Terminated	
Morocco	Casablanca	Mohammed V International Airport		
Northern Mariana Islands	Saipan	Saipan International Airport	Terminated	
Philippines	Cebu	Mactan–Cebu International Airport	Terminated	
Russia	Vladivostok	Vladivostok International Airport	Terminated	
South Korea	Busan	Gimhae International Airport		
South Korea	Seoul	Gimpo International Airport		
South Korea	Seoul	Incheon International Airport		
Taiwan	Taipei	Songshan Airport		
Thailand	Bangkok	Suvarnabhumi Airport		
Thailand	Chiang Mai	Chiang Mai International Airport	Terminated	
Thailand	Krabi	Krabi International Airport	Terminated	
Thailand	Phuket	Phuket International Airport		
Vietnam	Da Nang	Da Nang International Airport	Terminated	
Vietnam	Hanoi	Noi Bai International Airport	Terminated	
Vietnam	Ho Chi Minh City	Tan Son Nhat International Airport	Terminated	

=== Codeshare agreements ===
Shanghai Airlines has codeshare agreements with the following airlines:

- China Airlines
- China Eastern Airlines
- Delta Air Lines
- Japan Airlines
- Korean Air

=== Interline agreements ===
Shanghai Airlines has interline agreements with the following airlines:

- EVA Air
- Singapore Airlines
- Swiss International Air Lines

== Fleet ==
=== Current fleet ===
As of August 2025, Shanghai Airlines operates an all-Boeing fleet composed of the following aircraft:

Shanghai Airlines fleet
Aircraft	In service	Orders	Passengers					Notes
Aircraft	In service	Orders	F	J	W	Y	Total	Notes
Boeing 737-700	4	—	—	8	—	132	140	
Boeing 737-800	57	—	—	8	—	156	164	
Boeing 737 MAX 8	17	—	—	8	—	168	176	
Boeing 787-9	10	—	4	26	28	227	285	Order placed by China Eastern Airlines.
Comac C909	—	5	TBA	TBA	TBA	TBA	TBA	
Total	88	5						

Shanghai Airlines Boeing 737-700 in 2013

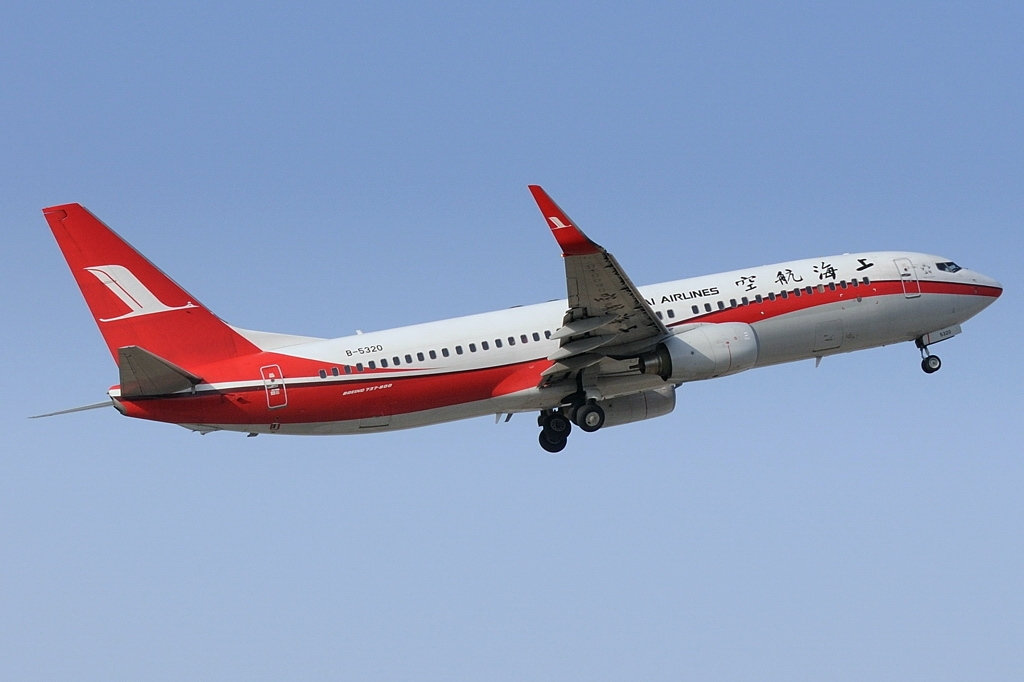
Shanghai Airlines Boeing 737-800 in 2011

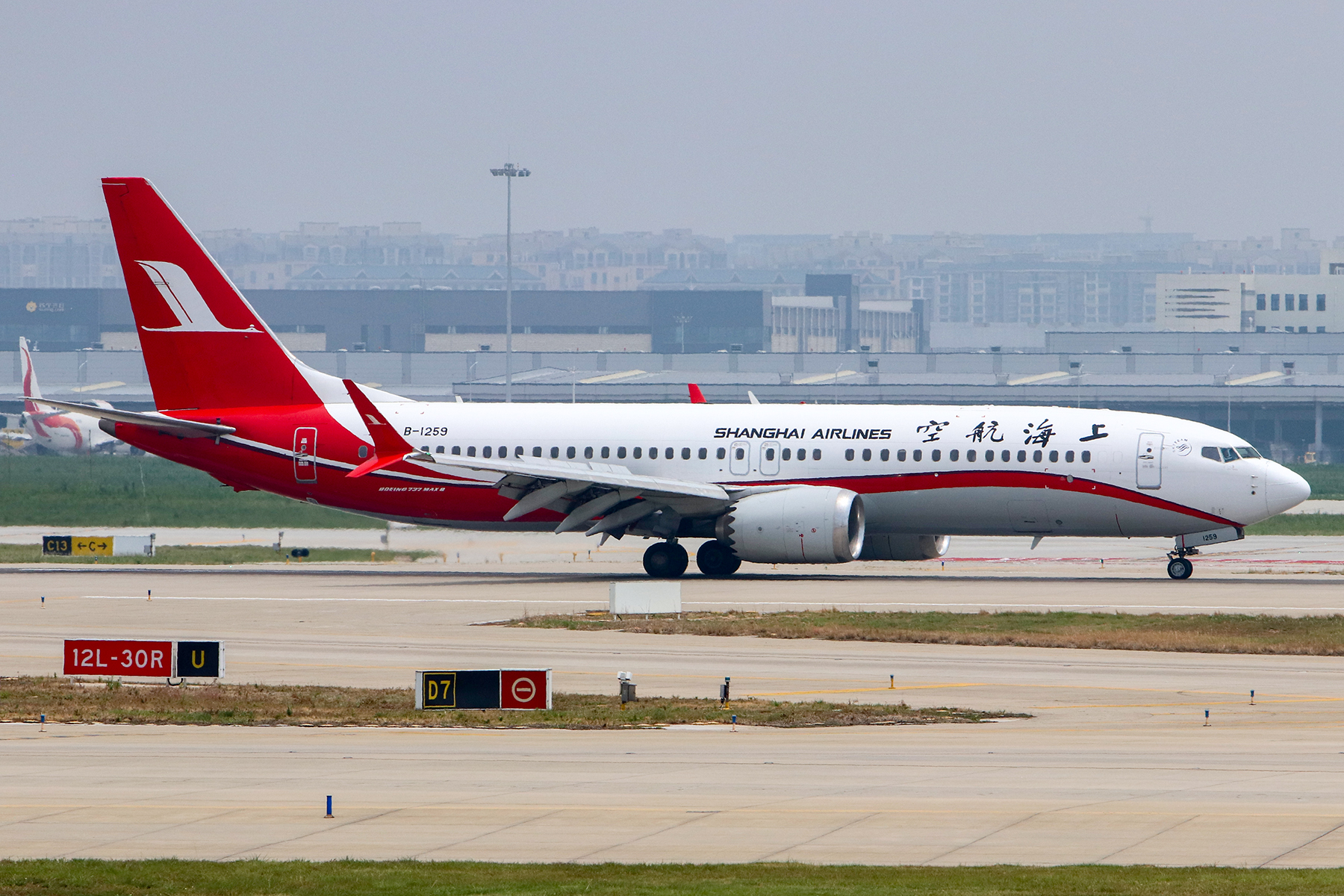
Shanghai Airlines Boeing 737 MAX 8 in 2024

Shanghai Airlines Boeing 787-9 in 2024

=== Former fleet ===
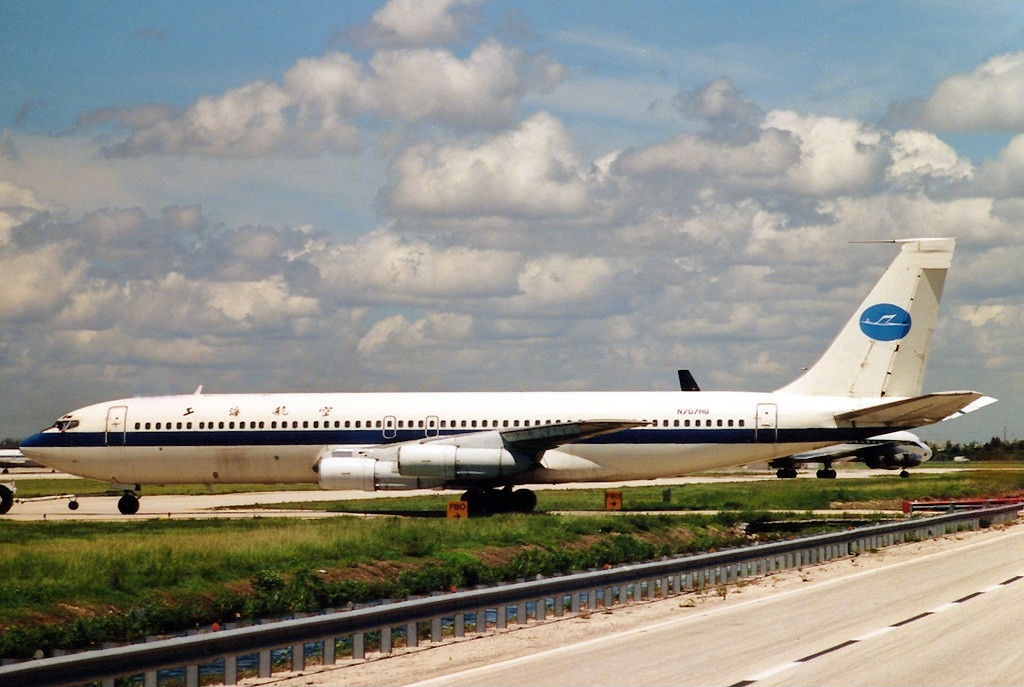
A former Shanghai Airlines Boeing 707-320C

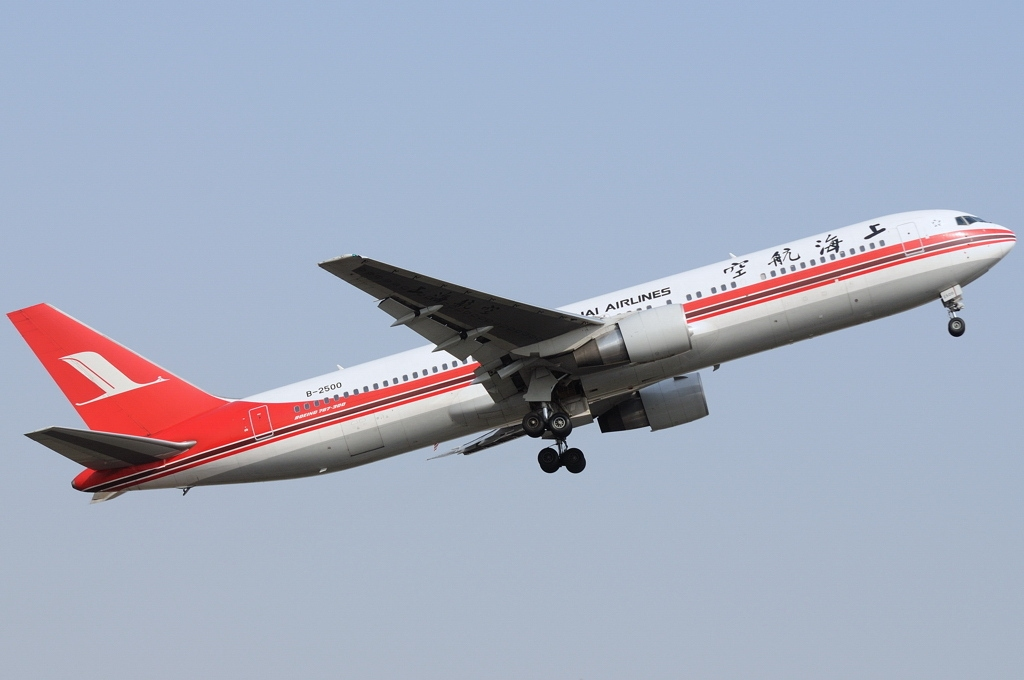
A former Shanghai Airlines Boeing 767-300ER

Shanghai Airlines has previously operated the following aircraft:

Shanghai Airlines fleet
Aircraft	Total	Introduced	Retired	Notes
Airbus A321-200	4	2009	2010	Transferred to China Eastern Airlines.
Airbus A330-200	3	2013	2019	Returned to China Eastern Airlines.
Airbus A330-300	4	2013	2023	Returned to China Eastern Airlines.
Boeing 707-320C	5	1985	1988	
Boeing 737-300	1	1997	1999	
Boeing 737-300SF	1	2004	2005	Disposed to Aerolíneas Argentinas Cargo.
Boeing 757-200	11	1990	2015	Received the last Boeing 757 ever produced.
Boeing 757-200PCF	2	2006	2011	Transferred to China Cargo Airlines.
Boeing 767-300	4	1994	2018	Last flight was on September 30, 2018.
Boeing 767-300ER	3	2003	2018	
Bombardier CRJ200ER	3	2000	2015	One aircraft is currently stored.
Bombardier CRJ200LR	2	2004	2011	
McDonnell Douglas MD-11F	4	2005	2011	Three aircraft are transferred to China Cargo Airlines.

== Frequent-flyer program ==
Crane Club (simplified Chinese: 金鹤俱乐部; traditional Chinese: 金鶴俱樂部) was the frequent-flyer program of Shanghai Airlines prior to the merger with China Eastern Airlines. However, Shanghai Airlines announced in April 2011 that the Crane Club will be merged into China Eastern's Eastern Miles Program. It was officially merged into Eastern Miles on June 8, 2011. After the merger, members can earn and use their mileage on China Eastern's flights. The Crane Club had two tiers: Crane Club Gold and Silver.

Shanghai Airlines' frequent-flyer program is called Eastern Miles (东方万里行; 東方萬里行). After the merger with China Eastern Airlines, the frequent-flyer programs were also merged. Eastern Miles became the official frequent-flyer program of Shanghai Airlines on June 8, 2011. When enough miles are collected, members can be upgraded to VIP. VIP membership of Eastern Miles can be divided into three tiers: Platinum Card Membership, Golden Card membership and Silver Card membership.
