= Central Airlines (China) =

Chinese cargo airline

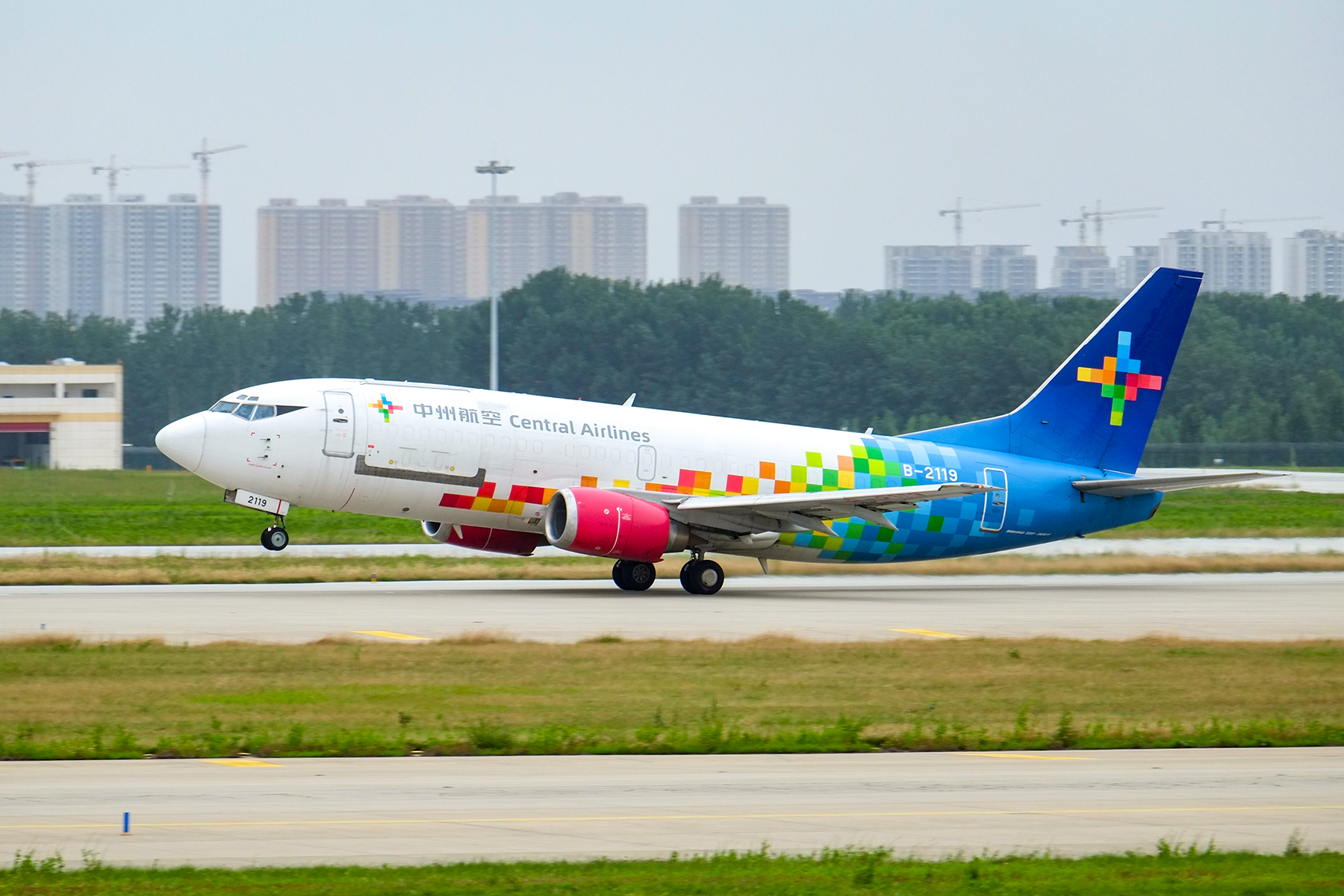
- Central Airlines Boeing 737-300SF
| IATA | ICAO | Call sign |
|---|---|---|
| I9 | HLF | HOMELAND |
- Founded: 2016; 10 years ago (as Homeland Airlines)
- Commenced operations: 2020; 6 years ago
- Operating bases: Haikou Meilan International Airport
- Hubs: Shenzhen Bao'an International Airport
- Focus cities: Tianjin, Xiamen, Paris, Dubai, Riyadh, Leipzig, and Brussels
- Fleet size: 10
- Destinations: 50+
- Employees: 770
- Website: www.zzairlines.com/cn/

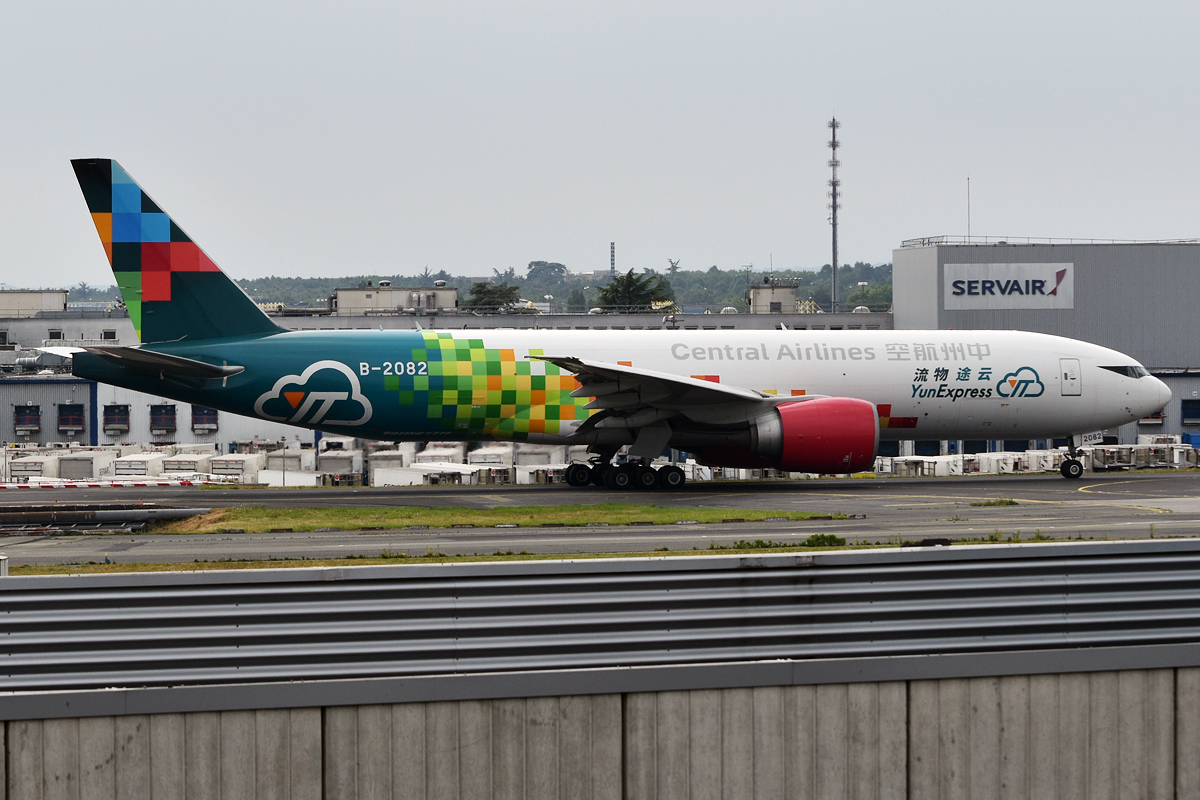
A Central Airlines Boeing 777F

China Central Airlines, also known as Zhongzhou Airlines (Chinese: 中州航空), is a Chinese cargo airline based at Haikou Meilan International Airport.

== History ==
Central Airlines was originally founded as Homeland Airlines. It was established in 2016. It received its Air Operator's Certificate in April 2020 and started operations the next month. It operates both domestic and international flights with a fleet of three Boeing 737 freighters. One of Central's Boeing 777F aircraft was operated to Paris CDG in August 2024.

Central Airlines was first approved to operate Zhengzhou-Wuxi-Quanzhou/Shenzhen/Haikou flights in 2020. It has expressed interest in operating to Hong Kong, Macau, and Taiwan as well.

== Fleet ==
As of January 2026, Central Airlines operates the following aircraft:

Central Airlines fleet
| Aircraft | In service | Orders | Notes |
|---|---|---|---|
| Boeing 737-800BCF | 4 | — | |
| Boeing 777F | 6 | — | Two are operated for DHL. |
| Total | 10 | — | |

At the end of 2025, two Boeing 737-300SF were phased out.
