= Guizhou Airlines =

Airline of China

IATA	ICAO	Call sign
G4	CGH	GUIZHOU
- Founded: 1991
- Ceased operations: 1998 (merged with China Southern Airlines)
- Hubs: Guiyang Longdongbao Airport
- Fleet size: 20
- Parent company: China Southern Airlines
- Headquarters: Guiyang, Guizhou, China

Guizhou Airlines (Chinese: 貴州航空; pinyin: Guìzhōu Hángkōng) was an airline based in Guiyang, Guizhou, China. It was a small provincial subsidiary of China Southern Airlines operated scheduled domestic passenger and cargo services in southern China. Its main base was Guiyang Longdongbao Airport, Guizhou. In 1998, it merged into China Southern Airlines.

== History ==
The airline was established in 1991. It was owned by China Southern Airlines (60%) and Guizhou Xianfei Industrial (40%).

== Fleet ==
The Guizhou Airlines fleet consists of the following aircraft (as of August 2019):

Guizhou Airlines Fleet
Aircraft	In service	Notes
Boeing 737-800	20	

Guizhou Airlines previously operated the following aircraft:

- 1 Boeing 737-300 from July 1998 to March 2004, when it was returned to China Southern Airlines.
- 1 further Boeing 737-700
- 2 Xian Y-7-100
- 5 further Boeing 737-800
