= Air Guinea =

Equatorial Guinea short-lived airline

IATA	ICAO	Call sign
LQ	—	—
- Founded: 2004
- Ceased operations: 2005
- Hubs: Malabo International Airport
- Headquarters: Malabo, Equatorial Guinea

Air Guinea was a short-lived airline based in Malabo, Equatorial Guinea. Its main base was Malabo International Airport. The airline operated scheduled and chartered passenger flights and also featured a cargo department (Air Guinea Cargo). The airline was on the List of air carriers banned in the European Union.

== Fleet ==
The Air Guinea fleet included the following aircraft (as at February 2008):

- 1 Boeing 727
- 1 Boeing 737-200
