= Punto Azul =

Equatoguinean airline

IATA	ICAO	Call sign
ZR	PUN	PUNTO AZUL
- Founded: 2013
- Ceased operations: 2017
- Hubs: Malabo International Airport
- Focus cities: Bata, Mongomeyen, Douala, Accra
- Frequent-flyer program: Club Azul
- Alliance: Cronos
- Fleet size: 1
- Destinations: 4
- Headquarters: Malabo, Equatorial Guinea

Punto Azul is a regional airline based in Malabo, Equatorial Guinea. Its main HUB base is Malabo International Airport. The airline operates scheduled flights mainly from the capital of Malabo, private charters for oil and gas industry of Equatorial Guinea, and cargo.

== Destinations ==
As of January 2016, Punto Azul operates following destinations:

- Malabo, Equatorial Guinea – Hub
- Bata, Equatorial Guinea
- Yaoundé, Cameroon
- Douala, Cameroon
- Accra, Ghana
- São Tomé, São Tomé and Príncipe

== Fleet ==
=== Current fleet ===
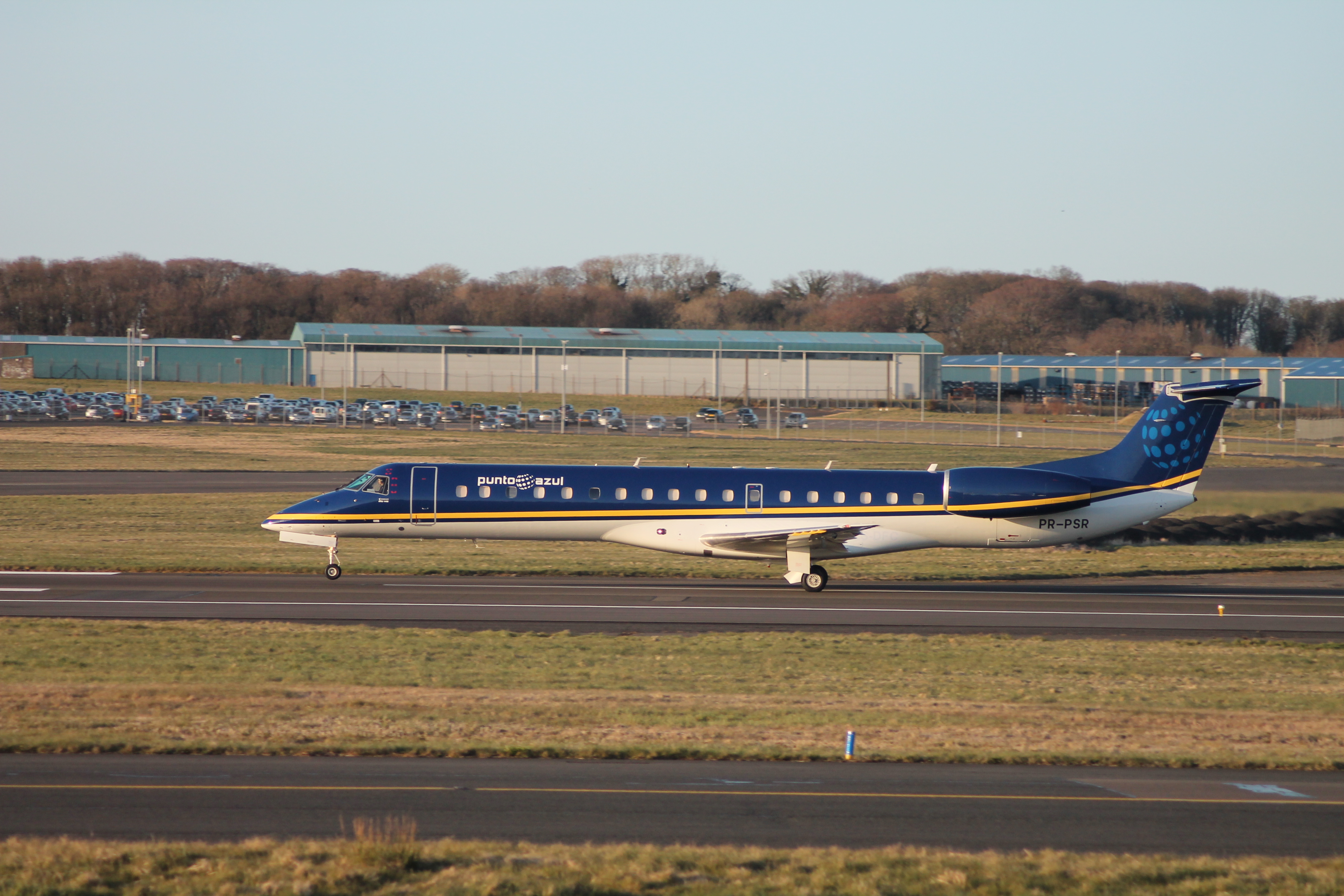
Punto Azul Embraer ERJ 145 MP

As of March 2020, Punto Azul operates the following aircraft:

Punto Azul
Aircraft	In Service	Passengers		
Aircraft	In Service	C	Y	Total
Embraer ERJ 145 MP	1			50
Total	1			

=== Former fleet ===
The airline previously operated the following aircraft as of June 2016:

- 2 further Embraer ERJ 145

== Club Azul ==
Punto Azul was the first airline from Equatorial Guinea to establish a frequent flyer program.
