= Equatair =

Airline in Equatorial Guinea

| IATA | ICAO | Call sign |
|---|---|---|
| — | EQR | Aero Equatair |
- Founded: December 2004
- Ceased operations: 31 August 2005
- Headquarters: Equatorial Guinea

Equatair (Equatorial Express Airlines) was an airline in Equatorial Guinea.

The airline was on the list of air carriers banned in the European Union.

== History ==
Equatair was established in December 2004. Its predecessor, Aerolíneas de Guinea Ecuatorial, was closed by order of the government, and its Antonov aircraft were used to create Equatair. The aircraft were subsequently involved in a fatal accident, thus leaving the airline without any aircraft. In 2006, Equatair was disestablished.

== Accidents and incidents ==
- On 16 July 2005, an Antonov 24 crashed into a mountainous area near Baney, killing all 60 passengers and crew on board.
