= Guinea Ecuatorial Airlines =

Equatoguinean airline

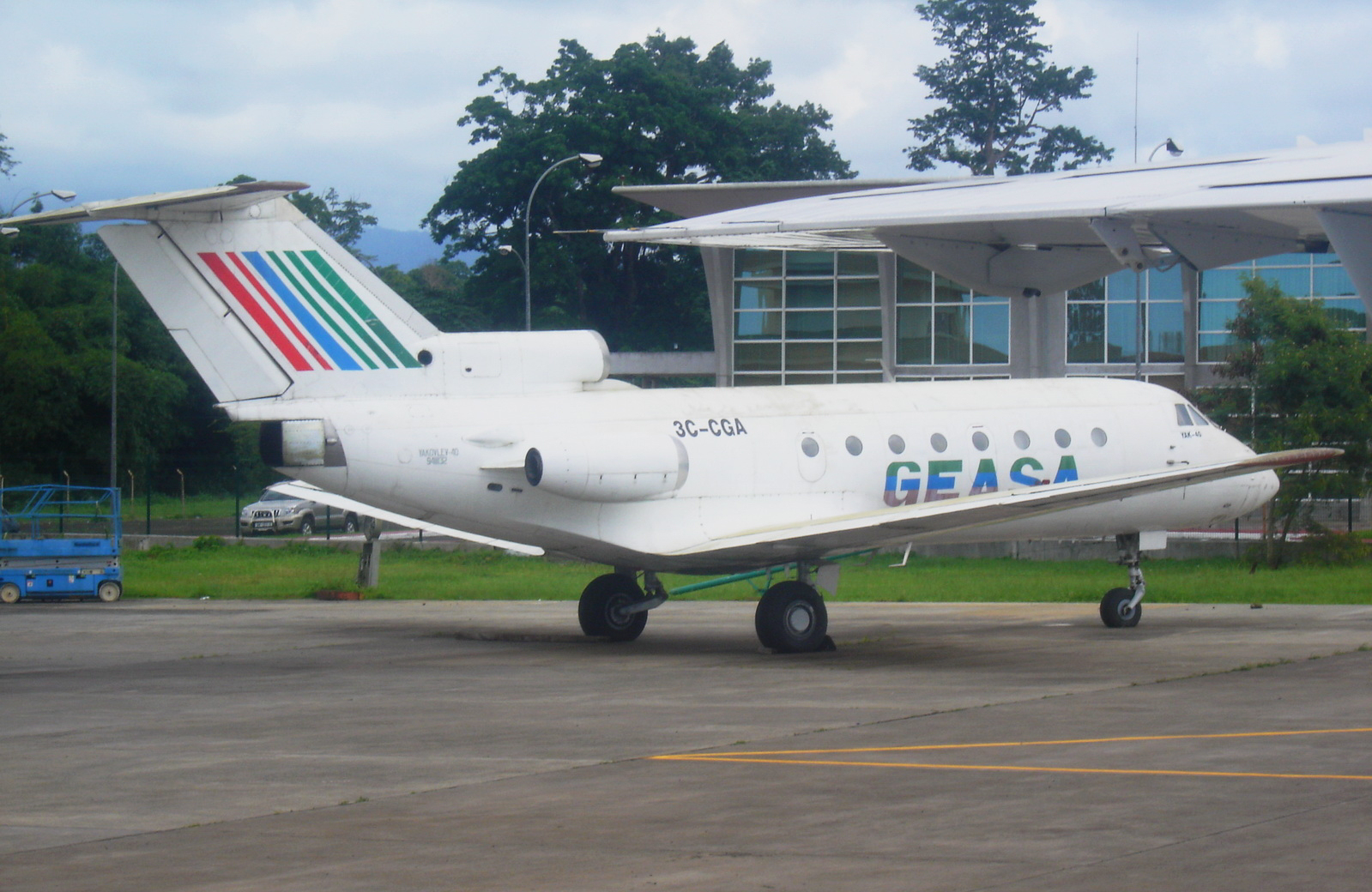
- A GEASA Yakovlev Yak-40 at Malabo International Airport in 2007
IATA	ICAO	Call sign
-	GEA	GEASA
- Founded: 1996
- Hubs: Malabo International Airport
- Fleet size: 5
- Headquarters: Malabo, Equatorial Guinea

Guinea Equatorial Airlines (GEASA) is an airline based in Malabo, Equatorial Guinea. It was established and started operations in 1996 and operates domestic charter services. Its main base is Malabo International Airport.

The airline is on the list of air carriers banned in the European Union.

== Fleet ==
As of 2026 one Yakolev yak 40 is in the fleet

=== Historic ===
The Guinea Ecuatorial Airlines fleet includes the following aircraft (at February 2015):

- 3 Yakovlev Yak-40
- 1 Antonov An-72
- 1 Boeing 767-300ER (operated for CEIBA Intercontinental) (as of August 2016)
