= List of airlines of Equatorial Guinea =

This article is a list of airlines currently operating in Equatorial Guinea. All airlines are currently banned from flying into EU.

== List ==
Operational air carriers of Equatorial Guinea
Airline	IATA	ICAO	Callsign	Image	Founded	Commenced operations	Notes
CEIBA Intercontinental	C2	CEL	CEIBA LINE		2007	2007	
Cronos Airlines	C8				2007		

== See also ==
- List of airlines
- List of air carriers banned in the European Union
- List of defunct airlines of Equatorial Guinea
